= 1973–74 Brighton & Hove Albion F.C. season =

Brighton and Hove Albion F.C.
1973–74 season
- Chairman: Mike Bamber
- Manager: Pat Saward (until 20 October 1973); Glen Wilson (until 27 October 1973); Brian Clough
- Stadium: Goldstone Ground
- Division Three: 19th
- FA Cup: Fourth round
- League Cup: Second round
- Top goalscorer: League: Beamish (12); All: Beamish (12)
Home colours	Away colours

During the 1973–74 English football season, Brighton and Hove Albion competed in the Division Three, the FA Cup and the League Cup.

== Season summary ==
In his second season as chairman Mike Bamber clinched the arrival of manager Brian Clough and his assistant Peter Taylor to the team on 1 November. The move of the 1972 First Division Champion duo shocked the English media and put the Division Three club on the Football map. According to several players, Clough was not very interested in managing the squad and he was rarely seen through weekdays at the facilities.

Meanwhile, the team finished on 19th spot avoiding relegation, being early eliminated in League Cup by Charlton Athletic and lost the FA Cup first series against a non-League club.

== Squad ==
Note: Flags indicate national team as defined under FIFA eligibility rules; some limited exceptions apply. Players may hold more than one non-FIFA nationality.

Pos.	Nation	Player
GK	ENG	Peter Downsborough
GK	ENG	Peter Grummitt
GK	ENG	Brian Powney
DF	WAL	Mick Brown
DF	ENG	Paul Fuschillo
DF	ENG	Norman Gall
DF	ENG	Ken Goodeve
DF	ENG	Ian Goodwin
DF	ENG	Graham Howell
DF	ENG	George Ley
DF	ENG	Steve Piper
DF	ENG	Harry Wilson
MF	SCO	Johnny Boyle
MF	ENG	Brian Bromley

Pos.	Nation	Player
MF	ENG	Mick Conway
MF	ENG	Pat Hilton
MF	ENG	Ronnie Howell
MF	SCO	Billy McEwan
MF	ENG	Bert Murray
MF	WAL	Peter O'Sullivan
MF	ENG	Lammie Robertson
MF	ENG	Eddie Spearritt
MF	ENG	John Templeman
MF	ENG	Tony Towner
MF	ENG	Ronnie Welch
FW	ENG	Kenny Beamish
FW	ENG	Barry Bridges
FW	ENG	Dave Busby

== Results ==
=== Division Three ===
==== League table ====
Pos	Team	Pld	W	D	L	GF	GA	GAv	Pts	Promotion or relegation
17	Plymouth Argyle	46	17	10	19	59	54	1.093	44	
18	Hereford United	46	14	15	17	53	57	0.930	43	
19	Brighton & Hove Albion	46	16	11	19	52	58	0.897	43	
20	Port Vale	46	14	14	18	52	58	0.897	42	
21	Cambridge United (R)	46	13	9	24	48	81	0.593	35	Relegation to the Fourth Division

Source: rsssf.com
(R) Relegated

==== Results by round ====
Round	1	2	3	4	5	6	7	8	9	10	11	12	13	14	15	16	17	18	19	20	21	22	23	24	25	26	27	28	29	30	31	32	33	34	35	36	37	38	39	40	41	42	43	44	45	46
Ground	A	H	A	A	H	H	A	H	A	A	H	H	H	A	H	A	A	H	H	A	A	H	H	A	A	H	A	A	H	A	H	H	A	H	A	H	H	A	A	H	H	A	A	H	H	A
Result	D	L	W	D	L	L	D	L	W	L	L	W	W	L	D	D	W	D	L	L	L	L	W	D	W	W	D	L	D	D	W	W	W	W	L	W	L	L	L	W	W	W	L	L	L	D
Position	8	17	14	10	18	21	20	22	18	19	21	19	18	19	19	19	17	18	18	18	20	20	20	20	20	17	18	18	18	18	18	15	15	10	12	9	13	15	17	14	12	10	12	13	16	18

Source: https://www.11v11.com/teams/brighton-and-hove-albion/tab/matches/season/1974/
A = Away; H = Home; W = Win; D = Draw; L = Loss; = Leader, Promoted to 1974–75 Second Division; = Promoted to 1974–75 Second Division; = Relegation to 1974–75 Division Four

==== Matches ====
- Source:https://www.11v11.com/teams/brighton-and-hove-albion/tab/matches/season/1974/

25 August 1973 1	Rochdale	1–1	Brighton & Hove Albion	Rochdale
	Darling 54'	Report	40' Bridges	Stadium: Spotland Stadium; Attendance: 2665

1 September 1973 2	Brighton and Hove Albion	0–2	AFC Bournemouth	Brighton and Hove
				Stadium: Goldstone Ground

8 September 1973 3	Plymouth Argyle	1–0	Brighton & Hove Albion	Plymouth
				Stadium: Home Park

10 September 1973 4	Southport	1–1	Brighton & Hove Albion	Southport
				Stadium: Haig Avenue

15 September 1973 5	Brighton & Hove Albion	1–2	Charlton Athletic	Brighton and Hove
				Stadium: Goldstone Ground

19 September 1973 6	Brighton & Hove Albion	1–2	Oldham Athletic	Brighton and Hove
				Stadium: Goldstone Ground

22 September 1973 7	Grimsby Town	0–0	Brighton & Hove Albion	Cleethorpes
				Stadium: Blundell Park

29 September 1973 8	Brighton & Hove Albion	0–1	Watford F.C.	Brighton and Hove
				Stadium: Goldstone Ground

2 October 1973 9	Oldham Athletic	1–0	Brighton & Hove Albion	Oldham
				Stadium: Boundary Park

6 October 1973 10	Blackburn Rovers	1–3	Brighton and Hove Albion	Blackburn
				Stadium: Ewood Park

13 October 1973 11	Brighton and Hove Albion	0–1	Halifax Town	Brighton and Hove
				Stadium: Goldstone Ground

20 October 1973 12	Brighton & Hove Albion	2–0	Shrewsbury Town	Brighton and Hove
				Stadium: Goldstone Ground

24 October 1973 13	Brighton & Hove Albion	4–0	Southport F.C.	Brighton and Hove
				Stadium: Goldstone Ground

27 October 1973 14	Hereford United	0–3	Brighton & Hove Albion	Hereford
				Stadium: Edgar Street

3 November 1973 15	Brighton and Hove Albion	0–0	York City	Brighton and Hove
				Stadium: Goldstone Ground; Attendance: 16,029

10 November 1973 16	Huddersfield Town	2–2	Brighton & Hove Albion	Huddersfield
	Terry Dolan 37'; Phil Summerill 54'		62' Ken Beamish; 78' Barry Bridges	Stadium: Leeds Road; Attendance: 6,057

13 November 1973 17	Walsall	0–1	Brighton & Hove Albion	Walsall
			Pat Hilton	Stadium: Fellows Park; Attendance: 5,116

17 November 1973 18	Brighton & Hove Albion	0–0	Chesterfield F.C.	Brighton and Hove
				Stadium: Goldstone Ground; Attendance: 14,186; Referee: GC Kew

1 December 1973 19	Brighton & Hove Albion	2–8	Bristol Rovers	Brighton and Hove
	Ronnie Howell; Peter O'Sullivan		,,, Alan Warboys, Bruce Bannister; Gordon Fearnley	Stadium: Goldstone Ground; Attendance: 10,776

8 December 1973 20	Tranmere Rovers	1–4	Brighton & Hove Albion	Birkenhead
	Tommy Young 8'; Bobby Tynan 16'; Ronnie Moore 56'; Paul Crossley 65'		61' Lammie Robertson	Stadium: Prenton Park; Attendance: 4,458

22 December 1973 21	Watford	0–1	Brighton & Hove Albion	Watford
	Billy Jennings			Stadium: Vicarage Road; Attendance: 5,909

26 December 1973 22	Brighton & Hove Albion	0–1	Aldershot F.C.	Brighton and Hove
			28' Roger Joslyn	Stadium: Goldstone Ground; Attendance: 14,831

29 December 1973 23	Brighton & Hove Albion	1–0	Plymouth Argyle	Brighton and Hove
	Ken Beamish			Stadium: Goldstone Ground; Attendance: 11,197

1 January 1974 24	Bournemouth	0–0	Brighton & Hove Albion	Bournemouth
				Stadium: Dean Court; Attendance: 17,079

12 January 1974 25	Charlton Athletic	0–4	Brighton & Hove Albion	London
			48' (pen.) 57' 64'Ronnie Howell; 71' Peter O'Sullivan	Stadium: The Valley; Attendance: 7,646

20 January 1974 26	Brighton and Hove Albion	2–1	Rochdale F.C.	Brighton and Hove
	Ken Beamish; Tony Towner		Leo Skeete	Stadium: Goldstone Ground; Attendance: 18,900

27 January 1974 27	Cambridge United	1–1	Brighton & Hove Albion	Cambridge
	Dave Simmons 78'		90' Mick Brown	Stadium: Abbey Stadium; Attendance: 7,749

2 February 1974 28	Port Vale	2–1	Brighton & Hove Albion	Stoke-on-Trent
	Brian Horton 5'; Ray Williams 34'		53'Ken Beamish	Stadium: Vale Park; Attendance: 3,728

9 February 1974 29	Brighton & Hove Albion	1–1	Grimsby Town F.C.	Brighton and Hove
	Barry Bridges 60'		10' Jack Lewis	Stadium: Goldstone Ground; Attendance: 10,498

16 February 1974 30	Halifax Town	2–2	Brighton & Hove Albion	Halifax
	Terry Shanahan 18', 42'; John Templeman 68'		65' (pen.) Lammie Robertson	Stadium: The Shay; Attendance: 2,767; Referee: JB Goggins

23 February 1974 31	Brighton & Hove Albion	3–0	Blackburn Rovers	Brighton and Hove
	Ronnie Welch 25' (pen.); Barry Bridges 55', 77'			Stadium: Goldstone Ground; Attendance: 12,102

27 February 1974 32	Brighton & Hove Albion	2–1	Wrexham F.C.	Brighton and Hove
	Ronnie Howell 24' (pen.); Peter O'Sullivan 38'		16' Geoff P Davies	Stadium: Goldstone Ground; Attendance: 7,524

3 March 1974 33	Aldershot	0–1	Brighton & Hove Albion	Aldershot
			Ken Beamish	Stadium: Recreation Ground; Attendance: 9,828

10 March 1974 34	Brighton & Hove Albion	2–1	Hereford United	Brighton and Hove
	Ken Beamish 64'; Steve Piper 88'		6' Dudley Tyler	Stadium: Goldstone Ground; Attendance: 17,266

16 March 1974 35	Shrewsbury Town	1–0	Brighton & Hove Albion	Shrewsbury
	Laurie Calloway 25'			Stadium: Gay Meadow; Attendance: 2,077

20 March 1974 36	Brighton & Hove Albion	2–1	Port Vale F.C.	Brighton and Hove
	Barry Bridges; Billy McEwan		Dave Harris	Stadium: Goldstone Ground; Attendance: 9,365

23 March 1974 37	Brighton and Hove Albion	1–2	Huddersfield Town	Brighton and Hove
	Billy McEwan 27'		22', 51' Alan Gowling	Stadium: Goldstone Ground; Attendance: 12,444

25 March 1974 38	Wrexham	1–0	Brighton & Hove Albion	Wrexham
	David Smallman 11'			Stadium: Racecourse Ground; Attendance: 5,925

30 March 1974 39	York City	0–3	Brighton & Hove Albion	York
	Phil Burrows 31'; Chris Jones 36', 71'			Stadium: Bootham Crescent; Attendance: 7,493

3 April 1974 40	Brighton & Hove Albion	4–1	Cambridge United	Brighton and Hove
	Barry Bridges 35'; Ronnie Welch 45'; Ronnie Howell 65' (pen.); Billy McEwan 65'		43' (pen.) Bobby Ross	Stadium: Goldstone Ground; Attendance: 9,833

6 April 1974 41	Brighton & Hove Albion	2–1	Walsall F.C.	Brighton and Hove
	Barry Bridges 10'; Lammie Robertson 61'		11' Alan Buckley	Stadium: Goldstone Ground; Attendance: 10,588

12 April 1974 42	Southend United	0–2	Brighton & Hove Albion	Southend-on-Sea
			70', 74' Ken Beamish	Stadium: Roots Hall; Attendance: 10,086

13 April 1974 43	Chesterfield	1–0	Brighton & Hove Albion	Chesterfield
	Andy Kowalski 13'			Stadium: Saltergate Recreation Ground; Attendance: 6,971; Referee: A Porter

15 April 1974 44	Brighton & Hove Albion	0–2	Southend United	Brighton and Hove
			8' Peter Silvester; 26' Chris Guthrie	Stadium: Goldstone Ground; Attendance: 12,975; Referee: DRG Nippard

20 April 1974 45	Brighton & Hove Albion	1–3	Tranmere Rovers	Brighton and Hove
	Ronnie Howell 17' (pen.); Bobby Tynan 43'; Tommy Veitch 89'		15' Paul Crossley	Stadium: Goldstone Ground; Attendance: 9,609

27 April 1974 46	Bristol Rovers	1–1	Brighton & Hove Albion	Bristol
	Bruce Bannister 85' (pen.)		19' Lammie Robertson	Stadium: Eastville Stadium; Attendance: 19,205

=== FA Cup ===
==== First round ====
24 November 1973 FA Cup (R1)	Walton & Hersham	0–0	Brighton and Hove Albion
Note: Walton & Hersham (Non League)

28 November 1973 Replay	Brighton and Hove Albion	0–4	Walton & Hersham	Brighton and Hove
			25' Russell Perkins; 82', 84', 90' Clive Foskett	Stadium: Goldstone Ground; Attendance: 9,657

=== League Cup ===
29 August 1973 League Cup Round 1	Brighton and Hove Albion	1–2	Charlton Athletic	Brighton and Hove
				Stadium: Goldstone Ground

== Statistics ==
=== Players statistics ===
No.	Pos	Nat	Player	Total		Division Three		FA Cup		League Cup	
No.	Pos	Nat	Player	Apps	Goals	Apps	Goals	Apps	Goals	Apps	Goals
	GK	(England) ENG	Powney	30	0	27	0	2	0	1	0
	DF	(England) ENG	Fuschillo	40	0	37	0	2	0	1	0
	DF	(England) ENG	Gall	40	0	37	0	2	0	1	0
	DF	(England) ENG	Piper	36	1	34	1	2	0	0	0
	DF	(England) ENG	Wilson	25	0	25	0	0	0	0	0
	MF	(Wales) WAL	O'Sullivan	49	4	46	4	2	0	1	0
	MF	(England) ENG	Howell	30	9	26+1	9	2	0	1	0
	MF	(Scotland) SCO	Robertson	33	5	27+3	5	2	0	0+1	0
	MF	(England) ENG	Templeman	37	2	34	1	2	0	1	1
	FW	(England) ENG	Beamish	45	12	43+1	12	0	0	1	0
	FW	(England) ENG	Bridges	36	10	31+2	10	2	0	1	0
	GK	(England) ENG	Grummitt	16	0	16	0	0	0	0	0
	MF	(England) ENG	Spearritt	26	1	21+2	1	2	0	1	0
	MF	(England) ENG	Welch	21	2	21	2	0	0	0	0
	MF	(England) ENG	Towner	24	2	20+3	2	0+1	0	0	0
	DF	(England) ENG	Ley	19	0	16	0	2	0	1	0
	MF	(England) ENG	Hilton	19	1	15+2	1	2	0	0	0
	MF	(Scotland) SCO	McEwan	15	3	15	3	0	0	0	0
	MF	(Scotland) SCO	Boyle	10	0	10	0	0	0	0	0
	DF	(England) ENG	Howell	10	0	8+1	0	0	0	1	0
	DF	(England) ENG	Goodwin	8	0	6+2	0	0	0	0	0
	DF	(Wales) WAL	Brown	8	1	5+3	1	0	0	0	0
	DF	(England) ENG	Goodeve	6	0	5+1	0	0	0	0	0
	GK	(England) ENG	Downsborough	3	0	3	0	0	0	0	0
	MF	(England) ENG	Bromley	3	0	2	0	0	0	1	0
	MF	(England) ENG	Conway	1	0	0+1	0	0	0	0	0
	MF	(England) ENG	Murray	1	0	0+1	0	0	0	0	0
	FW	(England) ENG	Busby	1	0	0+1	0	0	0	0	0
	GK	(England) ENG	Hillyard	0	0	0	0	0	0	0	0
	GK	(England) ENG	Sherwood	0	0	0	0	0	0	0	0

- Source: https://www.11v11.com/teams/brighton-and-hove-albion/tab/players/season/1974/
