= Edith García Buchaca =

Cuban communist activist (1916–2015)

- Born: 1916; Brooklyn, New York
- Died: 9 February 2015 (aged 98–99); Havana, Cuba
- Occupations: Civil servant, activist
- Years active: 1933–1964
- Spouse(s): Carlos Rafael Rodríguez (div. 1950); Joaquín Ordoqui Mesa (1952–1973)

Edith García Buchaca (1916–2015) was one of the highest ranking members of the Communist Party in Cuba from 1935 to 1964. Active in leftist politics and women's issues as a teenager in Cienfuegos, she joined the Communist Party in 1935 and strove to organize the women's wing, which was active in initiatives to improve workers' conditions. She joined and became a leader in the Union of Radical Women and participated in the Third Congress of Cuban Women in 1939. She was a successful candidate in the 1940 general election and served on the Constitutional Convention. García successfully introduced women's rights issues raised by the women's congress for consideration and inclusion in the 1940 Constitution.

Supporting anti-fascist measures during World War II, in 1941 García co-founded the National Anti-Fascist Front. She was a co-founder and the first president of the Democratic Federation of Cuban Women, formed in 1948 as an affiliate of the Women's International Democratic Federation (WIDF). García was a delegate to the WIDF 1948 Congress in Budapest, the 1949 Conference on Asian Women held in Beijing, and was elected to the 1953 Executive Council of WIDF. She was a leader in the Hands Off Korea campaign of the 1950s, a Cuban protest to the Korean War.

From 1945, García worked at the Institute of Cuban-Soviet Cultural Exchange, encouraging intellectuals to share their knowledge. After Fidel Castro's failed attack on the Moncada Barracks in 1953, her husband was arrested along with other leftists who opposed the regime of Fulgencio Batista. Upon his release the couple and their children went into exile, finally settling in Mexico in 1956. From there they were active in Communist initiatives against various dictatorships in Latin America and the Caribbean, but did not support insurrection. When the Cuban Revolution triumphed in 1959, they returned to Cuba. García worked as the secretary of the National Institute of Culture, until the National Council of Culture was created in 1961, where she was also secretary.

Appointed as the head of cultural initiatives for the Communist Party, from 1961 to 1964, García was instrumental in institutionalizing cultural programs and establishing schools and facilities to promote the arts. Her pamphlet La teoría de la superestructura: la literatura y el arte (The Theory of the Superstructure: Literature and Art, 1961) was influential in the development of policies adapting the arts to meet socialist goals. Debates about whether the purpose of art was aesthetic or utilitarian led to the government's cultural censorship program, although in her era no forms of artistic expression were banned as long as they supported revolutionary ideals. In 1964, García was accused of protecting Marcos Rodríguez Alfonso ("Marquito") who had informed on activists behind the Directorio Revolucionario 13 de Marzo, leading to the Humboldt 7 massacre. She denied involvement and was exonerated by Castro. After her husband was accused of being a CIA informant, which she denied, the couple were arrested in 1964. From 1965 until her death in 2015, she lived under house arrest, despite never being tried for a criminal offense.

== Early life and education ==
Edith García Buchaca was born in 1916 in Brooklyn, New York. (Note: Historian Michelle Chase gives 1917 in Havana for García's birth, but Cuban sources routinely use 1916, or indicate she was 99 at death.) During her childhood, she lived in Cienfuegos and met Carlos Rafael Rodríguez, who later became a lawyer, intellectual, and a high ranking member of the Cuban Communist Party. García was raised in a middle-class family and studied socio-economic and political science, before completing her studies in law. In the 1930s, she was involved in radical student leftist and feminist political activities. She and Rodríguez were founding members of the Grupo Ariel (Ariel Group), which was created in 1933 to allow young radicals to explore revolutionary thought. The Student Left Wing opposed the dismissal of professors during the Ramón Grau presidency and were generally critical of his administration. Grau was eventually replaced in 1934 by Carlos Mendieta in an attempt to quell the radicals. That year Rodríguez moved to Havana, and the couple joined the Cuban Communist Party in 1935, which later became the Popular Socialist Party. Around this time, she and Rodríguez married and had two daughters, Annabelle and Dania.

== Career ==
=== Women's rights (1935–1953) ===
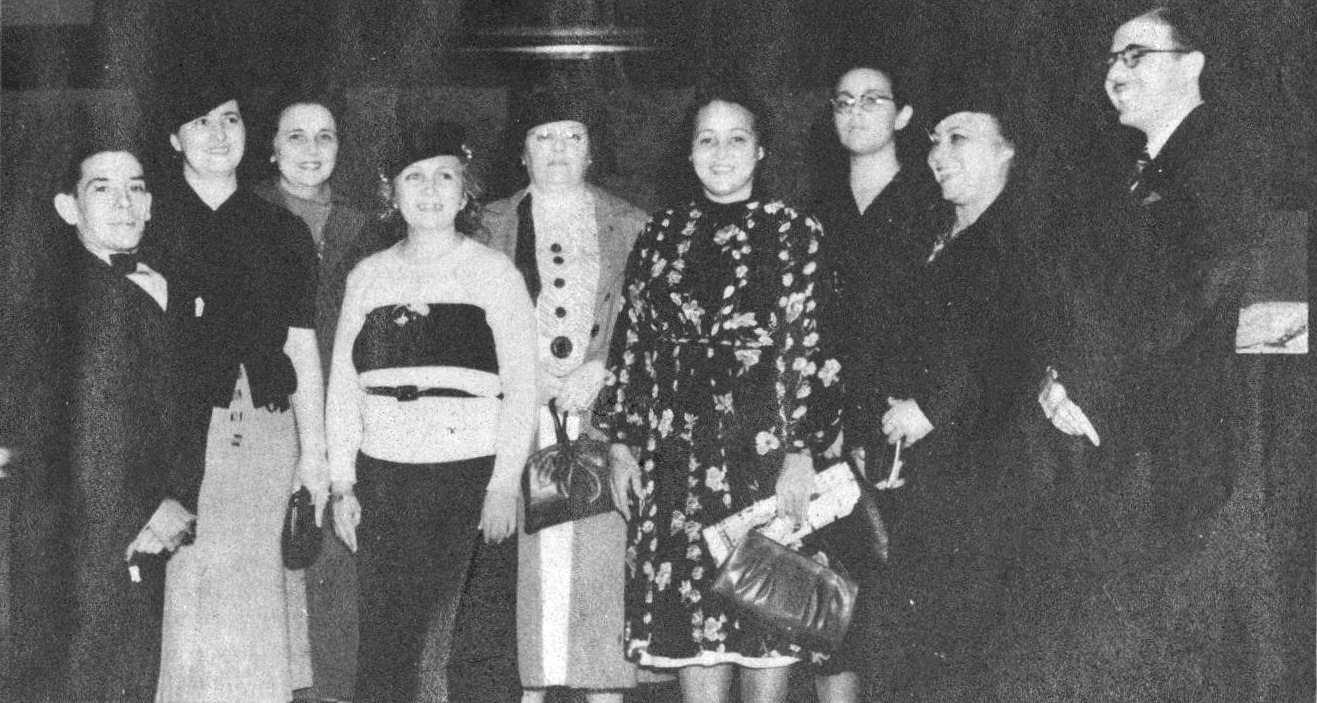
Executive committee of the Cuban Women's Congress in 1938

García worked with María Luisa Soler to organize the women's wing of the Communist Party. Their initiatives included proposals for equal pay, anti-discrimination legislation in the workplace, and measures in support of the right to sit. When the party was renamed in 1937 (Note: The Cuban Communist Party was created in 1925, but was a minor party and was outlawed in 1927 and went underground. It continued to be a small and ineffective group, until 1933, when the party led a general strike to oust the government. President Gerardo Machado offered leaders legal recognition if they would call off the strike, which they refused to do. At the end of the Cuban Revolution of 1933, the communists remained in opposition to the government under President Grau. The party had limited influence in the country until 1940, when President Batista negotiated an agreement for their support in exchange for allowing them to reorganize the labor movement. The party gained official legal status in Cuba in 1941.) as the Unión Revolucionaria Comunista (Revolutionary Communist Union), she and ten other radical women, including cigar industry organizer Teresa García and poet María Villar Buceta, actively opposed the policies of President Federico Laredo Brú. She joined the Unión Radical de Mujeres (Union of Radical Women), a group which had formed in 1933 as a labor organization. García Buchaca became a leader of the group, working to legalize workers' unions and have employers recognize their arbitration rights, to nationalize Cuba's large agricultural estates, and to generally improve socio-political rights. In 1939, she served on the executive committee for the third Congress of Cuban Women. Working with other leading women, such as Vicentina Antuña, Ana Etchegoyen de Cañizares and Concepción Castañedo, she brought together two thousand women to discuss women's and children's issues, such as child labor, equal pay, land distribution, maternity rights, racial discrimination, and sex education. They also discussed the rise of fascism in Europe, interference of the United States in the Caribbean and Latin American states, and the politics of peace. García was a successful candidate for the Unión Revolucionaria Comunista in the 1940 general election, and became a participant in the Constitutional Convention. She brought forward the issues raised at the Women's Congress, demanding firm guarantees in the constitution for gender and racial equality. Among the provisions included were Article 20, which barred discrimination based on class, color, race, or sex; Article 43, which guaranteed married women equality; Article 44, which eliminated discrimination based on legitimacy; and Article 172, which established provision for a yet to be created tribunal to resolve legal conflicts with existing legislation, such as the family code, which vested family authority in the husband and father. The constitution required enabling legislation to be passed, yet although a commission was formed to draw up a new Civil Code in 1939, lawmakers failed to adopt the draft. It took another decade before women's rights were fully realized, with Law 9, Ley de Equiparaciôn de los Derechos Civiles de la Mujer (Women's Civil Rights Equalization Law) being passed on 20 December 1950.

During World War II, García became involved in anti-fascist and anti-imperialist activities. She joined organizations, such as the Liga de Mujeres Americanas en Defensa de la Democracia Continental (League of American Women in Defense of Continental Democracy), and was a co-founder of the Frente Nacional Antifascista (National Anti-Fascist Front) formed in 1941. The Unión Revolucionaria Comunista became the Partido Socialista Popular (Popular Socialist Party) in 1944, and García began serving on its National Committee. In 1945, she produced the Radio Mil Diez program Cuba en la post–guerra (Cuba in the Post-War), interviewing politicians and dignitaries about political issues. That year, she also helped establish the Instituto de Intercambio Cultural Cubano-Soviético (Institute of Cuban-Soviet Cultural Exchange), in an effort to encourage intellectuals in the two countries to share their knowledge. In 1946, García's affair with Joaquín Ordoqui Mesa triggered a scandal because of the high positions in the Communist Party of each member of the love triangle. Carlos Rafaél Rodríguez, García's husband was a former cabinet minister during the presidency of Fulgencio Batista and the editor of the Communist Party's newspaper Hoy (Today). Between 1944 and 1948, Ordoqui was a high-ranking party member and the vice president of the Cuban Chamber of Deputies. According to writer Carlos Alberto Montaner, what should have been a private matter became a public spectacle when the Central Committee of the Popular Socialist Party ordered a tribunal composed of Aníbal Escalante, Nicolás Guillén, Blas Roca, and Lázaro Peña to rule on the matter and make a statement about the high moral conduct expected of party members. The lengthy trail resulted in reprimands and sanctions for the deception by García and Ordoqui against Rodríguez.

García and Ana M. Hidalgo joined with activists Mirta Aguirre, María Argüelles, Celia Machado, Candelaria Rodríguez, Caridad Sánchez, Cipriana Vidaurreta, and María Josefa Vidaurreta to found the Federación Democrática de Mujeres Cubanas (Democratic Federation of Cuban Women, FDMC) in 1948. García was elected as president of the organization which was an affiliate of the Women's International Democratic Federation. She became director of Mujeres Cubanas (Cuban Women), the monthly magazine of the FDMC. She was one of the Cuban delegates to the 1948 Budapest Congress of WIDF and to the 1949 Beijing Asian Women's Conference. That year spoke at the Congreso Nacional por la Paz (National Congress for Peace) held in Havana, advocating for the development of democratic systems promoting peace by eliminating militarism, racism, and ideological persecution. In 1953, she was elected to serve on the Executive Committee of the WIDF. In 1950, she organized with Candelaria Rodríguez, who participated in the 1951 investigation of conditions in North Korea, an anti-war initiative known as "Hands Off Korea". The campaign aimed at preventing Cuban troops from participating in the Korean War and was successful in changing public opinion from favoring Cuban involvement. García and Ordoqui married in 1952, the year when Batista staged a coup d'état to return to power. García had a son, Joaquín Ordoqui García, in Havana in May 1953, and in July Fidel Castro organized an attack on the Moncada Barracks, which sparked the Cuban Revolution. In the aftermath of the attack, rebels as well as political opponents were arrested by the Servicio de inteligencia militar (Military Intelligence Service, SIM). Ordoqui was among the communist activists arrested on the day of the attack and denied any involvement. He was incarcerated in the same cell block as Castro in the Boniato Provincial Prison. At the September trial, Ordoqui was acquitted.

== Exile (1953–1959) ==
Soon after Ordoqui's release in 1953, because of continued pressure on communists, the couple went into exile with the children. They temporarily lived in Paris, Prague, Moscow and Beijing, before settling in Mexico at the end of 1956. During their time abroad they had taken party instruction in China and the Soviet Union and attended a peace conference in Vienna in 1954. While in Mexico they collaborated with those trying to oust Batista from power, but adhered to the position of the Popular Socialist Party between 1952 and the end of 1958, namely that resistance should be peaceful and not an insurgency. García, Ordoqui, and other exiles in Mexico who were members of the Popular Socialist Party actively worked with the Central Committee of the Mexican Communist Party and politicians throughout the Caribbean against regimes of Batista, Rafael Trujillo of the Dominican Republic, and Marcos Pérez Jiménez of Venezuela. The Communist International did not support revolutionary action in Latin America. Influenced by a major famine in the USSR in the late 1940s as well as the political repressions under Stalin and the effects of McCarthyism in the United States, Castro did not believe communist policy would be able to resolve Cuba's socio-political and economic problems.

Castro and the other rebels arrested after the Moncada Barracks attack were pardoned in 1955. Fidel and his brother Raúl Castro went to Mexico, where they met with Camilo Cienfuegos, Che Guevara, and others to undergo military training for the invasion of Cuba. The rebels returned to Cuba in 1956 and waged guerrilla warfare against Batista's troops for the next two years. Batista fled the country at New Years (Note: Some sources say during the night of 31 December 1958, while others say in the early morning of 1 January 1959.) and on 2 January 1959, Havana fell to Castro's troops. Castro was still undecided about what type of government should be established and felt very little affinity toward either "capitalism [which] starves people to death, [or] Communism [… which] resolves the economic problem, but suppresses the liberties which are so dear to men". By 1958, Castro had already put forth a plan to have Manuel Urrutia Lleó, a liberal, but anti-communist lawyer, serve as Cuban president. Urrutia did not support Batista, who had ruled in favor of revolutionaries, and he had successfully negotiated on their behalf with the United States Department of State. Urrutia was also likely to meet with US and Cuban approval, and agreed to grant Castro authority to direct policy decisions during his presidency. Urrutia was declared as president on 3 January, and later that month García and Ordoqui returned to Cuba.

=== Cultural affairs (1959–1964) ===
García was appointed as the secretary of the Instituto Nacional de Cultura (National Institute of Culture) upon their return. Within six months of Urrutia's presidency, the moderate land reform created by a task force made up of members of Castro's 26th of July Movement and the Popular Socialist Party went into force. Urrutia openly opposed the reform, and was forced to resign and leave the country. Castro was persuaded by a group made up of Che Guevara, Raúl Castro, Carlos Rafael Rodríguez, Ordoqui, and García to replace Urrutia with Osvaldo Dorticós, a lawyer and communist, who had worked on the land reform legislation. After the Bay of Pigs Invasion, launched by Cuban exiles with US backing, the Cuban government moved closer to the Soviet Union and announced adherence to Marxist–Leninist ideology. Socialism, the interim step between capitalism and communism, per Lenin, was pursued until 1963. From that date through the end of the 1970s, the government policies strove to implement communism. Although the Popular Socialist Party had never had broad public support or a strong influence on governance, in the early period Castro relied on its members because they understood communist orthodoxy and the Soviet organizational structures. The leader of these pre-Revolutionary communists at that time was Aníbal Escalante with César Escalante in charge of propaganda, Carlos Rafael Rodríguez heading economic planning, and García leading cultural affairs for the Popular Socialist Party. Although pre-Revolutionary communists were included in the regime, the economic, financial, and military sectors of the government were headed by members of the 26 July Movement. The cultural sector was seen as non-vital and was dominated by pre-Revolutionary communists, with little involvement by 26 July Movement members.

In 1961, when the Consejo Nacional de Cultura (National Council of Culture) was created, García became its secretary, serving under president Vicentina Antuña and vice president Alejo Carpentier. (Note: Antuña was president of the National Council of Culture between 1961 and 1963. She was succeeded by Carlos Lechuga, who served until replaced by Eduardo Muzio, followed by the final president Luis Pavón. Carpentier served as vice president until 1966, and was succeeded by Lisandro Otero.) García published a pamphlet early that year, La teoría de la superestructura: la literatura y el arte (The Theory of the Superstructure: Literature and Art) which outlined her views on art and literature from a Marxist perspective. Writer Rebecca Gordon-Nesbitt stated that the booklet stripped art and literature of its social value and focused on culture as a means of production and consumption with specific socialist goals. Art historian Doreen Weppler-Grogan wrote that the pamphlet argued that artists should use their art to help "workers overcome their petit bourgeouis habits and prejudices" and to promote conformity with the ideology of the regime. According to Stephen Gregory, a Latin American Studies professor, García believed like Mao Zedong that art and literature could function politically to accelerate the transition to socialism and therefore, its "practicle usefulness" was more important than aesthetics. Writer Antón Arrufat said that García's text became influential because it provided an innovative road map to address cultural issues and because no one else made any alternative proposals. As a first step, the council organized schools for ballet, modern dance, visual and dramatic arts, and music. Mirta Aguirre served as director of the theater and dance segments of the National Council of Culture, Carpentier and José Lezama Lima headed the publications department, and María Teresa Freyre de Andrade was in charge of libraries. José Ardévol and Harold Gramatges were responsible for music and Isabel Monal was placed in charge of the Amateur Movement. The council hired Ricardo Porro, and Italians Vittorio Garatti, and Roberto Gottardi, as the architects to design the facilities for each of the five disciplines. They launched a literacy campaign, which aimed to make culture a foundational part of education, and aimed to transform cultural institutions from organizations serving the elite into facilities to train workers' children. The council established the Dirección Nacional de Museos y Monumentos, (National Directorate of Museums and Monuments), later known as the Dirección de Patrimonio Cultural (Directorate of Cultural Heritage), to formulate museum policy and train specialists, as well as spearhead restoration, preservation, and policies for cultural heritage, under the direction of Marta Arjona Pérez.

At the time, there were three prevailing views on what constituted revolutionary culture: those who defined culture within an orthodox Marxist view, those who believed that culture should focus on educating the masses to understand their own history and traditions, and those who thought that culture should elevate society by making the best aspects of world culture available to the general populace. The orthodox view was held by García, essayist José Antonio Portuondo, and Mirta Aguirre. The second group were linked with the cultural group Nuestro Tiempo (Our Time) and the Instituto Cubano del Arte e Industria Cinematográficos (Cuban Institute of Cinematic Art and Industry, ICAIC), both directed by Alfredo Guevara Valdés, and his collaborators Julio García Espinosa and Tomás Gutiérrez Alea. The last group included intellectuals involved with the newspaper Revolución, directed by Carlos Franqui, and its cultural supplement Lunes de Revolución, which was edited by Guillermo Cabrera Infante. These camps came into conflict in April 1961, when a film, P.M. (meaning post-midday), (Note: The film had been shot by Orlando Jiménez Leal at the request of Franqui to film the military preparadness in opposing the Bay of Pigs invasion. The 4-minute film also included images of soldiers and civilians relaxing in bars. Deeming the material inappropriate as part of the propaganda efforts to show Cuban solidarity in opposition to the invasion, it was rejected by Channel 2 after Jiménez refused to edit out the offending scenes. Instead, he edited out all of the military preparations, and focused on the bohemian night life of the city, filming with Sabá Cabrera additional scenes of nighttime frivolity. The film was also rejected by ICAIC on grounds that it was "demeaning to the revolution" because it focused on people who were unenlightened about the political situation, and confiscated. It was acquired on the black market and then aired by Lunes during their Monday cultural program on Channel 2.) produced by Sabá Cabrera Infante, brother of Guillermo, and cameraman Orlando Jiménez Leal was rejected by ICAIC, but aired on a televised broadcast by Lunes in late May. Guillermo Cabrera Infante was alarmed by the censorship of the film and rallied artists to come to its defense. Alfredo Guevara organized a screening at the Casa de las Américas on 31 May by the committee which was working to organize the first congress of intellectuals and artists. In attendance were Guevara, Julio García Espinosa, Nicolas Guillén, Mirta Aguirre, García, and a large number of artists and intellectuals. Censorship of the film was upheld by the ICAIC, but protest continued until Castro (Note: Some sources state that the censorship meetings were initiated by García, and that she was responsible for the demise of Lunes.) ordered a series of formal debates to convene on successive Fridays 16, 23, and 30 June at the National Library José Martí. García served as the moderator of the events. On the last day, Castro made a speech, known as "Palabras a los intelectuales" ("Words to the Intellectuals"), announcing the new censorship policy of the regime, which disapproved of works that were not seen as furthering the Revolutionary ideals. He asserted the right of the government to censor artistic output which was not useful in furthering the interests of society.

In the aftermath of the meetings, Lunes de Revolucion ceased publication and the Unión de Escritores y Artistas de Cuba (National Union of Writers and Artists of Cuba) was founded under the direction of Guillén. According to Ethnomusicologist Robin D. Moore, García was the driving force for the organization's establishment, and Arrufat acknowledged that it was the Soviet influence of institutionalizing culture that was behind its creation, rather than any involvement of the 26 July Movement. In August 1961, the First National Congress of Writers and Artists was held, where it was announced by Portuondo that artistic freedom would be allowed so long as the Revolutionary spirit was present in artistic works. Art critic Luis Camnitzer stated that García's belief was that works evoking Revolutionary ideals should be promoted, while those that did not, should be harshly critiqued. Poet and activist Lourdes Casal stated that until 1968 the policy allowed any artistic expression which provided basic support for the Revolution. After consultations to integrate local, regional, and national initiatives on culture within the six Provinces of Cuba that existed at that time, in 1962, a policy directive was issued which set out initiatives to train artists and instructors and to promote cultural activities for the public.

In 1963 another series of debates ensued over the place of avant-garde art in Cuba. Works by Hugo Consuega, Guido Llinás, and Tomás Oliva were removed or destroyed on the initiative of García and Osmany Cienfuegos. According to Alfredo Guevara, García complained to him about spending government funds on abstract art, because it did nothing to further revolutionary ideals. On one side of the issue were those who advocated for aesthetic experimentation and openness in cultural expression, while the other side advocated for artistic production to be carried out under specific pedagogical criteria which prioritized the messages and goals of the regime. Juan Blanco and Julio García Espinosa argued that Cuban artists should look for inspiration outside of the Soviet sphere and create works that furthered the spiritual development of man. (Note: In the wake of the 1962 Cuban Missile Crisis in which the Soviets negotiated with the United States to remove missiles on Cuban soil without Cuban input, trust between Cuba and the Soviet Union was damaged.) Many of the filmmakers associated with ICAIC adopted the position that aesthetics were not related to social class and could not easily be labeled as mere upper- and middle-class decadence. García published "Consideraciones sobre un manifiesto" ("Considerations about a Manifesto") in October, which while recognizing the diversity of human culture, maintained that only those works which represented the universalist nature of cultural heritage should be preserved. She advocated for development of new art forms that were representative of a classless society, and affirmed her position that the government's role was to direct the development of culture and its promotion. Mirta Aguirre and University of Havana aesthetics professor Juan Fló agreed with García that aesthetic movements which occurred in non-socialist societies could not be given the same importance as those which originated within a socialist sphere. The debates continued in publications on both sides until Portuondo released "Contrarréplica a Fornet" ("Counterreply to Fornet") in 1964, which argued that revolutionary thought must be unified. He stated, "No podemos jugar con las palabras. Estamos todos metidos hasta el cuello en la más trascendental empresa de nuestra historia: Estamos realizando una Revolución, y una Revolución Socialista. Todo lo que hagamos ha de ser para esto." ("We cannot play with words. We are all neck-deep in the most transcendental undertaking in our history: We are carrying out a Revolution, a Socialist Revolution. Everything we do must be for this.")

== Party purge ==
In 1961, the 26 July Movement and the Popular Socialist Party merged to form the Partido Unido de la Revolución Socialista de Cuba (United Party of the Cuban Socialist Revolution, PURS). Although Castro announced in December of that year the commitment of the Cuban Revolution to Marxist-Leninist doctrine, according to a news report in The Washington Post by Norman Gall, Russian Embassy officials in Havana encouraged members of the Popular Socialist Party to consolidate their power in order to reduce that of Castro and his associates at the head of the government. After the elevation of several prominent former Popular Socialist Party, pre-Revolutionary communist members to cabinet posts, Castro intervened and expelled both Cuba's highest ranking party member Aníbal Escalante, who he sent to Czechoslovakia, and Russian ambassador Sergei Kudrievstsev. García and Ordoqui survived the 1962 purge, but the arrest (Note: Marcos Rodríguez Alfonso was arrested and extradited from Prague in March 1961, but his arrest was not generally revealed until July 1962.) and trials of Marcos Rodríguez Alfonso ("Marquito"), offered Castro an opportunity to continue to purge pre-Revolutionary communists and enhance his own image. Marquito confessed that he had informed on activists who were part of the Directorio Revolucionario 13 de Marzo, who had planned an assassination attempt against President Batista in 1957. Police raided the organization's headquarters, killing the activists in an event that became known as the Humboldt 7 massacre. During the trial, Marquito admitted that he had been a member of the PSP youth wing, Juventud Socialista (Socialist Youth), and thereafter, the trial became a vehicle to attack former PSP members. Marquito was found guilty on 19 March and sentenced to death for informing on the activists and causing their death.

The verdict was immediately appealed and the second trial began on 23 March. It was broadcast live and, according to Latin American research specialist and Soviet spy Maurice Halperin, was carefully orchestrated to ensure that the government was exonerated of any wrong-doing or lack of transparency in its arrest and prosecution of Marquito. During the first day of the second trial, Marquito stated that he had confessed his role in the Humbolt 7 massacre to García, in 1958. Major Guillermo Jiménez testified that Marquito had been arrested for the crime in 1959, but released after discussing with Ordoqui and Carlos Rafael Rodríguez as to whether Marquito should remain in custody during the investigation. Major Faure Chomón, whose testimony in the first trial had been an indictment of the pre-revolutionary communists and which had become widely debated in media, was forced to retract his prior statements. García took the stand on the second day of the trial and spoke for forty-five minutes. She detailed her history as a militant Marxist communist since the age of fifteen. She vehemently denied Marquito's allegations, but acknowledged that when he came to Mexico as a destitute student, she and Ordoqui had fed and housed him for a year. She also protested that the trial was being used to discredit and attack pre-Revolutionary communists, specifically calling Marquito's "slanderous fabrications" part of an orchestrated attempt to defame the reputations of dedicated party members. She dismissed the testimony of Majors Jiménez and Chomón, who blamed former PSP members for their improper mentoring of Marquito in the first trial. She stated that Marquito was being trained by a group planning an invasion of Cuba and the majors were merely trying to create anti-communist sentiment against older members of the party.

Ordoqui testified that he had also attempted to help Marquito secure a scholarship to study in Prague when they met in Mexico in 1958, but his attempts were unsuccessful. He stated that upon returning to Cuba and learning that Marquito had been arrested, he recommended releasing him because there was no evidence, only suspicion of his guilt. Ordoqui said that he told Marquito not to accept the Czech scholarship offered to him in 1959 because he was under investigation. Carlos Rafael Rodríguez's testimony confirmed the statements of Ordoqui that there had been no actual evidence against Marquito. President Osvaldo Dorticós testified that when Castro learned of the accusation against García in October 1963, he reported it to Dorticós, who in turn informed Ordoqui. They then told García, who demanded that she be allowed to confront Marquito. The meeting between them was taped and played at the trial, confirming that Marquito had retracted his claim of having told her he was an informant. On the last day of the trial, Castro took the stand. He called into question parts of Marquito's confession, specifically regarding his membership in the socialist youth organization and his telling García that he had been an informant. Castro also discharged pre-Revolutionary communists from any responsibility for the release of Marquito in 1959 and exonerated García, but criticized Ordoqui for endorsing Marquito's party membership in 1958, for not using his influence to cancel Marquito's Czech scholarship to keep him in Cuba, and for corresponding with Marquito in 1962.

Because of other specifics in the confession which accurately described the apartment where Marquito had met with police, Castro stated that he believed Marquito was guilty, had acted alone, and was sane. On 30 March the court confirmed Marquito's guilt, and he was executed in April. After the publicity surrounding the trial diminished, Castro resumed his purge to eliminate pre-Revolutionary communists with close ties to the USSR. In November 1964, Ordoqui was removed from all of his positions in the government and party, and García was expelled from National Council of Culture. They disappeared from public view until 17 April 1973, when it was announced by the political bureau in Granma that Ordoqui was arrested, as an accused spy for the CIA, and held in prison until January 1965, when it was decided that an investigation into the allegations, which Ordoqui denied, would be lengthy. The statement continued that while convinced of Ordoqui's guilt, insufficient evidence existed to take him to trial and given his poor health, the restrictions against Ordoqui were to be suspended. Ordoqui died of cancer two months later, on 19 June 1973.

== Later life, death, and legacy ==
No mention of García's fate was disclosed in the Granma article, although Halperin speculated in 1981 that she likely shared the experiences of Ordoqui. When her son Joaquín died in 2004, it was revealed that she also had been placed under house arrest and held without trial. All of her children lived in exile in Madrid. Both of García's daughters located there in the early years after the Cuban Revolution. After being exiled to Peru in 1986, her son relocated to Madrid in 1994. García was never tried nor rehabilitated by the government. She died on 9 February 2015, in Havana and was cremated.

Scholar Historian Michelle Chase noted that although García was very influential in her era, she has received little scholarly interest beyond an interview with her by Abel Sierra Madero in 2011 and a few studies focusing solely on her role in the cultural repression of the early 1960s in Cuba. Most of the sources available about García depict her as a rigid and dogmatic communist functionary, who attempted to steer the arts in Cuba toward Socialist realism. In the interview with Sierra Madero, García acknowledged that she played a part in the censorship program and was aware that she was seen as being responsible for it, but she stated that she never had the authority to make decisions and followed the directives of the party and her superiors. According to the entry in the Diccionario de la literatura Cubana policies of the National Council of Culture were established and implemented by the Presidency Council, whose members included the president, vice president, the directors, and others "deemed appropriate". Gordon-Nesbitt stated that García was president of the National Council of Culture and had the highest level of authority in cultural matters. She placed García and Mirta Aguirre at the top of the hierarchy and characterized Antuña, as being under García's authority and Carpentier, as a moderate, with little influence in the organization. Writer Guillermo Cabrera Infante acknowledged that García was the head of culture for the party and Antuña led the council, but said that Antuña was "under the political spell of Buchaca [sic]". Art and architecture historian John A. Loomis said that García "wielded equal or greater power" than Antuña, as Antuña headed the National Council of Culture but García was in charge of cultural affairs for the Communist Party. Moore stated that García was the first president of the council and that "with the support [of] the highest levels, she embarked on the ambitious sponsorship of painting and sculpture, concerts, music, dancing, and theater". He credited García with the "majority" of the cultural ideas and initiatives that created the amateurs' movement, training centers for artists, support for the symphony, and the writer's union, but acknowledged that, having fallen out of favor, little information was available about her in the first decade of the twenty-first century.

Some family members of the victims of the Humboldt 7 massacre insist that García was a paid informant for the CIA and shielded Marquito. Scholars and writers are divided on the extent of García or Ordoqui's involvement. Newton Briones Montoto's book Víctima o culpable (Victim or Culprit, 2011) concluded that the couple did not have the authority to protect Marquito. Briones stated that if they had the authority, they could have had him released when he was rearrested and held for two and a half years before trial, but they did not do so. Miguel Barroso in his research into the Marquito's case, published in Un asunto sensible (A Sensitive Matter, 2019), revealed information that the CIA fabricated information against Ordoqui to prevent the smooth merger of and unity in the pre- and post-Revolution communist groups. (Note: Historian Julio César Guanche said that this was confirmed by a statement made by former-head of the Cuban State Security Service, Fabián Escalante Font, who told Guance that documents declassified by the CIA in 1999, confirmed that the agency sold false information about the couple to the Cuban embassy in Mexico.) CIA operative-turned-writer Philip Agee in his work Inside the Company: CIA Diary (1975), claimed that Ordoqui might have been an informant in the early 1950s, but later refused to continue, which was why he became a target of CIA disinformation during the Marquito's case. Scholar Lillian Guerra wrote that "Ordoqui fue entendido por muchos militantes y estudiosos del caso como chivo expiatorio" ("Activists and scholars of the case, understood that Ordoqui was a scapegoat"), as his arrest allowed Castro to deny integration of pre-Revolutionary communists into the power structures of his regime. She characterized García as a casualty of this power clash, stating that she became officially dead because of her husband's fall from favor. Her obituary in the Spanish newspaper El País stated that she was never charged with spying for the CIA, that she flatly denied involvement with the CIA, and that she was punished because her husband was sanctioned.

== Selected works ==
- García Buchaca, Edith (1961). La teoría de la superestructura: la literatura y el arte [The Theory of the Superstructure: Literature and Art] (PDF) (in Spanish). Havana, Cuba: Ediciones del Consejo Nacional de Cultura. OCLC 27006869. Archived (PDF) from the original on 16 April 2022.
- García Buchaca, Edith (February 1963). "Primer Congreso de Cultura" [First Cultural Congress]. Cuba Socialista (in Spanish). 3 (18). Havana, Cuba: Comite Central del Partido Comunista de Cuba: 8–29. ISSN 0864-2079.
- García Buchaca, Edith (1963). Primer Congreso Nacional de Cultura: Discuros [First National Congress of Culture: Speech] (in Spanish). Havana, Cuba: Ediciones del Consejo Nacional de Cultura. OCLC 33885261.
- García Buchaca, Edith (18 October 1963). "Consideraciones sobre un manifiesto" [Considerations about a Manifesto]. La Gaceta de Cuba (in Spanish). 2 (28). Havana, Cuba: Unión de Escritores y Artistas de Cuba: 6–7. OCLC 978107869.
- García Buchaca, Edith (1963). 3 intervenciones [Three Interventions] (in Spanish). Havana, Cuba: Ediciones del Consejo Nacional de Cultura. OCLC 37713853.
- García Buchaca, Edith (January 1964). "Las transformaciones culturales de la Revolución cubana" [The Cultural Transformations from the Cuban Revolution]. Cuba Socialista (in Spanish). 4 (29). Havana, Cuba: Comite Central del Partido Comunista de Cuba: 28–54. ISSN 0864-2079.
