= Pilar Morlón de Menéndez =

Cuban suffragist

Pilar Morlón de Menéndez was a Cuban suffragist.

== Biography ==
Menéndez was a founder member of the Club Femenino de Cuba (Cuban Women's Club) in 1918, alongside Pilar Jorge de Tella, Mariblanca Sabas Alomá, Ofelia Domínguez Navarro and Hortensia Lamar.

Menéndez was president of the National Federation of Women's Associations. The federation organized the First National Women's Congress in April 1923 and she chaired the event at the Gran Teatro de La Habana in Havana. She opened the event with a speech on "nationalism." During the second congress in 1925, when she was again chair, president Gerardo Machado made a promise to introduce women's suffrage in Cuba.

Menéndez was featured in the documentary En busca de un espacio by Marilyn Solaya in 2019.
