= Pilar Jorge de Tella =

Cuban suffragist

- Born: Pilar Jorge Fernández; 24 August 1884; Pinar del Río, Captaincy General of Cuba, Spanish Empire
- Died: 26 April 1967 (aged 82)
- Other names: Pilar Jorge de Telia, Pilar J. de Tella
- Years active: 1920–1934
- Known for: Co-founder of the Club Femenino de Cuba and the National Feminist Alliance

Pilar Jorge de Tella (24 August 1884 – 26 April 1967) was a leading Cuban suffragist, active in the 1920s. She was one of the founders of the Feminine Club of Cuba and later organized the National Feminist Alliance. She presented petitions to the legislature and constitutional conventions demanding suffrage. Once suffrage was obtained, as an anti-communist, she left the political arena.

== Biography ==
De Tella was born in Pinar del Río to Vicente Jorge and Josefa Fernández.

With the passage of the 1901 Cuban Constitution, which denied the right to vote to women, several feminist organizations sprang up. One of these, the Club Femenino de Cuba Spanish: Club Femenino was founded by Pilar Jorge de Tella, Ofelia Domínguez Navarro, Hortensia Lamar, Pilar Morlón de Menéndez, Mariblanca Sabas Alomá, and other feminists in 1917 and Jorge de Tella served as its first secretary. In its early days, the organization functioned more as a humanitarian organization than one striving for political rights. It established night schools for workers, created the first training schools for nannies, fought for educational rights of women prisoners, established milk programs for schools and other programs to improve the socio-economic and educational status of women.

In 1921, the club began venturing into politics when Jorge de Tella, who was in charge of the Office of Work, testified to the Congress about labor conditions for working women. Among the demands that the Club wanted implemented were a Chair Law for sales clerks to be allowed to rest between customers, an eight-hour work day, minimum wages as well as maternity leave and child care services. They were still looking primarily at safety and social issues, but increasingly the focus changed as instability worsened. In 1923, she was a signatory to the Veterans and Patriots Association resolution to end corruption in government. As working conditions worsened, and the government failed to address labor problems and U.S. imperialism many social groups radicalized. When in April of that year, Morlón de Menéndez opened the First National Women's Congress, Jorge de Tella gave an inspired speech stressing the importance of enfranchisement. She and Domíngues Navarro and other feminists who supported the idea of giving equal rights and protections to legitimate and illegitimate children ended up leaving the conference, as the more conservative view of only protecting legitimate children prevailed.

The Second Congress, held in 1925, had a different flavor, as it brought together various church interests and was attended by President Gerardo Machado. Jorge de Tella spoke in favor of birth control causing a fissure with the feminist movement and the Catholic Community. Machaco had promised to make women's suffrage part of the constitution, though he remained inactive until 1927. With growing government unrest, he decided to add enfranchisement to a list of reforms he wanted, but the legislature rejected universal suffrage. Feminists formed the Committee for the Defense of Women's Suffrage (Spanish: Comité de Defensa del Sufragio Femenino) (CDSF) and began lobbying delegates directly. In January, 1928, the Pan-American Conference was held in Havana. Jorge de Tella and Doris Stevens spoke at the rally of women delegates representing the 21 countries of the Americas. Around 200 participants marched to demand suffrage before President Machado and the delegates of the 6th Pan-American Union. Later that year in September, at the Inter-American Commission of Women presentation to the Pan American Union, Jorge de Tella spoke along with Stevens and other delegates of the problems associated with women losing their citizenship upon marriage.

With international support giving added support, Jorge de Tella, Ofelia Domínguez Navarro, Hortensia Lamar, Rosaria Guillaume, and Rosa Arredondo de Vega presented a petition to Antonio Sánchez de Bustamante, president of the constitutional proceedings, demanding that women's right to vote be included in the constitution. The petition was rejected on the grounds that women were mentally and physically inferior to men. In 1928, Jorge de Tella and Domínguez Navarro reorganized the frustrated women merging the small organizations Committee for Civic Action (Spanish: Comité de Acción Cívico) and the CDSF into the National Feminist Alliance (Spanish: Alianza Nacional Feminista) (ANF). The ANF would become one of the most active feminist organizations of the period, though it was primarily made up of upper and middle-class women. In 1930, there was a split based on a philosophical difference between the two founders. Jorge de Tella believed the organization should be a political lobbying group and host cultural and recreational activities. Domínguez Navarro wanted an organization that worked for political, as well as economic change and supported the interests of working-class women. When Domínguez Navarro lost her bid for the presidency, she left the organization and took her followers with her. Two new organizations resulted from the fissure, Domínguez Navarro's Women's Labor Union (Spanish: Unión Laborista de Mujeres, and the Lyceum Club Femenino, which was a cultural and intellectual organization.

Unrest caused by Machado's affirmation in the election in which he was the only candidate, began to escalate into violence and rioting. In January 1931 Jorge de Tella and Hortensia Lamar organized a march demanding Machado's resignation and gathered feminists from the Alianza, Lyceum Club Femenino, and Unión. They went to the presidential palace to present their demands. As the situation worsened, Machado began retaliating and warned that he would "keep the peace at any cost. Programs aimed specifically at silencing women were launched and Jorge de Tella was arrested along with Ana Quintana, Leonora Ferreira, and Perez Reyes for demonstrating and sent to the women's prison at Guanabacoa. In 1933, Machado was forced from office and upon his resignation, prominent members of Cuban society met with U.S. embassy officials. Jorge de Tella and Hortensia Lamar were among those who met with Ambassador Sumner Welles. After a series of presidential changes, Carlos Mendieta came into power and the Alianza presented him with a demand for suffrage. On 3 February 1934, the vote was extended to Cuban women and in August of that year, Pilar Jorge de Tella was renounced by Raúl Roa García for an anti-communist editorial she published in the magazine Carteles.
