= Club Femenino de Cuba =

Cuban women's organization

The Club Femenino de Cuba was a women's organization in Cuba, founded in 1917. It was one of the major women's organizations in Pre-revolutionary Cuba, and played an important role in the struggle for women's suffrage in Cuba.

It was founded by a group of upper- and middle-class women. Among its founders were Pilar Morlón de Menéndez, Pilar Jorge de Tella, Mariblanca Sabas Alomá, Ofelia Domínguez Navarro and Hortensia Lamar. Its main purpose was to work for the introduction of women's suffrage, but it also engaged in social work, the improvement of women's right in the criminal justice system and women's greater access to education and professional life, and betterment of their working conditions.

In 1923, the Club Femenino and five other women's organizations founded and joined the umbrella organization Federación Nacional de Asociaciones Femeninas. The Federación in turn organized the Congreso Nacional de Mujeres de Cuba of 1923, which was the first national women's congress in Cuba, chaired by Pilar Morlon y Menéndez of the Club Femenino de Cuba. On the second congress in 1925, president Gerardo Machado made a promise to introduce women's suffrage. Women's suffrage was introduced by president Ramón Grau San Martín in 1934, and secured in the constitution in 1940.

Club Femenino de Cuba continued its work after the introduction of suffrage, focusing on its other goals.

Club Feminino belonged to the leading women's organisations of pre-revolutionary Cuba, alongside the reformist Partido Democrata Sufragista, the liberal Alianza Nacional Feminista, the cultural Lyceum Lawn/Tennis Club, and the marxist meritocratic Union Laborista de Mujeres.
