= Hortensia Lamar =

Cuban feminist

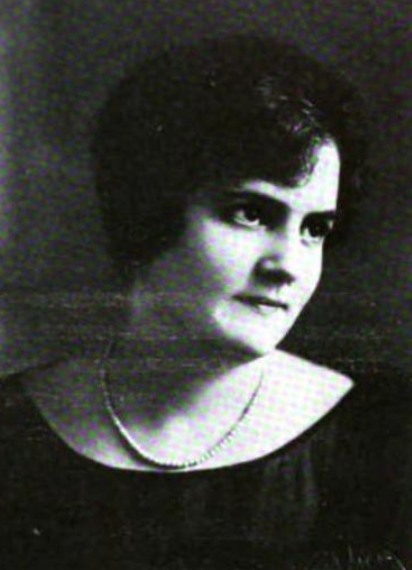
- Hortensia Lamar, from a 1923 publication
- Born: 1888
- Died: 1967 (aged 78–79)
- Occupations: Clubwoman, suffragist
- Known for: President, Club Femenino de Cuba

Hortensia Lamar y Delmonte (1888 – 1967) was a Cuban suffragist and clubwoman. She was president of the Club Femenino de Cuba and the Federación Nacional de Asociaciones Femeninas.

== Early life ==
Lamar was born to a wealthy family from Matanzas.

== Career ==
Lamar was a founder member and president of the Club Femenino de Cuba and the Federación Nacional de Asociaciones Femeninas, alongside Pilar Jorge de Tella, Mariblanca Sabas Alomá, Ofelia Domínguez Navarro and Pilar Morlón de Menéndez. She edited the club's official magazine, La mujer moderna, "the most political radical of the journals of its time". The federation of Cuban women's organizations campaigned for women's suffrage, juvenile courts, workers' rights, and women's education.

Lamar, an "energetic" "born leader", campaigned for immigration reform to abolish sex trafficking, drug abuse, and prostitution in Cuba. She also joined Cuban feminists who sought equal rights for children born to single mothers. "Let us raise up the mother! Let us raise up and protect her children!" she said in an address to the Second National Women's Congress in 1925. She served on an international women's commission, represented Cuba at the First International Feminist Conference in 1926, and was a member of the Women's Advisory Committee of the Institución Hispano-Cubana de Cultura. She also opposed bullfighting in Cuba.

After Cuban president Gerardo Machado failed to follow through on a promise to recognize Cuban women's right to the vote, Lamar joined organized opposition to Machado, contributing to his regime's defeat. In 1933, she participated in peace talks in Havana, facilitated by American diplomat Sumner Welles. "Lamar was not timid, and Welles took her seriously," noted Philip Dur and Christopher Gilcrease in 2002. She and other feminist leaders met with the next president, Carlos Manuel de Céspedes, and Cuban women's right to vote was recognized in 1934.

== Publications ==
- "La lucha contra la prostitución y la trata de blancas" (1923, "The Fight Against Prostitution and the White Slave Trade")
- "Protección y defensa del hogar cubano" (1923)
- "La mujer cubana: Su preparación y concepto social de la vida" (1932)
- "Cuida la adolescencia de tü hija" (1935)

== Personal life ==
Lamar died in 1967, in her late seventies, "still a formidable presence in her old age."
