= Powney =

Powney is a surname. Notable people with the surname include:

- Brian Powney (born 1944), English footballer
- Cassie Powney (born 1983), English actress
- Christopher Powney, artistic director and CEO of the Royal Ballet School
- Connie Powney (born 1983), English actress, twin sister of Cassie
- Peniston Powney (1690s–1757), British landowner and politician
