= Candelaria Rodríguez =

Cuban lawyer and activist

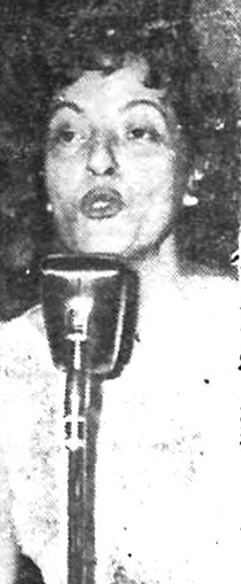
- Rodríguez speaking in Marti Park in Marianao, 1960
- Born: Candelaria Rodríguez Hernández; 23 October 1928; Havana, Cuba
- Died: After 1998
- Occupations: Lawyer, activist

Candelaria Rodríguez Hernández (born 23 October 1928 - after 1998) was a Cuban lawyer and anti-war activist. After graduating from the University of Havana in 1949, she became active in leftist causes, aimed at revising the Cuban Civil Code and improving women's rights. She was a founder of the Federación Democrática de Mujeres Cubanas (Democratic Federation of Cuban Women), an affiliation of the Women's International Democratic Federation (WIDF). In 1951, she participated in WIDF's fact-finding mission to North Korea. Upon her return to Cuba, she was jailed, but later released. Her continued efforts to prevent Cubans participating in the Korean War resulted in several more arrests and loss of her post as a legal advisor at the National Bank of Cuba. The "Hands Off Korea" campaign she led with Edith García Buchaca was effective in turning public opinion against Cuban involvement in the conflict. She attended several WIDF congresses and conferences and served on the Executive Council of the international organization from 1953.

After the Cuban Revolution, Rodríguez became a civil servant and worked in the Ministry of Labor. By 1962, she was director of the department dealing with labor policy. She was selected as one of thirty-five members of the Consejo Nacional de Juristas de Cuba (National Counsel of Cuban Jurists), established in 1977, as the Cuban branch of the Asociación Americana de Juristas (American Association of Jurists). Throughout her career, she advocated for the reunification of Korea and in 1994 published Korea Revisited after 40 Years, following a further visit to North Korea. Rodríguez received recognition in 1998 when she was appointed an honorary member of the Sociedad Cubana de Derecho Constitucional y Administrativo (Cuban Society of Constitutional and Administrative Law).

== Early life and education ==
Candelaria Rodríguez Hernández was born on 23 October 1928 in Havana, Cuba into the affluent family of a middle-class merchant. She attended elementary and secondary Catholic schools, before enrolling in law courses at University of Havana. She graduated in 1949 with a Doctorate of Law winning the Premio Nacional de Derecho Ricardo Dolz Arango (Ricardo Dolz Arango National Law Prize). At the time, there were few women lawyers in Cuba.

== Career ==
Rodríguez joined the Havana branch of the International Federation of Women Lawyers and became active in leftist politics. In particular, she supported initiatives to revise the Cuban Civil Code, which vested authority for a family in the husband and father. Adoption of a new Cuban Constitution in 1940, barred discrimination based on class, color, race, or sex, but required enabling legislation, such as revision of the civil codes, to resolve conflicts with existing legislation. Along with Mirta Aguirre, María Argüelles, Edith García Buchaca, Ana M. Hidalgo, Celia Machado, Caridad Sánchez, Cipriana Vidaurreta, and María Josefa Vidaurreta, she founded the Federación Democrática de Mujeres Cubanas (Democratic Federation of Cuban Women) in 1948. The organization immediately became affiliated with the Women's International Democratic Federation (WIDF). On 20 December 1950, Law 9, Ley de Equiparación de los Derechos Civiles de la Mujer (Women's Civil Rights Equalization Law), was passed with the necessary requirements to remove gender discrimination.

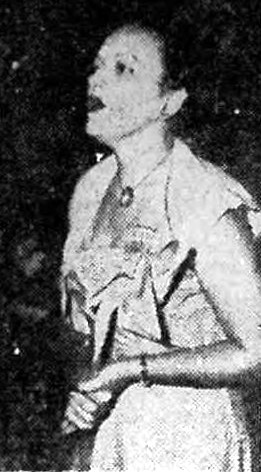
Candelaria Rodríguez at FDMC Second Congress, 1952

In 1950, Rodríguez and Edith García Buchaca organized the "Hands Off Korea" campaign, to protest the Cuban government's plans to send troops to fight in the Korean War. The following year, Rodríguez volunteered to join WIDF's fact-finding commission to North Korea. While the war was still continuing, WIDF sent twenty-one activists from Africa, the Americas, Asia, and Europe to the Korean peninsula to evaluate the effects of the conflict. They spent twelve days there in May 1951, evaluating the bombing raids carried out by the United States Air Force and war crimes committed by the United Nations Forces against civilians. The activists later wrote a report, We Accuse, which was translated into Chinese, Korean, English, German, and Spanish. While traveling back from Korea, the delegation visited Moscow and other Eastern European capitals. Rodríguez spoke on the radio in Moscow on 27 June, denouncing Cuban plans to enter the war in support of the United States. When she returned to Cuba on 10 July, she was arrested and accused of trying to destabilize the Cuban government. A trial was set for 6 August, but she did not turn up. Noticias de Hoy (Today's News), a Cuban newspaper, reported on 6 October, that she had been relieved of the charges. Rodríguez went on to speak at over 50 meetings, made radio broadcasts, and participated in conferences throughout Cuba, distributing a pamphlet presenting her Korean observations in connection with the "Hands Off Korea" campaign. It proved successful in changing public opinion and preventing Cuban involvement in the war. Her defiant activism led to numerous detentions, another two-week jailing, and loss of her position at the National Bank of Cuba.

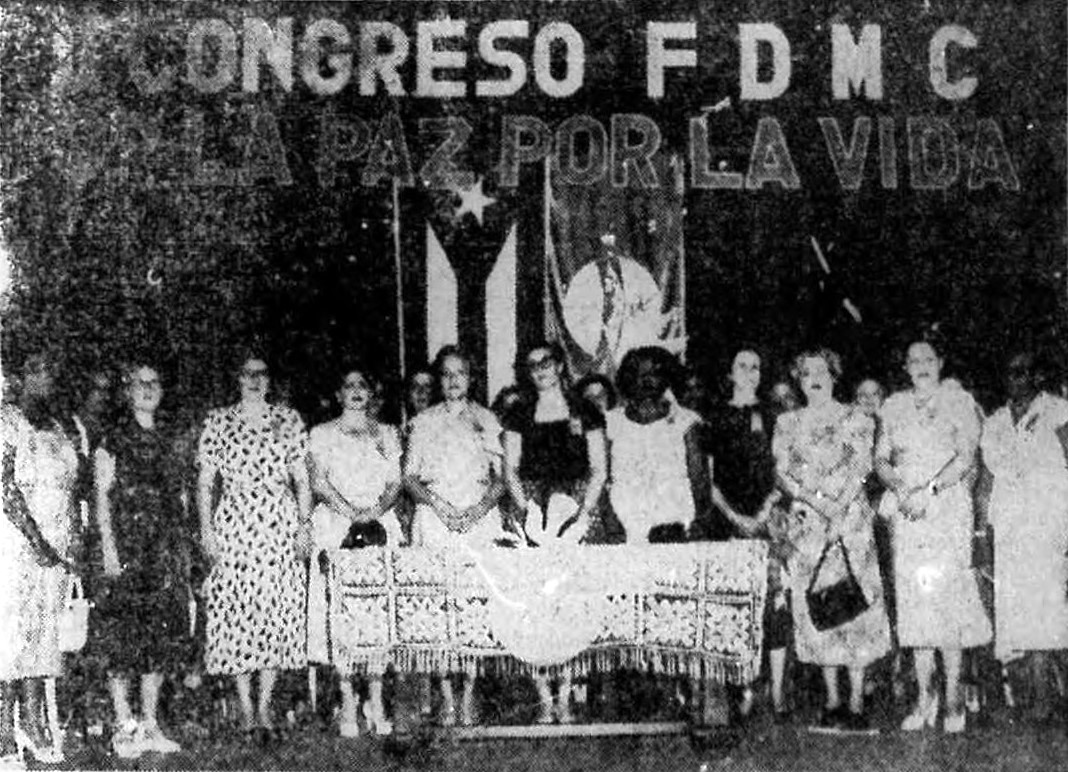
FDMC Second Congress, 1952

Rodríguez and García, along with María Argüelles, Raquel Catalá, Esther Noriega, Ofelia Radillo, Caridad Sánchez, Maria Josefa Vidaurreta, and Leonar Vizo, led the second national congress of the Democratic Federation of Cuban Women in September 1952, bringing together over 600 women. Both Rodríguez and García were elected to the Executive Committee of the WIDF in 1953. Rodríguez attended the WIDF Congress held that year in Copenhagen, as the vice president of the Democratic Federation of Cuban Women. She and Celia Machado gave an update on Cuban progress. Rodríguez was a signatory to a proclamation issued by the Popular Socialist Party, as the Cuban Communist Party was then called, condemning actions to prevent Guatemalan students from organizing a communist party in 1954. (Note: The proclamation was issued in response to pressure by the United States at the 10th Pan-American Conference held in March 1954 in Caracas, Venezuela to prevent communist organizing in Guatemala.) That year, she also attended the Conferência Latino-americana de mulheres (Latin American Conference of Women) held in Rio de Janeiro, Brazil. The conference was organized by the WIDF affiliate, the Federação de Mulheres do Brasil (Brazilian Women's Federation), to unite Latina women in their struggles for rights. WIDF organized the first Congreso Latinoamericano de Mujeres (Congress of Latin American Women) in November 1959. Rodríguez was one of the founders, and inaugural secretary, of the Unidad Femenina Revolucionaria (Feminine Revolutionary Unit) created in April 1959 by women in support of the Cuban Revolution. She served on the committee, led by Vilma Espín, that planned the Cuban delegation's activities for the congress, which was held in Santiago, Chile, although she did not personally attend the congress.

In 1960, Rodríguez was appointed to a civil service position in the Ministry of Labor. In May 1962, the Ministry first promoted her to a post with responsibility for international affairs, and the following December appointed her director of labor policy. She was one of the dignitaries who called for the 11th World Festival of Youth and Students to be held in Cuba. Their push for Cuba's selection began in 1965 with events supporting the 9th Festival hosted at the university and in theaters in Havana. (Note: The 1965 article in Noticias de Hoy states that she served as a Cuban delegate to the 4th World Festival of Youth and Students, held in Bucharest, Romania from 2 to 14 August 1953. Lionel Soto makes the same claim in his book De La Historia Y La Memoria. At the time, Rodríguez was under arrest with a pending trial set for 6 August, for which she failed to appear.) Rodríguez was selected as one of 35 members of the Consejo Nacional de Juristas de Cuba (National Counsel of Cuban Jurists) in 1977, when the organization was inaugurated as a branch of the Asociación Americana de Juristas (American Association of Jurists). By the 1980s, she was serving as a legal advisor to the center for Cuban working people. Continuing to speak in support of the reunification of Korea, Rodríguez returned to North Korea in 1993, and at the invitation of President Kim Il Sung remained there from November through January 1994. In her book titled Korea Revisited after 40 Years, she presented what she had experienced. In 1998, her work was recognized with the distinction of honorary member of the Sociedad Cubana de Derecho Constitucional y Administrativo (Cuban Society of Constitutional and Administrative Law).

== Death and legacy ==
In 2023, the Korean Central News Agency published an article remembering the friendship she had fostered between their country and Cuba during her lifetime.
