= Federation of Cuban Women =

Cuban women's organization

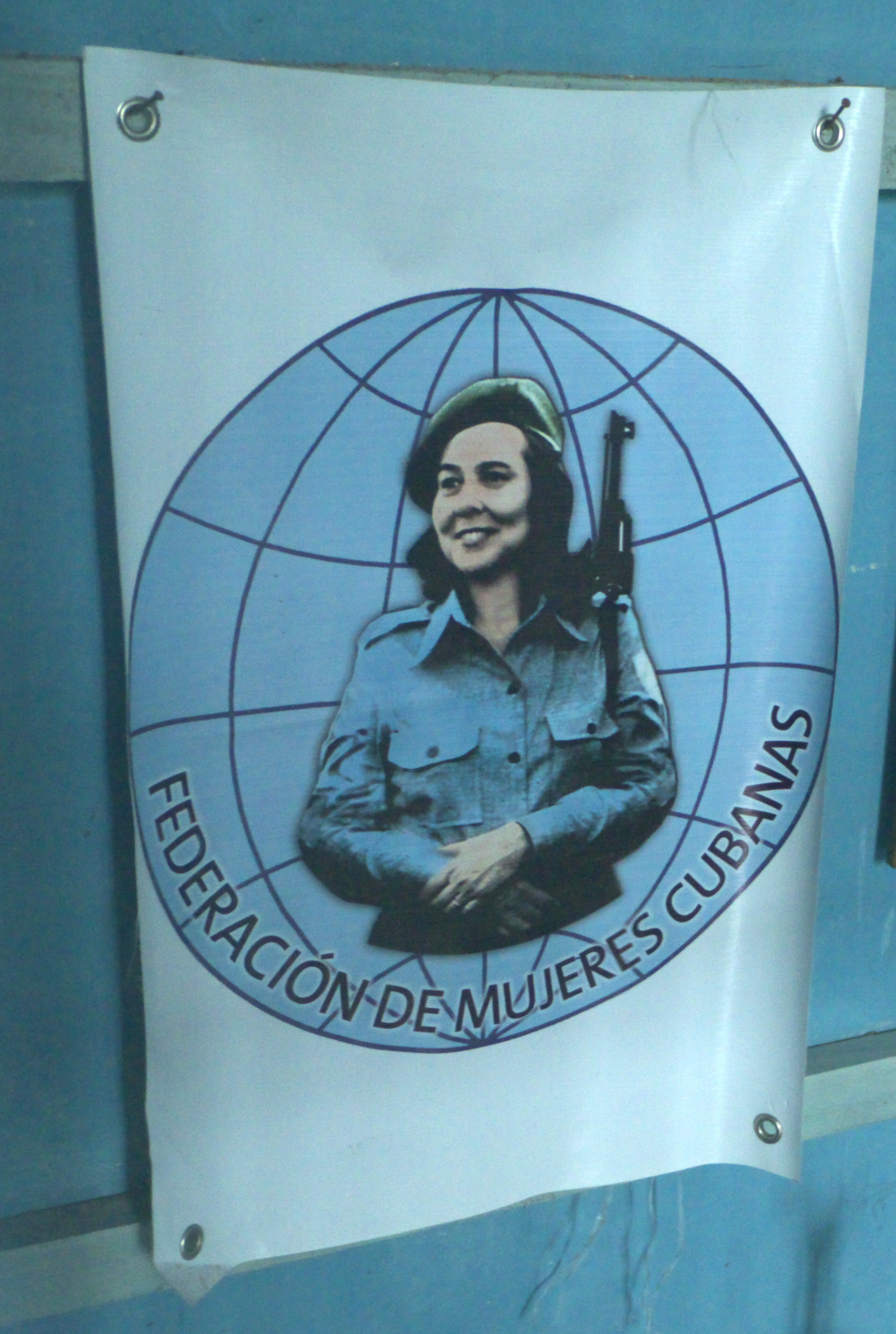
Vilma Espín was the president of the FMC

The Federation of Cuban Women (Spanish: Federación de Mujeres Cubanas) (FMC) was established in 1948 by a group of activists including Mirta Aguirre, María Argüelles, Edith García Buchaca, Ana M. Hidalgo, Celia Machado, Candelaria Rodríguez, Caridad Sánchez, Asela de los Santos, Cipriana Vidaurreta, and María Josefa Vidaurreta as the Federación Democrática de Mujeres Cubanas (Democratic Federation of Cuban Women). García was the first president of the organization, which immediately became affiliated with the Women's International Democratic Federation. In 1960, it was reorganized as the Federación de Mujeres Cubanas under the revolutionary government, with Vilma Espín as its president. Espin fought in the Sierra Maestras with Fidel Castro and Raúl Castro and married Raúl in 1959. She was the president of the FMC until her death in 2007. The FMC was deeply involved in the 1961 Cuban literacy campaign and in supplying workers after the mass exodus of trained labor following the Revolution. It also plays an integral role in Cuban disaster risk reduction, undertaking an annual vulnerability mapping exercise. The information gathered is used in emergency planning and evacuations during hurricane alerts A few of the stated goals of the FMC are:

- Bringing women out of the home and into the economy
- Reorganizing peasant households that keep women in subservient positions
- Developing communal services to alleviate domestic work and childcare
- Providing equal opportunities for women
- Mobilizing women into political work and government administration
- Providing adequate working conditions "to satisfy the particular needs of the female organism and the moral and spiritual needs of women as mothers."

== Evolution of the FMC's Goals ==
The evolution of the goals of the FMC throughout its progression can be characterized with the following statement: “The state guarantees women the same opportunities and possibilities as men in order to achieve women’s full participation in the development of the country.” As specifically claimed in the Cuban Constitution within Article 44, and drafted in 1976.

And so throughout the aforementioned goals, the Federation of Cuban Woman cemented their mission of pushing for women's involvement in economic and social matters as well as increasing the amounts of women in the workforce. The foundational framework of the FMC characterized by its leadership and presence within local, municipal, provincial, and national tiers has been pivotal in accomplishing progress at all perspective tiers. After all, advancements in reproductive health rights, gender equalization, and women's rights in Cuba post 1960 have resulted from the FMC's efforts. Composed of women stemming from diverse social backgrounds, such as from ministry decision-making positions, labor unions, and even drawing in participation from the Communist Party of Cuba, is the national directorate that reveals the women's perspective across all political and societal tiers.

In February 2021, 23.45% of parliamentary seats belonged to women within the Cuban National Assembly. This increase in woman's parliamentary occupation has listed Cuba sixth from a pool of 162 countries regarding women's amount of political participation. However, with women only possessing a 25% share of high administrative roles in Cuban government, it is evident that disparities persevere. This further portrays why the further relentless actions of the FMC are necessary for women's political progress in Cuba.

== FMC & The Cuban Literacy Campaign ==
The Cuban Literacy Campaign was a national effort to eradicate illiteracy in Cuba following the 1959 Revolution. Shortly after the Revolution, motivated by patriotism and sustained by political will, Fidel Castro declared that illiteracy would be eradicated within 1 year. Accordingly, during 1959 and 1960 the groundwork was laid for a mass literacy campaign, La Alfabetización. In the year leading up to the campaign, the FMC was charged with identifying illiterate women and convincing them to participate. During the campaign itself "figures indicate that more than 91,000 women participated with the FMC in La Alfabetización. Thousands of women became teachers and other cared for the young boys and girls ages 11-16, who formed the Conrado Benitez Brigade." "On December 22, 1961, when Cuba was declared a "territory Free of Illiteracy" 55% of the 700,000 new literates were women.

Having had a monumental impact on Cuban women's literacy levels, the campaign instilled a learning culture and environment where none existed. As young adults in Cuba saw the revolutionary effect possible via education and literature, the FMC simultaneously established resilience and solidarity amongst the countries women, resulting in abolished social barriers, especially between rural and urban populations.

== Sex Education ==
The FMC enlisted the aid of Gynecologist and Obstetrician Celestino Alverez Lajonchere to create and lead a team in drafting the National Sex Education Policy and Program (ProNES) and the National Sex Education Working Group (GNTES) in 1972. In the 1980s, sex education was taught in colleges, universities, and daycare training centers. Media addressed sex education by means of Muchachas magazine, in the column "Hablemos Fracamente." In 1997, the FMC founded the Women's Studies Center and the National Group for Prevention of Family Violence. The FMC has been active in the National Working Group on Sex Education (Grupo Nacional de Trabajo de Educación Sexual, GNTES) and subsequently the National Center for Sex Education (CENESEX).

== FMC & The 1975 Family Code ==
1966 Fidel Castro made a speech in which he called for the addition of a million women to the labor force. Many women responded to this and entered the work force only to leave again when the burden of family and work proved too difficult. During the 1970s many improvements were made that allowed women to return to work, daycare centers were opened and other services provided. But still women lagged men in the workforce, making up only 25% of the force. In 1975 the FMC made a nationwide inquiry to investigate the reasons behind this. The result of this inquiry was the Family Code of 1975. The code gave men and women equal rights and equal responsibilities in the home and increased state social services. Some of the unique outcomes of this code were that working women were to have first rights to buy appliances that saved time, cafeterias were opened in the work place and health clinics were kept open later. Plan Jaba gave working women shopping priority. They could drop off their bags at the store in the morning together with a shopping list and pick them up in the evening on the way home already filled.

== Second National Congress of the Federacion de Mujeres Cubanas November 25–29, 1974 ==
The second national congress is an example of the work of the FMC. Its 1,916 delegates were elected in a lengthy process beginning at the grass-roots level. They came from every background and every level of education. The congress' slogan was "To Deepen Women's Revolutionary Action!" Topics covered by the congress included bringing the Family Code to Vietnam. "Close to sixteen years of revolution has produced a keenly politicized, combative Cuban Woman, capable of deep analysis, concise projection and- most impressive- with the ability to conceive of herself as a part of an immense group in which all individuals are related in effort and purpose and in which solutions are sought and worked out collectively" Not only were Cuban women united in solidarity with other Cuban women but with the women of the world. They invited representatives of other countries and allowed them to participate. There were women from Chile, Costa Rica and a Soviet cosmonaut.

== Challenges and achievements ==
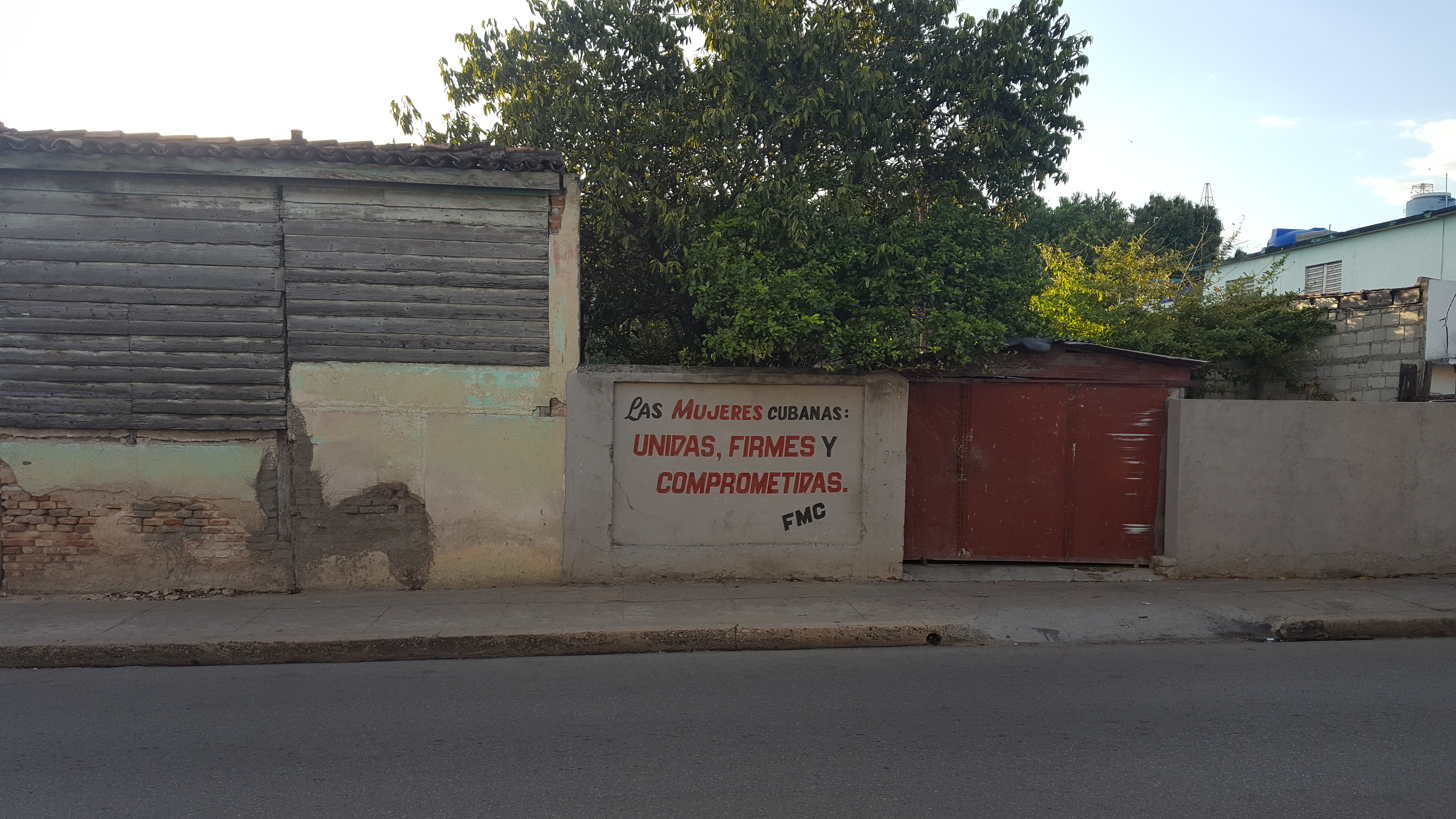
Promotional mural of FMC in Cienfuegos. It reads: "Cuban women: United, firm and committed."

Historically speaking, the FMC has come up against a variety of challenges including but not limited to international affairs, economic constraints, and advancing political policies. Despite various adversities, the FMC has still succeeded and reached impactful milestones. Noteworthy challenges and achievements are as follows:

Economic hardships. Since its 1960 inception the FMC has been challenged in its efforts to efficiently execute programs because of the economic difficulties it constantly faces. Cuba's economic environment noted by austerity intervals and the further threatening external pressures posed hurdle after hurdle for the organization. The FMC has had to be resilient and prompt in addressing economics that are hindering women's succession in education, employment, and socially.

Further building on the challenge of international pressures; the FMC has had to answer to external scrutiny which is negatively impacting their advocacy efforts and thus making diplomatic finesse necessary. Per contra, the FMC's constant and mass advocation via the global stage has strengthened Cuba's international reputation, cementing gender equality as a grand concern.

In terms of the constantly changing nature of Cuba's policies; this has resulted in both advantages and disadvantages experienced by the FMC. Historically, as political ideologies have shifted and evolved the FMC has necessitated adaptability amongst the many strengths of the country's politics. By utilizing influence to direct policies women's empowerment and the advocation of gender equality the FMC has been proactive about responding to this instability. The FMC's ability to handle these transformations reveals the impactful position it possesses within Cuba's socio-political environment.

In the face of these challenges, the FMC has still produced notable success in advocating for women's rights. A significant achievement stands in the constitutional assurance of equal rights for women across economic, political, cultural, social, and familial domains. Additionally, the FMC is responsible for enacting instrumental measures in legislative adjustments that have resulted in the beneficial influence in the lives of women, and thus promoting empowerment and inclusiveness in the countries culture.

Its clear that the FMC has advanced gender equity, with its reinforcing accomplishment in 2015 where women held about half of the Cuban National Assembly parliamentary seats.The FMC's efforts have not been confined to the political realm; they have also shaped education, healthcare, and workforce policies, fostering an atmosphere conducive to achieving gender parity. Despite absences in high-level administrative government roles, the organization continues to strive for greater representation. Its ongoing efforts signal a commitment to breaking down barriers and fostering a more equitable society for Cuban women.

== Bibliography ==
- Harris, Colette, "Socialist Societies and the Emancipation of Women: The Case of Cuba." Socialism and Democracy 9:1(1995)91-113. Print.
- McCall, Cecelia, "Women and Literacy: The Cuban Experience" Journal of Reading 30:4(Jan.1987)318-324. Print.
- Randall, Margaret, "We Need a Government of Men And Women…!" Latin American Perspectives 2:4(1975)111-117. Print.
- Ramírez Chicharro, Manuel (2018-07-29). "Beyond suffrage: the role of Cuban women in the state-building years of a failed democracy (1940–1952)". Women's History Review. 27 (5): 754–777. doi:10.1080/09612025.2017.1359875. ISSN 0961-2025. S2CID 219609567.
- Chicharro, Manuel Ramírez (April 2022). "Radicalizing Feminism: The Mexican and Cuban Associations within the Women's International Democratic Federation in the Early Cold War". International Review of Social History. 67 (S30): 75–102. doi:10.1017/S0020859022000025. ISSN 0020-8590. S2CID 247325880.
- Grunig, Larissa A. (1993). The Cuban Women's Federation: Organization of a Feminist Revolution. Women in International Development, Michigan State University.
- Riess, Barbara (2011). "Counting Women, Women Who Count: Measures of the Revolution within the Revolution". Cuban Studies. 42 (1): 115–135. doi:10.1353/cub.2011.0018. ISSN 1548-2464. S2CID 143487016.
- Gender equality plans in Latin America and the Caribbean – Road maps for development. United Nations. 2019. pp. 6–24, 30–33, 51–60. ISBN 9789211219425.
- Johnson, Candace (2011). "Framing for Change: Social Policy, the State, and the Federación de Mujeres Cubanas". Cuban Studies. 42: 35–51. ISSN 0361-4441. JSTOR 24487499.
- "Country Fact Sheet | UN Women Data Hub". data.unwomen.org.
- Triplett, Jen (February 2022). "Articulating the Pueblo Cubano : Women's Politicization and Productivity in Revolutionary Cuba, 1959 to 1969". American Sociological Review. 87 (1): 80–104. doi:10.1177/00031224211060836. ISSN 0003-1224. S2CID 245397796.
- "United States Strategy on Global Women's Economic Security". United States Department of State.
- Cuba Questionnaire to Governments on implementation of the Beijing platform for action (1995) and the outcome of the twenty-third special session of the general assembly., www.un.org/womenwatch/daw/Review/responses/Cuba-English.pdf.
- UN Women Strategic Plan, www.unwomen.org/sites/default/files/Headquarters/Attachments/Sections/Library/Publications/2021/UN-Women-Strategic-Plan-2022-2025-brochure-en.pdf. Accessed 2 Dec. 2023.
