= Peter Woods =

Peter Woods may refer to:

- Pete Woods, American comic book artist
- Peter Woods (American football) (born 2005), American football player
- Peter Woods (footballer) (born 1950), English footballer
- Peter Woods (journalist) (1930–1995), British journalist, reporter and newsreader
- Peter Cavanaugh Woods (1819–1898), Confederate cavalry officer
- Peter Woods, guitarist in the band Romeo Void

== See also ==
- Peter Wood (disambiguation)
