= Bertie McGonigal =

Northern Irish footballer

Personal information
- Full name: Robert Edwin McGonigal
- Date of birth: 2 May 1942
- Place of birth: Cookstown, Northern Ireland
- Date of death: 12 September 2014 (aged 72)
- Height: 6 ft 0 in (1.83 m)
- Position: Goalkeeper

Youth career
- 19??–1958: Chimney Corner

Senior career*
Years	Team	Apps	(Gls)
1958-1962	Glentoran		
1962–1966	Brighton & Hove Albion	57	(0)
1966–196?	Cape Town City		
1967–1972	Linfield		
1972–1974	Ballyclare Comrades		
1974–197?	Distillery		

International career
1956–1957	Northern Ireland schoolboys		
1959	Northern Ireland youth	1	(0)
- * Club domestic league appearances and goals

Robert Edwin McGonigal (2 May 1942 – 12 September 2014), known as Bert or Bertie McGonigal, was a Northern Irish professional footballer who made 57 appearances in the English Football League playing as a goalkeeper for Brighton & Hove Albion. He also played domestically for Glentoran, Linfield, whom he represented in the European Cup and UEFA Cup, Ballyclare Comrades and Distillery, as well as in South Africa for Cape Town City. He represented his country at schoolboy and youth level, and played for the Irish League representative team.

== Life and career ==
McGonigal was born in 1942 in Cookstown, Northern Ireland. He represented his country at schoolboy and youth level, and played for Chimney Corner before signing for Irish League club Glentoran in 1959. Playing part-time and working as a joiner, he made 102 appearances in all competitions, and was Glentoran's goalkeeper as they won the 1960–61 Gold Cup. In February 1962, he moved on to Brighton & Hove Albion of the English Second Division, where he was a first-team regular until December 1963 when a serious injury gave Brian Powney his chance. McGonigal acted as backup to Powney after his recovery, but played little, and was released after four years with the club.

He spent time with South African club Cape Town City before returning to Northern Ireland to join Linfield. He made more than 200 appearances, including 4 each in the UEFA Cup and European Cup. He was in goal in the 1967–68 Irish Cup final, which Linfield lost 2–0 to Crusaders, and was part of the team that won the league title the following season. While a Linfield player, he played for the Irish League representative team in matches against their English and Republic of Ireland counterparts. He moved on to Ballyclare Comrades as trainer and player in 1972, and made a brief return to senior football with Distillery two years later.

McGonigal died in 2014 at the age of 72.
