= John Templeman =

English footballer (born 1947)

Personal information
- Full name: John Henry Templeman
- Date of birth: 21 September 1947 (age 79)
- Place of birth: Yapton, England
- Height: 5 ft 11 in (1.80 m)
- Positions: Full back; midfielder

Youth career
- 196?–1965: Portsmouth
- 1965–1966: Brighton & Hove Albion

Senior career*
Years	Team	Apps	(Gls)
- Arundel Town
1966–1974	Brighton & Hove Albion	226	(16)
1974–1979	Exeter City	206	(7)
1979–1980	Swindon Town	21	(0)
1980–19??	Witney Town		

Managerial career
- 198?–1988: Arundel
- * Club domestic league appearances and goals

John Henry Templeman (born 21 September 1947) is an English former professional footballer who made 453 Football League appearances playing as a full back or midfielder, including more than 200 each for Brighton & Hove Albion and Exeter City.

== Life and career ==
Templeman was born in Yapton, West Sussex, and began his football career with Arundel Town before joining Portsmouth's youth system. However, the Portsmouth club axed its junior teams in 1965, and Templeman moved on to Brighton & Hove Albion. He turned professional in July 1966 and made his first-team debut in December, charged with man-marking the country's top scorer, Rodney Marsh of Queens Park Rangers. He continued in the team for several years, and on the final day of the 1971–72 season, scored a 25-yard (23 m) goal that earned Brighton the point they needed to secure promotion to the Second Division.

Templeman had taken his totals to 18 goals from 255 senior appearances by the end of the 1973–74 season, when Brian Clough used him and Lammie Robertson – against the wishes of both – as makeweights in the deal that brought Fred Binney from Exeter City to Brighton. He was a regular for five years with Exeter, and was a member of the squad that gained promotion from the Fourth Division in 1976–77. He made 206 league appearances before finishing his Football League career with a season at Swindon Town. He then played Southern League football for Witney Town while managing a sports centre, coached abroad, returned to England to manage Arundel, and worked in insurance and as a taxi driver. In July 2021, he was still living in West Sussex and held a season ticket at Brighton & Hove Albion.
