= Peter Wood =

Peter Wood may refer to:

- Peter Atte Wode (fl. c. 1325–1382), English justice
- Pete Wood (1867–1923), Canadian-American Major League Baseball pitcher
- Peter Wood (director) (1925–2016), English theatre director
- Peter Hill-Wood (1936–2018), English businessman
- Sir Peter Wood (businessman) (born 1946), founder of insurance companies Direct Line and Esure
- Peter Wood, Australian businessman and founding partner G. Wood, Son & Co.
- Peter H. Wood (born 1943), American historian and author
- Peter K. Wood (born 1984), American entertainer and magician
- Peter Wood (Australian politician) (1935–2010), member of the Queensland Legislative Assembly
- Peter Wood (American politician), Maine state representative
- Peter Wood (footballer, born 1946), Australian rules football player for Fitzroy
- Peter Wood (footballer, born 1939), Australian rules football player for Footscray
- Peter Wood (cricketer) (1951–2022), English cricketer
- Peter W. Wood, American anthropologist; president of the National Association of Scholars
- Peter Wood (1950–1993), British musician, member of Quiver
- Peter Wood, 3rd Earl of Halifax (born 1944), British peer and Conservative politician

== See also ==
- "Peter's Got Woods", Family Guy episode
- Peter Woods (disambiguation)
- Peter Van Wood (1927–2010), Dutch guitarist, singer, songwriter, actor and astrologer
