= María Villar Buceta =

Cuban poet, journalist and activist

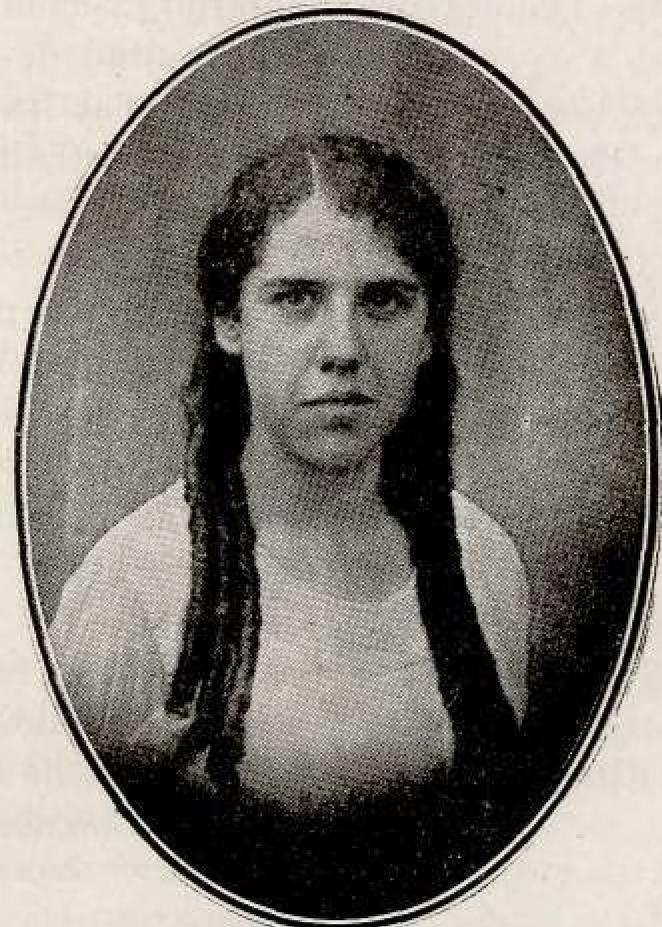
- Born: María del Carmen Villar Buceta; 25 April 1899; Corral Falso de Macuriges, Cuba
- Died: 29 June 1977 (aged 78); Havana, Cuba
- Occupations: Poet, journalist, librarian
- Relatives: Aurora Villar Buceta (sister)

María del Carmen Villar Buceta (25 April 1899 – 29 June 1977) was a Cuban poet, journalist, and activist associated with the avant-garde movement of the 1920s and 1930s. She was best known for her 1927 poetry collection Unanimismo.

She was also a pioneer of library science in Cuba, and became the country's first teacher in the subject.

== Biography ==
María Villar Buceta was born in Corral Falso de Macuriges on 25 April 1899, the daughter of Froilán Villar González and Petra Buceta. She was the sister of the short story writer Aurora Villar Buceta, with whom she opposed the dictatorship of Gerardo Machado.

She made her writing debut in 1915 when she published the sonnet "Desilusión" in the Diario de La Marina. Of her work as a poet, the 1927 collection Unanimismo (Unanimism) had the greatest impact, being described as "one of the most important works during the first third of the 20th century." In addition, she wrote for several periodicals, including El Heraldo de Cuba and La Noche – where she was an editor - and the magazines El Fígaro, Castalia, and Social.

She began working at the National Library in 1924. She and director Francisco de Paula Coronado catalogued and classified its collection, and moved it to another location when the library was evicted from its building in 1929. She was fired after the fall of Machado's government in 1933, and moved to the Municipal Library of Havana. She went on to found and direct several other libraries, and became the country's first library science teacher in 1936.

Villar Buceta participated in the Grupo Minorista, a cultural organization promoting the avant-garde in Cuba. It published a manifesto on 6 May 1927, of which she and Mariblanca Sabas Alomá were the only women signatories. Additionally, she was one of the founders of the Gorki group.

Among her most original, although little anthologized, poems is "Autorretro", which, according to Milena Rodríguez's Anthology of 19th and 20th Century Cuban Poets, expresses a feminist attitude that can be read in the ironic contrast established between the "between-nullity" and the "entity-initiative".

María Villar Buceta died in Havana on 29 June 1977. In his farewell dedication, poet Ángel Augier described her as "an exceptional woman, a distinguished writer, and an exemplary revolutionary".
