= Matilde Rodríguez Cabo =

Matilde Rodríguez Cabon
- Born: July 17, 1902; San Luis Potosí, Mexico
- Died: September 8, 1967 (aged 65); Mexico City, Mexico
- Education: National Autonomous University of Mexico; Humboldt University of Berlin
- Occupations: Psychiatrist, Social Activist
- Spouse: Francisco J. Múgica

Matilde Rodríguez Cabo Guzmán (Las Palmas, San Luis Potosí, July 17, 1902 – Mexico City, September 8, 1967,) was Mexico's first female psychiatrist. Also a surgeon, writer, feminist, and suffragist, Rodríguez was an activist for the right of Mexican women, and affiliated with the Mexican Communist Party. She was married to General Francisco J. Múgica; they had a son, Janitzio Múgica Rodríguez Cabo.

Matilde graduated in 1929 from the faculty of medicine at the National Autonomous University of Mexico, and specialized in psychiatry at the Humboldt University of Berlin between 1929 and 1930. With Esther Chapa and María Lavalle Urbina, Rodríguez pioneered the Mexican feminist movement of the 1940s. In this context, the movement was spearheaded by the group of women and intellectuals associated with various organizations in the country, including the Frente Único Pro Derechos de la Mujer (FUPDN), whose membership included Chapa, Refugio Garcia, Esperanza Balmaceda, and Consuelo Uranga. In 1933, she founded the first school for people with learning disabilities. In 1936, along with Ofelia Domínguez Navarro, Rodríguez proposed reforms to decriminalize abortion in Mexico through the presentation La Mujer y la Revolución in the Frente Socialista de Abogados. The proposal was at the forefront of the international debate on women's self-determination. She was also a notable researcher, as well as an advocate of eugenics and the right to abortion.

== Early life ==
In 1902, Matilde Rodríguez was born in the Mexican city of Las Palmas, San Luis Potosí. Although part of her childhood took place amidst the Mexican revolutionary war, at fourteen, Rodríguez attended the German school in Mexico, Colegio Alemán Alexander von Humboldt (Mexico City), acquiring her baccalaureate and the language of German while she was there. She would later use the skill of German during her studies in the country of Germany and to translate major German psychiatric works of Carl Jung, Sigmund Freud, and Oskar Pfister into Spanish.

== Psychiatric Training ==
Rodríguez started her first term of medical school at the National University of Mexico in 1922, and in the application process, she attempted to enter with the career of surgeon, but was faced by opposition by the university which had the traditional views for females for this time, and only with letters of support was she able to attend as a regular student. In 1928, Rodríguez graduated as a surgeon, with tonicity and gastronomy covered in her thesis, although psychiatry would soon be the field she pursued. In 1929, Rodríguez was awarded the Alexander von Humboldt Society scholarship from the University of Berlin, which allowed her to specialize her medical knowledge in neurology and psychiatry at Cursos Internacionales de Perfeccionamiento Médico in Germany. In 1929, she was also appointed president of the Supreme Court of Social Prevention in Mexico and a member of the Supreme Council of Defense and Social Welfare. During her studies in Germany, under commission by the Mexican government, Rodríguez spent time with the Soviet Union and the Stalinist SSRU to learn more about their practices of mother and child protection, which in turn, first introduced her to the socialism and its movement. After her return to Mexico, Rodríguez joined with José Gómez Robleda and Samuel Ramírez Moreno at the General Penitentiary of La Castañeda to begin incorporating these new methods of psychiatric care-taking to those working at this general asylum.

== Personal and Later life ==
Matilde Rodríguez Cabo would go on to represent and circulate Mexico's viewpoints in international conferences, particularly in regards to the treatment of women and children, which was the major area of her expertise and life's work. In For example, in September 1931, Matilde gave a public speech in from a congress of workers and the poor emphasizing the importance of age when dealing with trauma. At 28 years of age from March 1931 to March 1934, Matilde served as the head of Clinic of Psychiatry at the very medical school she attended. In 1936, Dr. Matilde Rodríguez Cabo was appointed head of the Social Security Department of the Ministry of the Interior. Matilde went on to work with numerous public institutions in Mexico, such as the National School of Social Work, and as an Inspector of the General Directorate of Incorporation and Revalidation of Studies of the National Autonomous University of Mexico, where she worked on producing law projects that strived towards making a more equal and just society for women and children in Mexico. In February 1940, Matilde presented her work towards the hindrance of the problem surrounding delinquent minors and prostitution of children at the time in a series of conferences for the Department of Social Prevention organized by the Mexican Eugenic Society for the Improvement of Race.

== The Children’s Pavilion of “La Castañeda ==
The General Mental Hospital of La Castañeda established the Children's Pavilion in October 1932, in order to rebuild the integrity the twentieth century Mexican institution and to create a place for protecting and treating the health of children, and Rodríguez was appointed its Mental Hospital director within the same year. She held the title of the Head of Child Psychiatry Service of the General Asylum of Mexico. In February 1933, Matilde inaugurated an attachment to the Children's pavilion, the School for Abnormal Children and well as the start of musical, gymnastic, and alternate hobby and work-therapy programs for children within the institution. Under her direction, institution was reformed, with the incorporation of increased organization, improved services, conditions, and attention to the children, and a more economical approach overall by removing unnecessary expenses and faculty. She created a curriculum and workshops that included instruction on the culture, procedures, evaluations, and budget to be implemented within the institution. Rodríguez also enhanced the treatment of the mentally ill by including a more circumstantial clinical approach for patients rather than only generalized diagnoses, and facilitation and training for individuals reintegrating to society. By 1937, La Castaneda's Department of Child Psychiatry had the attendance of 38 girls and 51 boys with varied diagnoses and treatments.

== Treatment and Therapy for “Abnormal Children” in Mexico ==
Matilde served as an advocate for improving problems with in social rehabilitation centers, which at the time did not properly aim to rehabilitate mentally ill children into society as useful individuals or in a timely manner. Furthermore, she believed that a major component of this process was intentional attention, care, and study of each patient's psychosis and physiology to properly diagnose and treat each individual. In post-revolutionary Mexico, she helped popularize the concept that a child's mental illness could possible stem from conditions of their exposed environment or economic circumstance, and not just their biological genetics.

== The Fight or the Rights of Women ==
Outside of her psychiatric practice, Matilde Rodríguez Cabo was highly politically and socially active, particularly in regards to the fight for the rights of women in Mexico. Under the presidency of General Lazaro Cardenas, a wave of feminism was mobilized and on August 28, 1935, Matilde Rodríguez Cabo joined women of the Mexican Communist Party and the National Revolutionary Party in creating a united congress for women's rights in Mexico in the Single Front for the Defense of Women's Rights (FUPDM).

Matilde tackled a wide range of social issues in regards to women and their rights. A major criticism she had were with laws she believed did not defend the rights of single mothers and children born out of wedlock, and stated that a restructure in the interactions and treatment of these individuals, who often were required a paternity investigation, was needed, especially among class differences. Matilde pushed for awareness of mothers and children in Mexico at this time that often faced major health issues that were left unaddressed.

Matilde Rodríguez Cabo also led the way in Mexico's legalization of abortion. From 1920 to 1940, abortion legalization was a major point of discussion within the country, and Matilde expressed the eugenic notion that abortion could be used as racial advancement, with mothers being given the ability to choose their genetic legacy and the decrease the number of births from women with mentally unstable or insane backgrounds. For these reasons, Matilde pushed for the label of infanticide to be removed from abortion. In 1937, with other feminist Marxists of the time such as Esther Chapa, Ofelia Domínguez Navarro, and Esperanza Balmaceda, Matilde presented a proposal to the Socialist Front of Lawyers to withdraw abortion as a criminal offense and to move forward in granting women full civil and political rights.

Matilde also place a high level of importance on the professional, social, and political roles of women in the country of Mexico. She had close ties with many well-known individuals in not only medicine, but also those in politics, law, and literature. Her opinions on these issues would later lead to the writings that contributed to her published works: “La mujer y la Revolución” and “El problema sexual de las menores mujeres y su repercusión en la delincuencia juvenil femenina”.

== Personal works ==
- Estudios sobre delincuencia e infancia abandonada (1931)
- La mujer y la Revolución (1937)
- El problema sexual de las menores mujeres y su repercusión en la delincuencia juvenil femenina (1940)
