= Esther Chapa =

Mexican medical surgeon, writer, feminist, suffragist, trade unionist, and activist

- Born: 22 October 1904; Tamaulipas, Mexico
- Died: 14 December 1970 (aged 66); Mexico City, Mexico
- Occupations: Physician, Writer, Educator

Esther Chapa Tijerina (22 October 1904 – 14 December 1970) was a Mexican medical surgeon, educator, writer, feminist, suffragist, trade unionist, and women's and children's rights activist. In her medical practice she specialized in clinical analysis and microbiology, and she taught microbiology at the National Autonomous University of Mexico.

== Early life ==
Esther Chapa was born on October 22, 1904, in Tamaulipas to Virginia Tijerina and Quirino Chapa. She had four siblings.

== Career ==
Chapa taught microbiology at the National Autonomous University of Mexico.

She served as president of the National School of Nursing and co-founded the surgeon’s union and union of service workers.

== Women's suffrage ==
Chapa was a member of the Single Front Pro-Women's Rights (FUPDM) together with Dr. Matilde Rodriguez Cabo. Drs. Chapa and Cabo became acquainted with one another while in medical school and created reforms to assist in prisons, prostitution, and welfare for women and children. Cabo and Chapa together created the Frente Unico (Single Front in Mexico) in 1935. In order to investigate the issues mentioned, Chapa and a few other women created the "Leona Vicarío" for the study of the particular issues of Mexican families and the "status of a woman as mother and wife".

At a June 1934 meeting, Marxist dissidents, such as Chapa, argued that poverty was a large reason for the prevalence of prostitution in the area. Prostitution was regulated at the time and became a large sum of government official's salary. Chapa pushed for a Marxist revolution to stop the regulation of prostitution and use government funds for education and social reforms instead. She was also active on behalf of abortion rights, equality, and the right to vote and be an active political member of society. She believed that women were more level-headed than men and can bring new perspectives into the field. Her view was less maternalistic than other women in the group. Many countries had already granted women’s rights to their people. However, Chapa insisted on following the Soviet Union’s method: women are to enjoy their equality with men rather than having men grant their equality through legislation.

Chapa's 1936 book El derecho al voto para la mujer compared women to prisoners and patients in insane asylums, as they too were not allowed to vote and were restricted in the activities they could do.

== Other activities ==
Chapa worked to create a Women’s Prison through the Social Prevention in the Federal Penitentiary. She was also director of the Help Committee for the Children of the Spanish People (for refugees of the Spanish Civil War).

After the Frente Unico gained their victory in granting women equal rights in 1958, Chapa became an international consultant and made frequent trips to China to foster relations between the countries of China and Mexico.

Chapa died of cancer in December 1970.

== Selected works ==
- El derecho de voto para la mujer. Frente Único Pro Derechos de la Mujer. 1936.
- Las mujeres mexicanas (with Miguel Alemán) (1945)
- La mujer en la política en el próximo sexenio (1946)
- El problema de la penitenciaría del Distrito Federal (1947)
- Apuntes de prácticas de microbiología (with Pedro Pérez Grovas) (1941)
