= Paul Fuschillo =

English footballer (born 1948)

Personal information
- Full name: Paul Michael Fuschillo
- Date of birth: 20 October 1948 (age 78)
- Place of birth: Islington, England
- Position: Full back

Youth career
- Arsenal
- Oxford University

Senior career*
| Years | Team | Apps | (Gls) |
| 1970–1971 | Wycombe Wanderers | 19 | (0) |
| 1971–1974 | Blackpool | 11 | (0) |
| 1974 | Brighton & Hove Albion | 17 | (1) |
| Total | | 47 | (1) |

International career
- Great Britain
- * Club domestic league appearances and goals

Paul Michael Fuschillo (born 20 October 1948) was an English amateur footballer who played as a full back.

== Career ==
Born in Islington, after playing for Arsenal and Oxford University, Fuschillo played non-league football for Wycombe Wanderers; he also made 28 appearances in the Football League for Blackpool and Brighton & Hove Albion.

Fuschillo was also a member of the British national side which failed to qualify for the 1972 Summer Olympics.
