= Ronnie Welch =

English footballer

Personal information
- Full name: Ronald Welch
- Date of birth: 26 September 1952 (age 74)
- Place of birth: Chesterfield, England
- Position: Midfielder

Senior career*
Years	Team	Apps	(Gls)
1969–1973	Burnley	1	(0)
1973–1974	Brighton & Hove Albion	36	(4)
1974–1977	Chesterfield	24	(1)
Total		61	(5)
- * Club domestic league appearances and goals

Ronald Welch (born 26 September 1952) is an English former professional footballer who played as a midfielder.
