= Ofelia Domínguez Navarro =

Cuban writer, teacher, lawyer, feminist and activist

Ofelia Domínguez Navarro (Mataguá, December 9, 1894 – Havana, July 7, 1976) was a Cuban writer, teacher, lawyer, feminist and activist. She was a proponent of the rights of women and illegitimate children. As a journalist, Domínguez Navarro supported feminist views while writing for various media in Cuba, and in 1935, became the first woman newspaper director in the country with La Palabra. She was noted as one of the leading intellectuals of the decades of 1930 and 1940, with Mirta Aguirre and Mariblanca Sabas Aloma.

== Biography ==
The daughter of Florentino Dominguez and Paula Navarro, she was born into a family with revolutionary ideals who were participant activists. Her mother died when she was just fourteen years old, and the care of her younger siblings fell on her. However, she was able to still graduate from high school. She graduated from university in 1918 with a Bachelor of Science, followed by a degree in Civil law from the University of Havana in 1921. After graduating from law school, she began her long professional career in women's work. She was a criminal defense lawyer and focused on defending prostitutes and other impoverished women. She belonged to the group of women and intellectuals who founded the Club Femenino de Cuba, of which she became a delegate to First National Congress of Women in Cuba in 1923. At the conference, she spoke passionately about the rights of illegitimate children and argued for the necessity of paternity testing. Dominguez also spoke in 1926 at the Panama Congress, where she encouraged the formation of a broader Pan-American feminist movement. She was also founder of the Alianza Nacional Feminista (National Feminist Alliance).

In 1924, Domínguez Navarro founded the magazine Villaclara and served as its director. Her articles were published in several other newspapers, such La Prensa, El Mundo, El Cubano Libre and El País, in addition to writing for the feminist magazine, Bohemia y Carteles. In Mexico, she wrote in the Nacional and El Universal, among others.

Politically, Domínguez Navarro participated in the movement against the dictatorship of Gerardo Machado, for which she was imprisoned and exiled to Mexico. In 1936, along with Matilde Rodríguez Cabo, she first proposed reforms designed to decriminalize abortion in Mexico's Penal Code, a proposal that was at the forefront of the international debate looming on the self-determination of women.

== Selected works ==
- El aborto por causas sociales y económicas (1936)
- 50 años de una vida (1971)
