= Mick Brown (footballer) =

English football player and manager (born 1939)

Personal information
- Full name: Michael John Brown
- Date of birth: 11 July 1939 (age 87)
- Place of birth: Walsall, England
- Position: Full-back

Team information
- Current team: Aston Villa (scout)

Senior career*
Years	Team	Apps	(Gls)
1958–1967	Hull City	8	(0)
1967–1968	Lincoln City	39	(0)
1968–1969	Cambridge City	20	(1)

Managerial career
- 1975–1979: Oxford United
- 1979–1981: West Bromwich Albion (assistant)
- 1981–1986: Manchester United (assistant)
- 1987–1992: Bolton Wanderers (assistant)
- * Club domestic league appearances and goals

Michael John Brown (born 11 July 1939) is an English retired football player and coach.

== Career ==
Brown was born in Walsall. A full-back, he began his career as a for Hull City, before moving on to Lincoln City. Soon after, Brown moved on to Cambridge City.

Soon after, he was offered a full-time coaching position at Oxford United. After six years as a coach, and following the departure of Gerry Summers to Gillingham, Brown was offered the manager's job at Oxford, a position he held for a further four years. Despite having limited success with the Us, Brown impressed enough to be offered a job at West Bromwich Albion as Ron Atkinson's assistant. When Atkinson was signed by Manchester United in 1981, he was followed by Brown soon after. The two had a successful spell together at Old Trafford, winning two FA Cups in 1983 and 1985, as well as reaching the final of the League Cup in 1983. In addition, the team never finished below fourth in the league in Brown's time there.

However, in November 1986, Atkinson was dismissed by United. His replacement, Alex Ferguson, brought his own assistant manager with him, and Brown was no longer required at the club. In 1989, he was signed by Phil Neal as his assistant at Bolton Wanderers. He remained at Bolton for a further three years, until Neal lost his job with the Trotters and Brown followed him out of the exit door. That summer, he took up a coaching post in Pahang, Malaysia, with the Pahang FA.

Brown did not stay in Malaysia for very long, and soon returned to England as Coventry City's chief scout. He then took up a similar position at Blackburn Rovers in 1997, but only stayed for one season before moving back to Manchester United as Chief Scout. He stayed at United for eight years, before he was forcibly retired by the club, whose policy at the time required all staff over the age of 65 to retire. West Brom re-signed Brown in the summer of 2005, and he stayed there for almost two years before linking up with the former Manchester United captain, Roy Keane, at Sunderland, joining fellow United old-boys Neil Bailey, Raimond van der Gouw and Michael Clegg.

Sporting positions
Preceded by Tommy Cavanagh	Manchester United F.C. assistant manager 1981–1986	Succeeded by Archie Knox
