= Ian Goodwin =

English footballer

Personal information
- Full name: Ian David Goodwin
- Date of birth: 14 November 1950 (age 75)
- Place of birth: Irlam, England
- Position: Central defender

Youth career
- Oldham Athletic

Senior career*
Years	Team	Apps	(Gls)
1968–1970	Coventry City	4	(0)
1970–1974	Brighton & Hove Albion	56	(0)
1974–19??	Nuneaton Borough		
- * Club domestic league appearances and goals

Ian David Goodwin (born 14 November 1950) is an English former professional footballer who made 60 appearances in the Football League playing as a central defender for Coventry City and Brighton & Hove Albion. He was on the books of Oldham Athletic without playing for them in the league, and went on to play for Southern League club Nuneaton Borough. He later coached at Nuneaton Borough and worked in sales and management for motor manufacturers.
