= Steve Piper =

English footballer

Personal information
- Full name: Steve Piper
- Date of birth: 2 November 1953
- Place of birth: Brighton, East Sussex
- Date of death: 26 December 2017 (aged 64)
- Place of death: Brighton, East Sussex
- Position: Central defender

Youth career
- Brighton & Hove Albion

Senior career*
Years	Team	Apps	(Gls)
1972–1977	Brighton & Hove Albion	162	(9)
1977–1979	Portsmouth	29	(2)
- Worthing
- Whitehawk
- * Club domestic league appearances and goals

Steve Piper (2 November 1953 – 26 December 2017) was an English footballer who played as a central defender.

Born in Brighton, Piper joined Brighton and Hove Albion as a youth player and went on to make 162 league appearances for the Seagulls. He then moved on to Portsmouth before joining non-league Worthing. He also played for Littlehampton Town, Southwick, Steyning Town and Whitehawk.

Piper died on 26 December 2017 aged 64.
