= Mike Bamber =

Businessman and football executive

- Born: Mike Bamber; 16 October 1930
- Died: 11 July 1988 (aged 57); Jersey
- Occupations: Property developer, Chairman of Brighton & Hove Albion F.C. (1972–1984)
- Spouse: Jean
- Children: 3

Mike Bamber (16 October 1930 – 11 July 1988) was a British businessman and football executive. He was chairman of Brighton & Hove Albion for a period of more than ten years during the 1970s and 1980s during which time he oversaw the football club's promotion to the First Division of English football for the first time.

Mike Bamber was a musician and then a property developer before becoming chairman of Brighton & Hove Albion.

== Brighton & Hove Albion ==
Bamber joined the board of Brighton & Hove Albion in 1970 and became joint chairman during the Christmas of 1972.

Alongside vice-chairman Harry Bloom, Bamber negotiated the appointment of Brian Clough as manager in November 1973. Clough would later describe Bamber as "a wealthy, night-club-owning, gem of a man, who turned out to be the nicest and best chairman I ever worked for," and "If he was alive today and I was tempted to come out of retirement, Mike's would be the offer I would take" and of his decision to leave Brighton for Leeds United after less than one year with the club he said, "I know it broke Mike Bamber's heart." Bamber is portrayed briefly, by Paul Bown, in the 2009 movie The Damned United, shown meeting Clough and Peter Taylor in the lounge of a Brighton seafront hotel to negotiate terms.

Bamber later appointed Alan Mullery, who led the football club to the First Division in the 1978/79 season. He also appointed Jimmy Melia as Manager who led the club to their one and only FA Cup Final in 1983. The club lost that final and were relegated to the Second Division in the same season. Bamber left the board a year later, in the summer of 1984, when he was replaced as chairman by Bryan Bedson.

== Death ==
Bamber died at his home in Jersey on 11 July 1988, at the age of 57.

Commenting on Bamber's death in August 1988, Brighton's then chairman Dudley Sizen said, "Mike was the most successful chairman we've ever had and the club enjoyed its finest hours under his leadership."
