= Ken Goodeve =

English footballer

Personal information
- Full name: Kenneth George Alfred Goodeve
- Date of birth: 3 September 1950 (age 76)
- Place of birth: Manchester, England
- Height: 5 ft 10 in (1.78 m)
- Position: Defender

Youth career
- 1965–1967: Manchester United

Senior career*
Years	Team	Apps	(Gls)
1967–1970	Manchester United	0	(0)
1970–1973	Luton Town	15	(0)
1973–1974	Brighton & Hove Albion	6	(0)
1974–1976	Watford	67	(4)
1977	Wootton Blue Cross		
1977–1982	Bedford Town		
1982	Hitchin Town		(1)
1982–1983	Kidderminster Harriers		
1983–1984	Buckingham Town		
1984–1985	Barton Rovers		
1986–1987	Kempston Rovers		
1990–1997	Wootton Blue Cross		

Managerial career
- 1993–1997: Wootton Blue Cross (player-manager)
- * Club domestic league appearances and goals

Kenneth George Alfred Goodeve (born 3 September 1950) is an English former professional footballer who played as a defender in the Football League for Luton Town, Brighton & Hove Albion and Watford. He began his career with Manchester United but never played for the first team, and spent many years in non-league football.

== Life and career ==
Goodeve was born in 1950 in Manchester. He joined Manchester United as a schoolboy in 1965 and turned professional two years later, but despite captaining their youth team, he did not progress to the first team. In April 1970, Goodeve joined Second Division club Luton Town as part of a £35,000 deal that also took Don Givens, Jimmy Ryan and Peter Woods to the club. He made only 15 league appearances in a three-and-a-half-year stay before Brian Clough paid a £20,000 fee in December 1973 to strengthen a struggling Brighton & Hove Albion team. He did not impress, and left for another Third Division club, Watford, for £10,000, where he found regular first-team football. He was ever-present in all competitions in the 1974–75 season, which finished with relegation, and extended the run to 69 consecutive matches before a groin injury put an end to his career in the Football League.

After making a return to the game with Wootton Blue Cross on a non-contract basis, Goodeve began five years with Southern League club Bedford Town. He made 251 appearances in all competitions, scored 21 goals, and only left when the club was on the brink of folding. He spent the first half of the 1982–83 season with Hitchin Town of the Isthmian League, scoring once from 25 matches in all competitions, and the second half back in the Southern League with Kidderminster Harriers. Short spells with Buckingham Town, Barton Rovers and Kempston Rovers preceded a return to Wootton Blue Cross in 1990, initially as a player, and from 1993 to 1997 as player-manager.

Outside football, Goodeve worked for a property development company.
