= Peter Woods (footballer) =

English footballer (born 1950)

Personal information
- Full name: Peter Anthony Woods
- Date of birth: 21 January 1950 (age 76)
- Place of birth: Sale, England
- Height: 5 ft 9 in (1.75 m)
- Positions: Midfielder; left back

Youth career
- 196?–1967: Manchester United

Senior career*
Years	Team	Apps	(Gls)
1967–1970	Manchester United	0	(0)
1970–1972	Luton Town	0	(0)
1972–1973	Southend United	26	(0)
1973–1975	Doncaster Rovers	49	(1)
- * Club domestic league appearances and goals

Peter Anthony Woods (born 21 January 1950) is an English former professional footballer who played as a midfielder or left back in the Football League for Southend United and Doncaster Rovers.

== Life and career ==
Woods was born in 1950 in Sale, which was then in Cheshire. He joined Manchester United from school, and turned professional in 1967, but had not played for the first team when, in April 1970, he joined Second Division club Luton Town as part of a £35,000 deal that also took Don Givens, Ken Goodeve and Jimmy Ryan to the club. He spent 18 months at Luton without making a first-team appearance, and joined Southend United in February 1972 for a £3000 fee. He played 27 matches before moving on to Doncaster Rovers in 1973, where he scored twice in 55 matches in a two-year spell.
