= Micky Conway =

English footballer

Personal information
- Full name: Michael Denis Conway
- Date of birth: 11 March 1956
- Place of birth: Sheffield, England
- Height: 5 ft 7 in (1.70 m)
- Position: Winger

Youth career
- 19??–1972: Westdene
- 1972–1973: Brighton & Hove Albion

Senior career*
Years	Team	Apps	(Gls)
1973–1975	Brighton & Hove Albion	2	(1)
1975–1978	Swansea City	61	(11)
- * Club domestic league appearances and goals

Michael Denis Conway (born 11 March 1956) is an English former professional footballer who played as a winger in the Football League for Brighton & Hove Albion and Swansea City.

== Career ==
Conway was born in 1956 in Sheffield. He began his football career as an apprentice with Brighton & Hove Albion in 1972, and made his senior debut in the last match of the 1972–73 Second Division season, at home to Nottingham Forest on 28 April 1973. At the age of 17 years, 48 days, he became the club's youngest league debutant – a record he held until 1987 when the 16-year-old Ian Chapman first appeared – and scored the equalising goal, albeit via a deflection. His club record as youngest goalscorer was only broken when Jake Robinson, also 16, scored in the Football League Trophy 40 years later. Later in 1973, he represented England Youth. Conway turned professional with Brighton in 1974, but played only once more for the team before joining Fourth Division club Swansea City in December 1975 for a £3,000 fee.

Conway soon established himself in the first team and, according to a profile on Swansea City's website, "became a favourite with his pace and sparkling control on the left wing." He was a member of the squad promoted from the Fourth Division in 1977–78, but was unable to enjoy playing at the higher level. He suffered serious injuries in a car crash, attempted a comeback against Barnsley in April 1978, and during the match was rushed to hospital with liver damage, believed to have been a consequence of the accident. That was his last professional appearance; he had scored 12 goals from 63 league appearances. In May 1979, Swansea faced the Brighton team newly promoted to the First Division in Conway's testimonial match.
