= Brian Bromley =

English footballer (1946-2012)

Personal information
- Date of birth: 20 March 1946
- Place of birth: Burnley, England
- Date of death: 9 March 2012 (aged 65)
- Place of death: Southampton, England
- Position: Midfielder

Senior career*
Years	Team	Apps	(Gls)
1963–1968	Bolton Wanderers	166	(25)
1968–1972	Portsmouth	89	(3)
1972–1974	Brighton & Hove Albion	50	(3)
1974–1975	Reading	14	(2)
1975	→ Darlington (loan)	3	(0)
1975–1976	Wigan Athletic	23	(1)
1976–1978	Waterlooville	??	(?)
- * Club domestic league appearances and goals

Brian Bromley (20 March 1946 – 9 March 2012) was an English footballer who played for Bolton Wanderers, Portsmouth, Brighton and Hove Albion, Reading and Darlington in the Football League and Wigan Athletic in the Northern Premier League.

== Career ==
Born in Burnley, Lancashire, Bromley started his career at Bolton Wanderers. He made his debut in March 1963 against Sheffield United, and made a total of 184 appearances in all competitions for the club, scoring 26 goals. In November 1968, he joined Portsmouth for a fee of £25,000.

In 1975, he joined Northern Premier League side Wigan Athletic, making 23 league appearances during his sole season at the club. In the following season, 1976/77, he joined Waterlooville in the Southern League Division 1 South, playing under former Portsmouth team-mate David Munks . He remained there for two seasons.
