= Lammie Robertson =

Scottish footballer (1947–2023)

Personal information
- Full name: Archibald Lamond Robertson
- Date of birth: 27 September 1947
- Place of birth: Paisley, Scotland
- Date of death: December 2023 (aged 76)
- Place of death: Macclesfield, England
- Position: Midfielder

Senior career*
Years	Team	Apps	(Gls)
1966–1968	Burnley	0	(0)
1968	Bury	5	(0)
1968–1973	Halifax Town	149	(20)
1973–1974	Brighton & Hove Albion	46	(8)
1974–1978	Exeter City	133	(25)
1976	→ Chicago Sting (loan)	14	(1)
1978	Leicester City	7	(0)
1978–1979	Peterborough United	15	(1)
1979–1980	Bradford City	43	(3)
- * Club domestic league appearances and goals

Archibald Lamond Robertson (27 September 1947 – December 2023) was a Scottish footballer, who played in the Football League for Burnley, Bury, Halifax Town, Brighton & Hove Albion, Exeter City, Leicester City, Peterborough United and Bradford City. He was born in Paisley.

His last Football League appearance was for Bradford City against Torquay United on 13 September 1980.

After his playing career finished, he became an independent financial advisor and scout for Sheffield United. He died of prostate cancer in Macclesfield, in December 2023, at the age of 76.
