= Brian Powney =

English footballer and manager

Personal information
- Full name: Brian William Powney
- Date of birth: 7 October 1944 (age 82)
- Place of birth: Seaford, England
- Height: 5 ft 9 in (1.75 m)
- Position: Goalkeeper

Youth career
- 19??–1960: Eastbourne United
- 1960–1961: Brighton & Hove Albion

Senior career*
Years	Team	Apps	(Gls)
1961–1974	Brighton & Hove Albion	351	(0)
1974–197?	Southwick		
- Bexhill Town
- Eastbourne United
1980–198?	Peacehaven & Telscombe		

Managerial career
- 1974–197?: Southwick
- 1976–19??: Newhaven
- 1987–1991: Seaford Town
- * Club domestic league appearances and goals

Brian William Powney (born 7 October 1944) is an English former professional footballer who made more than 350 appearances in the Football League playing as a goalkeeper for Brighton & Hove Albion.

== Life and career ==
Powney was born in Seaford, East Sussex. He played schools football for his county and youth football for Eastbourne United before joining Brighton & Hove Albion as a 15-year-old. He made his first-team debut on the last day of the 1961–62 Football League season, with Albion about to be relegated to the Football League Third Division. He had a run in the team in 1963–64 after Bert McGonigal was injured, and established himself as first choice the following season. He took his totals to 351 appearances in the Football League and 386 in all first-team competitions before being released in 1974 after the signing of Peter Grummitt.

After retiring from the professional game, Powney remained active in non-League football. As player-manager of Southwick – playing in midfield – he won the 1974–75 Sussex County League title and reached the first round of that season's FA Cup, and served several other local teams as player or manager. He also played rugby for his local club. In 1996, he was regional managing director of a drinks vending company.
