= Norman Gall =

American historian

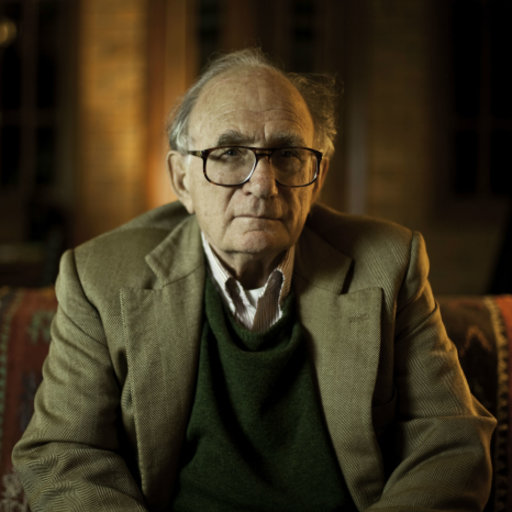
- Born: September 17, 1933 (age 93); New York City, NY, USA
- Occupation: Journalist
- Known for: Latin American affairs

Norman Gall (born September 17, 1933) is an American reporter and commentator on Latin American affairs. He has contributed to such periodicals as Forbes, The Economist, and The Wall Street Journal, and since 1987 has been the executive director of the Fernand Braudel Institute of World Economics, based in São Paulo, Brazil.

== Early life and education ==
Gall was born in the Bronx, New York, on September 17, 1933, and was educated at New York City public schools and at New York University, from which he received an A.B. in 1956.

== Career ==
From 1961 to 1964, Gall served as a reporter and Caribbean correspondent for the English-language Puerto Rican newspaper The San Juan Star .

From 1964 to 1971, he worked a freelance journalist specializing in Latin American affairs, receiving support from the Guggenheim Foundation, the Creole Foundation, the Institute of Caribbean Studies, the University of Puerto Rico (via a Ford Foundation grant), and the Woodrow Wilson School of Public and International Affairs at Princeton University. During this period he reported from many countries in the Caribbean, Central America, and South America, and wrote articles and reviews for such publications as The New York Times, The Washington Post, The Wall Street Journal, the Financial Times, The Baltimore Sun, Newsday, The Economist, The New York Review of Books, Commentary, The New Republic, The Nation, The New Leader, The Observer, the New Statesman, and The Wilson Quarterly. He was also published in a number of non-English-language publications in Europe and the Americas, such as O Estado de S. Paulo, El País, Le Monde, and Die Zeit.

From 1971 to 1978, Gall was employed by the American Universities Field Staff (AUFS), based in Caracas and São Paulo. During this time he did reporting, gave lectures, and conducted research on Venezuela, Dominican Republic, Colombia, Peru, Bolivia, Chile and Brazil. Between 1974 and 1977, on leave from AUFS and holding the title of Senior Associate at the Carnegie Endowment for International Peace, Gall conducted a three-year research project on the emergence of Brazil as a force in hemispheric affairs. From 1980 to 1987, Gall was a Contributing Editor of Forbes magazine, specializing in global economic developments, with a focus on Latin America. Since 1987, he has been executive director of the Fernand Braudel Institute of World Economics in São Paulo and editor of its newspaper of research and opinion, Braudel Papers, which is published in English, Spanish, and Portuguese. His latest Braudel Papers essay, The Happy Land: Brazil's institutions face the music (2014), stresses Brazil's need for a new strategy to overcome problems of economy and society that threaten to undermine the advances of recent decades.

Gall has worked over the years as a consultant to the Exxon Corporation (in 1979), to the World Bank (in 1984-85 and 1989–90), to the United Nations (in 1985), and to Technoplan (in 1993). A resident of Puerto Rico (1961–67) and of Venezuela (1968-74), Gall has lived in Brazil since 1977.

== Bibliography ==
=== Selected books ===
- O Terremoto Financeiro: A primeira crise global do Século XXI. Preface by Armínio Fraga. Rio de Janeiro: Elsevier/Campus, 2009.
- A Reforma Educacional de Nova York: Possibilidades para o Brasil. With Patrícia Mota Guedes. São Paulo: Itaú Social/Fernand Braudel Institute of World Economics, 2009.
- Qualidade na Educação: A luta por melhores escolas em São Paulo e Nova York. (with Patrícia Mota Guedes) São Paulo: Editora Moderna, 2007.
- Lula e Mefistófeles e outros ensaios políticos. São Paulo: Editora A Girafa, 2005.
- Energia Elétrica e Inflação Crônica no Brasil: A Descapitalização das Empresas Estatais. With Diomedes Christodoulou and Roberto Hukai. São Paulo: Fernand Braudel Institute of World Economics (1990).
- La Reforma Educativa Peruana, Lima: Mosca Azul Editores, 1976.
- America Latina: "El Pueblo de Dios." Caracas: Monte Avila Editores, 1971.

=== Selected reports ===
Gall has written many extensive reports, some of them book-length, on a variety of social and economic issues for a range of clients. For example, "Argentine Inflation: When Will It Stop?" (1979) was a report to Exxon on Argentina's inflationary crisis, "El Alto de La Paz" (1985) was a report to the World Bank on poverty in Bolivia, "examining how an urban society relapses into ruralism and becomes increasingly dependent on foreign food donations for survival"; "The Political Economy of Petrobras" (1985) was a report to the UN's ILO/Norway project on the oil industry; "Chronic Inflation as Systemic Failure" (1992) was a report to the World Bank "on long-term impacts of chronic inflation on institutions, infrastructure and the survival of complex societies."

=== Journalism ===
Gall also does journalism, writing for a wide range of international periodicals about a wide range of countries not only in Latin America, but around the world, from a wide range of perspectives – economic, social, political, and cultural. {{Citation needed}} To an extent he has devoted himself to very long-form articles, often spending months visiting a country or region and producing almost book-length essays that provide detailed reportage as well as extensive analysis and commentary. {{Citation needed}}

In the 1960s he wrote hundreds of articles for major publications about such topics as education in rural Puerto Rico, labor trouble on the San Juan waterfront, small factories in the Puerto Rican town of Aibonito, poverty in the Puerto Rican interior, guerrillas in Colombia, economic development in Bolivia, mining in Bolivia, violence in Nicaragua, the Duvalier regime in Haiti, political assassinations in the Dominican Republic, Maoist guerrillas in Peru, guerrillas in Venezuela, guerillas in Guatemala, church-state relations in Castro's Cuba, the detention of Juan Perón in Rio de Janeiro, and social tensions in Ciudad Juarez. He was the first to disclose the CIA's role in the 1961 assassination of Dominican dictator Rafael Trujillo and the first to report in detail on the peasant revolts in southern Peru. His reports on human rights issues include "Slaughter in Guatemala" [The New York Review of Books, May 20, 1971] and "Santo Domingo: The Politics of Terror" [The New York Review of Books, July 2, 1971]. In the 1970s he covered the election of Salvador Allende ["Chile Has Elected A Revolution", The New York Times Magazine, November 1, 1970]. His 25,000-word article "Peru: The Master is Dead", published in Dissent, June 1971, was a detailed study of that country's military regime and agrarian reforms. "Peru's Education Reform" was a book-length 1974 report for AUFS about education in Peru; it was published in Spanish as La Reforma Educativa Peruana, Lima: Mosca Azul Editores, 1976. Throughout his five decades of reporting and research on Latin America, Gall has maintained a strong interest in public education, participating in the Braudel Institute's Reading Circles, in which the world's classic literature are read and discussed by Brazilian secondary school students. In a Braudel Papers essay published in 2016, "Ceará goes to school: Shakespeare in Quixeramobim," Gall describes the impact of school reform in the back country of one of Brazil's poorest states.

In a 1971 article in Commentary, "How Castro Failed," Gall wrote that Castro had "dominated his island and conducted its diplomacy with the art and authority of a Renaissance prince, while leading his countrymen through the most drastic social revolution Latin America has seen in this century...No dictator within memory has combined Fidel Castro's prodigious personal powers: great physical stamina and audacity; a memory of near-total recall; an amazing virtuosity at intrigue and maneuver; an imposing platform presence and an overpowering oratorical style drawing with equal effectiveness on comic and sentimental histrionics." He described Castro's "destruction...of freedom of discussion and criticism" as entailing a "complete and open rupture...with the Western intellectual tradition." He also compared recent certain developments in Castro's Cuba with developments that took place in China after the Great Leap Forward and which were "consummated by the Cultural Revolution."

Commentary also published Gall's long article "The rise of Brazil" in January 1977. "In a relatively short period of time," Gall wrote, "Brazil has become a new political force in the Western Hemisphere. The world's largest and most important tropical nation, and roughly equal in size, population, and gross product to all the rest of South America, Brazil has developed into the world's tenth largest economy, a major trading partner of the industrial powers, and one of the most rewarding fields of investment for their surplus capital." "Atoms for Brazil, Dangers for All" was a 17,000-word 1976 essay on the Brazil-German nuclear deal, published in both Foreign Policy and Bulletin of the Atomic Scientists.

During the 1980s Gall wrote dozens of articles for Forbes, including many cover stories. "The World Gasps for Liquidity" (October 11, 1982) pondered the international implications of economic developments in Mexico. "Can Mexico Pull Through?" (August 15, 1983), argued that "Mexico's chronic water shortage threatens to limit further economic development and to greatly decrease its self-sufficiency in food production." "Japan Inc.: And Now the Bad News" (January 31, 1983) and "Japan: The Next Great Creditor Nation" (February 14, 1983) foresaw economic problems for Japan. "Brazil and the Bankers" (December 5, 1983) examined Brazil's failure to pay its foreign debt. "Does anyone really believe in free trade?" (December 15, 1986) studied Brazil's new computer industry. "What Ails the Developing Economies?" (July 28, 1986) criticized Third World over-urbanization. "The Dollar: Too Strong for Our Own Good" (February 28, 1983) was about America's transformation into a debtor nation.

Since 1987, Gall's own publication, the Braudel Papers, has provided him with a ready forum for his probing, long-form journalism. One example of this is "Part 1: Why Chávez?", the first half of a 2006 article about Venezuela, Gall provided a comprehensive indictment of the Chávez regime, writing that "Venezuela stands as a warning to the rest of Latin America of the costs of the degradation and failure of public institutions" and that "Venezuela inspires sadness, fear and indignation" at what the disorder under Chávez, "an exotic and archaic leader," might bring. Gall noted that while other nations in Latin America had struggled with many of the same problems as Venezuela, they had nonetheless "adhered to the path of democratic continuity and reform, while Chávez seeks to revive archaic forms of populism and military dictatorship." Gall outlined the chaos of administration and finances under the Venezuelan leader, the collapse of infrastructure, and the skyrocketing murder rate.

In 2007, Gall wrote a portrait of São Paulo, noting that "For the first time in history, majority of the world's population now lives in cities," and that "the names of vast new megacities – Dhaka, Lagos, Calcutta, Jakarta – are synonymous with human misery. But São Paulo is seeking to show that a megacity can work." His description of the city was blunt: "São Paulo is a great city, but not a beautiful city. The soot-darkened buildings of its old business center resist all claims of glamour or novelty. Its periphery is an oceanic sprawl, bursting with gaudy commerce and neighborhoods where many thousands of shacks have become, within a generation, sturdy but nondescript houses of brick and concrete. Its residents are regularly shocked by corruption, prison revolts, failing public education, truck hijackings, armed robberies, and murders at traffic lights."

Over the past three decades he has warned of the dangers embedded in the global proliferation of financial assets, first in a long cover story for Forbes "Recycling Petrodollars: How Much More Can the System Take?" (1980) and later in a series of Braudel Papers essays on the Asia crisis "Money, Greed, Technology" (1998) and on the credit expansion in the new century "Millions, Billions, Trillions" (2009).

In 2012, in a Braudel Papers essay on "Water in China," Gall drew attention to an issue that has received relatively little attention in Western coverage of China – the problem of water shortages in the country, which, he argued, may have an adverse impact on China's "growth and stability, weakening its thrust as a global power as it embarks upon an assertive role in world affairs for the first time in its millennial history as a unified state." Indeed, maintained Gall, "Water shortages may prove to be far more important for China's future than the scandals and power struggles inside the Communist Party leadership that recently captured international attention." He quoted Wang Shucheng, a former Chinese minister of water resources: "To fight for every drop of water or die: that is the challenge facing China." Most recently, he published an essay in The New York Review of Books (October 22, 2015) on "Why the Water Is Running Out", dealing with the global problem of population pressures on limited water resources in megacities of at least 10 million people.

In recent years, living in Brazil, Gall has focused his interest particularly on that country, revisiting the subject of Brazil's wealth, for example, in an August 2010 article for the Financial Times. "Brazil," he noted in that article, "is flying high. Having emerged unscathed from the 2008 financial crisis, its economy has been growing at 9 per cent a year. Its hugely popular president, Luiz Inácio Lula da Silva, now in his last months in office, seemed set to retire with a chorus of praise – until he plunged into the complications of deepwater drilling. Just as Icarus saw his wings of wax melt as he flew too close to the sun, so Mr Lula is risking his legacy as controversies multiply over his petroleum policies." On March 31, 2011, Gall gave a lecture at the University of Chicago on the subject "Oil, Euphoria, and Brazil's Future." On July 26, 2012, Gall was one of the speakers at "Brazil: Midyear Economic and Political Outlook", an event in New York sponsored by the Brazilian American Chamber of Commerce.

== Honors and awards ==
Gall was awarded a Guggenheim Fellowship in 1968 to study Iberian and Latin American History. He was a visiting fellow at the Woodrow Wilson School of Public and International Affairs at Princeton University from 1967 to 1968 and from 1972 to 1973. In 2010, he was awarded the Maria Moors Cabot prize, the world's oldest international award for journalism, by the Columbia University School of Journalism. The School of Journalism, in announcing the prize, noted that "Norman Gall has been reporting on the Americas for half a century. He covered the devastation of the Amazon in the 1970s, the vulnerabilities of Mexico's Institutional Revolutionary Party regime in the 1980s and, more recently, the institutional weaknesses revealed in Brazil by a major corruption scandal that shook President Luiz Inácio Lula da Silva's government in 2005. In the last decade, Gall has bridged the worlds of journalism and scholarship as the founder and creator of the São Paulo-based Fernand Braudel Instituto de Economia Mundial, where he writes and publishes in-depth reports in English, Portuguese and Spanish." The award citation praised Gall's "half a century of reporting, analysis and commentary on the Americas... unparalleled in its breadth, reach and quality."

== Personal life ==
Gall is married to Catalina Pagés Lamas and has two children, Sarah (born 1971) and Jonathan (born 1974).
