= Mirta Aguirre =

Poet, novelist, journalist, activist (1912–1980)

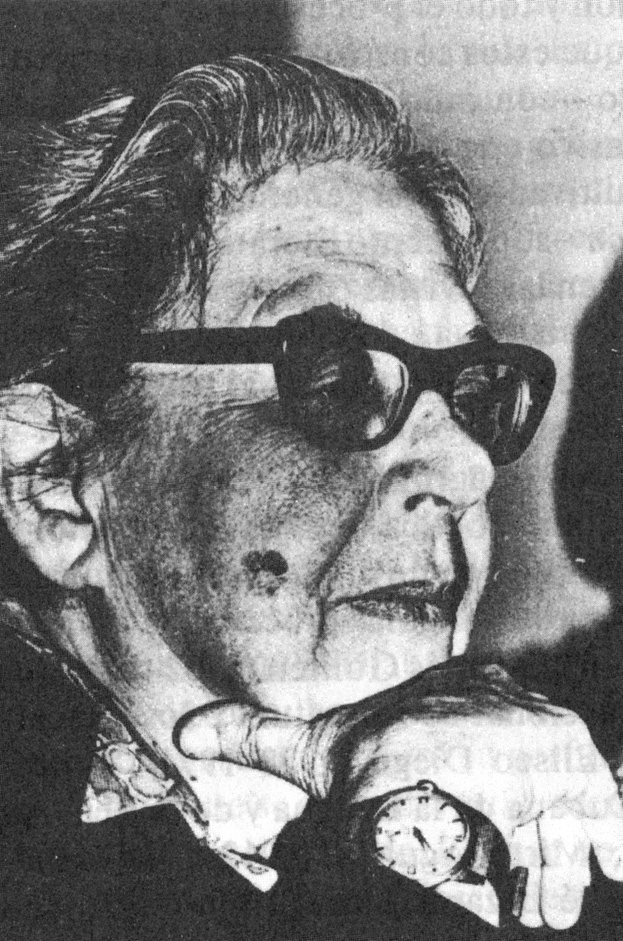
Mirta Aguirre

Mirta Aguirre Carreras (18 October 1912 – 8 August 1980) was a Cuban poet, novelist, journalist. She has been called "the most important female academic and woman of letters in post-revolutionary Cuba".

== Life ==
Aguirre joined the Cuban Communist Party in 1932. She was a contributor to Juan Ramón Jiménez's 1936 anthology of Cuban poetry. In the early 1950s she was a regular contributor to the bi-monthly Mujeres cubana [Cuban Women]. Her poetry was influenced by the criollismo of Nicolás Guillen and García Lorca's idea of the 'Romancero gitano', which Aguirre adapted to tell stories of revolutionary achievement.

== Works ==
- Presencia interior [Interior Presence], 1938
- Influencia de la mujer en Iberoamerica [The Influence of Women In Latin America], 1948. Winner of the Iboamerican Floral Games.
- Juegos y otros poema, [Games and other poems], 1974
- "Juegos y otros Poemas," 1974
- "La Obra Narrativa de Cervantes," 1971, 1978
- Ayer de hoy [Yesterday of Today], 1980
