= Mariblanca Sabas Alomá =

Cuban feminist, activist, journalist and poet

- Born: Mariblanca Sabas Alomá; February 10, 1901; Santiago de Cuba, Cuba
- Died: July 19, 1983 (aged 82); Havana, Cuba

Mariblanca Sabas Alomá (February 10, 1901 – July 19, 1983) was a Cuban feminist, journalist and poet. A political activist, she was also a Minister without portfolio in the Cuban government under Carlos Prio. Her writing was devoted to the cause of women's rights, particularly the right to vote.

== Biography ==
She was born in Santiago de Cuba in 1901. Her parents were Francisco Sabas Castillo and Belén Alomá Ciarlos. She studied at University of Havana, Columbia University and University of Puerto Rico. A founding member of the Grupo Minorista, she also served as president of the Partido Democrata Sufragista, and editor of La Mujer. She wrote columns in the leftist periodicals, Social and Carteles. For Carteles, she wrote a series of homophobic articles in 1928 on female homosexuality, identifying lesbianism as a social disease. She also wrote for Bohemia and Avance (1920s-1930s), in 1930 she published a book titled Feminismo - Cuestiones Sociales - Critica Literarea and founded the magazine Astral (1922). Her poetry won two gold medals in 1923 at Juegos Florales in Santiago de Cuba. In 1919, following the death of her parents, she moved to Havana. In 1923, Sabas Alomá attended the first Congreso Nacional de Mujeres de Cuba.

"I consider it an honor to have been imprisoned for fighting for the good of my country. And some of the very best people in Cuba were in jail at that time so I was in good company." (1949)

After working for several newspapers and journals between 1924 and 1927, She took time off from her journalistic career to pursue art and literature studies in Mexico, at Columbia University and at the University of Puerto Rico. After her return to Havana, she worked on a regular basis for the Carteles. Her writing were critical of the bourgeois (the social elite) and considered them as contributing to the suffering of majority of women. She was given the epithet "Red Feminist" for her writings in the Carteles because of her strong feminist perspective and her leftist leanings. In her writings, she protested against the stereotyping of feminists, defended nudity, rejected elitism, and argued for the radical revision of masculinity and femininity categories. She served as a Minister without portfolio in 1949.
