= List of Brighton & Hove Albion F.C. players =

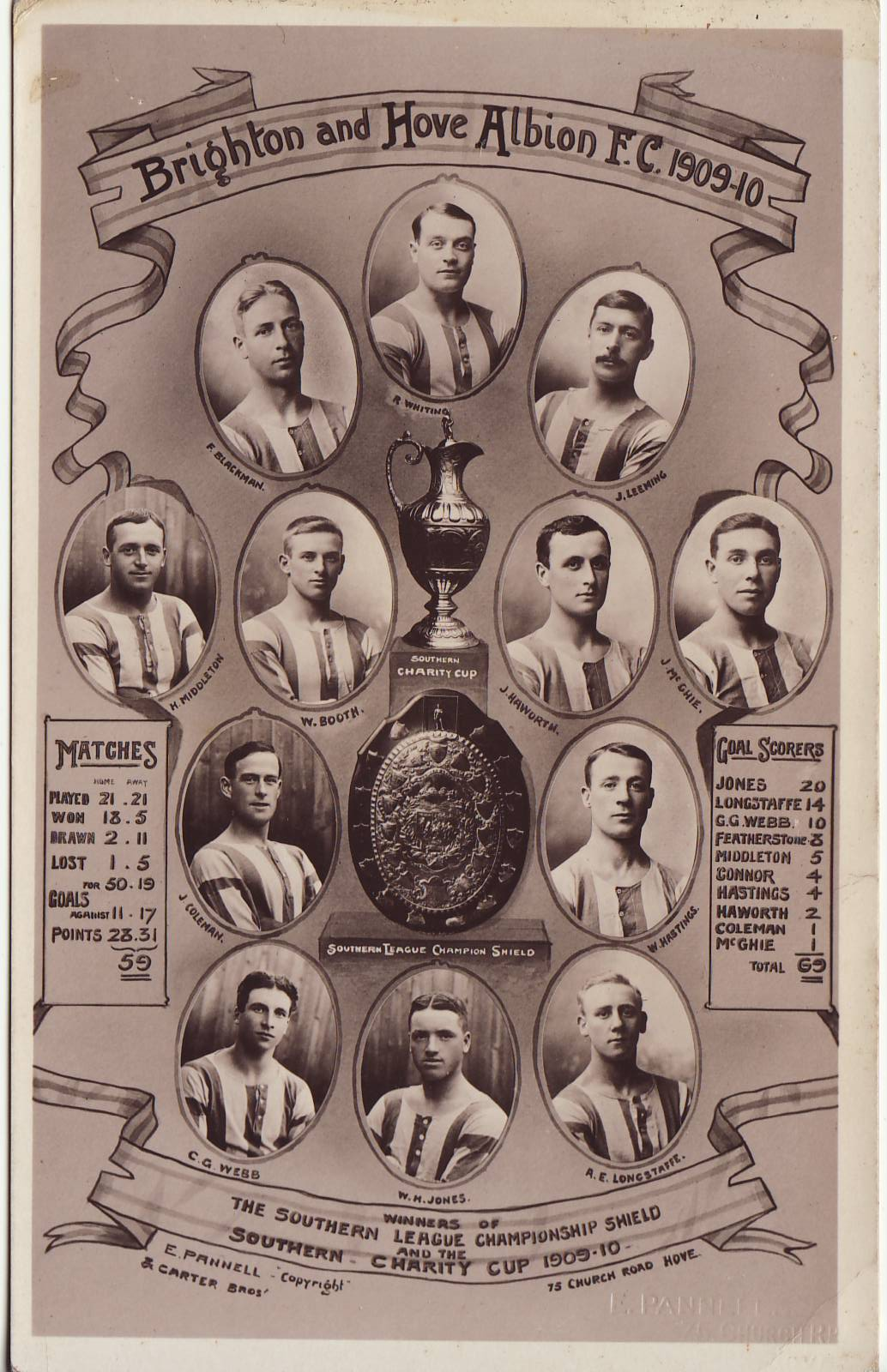
The Brighton & Hove Albion F.C. team of 1909–10, winners of the Southern League title and the Southern Professional Charity Cup. Eight of the twelve men pictured played 100 or more senior matches for the club.

Brighton & Hove Albion F.C., an English association football club based in the city of Brighton & Hove, East Sussex, was founded in 1901. Its first team entered the Southern League and the FA Cup in 1901–02, and in 1920–21 were founder members of the Football League Third Division, which became the Third Division South the following year. They spent four seasons in the First Division in the early 1980s, but soon returned to the lower divisions. In 1997, the club lost its ground and the team nearly dropped out of the League. Twenty years later, they were promoted to the Premier League.

The club's first team have competed in numerous nationally and regionally organised competitions, and all players who have played in 100 or more such matches, either as a member of the starting eleven or as a substitute, are listed below. Each player's details include the duration of his Albion career, his typical playing position while with the club, and the number of matches played and goals scored in domestic league matches and in all senior competitive matches. Where applicable, the list also includes the national team(s) for which the player was selected, and the number of senior international caps he won while an Albion player.

== Introduction ==
Of the just over 200 men who made 100 or more appearances in first-team competition for Brighton & Hove Albion, Tug Wilson has 75 more appearances than the next contender. He came into the team in 1922, and over the next 12 seasons averaged around 44 competitive matches a season, taking his total to 566 by the time he retired in 1936. Tommy Cook tops the club's all-time scorers list, with 123 goals from 209 peacetime matches. Kit Napier's 99 remained a post-Second World War record for nearly 50 years, until Glenn Murray scored his 100th Albion goal in October 2018. Arthur Attwood's club record of 35 goals scored in a single season stood for 45 years, until Peter Ward went one better in 1976–77 to set a mark that still stands. Eric Gill set the club record for consecutive appearances with 247 in the mid-1950s.

Charlie Webb became the first man to be capped for his country while a Brighton & Hove Albion player when he represented Ireland against Scotland in the 1908–09 British Home Championship. Albion's first England international was Tommy Cook, who played against Wales in 1925; Billy Booth was selected as travelling reserve in 1913, but his services were not needed. The man with most caps for his country while an Albion player is Shane Duffy for Republic of Ireland with 30; he overtook the previous record of 17, held jointly by Gerry Ryan and Steve Penney, in October 2018. Peter Harburn was inadvertently named in the Great Britain squad preparing for the 1956 Olympics, for which, as a professional, he was ineligible.

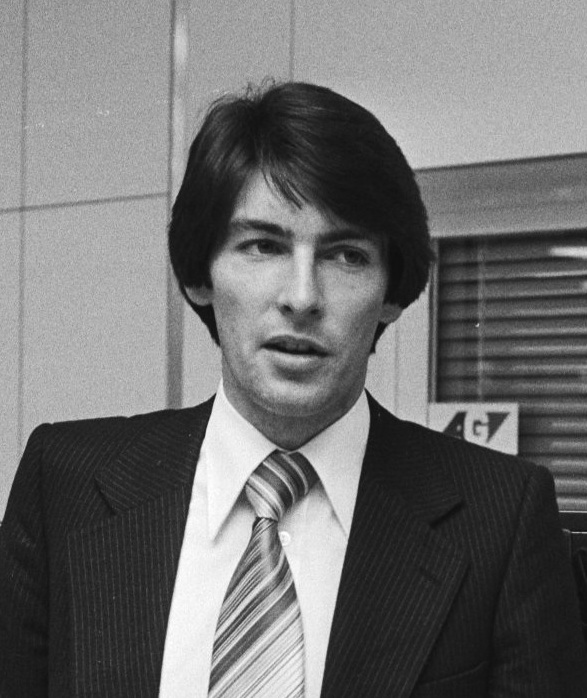
Gordon Smith is remembered less for the goal he did score in the 1983 FA Cup Final than for the one he must score but did not.

Six men listed here – Webb, Cook, Chris Cattlin, Jimmy Case, Brian Horton and Dean Wilkins – went on to manage the club, while Joe Wilson, Glen Wilson and Nathan Jones had spells as caretaker manager.

Other players took part in significant matches in the history of the club. Eight men listed here were on the winning side in the 1910 FA Charity Shield match, in which Albion as Southern League champions faced 1909–10 Football League champions Aston Villa. Charlie Webb scored the only goal of the match to secure what, as of 2023, remains the club's only major national trophy, and Billy Booth, Bill Hastings, Bullet Jones, Joe Leeming, Bert Longstaff, Joe McGhie and Bob Whiting also played. Five of the team that contested Albion's first Football League fixture in 1920 – George Coomber, Billy Hayes, Wally Little, Longstaff and Jack Woodhouse – are listed here, as are nine of the twelve who faced Manchester United in the 1983 FA Cup Final. The scores were level at 2–2, with goals from Gordon Smith and Gary Stevens, until the last moments of extra time, when Smith had a clear chance to score a winning goal. Peter Jones's radio commentary became famous: "and Smith must score...", he cried, just before the shot was blocked by the goalkeeper's legs. Albion lost the replay 4–0, and were relegated that same season.

Stuart Tuck, Jeff Minton, Gary Hobson, Stuart Storer, Kerry Mayo and Ross Johnson played, and Nicky Rust was an unused substitute, in the match against Hereford United in May 1997 that maintained Albion's Football League status at their opponents' expense. Less than twenty years later, Albion made their debut in the Premier League, in a 2–0 defeat at home to Manchester City: eleven of the fourteen who took the field that day made more than 100 appearances for the club.

Many Albion players served their country in times of war. Bob Whiting and Arthur Hulme were killed in action during the First World War, while Tommy Allsopp died from influenza contracted on his way home from France after the war ended.

== Key ==
- The list is ordered first by number of appearances in total, then by number of League appearances, and then if necessary by date of debut.
- Appearances as a substitute are included.
- All statistics, both in prose and table, are correct up to and including 23 July 2024. Where a player left the club permanently after this date, his statistics are updated to his date of leaving.

Positions key
Pre-1960s		1960s–present	
GK	Goalkeeper		
FB	Full back	DF	Defender
HB	Half-back	MF	Midfielder
FW	Forward		
U	Utility player		

Player
Players marked * were registered for the club as at the date specified above.
Position
Playing positions are listed according to the tactical formations that were employed at the time. Thus the change in the names of defensive and midfield positions reflects the tactical evolution that occurred from the 1960s onwards.
Club career
Club career is defined as the first and last calendar years in which the player appeared for the club in any of the competitions listed below. Sourced to Carder & Harris (1997), pp. 349–354 or individually. Separate spells listed separately.
League appearances and League goals
League appearances and goals comprise those in the Southern League (1901–02 to 1919–20), Football League (1920–21 to 2016–17), and Premier League (from 2017–18). Appearances in the 1939–40 Football League season, abandoned after three games because of the Second World War, are excluded. In its early years, the club's first team competed in other leagues as secondary competitions, and appearances in these are counted in the Total column.
Total appearances and Total goals
Total appearances and goals comprise those in all first-team competitions, i.e. Premier League, Football League and playoffs, FA Cup, League Cup, Full Members' Cup, Associate Members' Cup/Football League Trophy, Third Division South Cup, Southern League and promotion test match, FA Charity Shield, South-Eastern League (1902–03 season), United League (1905–06 and 1906–07), Western League (1907–08 and 1908–09) and championship match, Southern Football Alliance (1912–13 and 1913–14) and Southern Professional Charity Cup. Matches in wartime competitions are excluded.
International selection
Countries are listed only for players who have been selected for international football. Only the highest level of international competition is given, except where a player represented more than one country, in which case the highest level reached for each country is shown.
Caps
For players having played at full international level, the caps column counts the number of such appearances during his career with the club. Matches played while on loan to another club are excluded. All information relating to international selection, including number of full caps won while with the club, is sourced to Carder & Harris (1997), pp. 345–346 unless otherwise noted.

== Players with 100 or more appearances ==
Table of players, including playing position, club statistics and international selection
Player	Pos	Club career	League		Total		International selection	Caps	Notes	Refs
Player	Pos	Club career	Apps	Goals	Apps	Goals	International selection	Caps	Notes	Refs
Tug Wilson	FW	1922–1936	509	67	566	71	—	—		
Peter O'Sullivan	MF	1970–1981	435	39	491	43	Wales	3		
Norman Gall	DF	1962–1974	440	4	488	4	—	—		
Lewis Dunk *	DF	2010–present	411	26	459	31	England	6		
Bert Longstaff	FW	1906–1921	356	63	443	86	—	—		
Glen Wilson	HB	1949–1960	409	25	436	28	English schools	—		
Bobby Farrell	FW	1928–1939	382	66	430	84	—	—		
Des Tennant	U	1948–1958	400	40	424	47	—	—		
Gary Hart	MF	1998–2011	373	44	417	45	—	—		
Kerry Mayo	DF	1996–2009	368	12	413	14	—	—		
Reg Wilkinson	HB	1924–1934	361	14	396	16	—	—		
Brian Powney	GK	1962–1974	351	0	386	0	—	—		
Dean Wilkins	MF	1983–1984; 1987–1996	312	25	375	31	—	—		
Steve Gatting	DF / MF	1981–1991	316	19	369	21	—	—		
Billy Booth	HB	1908–1920	303	8	369	12	—	—		
Dave Walker	U	1929–1939	310	28	349	30	—	—		
Adam El-Abd	DF	2003–2014	300	5	342	7	Egypt	6		
Dave Turner	HB	1963–1972	300	30	338	34	—	—		
Wally Little	FB / HB	1919–1929	308	32	332	36	—	—		
Steve Foster	DF	1979–1984; 1992–1995	287	13	332	15	England	3		
Ian Chapman	DF / MF	1987–1996	281	14	331	16	English schools	—		
Bob Whiting	GK	1908–1915	253	0	320	0	—	—		
Potter Smith	FW / HB	1929–1937	281	40	319	57	—	—		
Paul Mooney	HB	1925–1935	283	10	315	11	—	—		
Robert Codner	MF	1988–1995	266	39	315	47	England semi-pro	—		
Roy Jennings	DF	1953–1964	276	22	297	22	England youth	—		
Eric Gill	GK	1952–1959	280	0	296	0	—	—		
Dennis Gordon	FW	1952–1961	277	62	293	64	—	—		
Kit Napier	FW	1966–1972	256	84	291	99	—	—		
Glenn Murray	FW	2008–2011; 2016–2020	259	103	287	111	—	—	(Note: AFC Bournemouth)	
Michel Kuipers	GK	2000–2010	247	0	287	0	—	—		
Solly March *	MF	2013–present	257	21	286	25	England U21	—		
Jack Bertolini	HB	1958–1965	258	12	279	14	—	—		
Richard Carpenter	MF	2000–2007	252	19	279	23	—	—		
Charlie Webb	FW	1909–1915	219	64	275	79	Ireland	3		
George Coomber	HB	1913–1924	243	5	272	6	—	—		
Pascal Groß	MF	2017–2024	228	30	261	32	Germany	8		
John Templeman	DF / MF	1966–1974	226	16	255	18	—	—		
Steve Burtenshaw	HB	1953–1966	237	3	252	3	—	—		
Brian Horton	MF	1976–1981	218	33	252	41	—	—		
Gary Chivers	DF	1988–1993	217	14	252	16	—	—		
Charlie Oatway	MF	1999–2005	224	9	248	10	—	—		
John Napier	DF	1967–1972	219	5	247	5	Northern Ireland	0		
John Crumplin	DF / MF	1987–1994	207	7	245	9	—	—		
Danny Cullip	DF	1999–2004	217	7	242	11	—	—	(Note: Brentford)	
Jack Woodhouse	HB	1912–1923	202	16	241	22	—	—		
Joe Leeming	FB	1908–1914	193	0	238	0	—	—		
Bruno	DF	2012–2019	225	6	235	6	—	—		
Stan Webb	GK	1925–1934	205	0	234	0	—	—		
Jimmy Hopkins	FW	1923–1929	220	72	233	75	Ireland	1		
Gordon Greer	DF	2010–2016	209	5	233	5	Scotland	11		
Eddie Spearritt	U	1969–1974	210	22	232	25	—	—		
Iñigo Calderón	DF	2010–2016	198	18	232	19	—	—		
Jack Jenkins	FB	1922–1928	216	4	231	4	Wales	8		
Len Darling	HB	1933–1948	199	5	228	7	—	—		
Peter Ward	FW	1976–1980; 1982–1983	194	81	227	95	England	1	(Note: Nottingham Forest)	
Stewart Henderson	DF	1966–1972	198	1	226	1	Scottish schools	—		
Billy Hayes	GK	1919–1924	209	0	225	0	—	—		
Graham Moseley	GK	1978–1985	189	0	224	0	England youth	—		
Dale Stephens	MF	2014–2020	213	14	223	15	—	—		
Jimmy Collins	FW	1962–1967	201	44	221	48	Scottish Junior	—		
Paul Watson	DF	1999–2005	197	14	221	18	—	—		
Bobby Baxter	DF	1961–1967	195	6	220	7	—	—		
Denis Foreman	FW	1952–1961	211	63	219	69	—	—		
Frankie Howard	FW	1950–1958	200	26	219	31	—	—		
Ernie King	FB	1932–1938	186	0	217	0	—	—		
Paul McCarthy	DF	1990–1996	181	6	217	8	Republic of Ireland U21	—		
Guy Butters	DF	2002–2008	187	8	212	9	England U21	—		
Tommy Cook	FW	1922–1929	190	114	209	123	England	1		
Nicky Rust	GK	1993–1998	177	0	209	0	England youth	—		
Bert Stephens	FW	1935–1947	180	86	205	96	—	—		
Jess Willard	FW / HB	1947–1953	190	22	202	24	—	—		
Perry Digweed	GK	1981–1993	179	0	201	0	England U21 squad	—		
Gerry Ryan	MF	1978–1985	173	32	199	39	Republic of Ireland	17		
Jeff Minton	MF	1994–1999	174	31	198	32	England youth	—		
Dean Hammond	MF	2000–2008; 2012–2013	173	23	196	28	—	—	(Note: Southampton)	
Jack Nightingale	FW	1921–1927	182	33	195	33	—	—		
Jack Curran	FB	1925–1930	180	0	193	0	Ireland	0		
Wally Gould	MF	1964–1968	168	45	193	46	—	—		
Andy Rollings	DF	1974–1979	168	11	192	12	—	—		
Charlie Thomson	GK	1934–1939	169	0	191	0	—	—		
Harry Marsden	FB	1929–1934	164	0	191	0	—	—		
Steve Piper	DF / MF	1972–1977	162	9	190	9	—	—		
Andy Neil	FW	1920–1924; 1926–1927	167	28	185	30	—	—		
Harry Baldwin	GK	1945–1951	164	0	183	0	—	—	(Note: Player statistics exclude match(es) played in the abandoned 1939–40 Football League season.)	
Tony Towner	MF	1973–1978	162	24	183	25	—	—		
Jimmy Case	MF	1981–1985; 1994–1995	159	10	183	15	England U23	—		
Nathan Jones	DF	2000–2005	159	7	183	8	—	—		
Kazenga LuaLua	MF	2010; 2011–2016	158	17	183	22	—	—	(Note: Newcastle United)	
Ken Whitfield	HB	1954–1958	175	4	182	4	—	—		
Tommy Elphick	DF	2005–2011	153	7	182	9	—	—		
Dan Kirkwood	FW	1928–1933	168	74	181	82	—	—		
Ernie Marriott	FB	1935–1948	163	1	180	2	—	—		
Bullet Jones	FW	1909–1912; 1913–1919	156	63	179	69	—	—		
Dean Cox	MF	2005–2010	146	16	179	22	—	—		
Jimmy Langley	DF	1953–1957	166	14	178	16	England	0		
Albert Mundy	FW	1953–1958	165	87	178	90	—	—		
Gary Williams	DF	1977–1982	158	7	177	8	—	—		
Johnny Goodchild	FW	1961–1966	163	44	176	46	—	—		
Joe Wilson	FW	1936–1947	156	15	175	18	—	—		
Chris Hutchings	DF / MF	1983–1987	153	4	175	6	—	—		
Terry Connor	FW	1983–1987	156	51	174	59	England U21	—		
Mark Lawrenson	DF	1977–1981	152	5	174	7	Republic of Ireland	14		
Arthur Hulme	FB / HB	1902–1908	112	2	174	7	—	—		
Ted Martin	FB	1932–1945	155	4	172	4	—	—		
Ashley Barnes	FW	2010–2014	149	46	170	53	Austria U20	—	(Note: Plymouth Argyle)	
Garry Nelson	FW	1987–1991	144	47	166	59	—	—		
Peter Smith	DF	1994–1999	140	5	166	6	—	—		
Johnny McNichol	FW	1948–1952	158	37	165	39	—	—		
Bobby Zamora	FW	2000–2003; 2015–2016	151	83	162	90	England	0	(Note: Bristol Rovers)	
Steve Penney	MF	1983–1989	138	14	162	15	Northern Ireland	17		
Stuart Storer	FW	1995–1999	142	11	161	14	—	—		
John Keeley	GK	1986–1990	138	0	160	0	—	—		
Gunner Higham	HB	1908–1920	124	0	159	1	—	—		
Peter Grummitt	GK	1973–1977	136	0	158	0	England U23	—	(Note: Sheffield Wednesday)	
Adam Virgo	DF	2001–2005; 2008–2010	134	14	158	17	Scotland B	—		
Joe McGhie	HB	1909–1913	133	3	156	3	Scottish Junior	—		
Danny Wilson	MF	1983–1987	135	33	155	39	Northern Ireland	3		
Gary Dicker	MF	2009–2013	138	6	153	6	Republic of Ireland U21	—	(Note: Stockport County)	
Gary Stevens	DF / MF	1979–1983	133	2	152	3	England	0		
Keith Dublin	DF	1987–1990	132	5	151	6	England youth	—		
Liam Bridcutt	MF	2010–2014	132	2	151	2	Scotland	1		
Ken Tiler	DF	1974–1978	130	0	151	0	—	—		
Harry Kent	HB	1905–1908	104	11	151	16	—	—		
Reg Smith	FB	1923–1930	143	1	150	1	—	—		
Shane Duffy	DF	2016–2022	140	9	150	9	Republic of Ireland; Northern Ireland B	41		
Ian Mellor	FW	1974–1978	122	31	150	35	—	—		
Paul Brooker	MF	2000–2003	134	15	149	16	—	—	(Note: Fulham)	
Jack Stevens	HB	1934–1939	137	0	148	0	—	—		
Eric Young	DF	1983–1987	126	10	148	11	Wales	0		
Jake Robinson	FW	2003–2009	123	13	148	22	—	—		
Ross Johnson	DF	1993–1999	132	2	147	2	—	—		
Howard Wilkinson	MF	1966–1971	129	18	147	19	England youth	—		
Mike Tiddy	FW	1958–1962	133	11	146	12	—	—		
Harry Wilson	DF	1973–1977	130	4	146	4	England youth	—		
Charlie Livesey	FW	1965–1969	126	28	146	37	—	—		
Frank Brett	DF	1930–1935	131	0	143	0	—	—		
Frank Spencer	FB	1912–1920	109	0	142	0	—	—		
Kevin Bremner	FW	1987–1990	128	35	141	40	—	—		
David Stockdale	GK	2014–2017	133	0	139	0	England squad	—		
Anthony Knockaert	MF	2016–2019	127	25	139	27	France U21	—		
Joël Veltman *	MF	2020–present	120	4	139	4	Netherlands	6		
Adam Webster *	DF	2019–present	124	6	138	7	England U19	—		
Paul Rogers	MF	1999–2003	119	15	138	16	England semi-pro	—		
Tom Turner	FB	1905–1909	91	0	136	0	Scottish Junior	—		
Peter Harburn	FW	1955–1958	126	61	133	65	—	—		
Michael Robinson	FW	1980–1983	113	37	133	43	Republic of Ireland	13		
Billy Reed	FW	1948–1953	129	36	132	37	Wales	0		
Alan Curbishley	MF	1987–1990	116	13	132	15	England U21	—		
Beram Kayal	MF	2015–2019	118	4	131	5	Israel	17		
Archie Needham	U	1911–1915	98	11	131	14	—	—		
Clive Walker	MF	1990–1993	105	8	130	12	English schools	—		
Bill Cassidy	HB / FW	1962–1966	118	25	129	30	—	—		
Ian McNeill	FW	1959–1962	116	12	128	13	Scotland youth	—		
Nobby Lawton	MF	1967–1971	112	12	127	16	—	—		
Andrew Whing	DF	2006; 2007–2011	103	0	126	0	—	—	(Note: Coventry City)	
Andrew Crofts	MF	2009–2010; 2012–2016	115	10	125	13	Wales	5		
Gordon Smith	FW	1980–1984	109	22	125	25	Scotland U21	—		
Danny Welbeck *	FW	2020–present	109	23	125	26	England	0		
Yves Bissouma	MF	2018–2022	112	3	124	6	Mali	11		
Nicky Bissett	DF	1988–1994	97	8	124	8	—	—		
Mat Ryan	GK	2017–2020	121	0	123	0	Australia	26		
Tommy Bisset	FB	1953–1960	115	5	123	5	—	—		
Gary O'Reilly	DF	1984–1986; 1991–1992	107	6	123	6	Republic of Ireland youth; English schools	—		
Jack Mansell	FB	1949–1952	116	9	122	11	England B	—		
Craig Mackail-Smith	FW	2011–2015	109	21	122	24	Scotland; England C	6		
Leandro Trossard	FW	2019–2022	116	25	121	25	Belgium	22		
Davy Pröpper	MF	2017–2021	107	2	121	2	Netherlands	14		
Tony Grealish	MF	1981–1984	100	6	121	8	Republic of Ireland	11		
Leon Knight	FW	2003–2005	108	34	120	36	England U20	—	(Note: Chelsea)	
Kurt Nogan	FW	1992–1995	97	49	120	60	Wales B	—		
Nicky Forster	FW	2007–2010	98	40	119	51	England U21	—		
Walter Anthony	FW	1905–1908	80	8	119	13	—	—		
Jack Ball	GK	1946–1953	113	0	118	0	—	—		
Tim McCoy	HB	1951–1953	112	0	117	0	—	—		
Stuart Munday	DF / MF	1992–1996	97	4	117	5	—	—		
Sam Jennings	FW	1925–1928	110	61	115	63	—	—		
Jimmy Leadbetter	FW	1952–1955	107	29	115	33	—	—		
Neil McNab	MF	1980–1983	103	4	115	5	Scotland U21	—		
Brian Tawse	MF	1965–1969	102	14	114	16	—	—		
Jack Whent	HB	1945–1946; 1947–1950	101	4	114	4	—	—		
Chris Cattlin	DF	1976–1979	95	1	114	2	England U23	—		
Adam Hinshelwood	DF	2002–2009	99	2	113	2	—	—		
Gary Hobson	DF	1996–2000	98	1	113	1	—	—		
Alexis Mac Allister	MF	2020–2023	98	16	112	20	Argentina	14		
Bill Miller	FW	1910–1921	91	40	112	52	—	—		
Dickie Joynes	FW	1905–1908	70	10	112	22	—	—		
John Byrne	FW	1990–1991; 1993; 1995–1996	97	22	110	28	Republic of Ireland	1	(Note: Millwall)	
Bert Murray	U	1971–1973	102	25	109	26	England U23	—	(Note: Birmingham City)	
Neal Maupay	FW	2019–2022	102	26	109	27	France U21	—		
Will Buckley	MF	2011–2015	96	19	109	19	—	—		
Stuart Tuck	DF	1993–1998	93	1	109	1	—	—		
Graham Pearce	DF	1982–1986	88	2	109	2	—	—		
Tomer Hemed	FW	2015–2018	97	30	108	33	Israel	14		
Skilly Williams	GK	1926–1928	101	0	107	0	—	—		
Ken Bennett	FW	1950–1953	101	37	107	41	—	—		
Elliott Bennett	DF	2009–2011; 2014	96	13	107	17	—	—	(Note: Norwich City)	
Jack Thompson	FB	1921–1924	94	0	106	0	—	—		
Paul Wood	FW	1987–1990	92	8	105	8	—	—		
Jock Davie	FW	1936–1946	89	39	105	58	—	—		
Adam Lallana	MF	2020–2024	95	3	104	4	England	0		
Paul Reid	MF	2004–2008	94	5	104	6	Australia	0		
Harry Dutton	HB	1929–1932	93	4	104	5	—	—		
Arthur Attwood	FW	1931–1935	87	55	104	75	—	—		
Tommy Fraser	MF	2006–2009	79	2	103	3	—	—		
Tommy Allsopp	FW	1905–1907	72	7	103	11	—	—		
Stan Willemse	FB	1946–1949	91	3	102	4	England B	—		
Andy Ritchie	FW	1980–1983	89	23	102	26	England U21	—		
Tariq Lamptey *	DF	2020–present	88	1	102	2	Ghana; England U21	8		
Hugh McDonald	GK	1906–1908	69	0	102	0	—	—		
Marcos Painter	DF	2010–2013	90	1	100	1	Republic of Ireland U21	—	(Note: Swansea City)	
Bill Hastings	FW	1909–1912	85	11	100	9	—	—		

== Notes ==
Player statistics include matches played while on loan from:

== Sources ==
- Carder, Tim; Harris, Roger (1993). Seagulls! The Story of Brighton & Hove Albion F.C. Hove: Goldstone Books. ISBN 0-9521337-0-9.
- Carder, Tim; Harris, Roger (1997). Albion A–Z: A Who's Who of Brighton & Hove Albion F.C. Hove: Goldstone Books. ISBN 0-9521337-1-7.
- Hugman, Barry J., ed. (1998). The 1998–99 Official PFA Footballers Factfile. Harpenden: Queen Anne Press. ISBN 978-1-85291-588-9.
- Hugman, Barry J., ed. (1999). The 1999–2000 Official PFA Footballers Factfile. Harpenden: Queen Anne Press. ISBN 978-1-85291-607-7.
- Hugman, Barry J., ed. (2002). The PFA Footballers' Who's Who 2002/2003. Harpenden: Queen Anne Press. ISBN 978-1-85291-648-0.
- Hugman, Barry J., ed. (2005). The PFA Footballers' Who's Who 2005–2006. Edinburgh: Mainstream. ISBN 978-1-85291-662-6.
- Hugman, Barry J., ed. (2007). The PFA Footballers' Who's Who 2007–08. Edinburgh: Mainstream. ISBN 978-1-84596-246-3.
- Joyce, Michael (2004). Football League Players' Records 1888 to 1939. Nottingham: SoccerData. ISBN 978-1-899468-67-6.
- Rollin, Glenda; Rollin, Jack, eds. (2010). Sky Sports Football Yearbook 2010–2011. Headline. ISBN 978-0-7553-6107-6.
- Rollin, Jack, ed. (1990). Rothmans Football Yearbook 1990–91. London: Queen Anne Press. ISBN 0-356-17911-7.
- "Brighton". Soccerbase. Centurycomm.
- "Brighton & Hove Albion: 1946/47–2013/14". Post War English & Scottish Football League A–Z Players Database. Neil Brown.
