= Charlie Webb =

English footballer and manager (1886–1973)

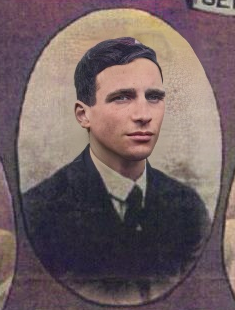
- Pictured in 1921

Personal information
- Full name: Charles Graham Webb
- Date of birth: 4 September 1886
- Place of birth: Curragh Camp, Ireland
- Date of death: 13 June 1973 (aged 86)
- Place of death: Hove, Sussex, England
- Height: 5 ft 8 in (1.73 m)
- Position: Forward

Senior career*
Years	Team	Apps	(Gls)
1902–1908	Worthing		
1906–1908	Essex Regiment		
1908–1909	Bohemians		
1909–1915	Brighton & Hove Albion	248	(73)

International career
1909–1911	Ireland	3	(0)

Managerial career
- 1919–1947: Brighton & Hove Albion
Signature
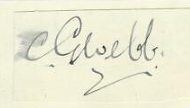
- * Club domestic league appearances and goals

Charles Graham Webb (4 September 1886 – 13 June 1973) was an English association football player who represented his country once as an amateur and three times as a professional. He was employed by English club Brighton & Hove Albion for nearly forty years as player and manager.

== Early life and career ==
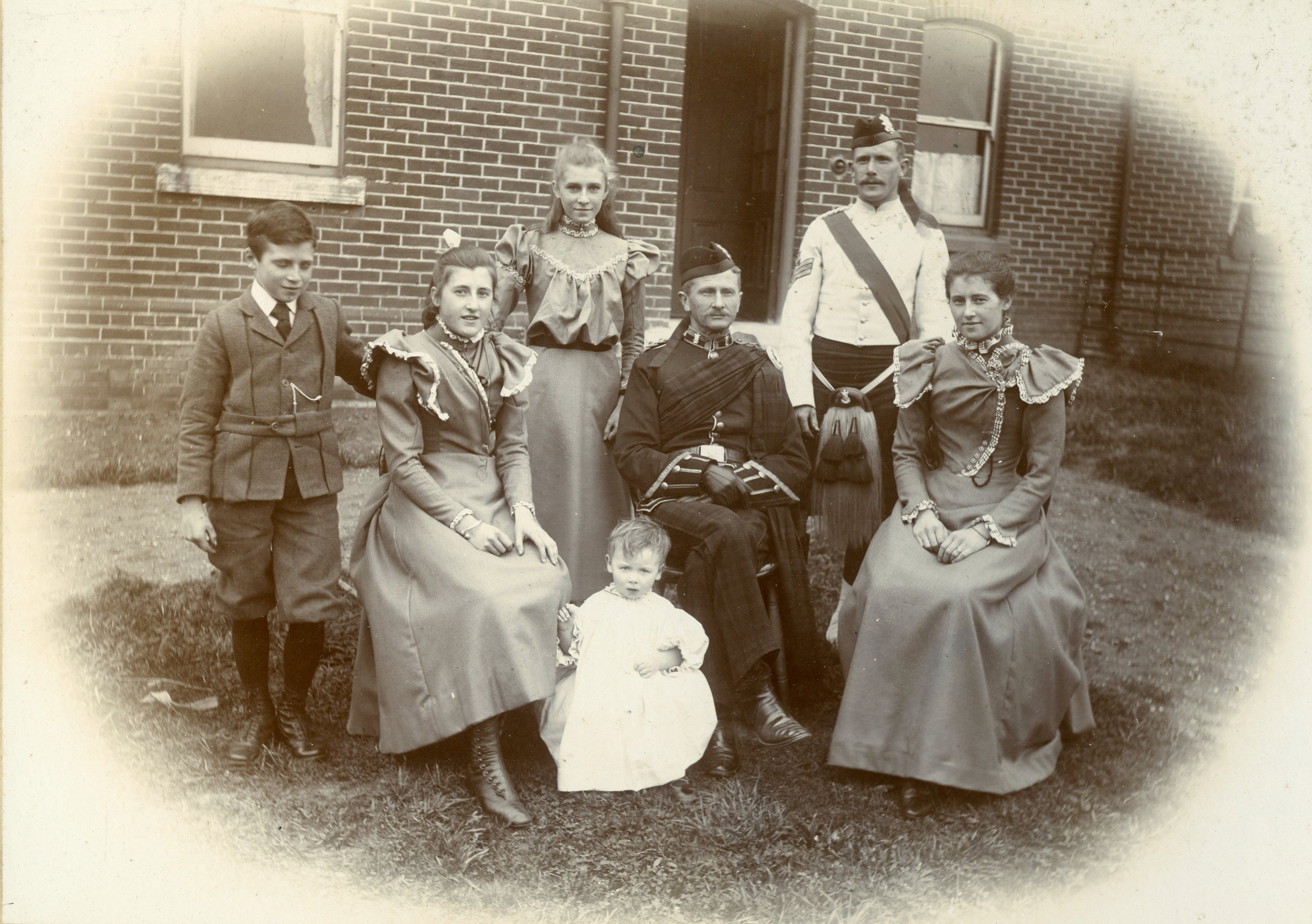
Charles Graham Webb and his Family, circa 1898–1899

Webb was born into an English military family at the Curragh Camp, a military camp in County Kildare, Ireland, where his father, Sergeant William Webb of the Black Watch, was stationed. The family, originally from Northamptonshire, moved around following Sgt Webb's postings so the young Webb spent some of his childhood in Edinburgh Castle before settling in the Worthing, Sussex, area. As a 16-year-old, Webb played first-team football for the town club, Worthing F.C., and in his second season, he contributed to Worthing winning a treble of the Sussex Senior Cup, the West Sussex Senior League, and a local charity cup.

In 1904, Webb followed in the family tradition by enlisting in the 2nd Battalion of the Essex Regiment. His trade in the Army was a clerk, and while serving in Ireland, he furthered his football career playing for his regimental team in the Leinster Senior League, and later, in the Irish Football League for Bohemians. He scored freely for his regiment, in November 1907 he scored all seven in a 7–4 defeat of Dublin University, and early the following year was the only player from outside the Irish League to be selected for the Leinster representative team to play Ulster. He had a trial with Scottish club Rangers in 1908, and later that year was chosen to represent the Irish League in a match against the English League. In November, he was capped by the Ireland amateur national team, in a match against the England amateurs in Dublin. Described by The Times' reporter as "distinctly the best of an indifferent forward line", he scored Ireland's late consolation goal in a 5–1 defeat.

In January 1909, while on Christmas leave from his regiment, Webb played and scored for Brighton & Hove Albion in a Southern League match against West Ham United. On his return, the Army discovered he had appeared alongside professionals and banned him from military football for 12 months. The Football Association fined the Brighton club £5 "for having approached and played Webb in violation of the Rules of the Association." Rumours that the military authorities would prevent him playing for Bohemians in the semifinal of the Irish Cup proved unfounded, but when Webb finished on the winning side, the Irish Times reported that Glentoran, the losing club, intended to protest his inclusion, on the grounds that playing in the Southern League made him ineligible to appear in the Irish Cup competition. The result stood, though by the time the final was played, Webb had left the club. Forced to choose between his military and his football career, he bought himself out of the Army and signed for Albion as an amateur.

== Brighton & Hove Albion ==
A few days later, Webb became the first Brighton player to be capped at full international level when he made his debut for Ireland against Scotland at Ibrox Park on 15 March 1909. Ireland lost 5–0. In his second international match, a week later against Wales in Belfast, Ireland lost 3–2, and Webb had to play the second half out of position at left half because of an injury sustained by English McConnell.

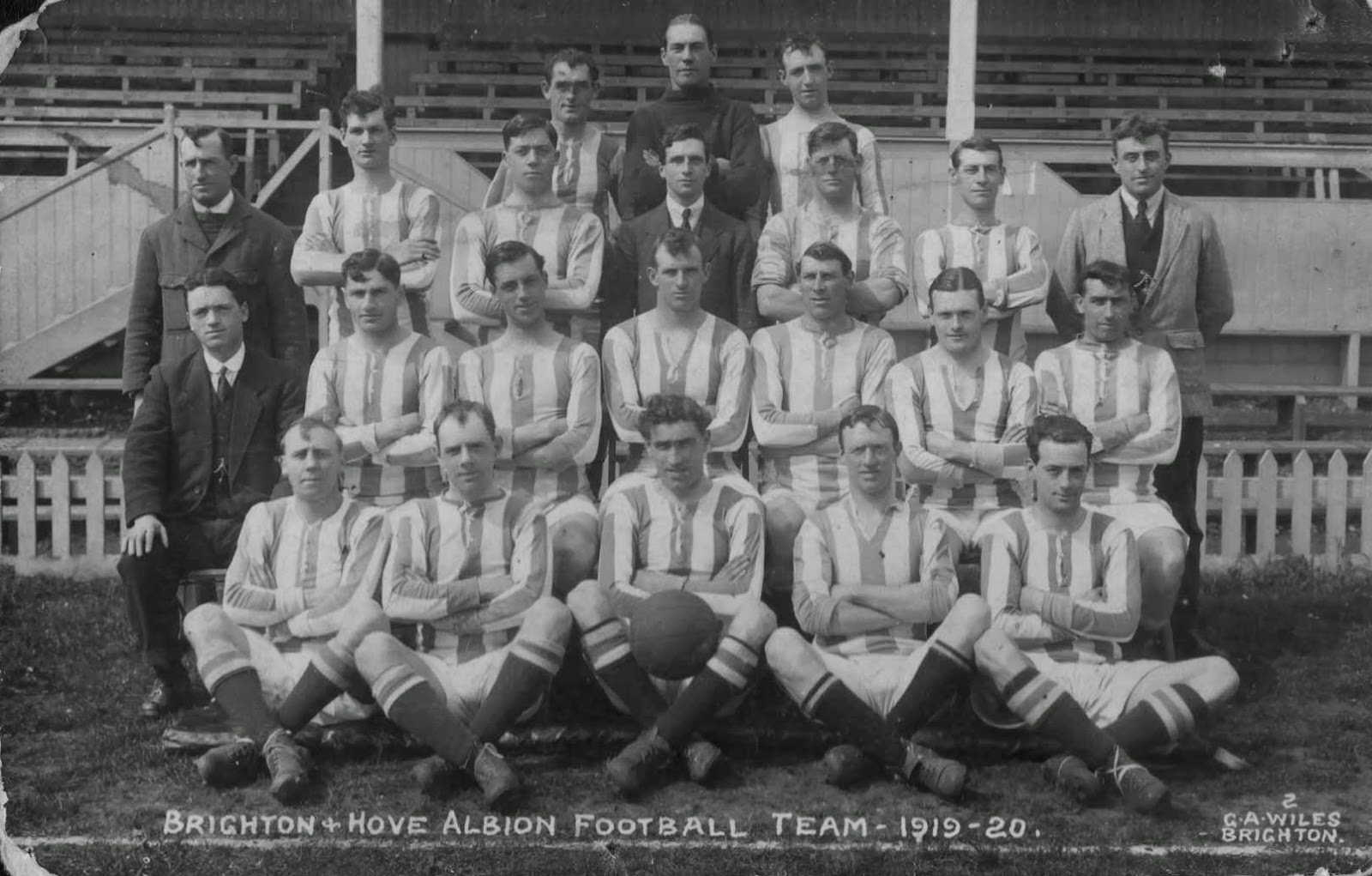
Brighton and Hove Football Team photo circa 1919–20

Called up after Aberdeen's Charlie O'Hagan withdrew from the party selected to play England in 1910, Webb was unable to accept the invitation. His third and last cap came the following year, as replacement for James Macauley; given "one rare chance to open the scoring ... with no one to beat but the goalkeeper", he shot wide as Scotland went on to win 2–0.

I have the feeling the majority of those non-partisan thousands who flocked in were secretly hoping it would be another David and Goliath story.

— Charlie Webb, on the 1910 Charity Shield

At the end of the 1909–10 season, the Times reported that "Brighton and Hove Albion have not had much difficulty in finishing at the head of the Southern League". Webb played in every game as Albion won their first and, as of 2024, only major title. This achievement earned them a place in the FA Charity Shield in which they faced reigning Football League champions Aston Villa at Stamford Bridge in London. The only goal of the game was scored in the second half, following a corner kick taken by Albion's Bert Longstaff. Aston Villa's goalkeeper parried the ball into a knot of players, from where Bill Hastings touched it to Webb, "who cleverly evaded a couple of Villa defenders and found the net with a rising cross-shot." Crowds packed the area around Brighton railway station to welcome the victors home at 11:30 pm, and the Sussex Daily News suggested that the team could "now be dubbed as Champions of England". A testimonial fund raised more than £120 which was distributed among the professional players. As an amateur, Webb could receive no prize money, so the club presented him with a gold tie-pin instead. He turned professional soon afterwards.

He finished as the club's leading scorer in 1912–13, with 13 goals in all competitions, and went on to set a club record for goals scored in the Southern League of 64. Though his Ireland career was at an end, Webb continued to be selected in representative teams. In September 1912, he scored for the Southern League as the Football League XI beat them 2–1 at Old Trafford, Manchester, and the following season, he was selected for a Southern Alliance eleven to play that league's champions, Croydon Common; among his teammates was Patsy Hendren, the England Test cricketer. A serious leg injury sustained in a match against Millwall in November 1914 effectively put an end to his playing career. After his playing days, Webb continued to have a significant impact on football. On match days, all the gate money used to be taken to Frith Road and stored in a safe in the larder because the banks were not open on Saturdays. Webb even sold tickets from the house for cup ties.

In tribute to his immense contribution to the club, the bus number 665 was named after Charlie Webb in January 2020. The name had previously been carried by the Scania Omnidekka bus 615, which was sold in November 2020. The buses served as a nod to Webb's lasting impact on both Brighton and Hove Albion and the community.

== First World War ==
On the outbreak of war, Brighton & Hove Albion supported the war effort by having a rifle range built at the Goldstone Ground. Webb led rifle drill on the pitch, using wooden replicas where there were insufficient actual weapons to go round. He re-enlisted as a second lieutenant in the King's Royal Rifle Corps, and served on the Western Front from July 1917. Promoted to acting captain (the rank was confirmed after the war), he was leading a patrol near Nesle in March 1918 when they were challenged in French. Unfortunately for Webb and his men, the French speakers were German troops. Preferring to avoid unnecessary injury or death, Webb surrendered. He saw out the duration as a prisoner of war in Mainz, Germany. While awaiting repatriation, he received a letter from the chairman of Brighton & Hove Albion offering him the post of team manager, an appointment he took up on his demobilisation in 1919.

== Managerial career ==
The club had closed down during the war, so Webb's first task was not only rebuilding the team but also involving himself with rebuilding the ground. Competition resumed in 1919–20, and the following season, Webb led the team into the Football League as a Third Division was formed largely comprising the Southern League First Division teams of the year before. Awarded a testimonial in recognition of his service to the club, Webb chose the League game against Watford in April 1921 as his benefit match; it attracted more than 10,000 spectators and raised nearly £500. In the 1923–24 FA Cup, Webb led Albion to the fifth round (last 16), defeating First Division Everton on the way in what he later described as "the best Cup exhibition of any Albion team under my management".

He earned a reputation as a sound judge of a player. Immediately after the war, the signing of former England international forward George Holley for a club record £200 fee was viewed as quite a coup. Holley suffered a career-ending injury, so hardly played, but Webb replaced him with Jack Doran who finished as the club's top scorer despite joining halfway through the season. He brought Tommy Cook through from the juniors into the first team; Cook was top scorer in three seasons, but when he left the club to concentrate on his cricket career, Webb brought in the Queens Park Rangers reserve Hugh Vallance, who turned out to be a "goalscoring phenomenon" alongside Dan Kirkwood.

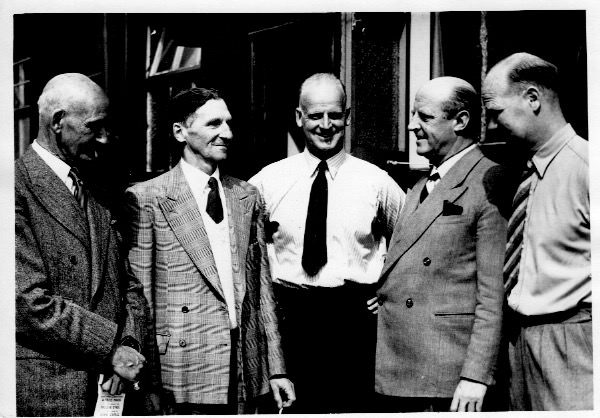
Charles Graham Webb and the Brighton and Hove Albion board of directors, circa 1930s

Again, when twice top scorer Arthur Attwood succumbed to appendicitis in 1933, Webb signed former Norwich City centre-forward Oliver "Buster" Brown who had failed to break into the first team at West Ham United with regular football at Albion, Brown produced 41 goals in his first two seasons.

Between the wars, Webb's teams finished in the top five of the Third Division South on ten occasions, but challenged seriously for promotion only in the latter half of the 1930s. He led the team to third place in 1936–37, despite an uneasy relationship with the club's board, the supporters, and the press. The board came under criticism for alleged interference in team affairs, having undue influence over the manager in pressing the claims for selection of one player over another. Letters to the local press suggested that Webb should "be allowed greater freedom", while in the Evening Argus, the pseudonymous "Crusader"'s "vitriolic attacks on the directors and management of Brighton and Hove Albion for their alleged lack of ambition and inept team selections ... generated a massive readership response" and led to "near physical confrontations with Charlie Webb, the beleaguered manager and former Albion player, despite the team usually finishing in a respectable position in the League table." The club's relationship with the local newspaper worsened during the 1937–38 season, to the extent that "Crusader" was "either banned by the directors or was voluntarily taken off by [the editor]". Webb himself told the Daily Express: "Here you have a town full of people with money, yet hardly one of them will give us a hand. Without attractive new players and a winning team you can't get gates and without gates you can't have money."

Nevertheless, the national press recognised his achievements. A Daily Mirror feature in 1939 compared him to George Allison of Arsenal and Frank Buckley of Wolverhampton Wanderers,

but where some think and act in thousands of pounds, Charles is compelled to do the same in pence, and the consistently good football of Brighton is a tribute in itself ... His great knowledge of the game has saved his club money in the way of transfer fees, and the reserve team is composed entirely of players found by him, costing not a penny. Even the first team cost very little, the highest fee paid being £50, and yet Brighton have been keen fighters for promotion for the past three seasons.

A Guardian retrospective on the club, written in 1973, described how "Brighton had a skilful team usually playing to the top six" under Webb, "whose transfer acquisitions were as often as not costed on the price of his train ticket and buffet sandwiches".

== Second World War and after ==
No longer of an age for active service, Webb joined the Home Guard during the war. Albion continued to compete in the various wartime leagues, and Webb skilfully exploited the regulations allowing players to make guest appearances for the club nearest to their base. He was particularly fortunate that the King's Liverpool Regiment's posting to Newhaven in 1941 gave him the pick of Liverpool F.C.'s pre-war team. In their absence, he was reduced to selecting youngsters or soliciting members of the crowd to make up the numbers, as at Norwich City at Christmas 1940, when his travelling party of one senior player and three amateurs was supplemented by Jimmy Ithell of Bolton Wanderers, Norwich City juniors and local servicemen; Albion lost 18–0. At the end of the 1946–47 season, at the age of 60, Webb handed over responsibility for team affairs to former player Tommy Cook, remaining with the club on the administrative side, as secretary and general manager. A few days after a 4–0 home defeat to Walsall left Albion at the bottom of the table, provoking a demonstration after the match, the directors appointed Don Welsh as secretary-manager. Webb stayed on until the end of the 1947–48 season to assist his successor, then left the club and retired from football.

Such was Webb's standing in the game that he was awarded a second testimonial. In September 1949, Portsmouth, reigning Football League title-holders, though unable to field a full first team because "[their] dressing-room [was] like a hospital", beat Arsenal, their predecessors as champions, by two goals to one in "an exhibition of memorable football" at the Goldstone Ground. After his retirement, he wrote a regular column in the Sussex Daily News. Webb continued living in the Frith Road house until shortly before his death in a Hove nursing home in 1973, at the age of 86. A tree was planted opposite the ground in his memory.

== Personal life, character and legacy ==
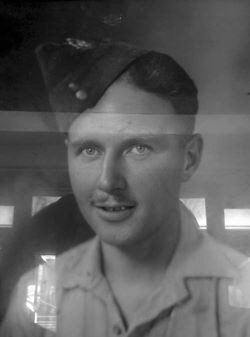
Kenneth Graham Webb, picture taken in the 1940s

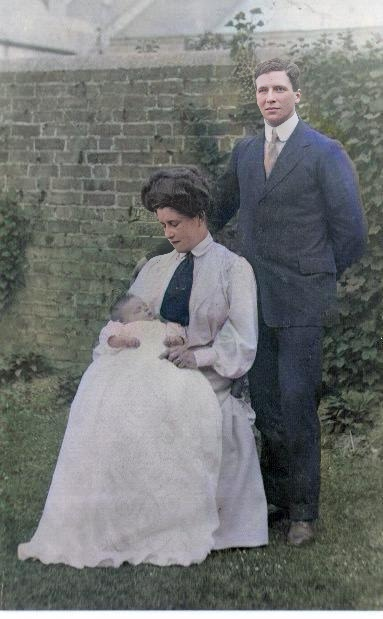
Charlie Webb and Minnie Gertrude Benn with baby Joyce, circa 1910–1911

Webb was married to Minnie Gertrude Benn for over 60 years. The couple had two children, Kenneth and Joyce. Kenneth, who was married to his wife Doreen, had worked for the local newspaper Evening Argus, but was killed during the Second World War. He was aboard an Avro Lancaster III bomber when it was shot down while attempting to attack a V1 rocket launch site at La Nieppe.

Charles and Minnie's daughter, Joyce was born on the same day as the 1910 Charity Shield, and their son Kenneth was born in 1916 and died in August 1944. Joyce outlived her parents, and Joyce appeared on screen at the football club's centenary celebration, during which her father was honored as one of 24 legends profiled in the commemorative publication. In 2003, she further commemorated her family's history by unveiling a memorial plaque on their former home on Frith Road.

According to Jess Willard, one of Webb's post-Second World War signings, "everybody called him Mr Webb because he was a perfect gentleman". A 1929 feature on the club in the Sussex County Magazine spoke of him as "one of the most dominating personalities associated with the club", discharging his managerial duties "with such conspicuous success" while remaining "genial and popular with directors, players and public alike".

== Statistics ==
Brighton & Hove Albion playing statistics by season and competition
Season	Southern League		FA Cup		Charity Shield		Western League		Western League Championship Game		Southern Alliance		Southern Professional Charity Cup		Total	
Season	Apps	Goals	Apps	Goals	Apps	Goals	Apps	Goals	Apps	Goals	Apps	Goals	Apps	Goals	Apps	Goals
1908–09	15	5	0	0	0	0	1	0	2	0	0	0	2	0	20	5
1909–10	42	9	1	0	0	0	0	0	0	0	0	0	3	0	46	9
1910–11	33	14	3	0	1	1	0	0	0	0	0	0	5	1	42	16
1911–12	38	17	1	0	0	0	0	0	0	0	0	0	3	1	42	18
1912–13	37	10	3	1	0	0	0	0	0	0	13	2	0	0	53	13
1913–14	36	9	4	2	0	0	0	0	0	0	13	7	1	0	54	18
1914–15	18	0	0	0	0	0	0	0	0	0	0	0	0	0	18	0
Total	219	64	12	3	1	1	1	0	2	0	26	9	14	2	275	79

Managerial statistics by competition
Competition	P	W	D	L	GF	GA	Win %
Football League	840	361	191	288	1,329	1,128	42.98
Southern League	42	14	8	20	60	72	33.33
FA Cup	77	37	17	23	156	104	48.05
Third Division South Cup	13	4	3	6	21	23	30.77
Totals	972	416	219	337	1,566	1,337	42.80

== Bibliography ==
- Camillin, Paul & Weir, Stewart (2001). Albion – The first 100 years. Brighton: Pavilion. ISBN 0-9532045-0-2.
- Carder, Tim & Harris, Roger (1997). Albion A–Z: A Who's Who of Brighton & Hove Albion F.C. Hove: Goldstone Books. ISBN 0-9521337-1-7.
- Carder, Tim & Harris, Roger (1993). Seagulls! The Story of Brighton & Hove Albion F.C. Hove: Goldstone Books. ISBN 0-9521337-0-9.
- Hounsome, Robert (2006). The very nearly man: an autobiography. Leicester: Troubador. ISBN 1-905237-72-3.
- Vinicombe, John (1978). Albion: An illustrated history of Brighton & Hove Albion F.C. Norwich: George Nobbs.
- Source of Kenneth Graham Webb (Charles's child)
