= Stan Risdon =

English footballer (1913–1979)

Personal information
- Full name: Stanley William Risdon
- Date of birth: 13 August 1913
- Place of birth: Exeter, England
- Date of death: 2 August 1979 (aged 65)
- Place of death: Hove, England
- Height: 5 ft 11 in (1.80 m)
- Position: Utility player

Senior career*
Years	Team	Apps	(Gls)
- Tipton St John
- St Mary's Majors
1933–1936	Exeter City	35	(1)
1936–1948	Brighton & Hove Albion	23	(0)
1948–1954	Hastings United		
1954–19??	Bexhill Town Athletic (player-coach)		
- * Club domestic league appearances and goals

Stanley William Risdon (13 August 1913 – 2 August 1979) was an English professional footballer who played in a variety of positions in the Football League for Exeter City and Brighton & Hove Albion.

== Life and career ==
Risdon was born in 1913 in Exeter, Devon. He played minor football for Tipton St John and St Mary Majors before joining Exeter City, initially as an amateur, in 1933. Playing at inside right and then at right half, Risdon made 35 appearances in the Third Division South by the end of the 1935–36 season, but refused the offer of another season, and signed for division rivals Brighton & Hove Albion.

Never a regular in Albion's league side, Risdon made only 23 first-team appearances, mainly playing as a defender, before the Second World War put a stop to competitive football. He was able to play regularly for the club throughout the war, and made his final appearances for the first team in the 1946–47 season. As a benefit, the proceeds of three league matches in 1948 and 1949 were shared between Risdon and four other long-serving players, Len Darling, Ernie Marriott, Bert Stephens and Joe Wilson.

Risdon joined the newly formed Southern League club Hastings United in 1948. He remained with Hastings United for six years, and received a benefit from them as well, before becoming player-coach of Sussex County League club Bexhill Town Athletic.

He died in Hove, Sussex, in 1979 at the age of 65.

== Career statistics ==
Appearances and goals by club, season and competition
Club	Season	League			FA Cup		Other		Total	
Club	Season	Division	Apps	Goals	Apps	Goals	Apps	Goals	Apps	Goals
Brighton & Hove Albion	1936–37	Third Division South	3	0	0	0	1 (Note: Appearances in Third Division South Cup)	0	4	0
Brighton & Hove Albion	1937–38	Third Division South	17	0	0	0	1	1	18	1
Brighton & Hove Albion	1938–39	Third Division South	1	0	0	0	0	0	1	0
Brighton & Hove Albion	1945–46	—			9	0	—		9	0
Brighton & Hove Albion	1946–47	Third Division South	2	0	1	0	—		3	0
Brighton & Hove Albion	1947–48	Third Division South	0	0	0	0	—		0	0
Brighton & Hove Albion	Total		23	0	10	0	2	1	35	1
Career total			23	0	10	0	2	1	35	1
