= Joe McGhie =

Joe McGhie may refer to:

- Joe McGhie (Australian footballer) (born 1947), Australian rules footballer
- Joe McGhie (footballer, born 1884) (1884–1976), Scottish footballer
