= Jack Haworth (footballer, born 1887) =

English footballer

Personal information
- Full name: John Houghton Haworth
- Date of birth: 1887
- Place of birth: Turton, England
- Date of death: 29 October 1967 (aged 79)
- Positions: Left half; right back

Senior career*
Years	Team	Apps	(Gls)
191?–1909	Turton		
1909–1912	Brighton & Hove Albion	81	(7)
1912–19??	Middlesbrough	61	(0)
- * Club domestic league appearances and goals

John Houghton Haworth (1887 – 29 October 1967) was an English professional footballer who played at left half or right back. He made 61 Football League appearances for Middlesbrough, and was a member of the Brighton & Hove Albion team that won the 1909–10 Southern League title and the 1910 FA Charity Shield.

== Life and career ==
Haworth was born in 1887 in Turton, Lancashire, to John James Haworth and his wife Isabella. The 1901 Census records the 13-year-old Haworth still living with his family in Turton and working as a packer of cotton cloth at the local dyeworks.

He began his football career with his local team, Turton of the Lancashire Combination. He was recommended to Brighton & Hove Albion by Brighton's captain, Joe Leeming, who also came from the Turton area. Haworth turned professional with Brighton in late 1909, helped them win the 1909–10 Southern League title, and played in the team that beat the Football League champions, Aston Villa, to win the 1910 FA Charity Shield. He attracted attention from Football League clubs, and signed for Middlesbrough in February 1912 for a fee of £600. He made 61 First Division appearances before competitive football was abandoned for the duration of the First World War.

In September 1915, Haworth enlisted in the Royal Engineers as a blacksmith and served in France. He married Florence Cannon in 1915, and died in 1967 at the age of 79.
