= Billy Booth (footballer) =

English footballer

Personal information
- Full name: William Booth
- Date of birth: 9 May 1886
- Place of birth: Sheffield, England
- Date of death: 1963 (aged 76)
- Place of death: Brighton, England
- Position: Centre half

Senior career*
Years	Team	Apps	(Gls)
–1907	Thorpe Hesley Parish Church		
1907–1908	Sheffield United	1	(0)
1908–1920	Brighton & Hove Albion	303	(8)
1920–1921	Castleford Town		
- Worthing

International career
	Southern League XI	7	
- * Club domestic league appearances and goals

William Booth (9 May 1886 – 1963) was an English professional footballer who played as a centre half in the Football League for Sheffield United. He made 369 appearances for Brighton & Hove Albion and was a member of the team that won the 1909–10 Southern League First Division championship and the 1910 FA Charity Shield. Booth was a non-playing reserve for England in February 1913.

== Personal life ==
Booth served as a private in the Football Battalion of the Middlesex Regiment during the First World War. He died in Brighton in 1963 at the age of 76.

== Honours ==
Brighton & Hove Albion

- Southern League First Division: 1909–10
- FA Charity Shield: 1910
