= Bob Whiting =

English footballer

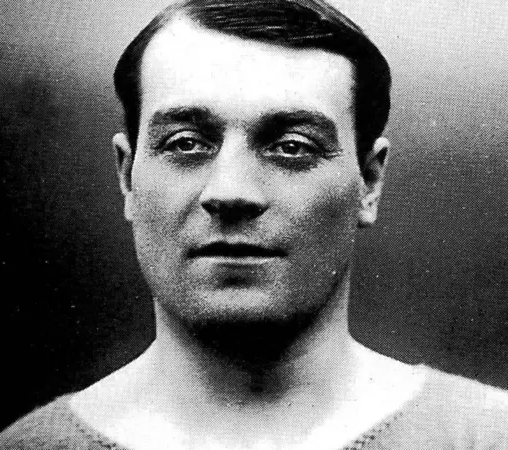

Personal information
- Full name: Robert Whiting
- Date of birth: 6 January 1883
- Place of birth: Canning Town, England
- Date of death: 28 April 1917 (aged 34)
- Place of death: Oppy Wood, Arras, France
- Position: Goalkeeper

Senior career*
Years	Team	Apps	(Gls)
1904–1905	South West Ham		
1905	West Ham United	0	(0)
1905–1906	Tunbridge Wells Rangers		
1906–1908	Chelsea	52	(0)
1908–1915	Brighton & Hove Albion	253	(0)
- * Club domestic league appearances and goals

Robert Whiting (6 January 1883 – 28 April 1917), sometimes known as Pom Pom Whiting, was an English professional footballer who played as a goalkeeper in the Football League for Chelsea. He made 253 appearances in the Southern League for Brighton & Hove Albion and was a part of the club's 1909–10 Southern League First Division and 1910 FA Charity Shield-winning teams.

== Career ==
Whiting was given the nickname "Pom Pom" due to the strength of his kicks.

In December 1914, four months after the outbreak of the First World War, Whiting enlisted in the Football Battalion of the Middlesex Regiment. After arriving in France in November 1915, Whiting became infected with scabies at the front and was sent to a hospital in Brighton for treatment. As a result of the discovery of his wife's pregnancy and the death of his brother on the Somme in August 1916, Whiting went AWOL. After 133 days he was caught in October 1916 and court-martialled in France in February 1917. A shortage of men due to the Battle of the Somme and Hubert Gough's need for men in the Battle of Arras meant that his sentence of 9 months' hard labour lasted just one week before he rejoined the Football Battalion. He was killed in action whilst assaulting a fortified German position at Oppy Wood during the battleon 28 April 1917 and is commemorated on the Arras Memorial.

After Whiting's death it was rumored that he was shot for desertion. His commanding officer wrote a letter published by The Argus which debunked these claims.

== Personal life ==
Whiting married Sarah "Nellie" Whiting, with whom he had three sons. His second-youngest son, William, later followed in his footsteps to play as a goalkeeper for Tunbridge Wells Rangers.

== Career statistics ==
Appearances and goals by club, season and competition
Club	Season	League			FA Cup		Total	
Club	Season	Division	Apps	Goals	Apps	Goals	Apps	Goals
Chelsea	1905–06	Second Division	1	0	0	0	1	0
Chelsea	1906–07	Second Division	36	0	2	0	38	0
Chelsea	1907–08	First Division	15	0	0	0	1	0
Chelsea	Total		52	0	2	0	54	0
Brighton & Hove Albion	1908–09	Southern League First Division	37	0	1	0	38	0
Brighton & Hove Albion	1909–10	Southern League First Division	42	0	1	0	43	0
Brighton & Hove Albion	1910–11	Southern League First Division	37	0	3	0	40	0
Brighton & Hove Albion	1911–12	Southern League First Division	38	0	1	0	39	0
Brighton & Hove Albion	1912–13	Southern League First Division	34	0	3	0	37	0
Brighton & Hove Albion	1913–14	Southern League First Division	34	0	4	0	38	0
Brighton & Hove Albion	1914–15	Southern League First Division	31	0	0	0	31	0
Brighton & Hove Albion	Total		253	0	13	0	266	0
Career total			305	0	15	0	32	0

== Honours ==
Brighton & Hove Albion

- Southern League First Division: 1909–10
- FA Charity Shield: 1910

== Works cited ==
- Furber, Simon; Lo, Hsin-Yi (9 November 2025). "The tragic tale of a footballer who served in WW1". BBC. Archived from the original on 11 December 2025.
