= 2005–06 FA Cup =

Tournament details
- Country: England; Wales
- Teams: 674

Final positions
- Champions: Liverpool (7th title)
- Runners-up: West Ham United

Tournament statistics
- Top goal scorer(s): Neil Danns; Paul Hayes; Steve Basham (5 goals each)

The 2005–06 FA Cup was the 125th staging of the world's oldest football competition, the FA Cup.

The competition began on 20 August 2005, with the lowest-ranked of the 674 entrants competing in the Extra preliminary round. For the top 44 clubs, the FA Cup began in the third round in January.

Ties are all single-legged and take place at the stadium of the club drawn first. If scores are level at the end of a match, it is replayed at the away club's stadium, usually 10 days later. If the scores are still level, extra-time and penalties (if necessary) are used to determine a winner. However, from the semi-finals onwards, the ties take place at a neutral stadium, and there are no replays. That is to say, extra-time and penalties are played if necessary to determine a winner in a single match.

At the special request of England national team manager Sven-Göran Eriksson, the quarter-finals (i.e., 6th round proper) were held on weeknights (they would normally take place at weekends). This action was made to ensure that the season finishes as early as possible, allowing players a full month's rest before the 2006 World Cup finals.

The semi-finals were staged at neutral venues and, like the final, would not be replayed in the event of a draw.

The Football Association had hoped to stage the final at the newly rebuilt Wembley Stadium, London on 13 May 2006, but due to the uncertainty of the new stadium being completed in time, the Millennium Stadium in Cardiff hosted the final, which was contested between Liverpool and West Ham United.

== Calendar ==
Round	Date	Matches	Clubs	Byes	Prize money
Extra preliminary round	Saturday 20 August 2005	86	674 → 588	none	£500
Preliminary round	Saturday 27 August 2005	182	588 → 406	278: 225th-502nd	£1,000
First round qualifying	Saturday 10 September 2005	124	406 → 282	66: 159th-224th	£2,250
Second round qualifying	Saturday 24 September 2005	84	282 → 198	44: 115th-158th	£3,750
Third round qualifying	Saturday 8 October 2005	42	198 → 156	none	£5,000
Fourth round qualifying	Saturday 22 October 2005	32	156 → 124	22: 93rd-114th	£10,000
First round proper	Saturday 5 November 2005	40	124 → 84	48: 45th-92nd	£16,000
Second round proper	Saturday 3 December 2005	20	84 → 64	none	£24,000
Third round proper	Saturday 7 January 2006	32	64 → 32	44: 1st-44th	£40,000
Fourth round proper	Saturday 28 January 2006	16	32 → 16	none	£60,000
Fifth round proper	Saturday 18 February 2006	8	16 → 8	none	£120,000
Sixth round proper	Wednesday 22 March 2006	4	8 → 4	none	£300,000
Semi-finals	Saturday 22 April 2006	2	4 → 2	none	£900,000
Final	Saturday 13 May 2006	1	2 → 1	none	£1,000,000

== Qualifying rounds ==
All participating clubs that were not members of the Premier League or Football League entered the competition in the qualifying rounds to secure one of 32 places available in the first round proper.

The winners from the fourth qualifying round were Harrogate Town, Tamworth, Southport, Burscough, Chasetown, Northwich Victoria, York City, Leamington, Worcester City, Hednesford Town, Burton Albion, Halifax Town, Morecambe, Hereford United, Braintree Town, Kettering Town, Burnham, Welling United, Aldershot Town, Histon, Grays Athletic, Nuneaton Borough, Stevenage Borough, Woking, Chippenham Town, Merthyr Tydfil, Cambridge City, Folkestone Invicta, Ramsgate, Dagenham & Redbridge, Weymouth and Eastbourne Borough.

Chasetown, Braintree Town, Burnham, Eastbourne Borough and Folkestone Invicta were appearing in the competition proper for the first time, with Invicta being the first club from Folkestone to feature at this stage since Folkestone F.C. in 1982-83. Of the others, Weymouth had last qualified for the first round in 1985–86, Leamington had last done so in 1983-84 (although the club had been inactive from 1988-2000), Burscough had last done so in 1980-81, Ramsgate had last done so in 1955-56 and Chippenham Town had last done so in 1951-52.

== First round proper ==
All ties took place on the weekend of Saturday 5 November 2005. Replays, played in the week of 14 November 2005, are shown in italics. Ties are shown in order of the draw.

Step 9 sides Chasetown and Leamington, from the Midland Alliance, were the lowest-ranked teams in the round.

Tie no	Home team	Score	Away team	Attendance
1	Nottingham Forest (3)	1–1	Weymouth (6)	10,305
replay	Weymouth (6)	0–2	Nottingham Forest (3)	6,500
2	Southport (5)	1–1	Woking (5)	1,417
replay	Woking (5)	0–0	Southport (5)	2,298
Woking won 1–0 after extra time
3	Bristol City (3)	0–2	Notts County (4)	4,221
4	Burnham (8)	1–3	Aldershot Town (5)	1,623
5	Rochdale (4)	0–1	Brentford (3)	2,928
6	Eastbourne Borough (6)	1–1	Oxford United (4)	3,770
replay	Oxford United (4)	3–0	Eastbourne Borough (6)	4,396
7	Merthyr Tydfil (7)	1–2	Walsall (3)	3,046
8	Hartlepool United (3)	2–1	Dagenham & Redbridge (5)	3,655
9	Bradford City (3)	2–1	Tranmere Rovers (3)	6,116
10	Barnet (4)	0–1	Southend United (3)	3,545
11	Peterborough United (4)	0–0	Burton Albion (5)	3,857
replay	Burton Albion (5)	1–0	Peterborough United (4)	2,511
12	Cheltenham Town (4)	1–0	Carlisle United (4)	2,405
13	Histon (6)	4–0	Hednesford Town (6)	1,080
14	York City (5)	0–3	Grays Athletic (5)	3,586
15	Swindon Town (3)	2–2	Boston United (4)	3,814
replay	Boston United (4)	4–1	Swindon Town (3)	2,467
16	Chasetown (9)	1–1	Oldham Athletic (3)	1,997
replay	Oldham Athletic (3)	4–0	Chasetown (9)	7,235
17	AFC Bournemouth (3)	1–2	Tamworth (5)	4,559
18	Chester City (4)	2–1	Folkestone Invicta (7)	2,503
19	Kettering Town (6)	1–3	Stevenage Borough (5)	4,548
20	Nuneaton Borough (6)	2–0	Ramsgate (8)	2,153
21	Huddersfield Town (3)	4–1	Welling United (6)	5,578
22	Cambridge City (6)	0–1	Hereford United (5)	1,116
23	Port Vale (3)	2–1	Wrexham (4)	5,046
24	Halifax Town (5)	1–1	Rushden & Diamonds (4)	2,303
replay	Rushden & Diamonds (4)	0–0	Halifax Town (5)	2,133
0–0 after extra time — Rushden & Diamonds won 5–4 on penalties
25	Barnsley (3)	1–0	Darlington (4)	6,059
26	Torquay United (4)	1–1	Harrogate Town (6)	2,079
replay	Harrogate Town (6)	0–0	Torquay United (4)	3,317
0–0 after extra time — Torquay United won 6–5 on penalties
27	Doncaster Rovers (3)	4–1	Blackpool (3)	4,332
28	Shrewsbury Town (4)	4–1	Braintree Town (7)	2,969
29	Bury (4)	2–2	Scunthorpe United (3)	2,940
replay	Scunthorpe United (3)	0–0	Bury (4)	4,006
Scunthorpe United won 1–0 after extra time
30	Morecambe (5)	1–3	Northwich Victoria (6)	2,166
31	Burscough (7)	3–2	Gillingham (3)	1,927
32	Stockport County (4)	2–0	Swansea City (3)	2,978
33	Macclesfield Town (4)	1–1	Yeovil Town (3)	1,943
replay	Yeovil Town (3)	4–0	Macclesfield Town (4)	4,456
34	Chippenham Town (7)	1–1	Worcester City (6)	
replay	Worcester City (6)	1–0	Chippenham Town (7)	4,006
35	Wycombe Wanderers (4)	1–3	Northampton Town (4)	3,974
36	Grimsby Town (4)	1–2	Bristol Rovers (4)	2,680
37	Rotherham United (3)	3–4	Mansfield Town (4)	4,089
38	Colchester United (3)	9–1	Leamington (9)	3,513
39	Lincoln City (4)	1–1	Milton Keynes Dons (3)	3,508
replay	Milton Keynes Dons (3)	2–1	Lincoln City (4)	4,029
40	Leyton Orient (4)	0–0	Chesterfield (3)	3,554
replay	Chesterfield (3)	1–2	Leyton Orient (4)	4,895

== Second round proper ==
The 40 clubs to have made it through the first round, play off to reduce the number of remaining clubs to 20.

All ties took place between Friday 2 and Sunday 4 December 2005. Replays took place on 13 December. Ties are shown in order of the draw.

Burscough, from the Northern Premier League Premier Division, was the lowest-ranked team in the round.

Tie no	Home team	Score	Away team	Attendance
1	Walsall (3)	2 – 0	Yeovil Town (3)	4,580
2	Woking (5)	0 – 0	Northwich Victoria (6)	2,462
replay	Northwich Victoria (6)	2 – 1	Woking (5)	2,302
3	Burton Albion (5)	4 – 1	Burscough (7)	4,499
4	Aldershot Town (5)	0 – 1	Scunthorpe United (3)	3,584
5	Shrewsbury Town (4)	1 – 2	Colchester United (3)	3,695
6	Hartlepool United (3)	1 – 2	Tamworth (5)	3,786
7	Cheltenham Town (4)	1 – 1	Oxford United (4)	4,592
replay	Oxford United (4)	1 – 2	Cheltenham Town (4)	3,455
8	Mansfield Town (4)	3 – 0	Grays Athletic (5)	2,992
9	Hereford United (5)	0 – 2	Stockport County (4)	3,620
10	Stevenage Borough (5)	2 – 2	Northampton Town (4)	3,937
replay	Northampton Town (4)	2 – 0	Stevenage Borough (5)	4,407
11	Port Vale (3)	1 – 1	Bristol Rovers (4)	4,483
replay	Bristol Rovers (4)	0 – 1	Port Vale (3)	5,623
12	Boston United (4)	1 – 2	Doncaster Rovers (3)	3,995
13	Rushden & Diamonds (4)	0 – 1	Leyton Orient (4)	3,245
14	Nuneaton Borough (6)	2 – 2	Histon (6)	3,366
replay	Histon (6)	1 – 2	Nuneaton Borough (6)	3,077
15	Oldham Athletic (3)	1 – 1	Brentford (3)	4,365
replay	Brentford (3)	1 – 0	Oldham Athletic (3)	3,146
16	Southend United (3)	1 – 2	Milton Keynes Dons (3)	5,267
17	Worcester City (6)	0 – 1	Huddersfield Town (3)	4,163
18	Torquay United (4)	2 – 1	Notts County (4)	2,407
19	Barnsley (3)	1 – 1	Bradford City (3)	7,051
replay	Bradford City (3)	3 – 5	Barnsley (3)	4,738
20	Chester City (4)	3 – 0	Nottingham Forest (3)	4,732

== Third round proper ==
The 20 clubs to have made it through Round Two meet the 24 clubs from the Football League Championship and the 20 Premier League clubs, including holders Arsenal.

All ties took place on Saturday 7 and Sunday 8 January 2006. Replays took place on 17 and 18 January, and are shown in italics. Ties are shown in order of the draw.

One of the most significant games of the round, if not the entire competition, was the goalless draw between Premier League giants Manchester United and Conference National underdogs Burton Albion in the first match at the Pirelli Stadium. However, United were in no mood for unpleasant surprises in the replay at Old Trafford and easily overcame Albion 5-0.

Conference North sides Northwich Victoria and Nuneaton Borough were the lowest-ranked teams in the draw.

Tie no	Home team	Score	Away team	Attendance
1	West Bromwich Albion (1)	1–1	Reading (2)	19,197
replay	Reading (2)	2–2	West Bromwich Albion (1)	16,737
Reading win 3–2 after extra time
2	Fulham (1)	1–2	Leyton Orient (4)	13,394
3	Brighton & Hove Albion (2)	0–1	Coventry City (2)	6,734
4	Wolverhampton Wanderers (2)	1–0	Plymouth Argyle (2)	11,041
5	Port Vale (3)	2–1	Doncaster Rovers (3)	4,923
6	Sheffield Wednesday (2)	2–4	Charlton Athletic (1)	14,851
7	Torquay United (4)	0–0	Birmingham City (1)	5,974
replay	Birmingham City (1)	2–0	Torquay United (4)	24,650
8	Manchester City (1)	3–1	Scunthorpe United (3)	27,779
9	Newcastle United (1)	1–0	Mansfield Town (4)	41,459
10	Luton Town (2)	3–5	Liverpool (1)	10,170
11	Preston North End (2)	2–1	Crewe Alexandra (2)	8,380
12	Stoke City (2)	0–0	Tamworth (5)	9,366
replay	Tamworth (5)	1–1	Stoke City (2)	3,812
1–1 after extra time, Stoke win 5 – 4 on penalties
13	Derby County (2)	2–1	Burnley (2)	12,713
14	Southampton (2)	4–3	Milton Keynes Dons (3)	15,908
15	Blackburn Rovers (1)	3–0	Queens Park Rangers (2)	12,705
16	Arsenal (1)	2–1	Cardiff City (2)	36,552
17	Stockport County (4)	2–3	Brentford (3)	4,078
18	Norwich City (2)	1–2	West Ham United (1)	23,968
19	Ipswich Town (2)	0–1	Portsmouth (1)	15,593
20	Wigan Athletic (1)	1–1	Leeds United (2)	10,980
replay	Leeds United (2)	2–2	Wigan Athletic (1)	15,243
3–3 after extra time, Wigan win 4 – 2 on penalties
21	Sunderland (1)	3–0	Northwich Victoria (6)	19,329
22	Chelsea (1)	2–1	Huddersfield Town (3)	41,650
23	Cheltenham Town (4)	2–2	Chester City (4)	4,741
replay	Chester City (4)	0–1	Cheltenham Town (4)	5,096
24	Leicester City (2)	3–2	Tottenham Hotspur (1)	19,844
25	Watford (2)	0–3	Bolton Wanderers (1)	13,239
26	Sheffield United (2)	1–2	Colchester United (3)	11,820
27	Nuneaton Borough (6)	1–1	Middlesbrough (1)	6,000
replay	Middlesbrough (1)	5–2	Nuneaton Borough (6)	26,255
28	Hull City (2)	0–1	Aston Villa (1)	17,051
29	Barnsley (3)	1–1	Walsall (3)	6,884
replay	Walsall (3)	2–0	Barnsley (3)	4,074
30	Burton Albion (5)	0–0	Manchester United (1)	6,191
replay	Manchester United (1)	5–0	Burton Albion (5)	53,564
31	Crystal Palace (2)	4–1	Northampton Town (4)	10,391
32	Millwall (2)	1–1	Everton (1)	16,440
replay	Everton (1)	1–0	Millwall (2)	25,800

== Fourth round proper ==
This round featured the 32 clubs to have made it through Round Three.

All ties took place on Saturday 28 and Sunday 29 January 2006. Replays took place on 7 and 8 February, and are shown in italics. Ties are shown in order of the draw.

League Two sides Cheltenham Town and Leyton Orient were the lowest-ranked teams in the round.

Tie no	Home team	Score	Away team	Attendance
1	Stoke City (2)	2–1	Walsall (3)	8,834
2	Cheltenham Town (4)	0–2	Newcastle United (1)	7,022
3	Coventry City (2)	1–1	Middlesbrough (1)	28,120
replay	Middlesbrough (1)	1–0	Coventry City (2)	14,131
4	Reading (2)	1–1	Birmingham City (1)	23,762
replay	Birmingham City (1)	2–1	Reading (2)	16,644
5	Portsmouth (1)	1–2	Liverpool (1)	17,247
6	Leicester City (2)	0–1	Southampton (2)	20,427
7	Bolton Wanderers (1)	1–0	Arsenal (1)	13,326
8	Aston Villa (1)	3–1	Port Vale (3)	30,434
9	Brentford (3)	2–1	Sunderland (1)	11,698
10	Manchester City (1)	1–0	Wigan Athletic (1)	30,811
11	Everton (1)	1–1	Chelsea (1)	29,742
replay	Chelsea (1)	4–1	Everton (1)	39,301
12	Preston North End (2)	1–1	Crystal Palace (2)	9,489
replay	Crystal Palace (2)	1–2	Preston North End (2)	7,356
13	West Ham United (1)	4–2	Blackburn Rovers (1)	23,700
14	Colchester United (3)	3–1	Derby County (2)	5,933
15	Charlton Athletic (1)	2–1	Leyton Orient (4)	22,029
16	Wolverhampton Wanderers (2)	0–3	Manchester United (1)	28,333

== Fifth round proper ==
Initial matches were played on Saturday 18 and Sunday 19 February 2006. Replays are shown in italics, and took place on 14 and 15 March. Ties are shown in order of the draw. All eight ties were won by Premier League clubs, with League One sides Colchester United and Brentford being the lowest-ranked teams participating.

Liverpool's 1-0 win over Manchester United ended their arch rivals' hopes of an FA Cup/League Cup double, as well as ending Liverpool's 85-year wait for a win over Manchester United in an FA Cup tie.

Tie no	Home team	Score	Away team	Attendance
1	Preston North End (2)	0–2	Middlesbrough (1)	19,877
2	Newcastle United (1)	1–0	Southampton (2)	40,975
3	Aston Villa (1)	1–1	Manchester City (1)	23,847
replay	Manchester City (1)	2–1	Aston Villa (1)	33,006
4	Chelsea (1)	3–1	Colchester United (3)	41,810
5	Charlton Athletic (1)	3–1	Brentford (3)	22,098
6	Liverpool (1)	1–0	Manchester United (1)	44,039
7	Bolton Wanderers (1)	0–0	West Ham United (1)	17,120
replay	West Ham United (1)	2–1	Bolton Wanderers (1)	24,685
8	Stoke City (2)	0–1	Birmingham City (1)	18,768

== Sixth round proper ==
The most significant game of the round was undoubtedly Liverpool's 7-0 win at Birmingham City, one of the biggest ever scorelines in an FA Cup quarter-final tie.

This was a rare occurrence in which all eight quarter-finalists were members of the top flight.

23 March 2006

Charlton Athletic (1)	0–0	Middlesbrough (1)
	Report

The Valley, London
Attendance: 24,187
Referee: Mike Dean (Wirral)

20 March 2006

Manchester City (1)	1–2	West Ham United (1)
Musampa 84'	Report	Ashton 40', 68'

City of Manchester Stadium, Manchester
Attendance: 39,357
Referee: Howard Webb (South Yorkshire)

22 March 2006

Chelsea (1)	1–0	Newcastle United (1)
Terry 3'	Report

Stamford Bridge, London
Attendance: 42,279
Referee: Steve Bennett (Kent)

21 March 2006

Birmingham City (1)	0–7	Liverpool (1)
	Report	Hyypiä 1'; Crouch 4', 37'; Morientes 59'; Riise 69'; Tébily 76' (o.g.); Cissé 88'

St Andrew's, Birmingham
Attendance: 27,378
Referee: Rob Styles (Hampshire)

=== Replays ===
12 April 2006

Middlesbrough (1)	4–2	Charlton Athletic (1)
Rochemback 10'; Morrison 25'; Hasselbaink 72'; Viduka 76'	Report	Hughes 12'; Southgate 75' (o.g.)

Riverside Stadium, Middlesbrough
Attendance: 30,248
Referee: Phil Dowd (Staffordshire)

== Semi-finals ==
Chelsea's hopes of the league title and FA Cup double were ended as they lost 2–1 to Liverpool, while Middlesbrough's defeat to West Ham United ended their hopes of an FA Cup/UEFA Cup double.

West Ham's victory meant that they would be contesting their first FA Cup final for 26 years, with this victory coming just five days after the death of John Lyall, manager of the West Ham side that had won the cup that year.

22 April 2006

Chelsea (1)	1–2	Liverpool (1)
Drogba 69'	Report	Riise 20'; García 52'

Old Trafford, Manchester
Attendance: 64,575

23 April 2006

Middlesbrough (1)	0–1	West Ham United (1)
	Report	Harewood 77'

Villa Park, Birmingham
Attendance: 39,148

== Final ==
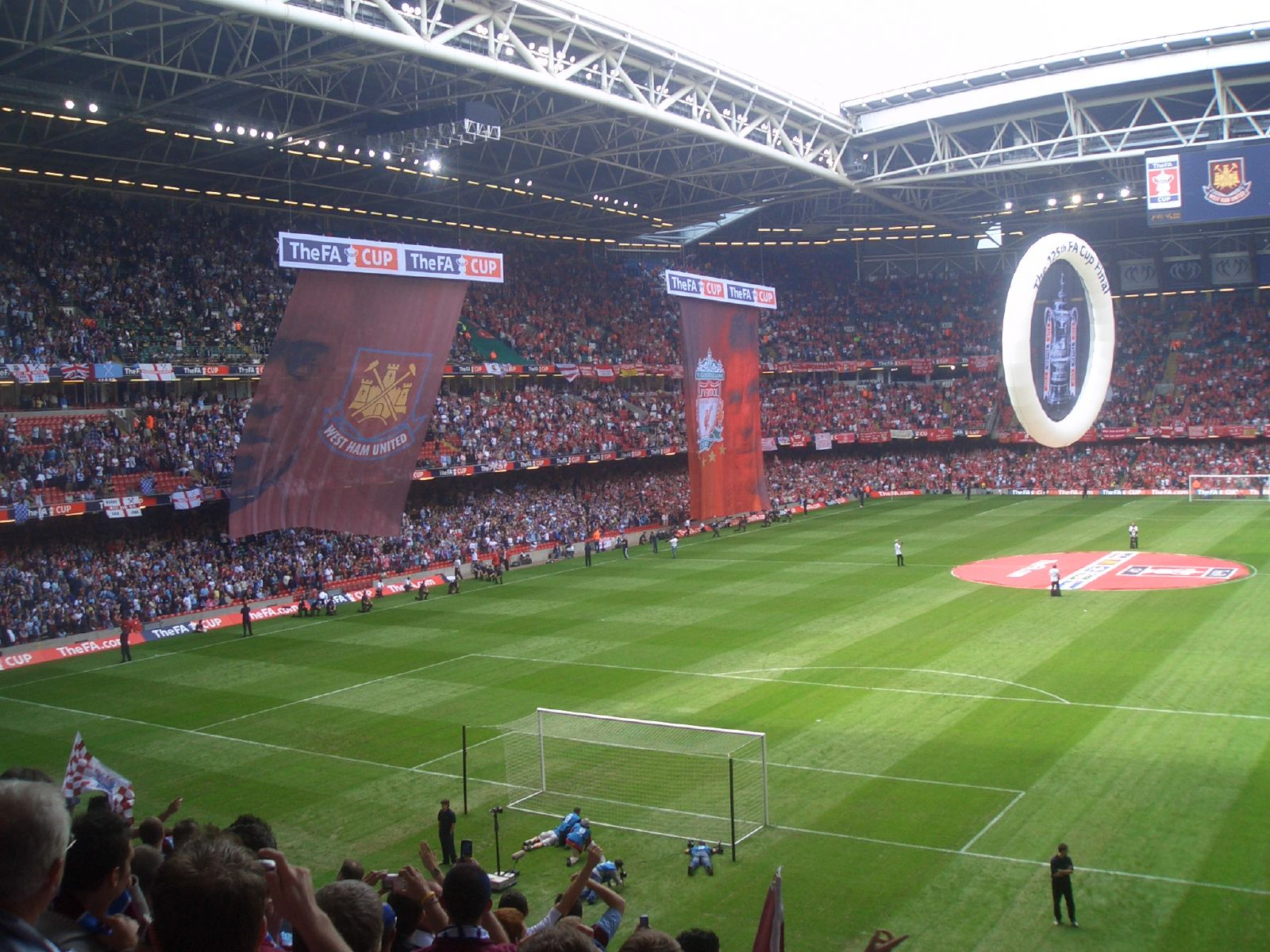
Liverpool vs West Ham United before the FA Cup Final at the Millennium Stadium.

In the final, an injury-time equaliser by Liverpool's Steven Gerrard forced a 3–3 draw, and his side went on to win the penalty shoot-out and secure the seventh FA Cup triumph of their history. West Ham's Alan Pardew was the first Englishman to manage an FA Cup finalist side since Aston Villa's John Gregory six years earlier.

13 May 2006
15:00 BST

Liverpool	3–3 (a.e.t.)	West Ham United
Cissé 34'; Gerrard 54', 90+1'	(Report)	Carragher 21' (o.g.); Ashton 28'; Konchesky 64'
Penalties
Hamann (penalty scored); Hyypiä (penalty missed); Gerrard (penalty scored); Riise (penalty scored)	3–1	(penalty missed) Zamora; (penalty scored) Sheringham; (penalty missed) Konchesky; (penalty missed) Ferdinand

Millennium Stadium, Cardiff
Attendance: 71,140
Referee: Alan Wiley (Staffordshire)

Liverpool	West Ham

== Top scorers ==
As of 13 May 2006

Rank	Player	Club	Goals
1	(Nigeria) Yakubu	Middlesbrough	4
1	(England) Steven Gerrard	Liverpool	4
3	(England) Dean Ashton	West Ham United	3
3	(Czech Republic) Milan Baroš	Aston Villa	3
3	(England) Dudley Campbell	Brentford	3
3	(England) Peter Crouch	Liverpool	3
3	(Guyana) Neil Danns	Colchester United	3
3	(Finland) Mikael Forssell	Birmingham City	3
3	(England) Robbie Fowler	Manchester City	3
3	(Netherlands) Jimmy Floyd Hasselbaink	Middlesbrough	3
3	(England) Kevin James	Walsall	3
3	(England) Leroy Lita	Reading	3
3	(England) Gez Murphy	Nuneaton Town	3
3	(England) Kieran Richardson	Manchester United	3
3	(Norway) John Arne Riise	Liverpool	3

== Player of the Round ==
From the first round (qualifying) onward, a panel including Sky Sports' Jeff Stelling and FA Chief Executive Brian Barwick nominated players for the award. The winners were voted by visitors of thefa.com.

The player with the most votes each round won £1000 worth of football equipment for a local school or club, as well as an engraved silver salver.

Round	Player	Club
First round qualifying	Jamie Laidlaw	Gosport Borough
Second round qualifying	Paul Brayson	Northwich Victoria
Third round qualifying	Alex Rodman	Leamington
Fourth round qualifying	Stuart Tuck	Eastbourne Borough
First round proper	Paul Brayson	Northwich Victoria
Second round proper	Dave Mulligan	Doncaster Rovers
Third round proper	Gez Murphy	Nuneaton Borough
Fourth round proper	Ricardo Gardner	Bolton Wanderers
Fifth round proper	Jamie Carragher	Liverpool
Sixth round proper	Steven Gerrard	Liverpool
Semi-finals	Luis García	Liverpool

No vote was made for the final tie.

== See also ==
- 2006 FA Cup Final

== Media coverage ==
In the United Kingdom, the BBC were the free to air broadcasters for the fifth consecutive season while Sky Sports were the subscription broadcasters for the eighteenth consecutive season.

The matches shown live on the BBC were:

Chasetown 1-1 Oldham Athletic (R1)

Worcester City 0-1 Huddersfield Town (R2)

Hull City 0-1 Aston Villa (R3)

Luton Town 3-5 Liverpool (R3)

Leicester City 3-2 Tottenham Hotspur (R3)

Manchester United 5-0 Burton Albion (R3 Replay)

Cheltenham Town 0-2 Newcastle United (R4)

Bolton Wanderers 1-0 Arsenal (R4)

Portsmouth 1-2 Liverpool (R4)

Chelsea 4-1 Everton (R4 Replay)

Liverpool 1-0 Manchester United (R5)

Newcastle United 1-0 Southampton (R5)

Aston Villa 1-1 Manchester City (R5)

West Ham United 2-1 Bolton Wanderers (R5 Replay)

Manchester City 1-2 West Ham United (QF)

Chelsea 1-0 Newcastle United (QF)

Charlton Athletic 0-0 Middlesbrough (QF)

Middlesbrough 4-2 Charlton Athletic (QF Replay)

Chelsea 1-2 Liverpool (SF)

Liverpool 3-3 West Ham United (Final)

The matches shown live on Sky Sports were:

Merthyr Tydfil 1-2 Walsall (R1)

Weymouth 0-2 Nottingham Forest (R1 Replay)

Mansfield Town 3-0 Grays Athletic (R2)

Brentford 1-0 Oldham Athletic (R2 Replay)

Burton Albion 0-0 Manchester United (R3)

Leeds United 3-3 Wigan Athletic (R3 Replay)

Wolverhampton Wanderers 0-3 Manchester United (R4)

Birmingham City 2-1 Reading (R4 Replay)

Chelsea 3-1 Colchester United (R5)

Manchester City 2-1 Aston Villa (R5 Replay)

Birmingham City 0-7 Liverpool (QF)

Middlesbrough 0-1 West Ham United (SF)

Liverpool 3-3 West Ham United (Final)

== Sources and external links ==
- Official site; fixtures and results service at TheFA.com
- News and stories at BBC.co.uk
- Results service at SoccerBase.com
