= English McConnell =

Irish footballer

English McConnell (14 May 1883 – 13 June 1928) was an Irish footballer who played for Sunderland, Chelsea and Ireland as a wing half.

== Club career ==
McConnell started his footballing career with Irish side, Cliftonville in 1902 before signing for Glentoran, where he won the Irish League Championship in the 1904–05 season; he made 26 appearances while with Glentoran, scoring a single goal. McConnell then signed for English team, Sunderland, in 1905, and made his debut on 28 October, 1905, against Blackburn Rovers in a 3–0 win at Roker Park. He played for Sunderland from 1905 to 1908 and made 39 league appearances, scoring no goals. He then signed for Sheffield Wednesday in 1908, making his debut against Leicester City on 1 September, 1908, and went on to make 44 league appearances. McConnell scored no goals until being signed by Chelsea in 1910.

He signed for Chelsea for £1,000, but only stayed at the club for two seasons before moving to South Shields after making just 21 appearances, with no goals for Chelsea. McConnell stayed at South Shields from 1911 to 1912 before moving back to Ireland, with Linfield and won the Irish League Championship in the 1913–14 season, he played out the rest of his career with Linfield until it was halted by the First World War. He died in 1928.

== International career ==
McConnell gained his first international cap for Ireland on 21 March 1904 against Wales, with Ireland winning the match 1–0. He made 11 further appearances.
