= Bert Longstaff =

English footballer

Personal information
- Full name: Albert Edward Longstaff
- Date of birth: 9 October 1885
- Place of birth: Shoreham, Sussex, England
- Date of death: July 1970 (aged 84)
- Place of death: Brighton, Sussex, England
- Height: 5 ft 8 in (1.73 m)
- Positions: Outside right; inside right

Senior career*
Years	Team	Apps	(Gls)
1902–1906	Shoreham		
1906–1922	Brighton & Hove Albion	356	(63)
1924–1925	Shoreham		
- * Club domestic league appearances and goals

Albert Edward Longstaff (9 October 1885 – July 1970) was an English professional footballer who played at outside right or inside right.

He started his career at Shoreham when he was 17. In 1907 he signed with Brighton & Hove Albion. He stayed with Brighton until 1922, during which time he won the 1909–10 Southern League title and the 1910 FA Charity Shield and played in the club's first year in the Football League Third Division South, in 1921–22, which was his last season with the club. He scored 86 goals from 443 appearances in all senior competitions.

After he left Brighton he got permission from the Football Association to play as an amateur again for Shoreham, where he finished his footballing career.

His younger brother Harvey played Southern League football for Albion.
