= George Coomber =

British association football player (1890-1960)

George Coomber (Note: The player's birth surname was Comber, but throughout his football career he was referred to as Coomber.)
Personal information
- Full name: George Stephen Comber
- Date of birth: 19 January 1890
- Place of birth: West Hoathly, England
- Date of death: 6 March 1960 (aged 70)
- Place of death: Hove, England
- Position: Half back

Senior career*
Years	Team	Apps	(Gls)
- Tottenham Thursday
1912	Tottenham Hotspur	0	(0)
19??–1913	Tufnell Park		
1913–1924	Brighton & Hove Albion	243	(5)
- * Club domestic league appearances and goals

George Stephen Comber (19 January 1890 – 6 March 1960), generally known as George Coomber, was an English professional footballer who made 168 Football League appearances playing as a half back for Brighton & Hove Albion.

== Life and career ==
Coomber was born in West Hoathly, Sussex, and attended St Martin's School, Brighton, before beginning a glass-blowing apprenticeship in London. There he began his football career with Tottenham Thursday, Tufnell Park and Tottenham Hotspur – though not for their first team – before returning home in 1913 to sign as an amateur for Brighton & Hove Albion, then of the Southern League. He appeared intermittently in 1913–14, turned professional at the end of the season, and soon established himself in the side. During the war, he served in the Army and made guest appearances for clubs including Tottenham Hotspur and Watford. He resumed his place in the Albion team and was a regular for the five years following the war, which included the club's first four seasons in the Football League. He captained the team from December 1922 until his career was ended by injury in 1924. Coomber used the proceeds of a benefit match to set up a construction company. He died in Hove in 1960 at the age of 70.
