= Ted Martin (footballer) =

English footballer

Personal information
- Full name: Edward Martin
- Date of birth: 15 May 1910
- Place of birth: Greasley, England
- Date of death: January 1990 (aged 79)
- Place of death: Selston, England
- Height: 5 ft 8 in (1.73 m)
- Position: Left back

Senior career*
Years	Team	Apps	(Gls)
1926–19??	Selston Amateurs		
19??–1932	Heanor Town		
1932–1946	Brighton & Hove Albion	155	(4)
- * Club domestic league appearances and goals

Edward Martin (15 May 1910 – January 1990) was an English professional footballer who made 155 Football League appearances playing as a left back for Brighton & Hove Albion.

== Life and career ==
Martin was born in Greasley, Nottinghamshire. He played for Selston Amateurs and Heanor Town and had an unsuccessful trial with West Bromwich Albion before signing for Brighton & Hove Albion of the Football League Third Division South in September 1932. He was a first-team regular in the last four seasons before the Football League was suspended for the duration of the Second World War, and helped Albion finish as runners-up in 1938–39. Martin served in the Army, and made guest appearances for Portsmouth and Bournemouth before resuming his Albion career in the 1945–46 FA Cup. He played no more league football through injury, and went on to work as an electrician in a Nottinghamshire colliery.

Martin died in Selston, Nottinghamshire, in 1990 at the age of 79.
