= Glen Wilson (footballer) =

English footballer and manager

Personal information
- Full name: Glenton Edward Wilson
- Date of birth: 2 July 1929
- Place of birth: Winlaton, England
- Date of death: 8 November 2005 (aged 76)
- Place of death: Brighton, England
- Height: 5 ft 9 in (1.75 m)
- Position: Left half

Youth career
- 1945–194?: Newcastle United

Senior career*
Years	Team	Apps	(Gls)
194?–1949	Newcastle United	0	(0)
1949–1960	Brighton & Hove Albion	409	(25)
1960–1962	Exeter City	36	(2)
Total		445	(27)

Managerial career
- 1960–1962: Exeter City (player-manager)
- 1964-1965: Whitehawk
- * Club domestic league appearances and goals

Glenton Edward Wilson (2 July 1929 – 8 November 2005) was an English professional footballer who played as a left half. He made 445 appearances in the Football League, most of which were with Brighton & Hove Albion.

== Life and career ==
Wilson was born in 1929 in Winlaton, which was then in County Durham. He attended High Spen Senior School and was capped by England at schoolboy level during the Second World War. He joined Newcastle United in 1945, but was soon called up for National Service with the REME based in Hampshire. While there, he was spotted by Brighton & Hove Albion and turned professional with that club in September 1949. His older brother Joe had recently come to the end of a long playing career with Albion and was on the coaching staff.

Wilson made his debut later that month, became a regular in the side during the 1950–51 season, and remained a regular for the next ten years. He was rated highly enough to represent the Third Division South three times in the annual fixture against the Northern Section, and attracted interest from the likes of Arsenal and Aston Villa. He captained Albion to the 1957–58 Third Division South title and played on for two seasons in the Second Division before joining Exeter City as player-manager in June 1960. The club struggled both on and off the pitch, and Wilson's tenure lasted less than two seasons.

He and wife Joan returned to Brighton where they ran a pub. He initially managed Whitehawk, before he rejoined Albion's backroom staff in 1966. He was briefly caretaker manager in October 1973, and was on the staff until a cost-cutting exercise ended his career in 1986. He remained in the Brighton area, where he died of a heart attack in 2005 at the age of 76.
