= Ernie King (footballer, born 1907) =

English footballer

Personal information
- Full name: Ernest William King
- Date of birth: 25 November 1907
- Place of birth: Brockley, England
- Date of death: 2001 (aged 93)
- Place of death: Dorset, England
- Height: 6 ft 2 in (1.88 m)
- Position: Full back

Senior career*
| Years | Team | Apps | (Gls) |
- Wyke Sports
- Weymouth
| 1928–1931 | West Bromwich Albion | 0 | (0) |
| 1931–1938 | Brighton & Hove Albion | 196 | (0) |
- * Club domestic league appearances and goals

Ernest William King (25 November 1907 – 2001) was an English professional footballer who made 196 Football League appearances playing as a full back for Brighton & Hove Albion in the 1930s.

== Life and career ==
King was born in Brockley, London. He played non-league football in Dorset before joining West Bromwich Albion, initially as an amateur, in 1928. He turned professional the following year, and played for the club's reserves, but not for the first team, and moved on to Brighton & Hove Albion in 1931. He was a regular in the side from 1932 to 1937, playing in either full-back position, but suffered an injury in October 1937 that forced his retirement. He went on to keep a hotel in Weymouth, and died in Dorset in 2001 at the age of 93.
