= Reg Smith (footballer, born 1903) =

English footballer

Personal information
- Full name: Redvers Smith
- Date of birth: 1 December 1903
- Place of birth: Rotherham, England
- Height: 5 ft 9 in (1.75 m)
- Position: Full back

Senior career*
Years	Team	Apps	(Gls)
19??–1923	Scunthorpe & Lindsey United		
1923–1931	Brighton & Hove Albion	143	(1)
1932–193?	Shoreham		
- * Club domestic league appearances and goals

Redvers Smith (1 December 1903 – after 1932), commonly known as Reg Smith, was an English professional footballer who made 143 Football League appearances playing as a full back for Brighton & Hove Albion.

== Life and career ==
Smith was born in Rotherham, which was then in the West Riding of Yorkshire. He played for Midland League club Scunthorpe & Lindsey United before joining Brighton & Hove Albion in 1923. Although the team had considerable strength at full back during the 1920s, Smith averaged 20 league matches a season for the seven seasons he spent in the first team, and was appointed captain for 1929–30. An injury early in that campaign effectively ended his professional career, although he remained on the club's books until 1931. He then played amateur football for Shoreham.
