= Jack Woodhouse =

English footballer

Personal information
- Full name: John Woodhouse
- Date of birth: 5 December 1888
- Place of birth: Smethwick, England
- Date of death: 1958 (aged 69)
- Place of death: Hendon, England
- Position: Right half

Senior career*
| Years | Team | Apps | (Gls) |
| –1912 | Cheddleton Asylum | | |
| 1912–1924 | Brighton & Hove Albion | 202 | (16) |

International career
| 1920 | FA XI | | |
- * Club domestic league appearances and goals

John Woodhouse (5 December 1888 – 1958) was an English professional footballer who played as a right half in the Southern League and the Football League for Brighton & Hove Albion. He was called up to play for the FA XI on a tour of South Africa in 1920.

== Personal life ==
Woodhouse served as a private with the 17th and 13th Battalions of the Middlesex Regiment during the First World War. At the time of his enlistment, he was living in Hove with his wife.

== Career statistics ==
Appearances and goals by club, season and competition
| Club | Season | League | | | FA Cup | | Total | |
| Club | Season | Division | Apps | Goals | Apps | Goals | Apps | Goals |
|---|---|---|---|---|---|---|---|---|
| Brighton & Hove Albion | 1912–13 | Southern League First Division | 8 | 4 | 0 | 0 | 8 | 4 |
| Brighton & Hove Albion | 1913–14 | Southern League First Division | 15 | 2 | 0 | 0 | 15 | 2 |
| Brighton & Hove Albion | 1914–15 | Southern League First Division | 26 | 3 | 3 | 0 | 29 | 3 |
| Brighton & Hove Albion | 1919–20 | Southern League First Division | 36 | 7 | 1 | 0 | 37 | 7 |
| Brighton & Hove Albion | 1920–21 | Third Division | 42 | 0 | 3 | 0 | 45 | 0 |
| Brighton & Hove Albion | 1921–22 | Third Division South | 37 | 0 | 3 | 0 | 40 | 0 |
| Brighton & Hove Albion | 1922–23 | Third Division South | 36 | 0 | 5 | 0 | 41 | 0 |
| Brighton & Hove Albion | 1923–24 | Third Division South | 2 | 0 | 0 | 0 | 2 | 0 |
| Career total | | | 202 | 16 | 15 | 0 | 217 | 16 |
