= Wally Little (footballer) =

English footballer

Personal information
- Full name: Walter James Little
- Date of birth: 10 November 1897
- Place of birth: Southall, England
- Date of death: 15 August 1976 (aged 78)
- Place of death: Exeter, England
- Height: 5 ft 8 in (1.73 m)
- Positions: Left back; left half

Senior career*
Years	Team	Apps	(Gls)
1919–1929	Brighton & Hove Albion	308	(32)
1929–1930	Clapton Orient	24	(0)
- * Club domestic league appearances and goals

Walter James Little (10 November 1897 – 15 August 1976) was an English professional footballer who made 309 appearances in the Football League playing as a left back or left half for Brighton & Hove Albion and Clapton Orient.

== Life and career ==
Little was born in Southall, Middlesex. He signed for Brighton & Hove Albion, then a Southern League club, in September 1919 after his demobilisation from the Army. He established himself as a first-team regular in the 1922–23 season, by which time Albion were playing in the Football League Third Division South, after switching from left back to left half, and by the time he left the club in 1929 had made 332 appearances in first-team competition. He scored 36 goals, most of which were penalties. He finished his career with a season at another Southern Section club, Clapton Orient. Little died in Exeter, Devon, in 1976 at the age of 78.
