= Tim McCoy (footballer) =

English footballer (1921–2005)

Personal information
- Full name: Wilfred McCoy
- Date of birth: 4 March 1921
- Place of birth: Birmingham, England
- Date of death: 27 January 2005 (aged 83)
- Place of death: Brighton, England
- Height: 6 ft 0 in (1.83 m)
- Position: Centre half

Senior career*
Years	Team	Apps	(Gls)
1946–1948	Portsmouth	18	(0)
1948–1951	Northampton Town	60	(0)
1951–1954	Brighton & Hove Albion	112	(0)
1954–195?	Tonbridge		
195?–1958	Dover		
1958–19??	East Grinstead		
- * Club domestic league appearances and goals

Wilfred "Tim" McCoy (4 March 1921 – 27 January 2005) was an English professional footballer who made 184 Football League appearances playing as a centre half for Portsmouth, Northampton Town and Brighton & Hove Albion.

== Life and career ==
McCoy was born in Birmingham in 1921. He was nicknamed Tim, after the Western film star Tim McCoy, and was generally known by that name. His football career appeared to have ended prematurely when the outbreak of the Second World War and a call-up to the Army prevented him from taking up a trial with Bolton Wanderers. However, when he was posted to Preston Barracks in Brighton, he appeared in wartime matches for Brighton & Hove Albion in the 1940–41 season.

After the war, he signed for First Division club Portsmouth. As backup to Reg Flewin, he made just 18 league appearances in two and a half seasons, and moved on to Northampton Town. He captained the team, and helped them finish as Third Division South runners-up in 1949–50. In January 1951, he returned to Brighton & Hove Albion where he was a regular in the team for nearly three years. He left at the end of the 1933–34 season, and went on to play non-league football for Tonbridge, Dover and as player-coach of East Grinstead.

He then worked as a representative of an electrical appliances company and lived in the Woodingdean area of Brighton. He died in the city in 2005 at the age of 83.
