= Eric Gill (footballer) =

English footballer (born 1930)

Personal information
- Full name: Eric Norman Gill
- Date of birth: 3 November 1930 (age 95)
- Place of birth: Camden, England
- Height: 5 ft 10 in (1.78 m)
- Position: Goalkeeper

Senior career*
Years	Team	Apps	(Gls)
1948–1952	Charlton Athletic	1	(0)
- → Tonbridge (loan)
1952–1960	Brighton & Hove Albion	280	(0)
1960–1966	Guildford City	225	(0)
- * Club domestic league appearances and goals

Eric Norman Gill (born 3 November 1930) is an English former professional footballer who played as a goalkeeper in the Football League for Charlton Athletic and Brighton & Hove Albion, where he spent the majority of his career. He then spent six years with Guildford City of the Southern League.

== Life and career ==
Gill was born in Camden, London. He joined Charlton Athletic in 1948 at the age of 17, but was unable to dislodge Sam Bartram from the first team, and appeared only once for the first team. During his National Service with the Royal Army Ordnance Corps, Gill played Army football, and was spotted by Brighton & Hove Albion manager Billy Lane, who signed him for a £400 fee. He soon established himself in the team, and set a club record of 247 consecutive senior appearances between February 1953 and February 1958. The run, equalling the Football League record for goalkeeping appearances set by Tottenham Hotspur's Ted Ditchburn, was only ended by an attack of influenza. Gill kept goal for the Brighton team that won the 1957–58 Third Division South title, and remained with the club for another two seasons, by which time Dave Hollins had taken over first-team duties. He then made another 225 appearances in the Southern League for Guildford City. He and his wife, Ida, ran a hotel in Brighton while he was still playing for the club, and he continued in that trade after his retirement from football.
