= 1910 FA Charity Shield =

- Event: FA Charity Shield
Brighton and Hove Albion	Aston Villa
(Southern Football League)	(The Football League)
1	0
- Date: 5 September 1910
- Venue: Stamford Bridge, London
- Attendance: 13,000

The 1910 FA Charity Shield was the third Charity Shield, a football match contested by the winners of the previous season's Football League and Southern League competitions. The match was played on 5 September 1910 between 1909–10 Football League winners Aston Villa and 1909–10 Southern League champions Brighton and Hove Albion. The match was played at Stamford Bridge, London, and ended with a 1–0 win for Brighton and Hove Albion. The goal was scored by Charlie Webb, an amateur, with 18 minutes of play remaining.

In the five years that the Charity Shield was contested by the winners of the Football League and Southern League between 1908 and 1912, this was the only occasion on which the Southern League champions prevailed. The victory remains Brighton and Hove Albion's only national honour to date and they were crowned the 'Champions of all England’.

== Match details ==
5 September 1910

Brighton and Hove Albion	1–0	Aston Villa
Webb 72'

Stamford Bridge, London
Attendance: 13,000

Brighton and Hove Albion
Aston Villa

GK	1	(England) Bob Whiting
RB	2	(England) Fred Blackman
LB	3	(England) Joe Leeming
RH	4	(England) Billy Booth
CH	5	(Scotland) Joe McGhie
LH	6	(England) Jack Haworth
OR	7	(England) Bert Longstaff
IR	8	(England) Jimmy Coleman
CF	9	(England) Bullet Jones
IL	10	(Ireland) Charlie Webb
OL	11	(England) Bill Hastings
Manager:
(England) Jack Robson

GK	1	(England) Arthur Cartlidge
RB	2	(England) Tommy Lyons
LB	3	(England) Freddie Miles
RH	4	(England) George Tranter
CH	5	(England) Chris Buckley
LH	6	(England) George Hunter
OR	7	(England) Charlie Wallace
IR	8	(England) Joe Walters
CF	9	(England) Billy Gerrish
IL	10	(England) Joe Bache
OL	11	(England) Bert Hall
Manager:
(Scotland) George Ramsay
