= Reg Wilkinson =

English footballer

Personal information
- Full name: Reginald George Wilkinson
- Date of birth: 26 March 1899
- Place of birth: Norwich, England
- Date of death: 14 September 1946 (aged 47)
- Place of death: Norwich, England
- Height: 5 ft 8 in (1.73 m)
- Position: Wing half

Youth career
- 1915–1920: CEYMS

Senior career*
Years	Team	Apps	(Gls)
1920–1923	Norwich City	102	(7)
1923–1924	Sunderland	2	(0)
1924–1934	Brighton & Hove Albion	361	(14)
1934–1935	Frost's Athletic		
1935–193?	Norwich Electricity Works		
- * Club domestic league appearances and goals

Reginald George Wilkinson (26 March 1899 – 14 September 1946) was an English professional footballer who played as a wing half for Sunderland.
