= Stuart Tuck =

English footballer (born 1974)

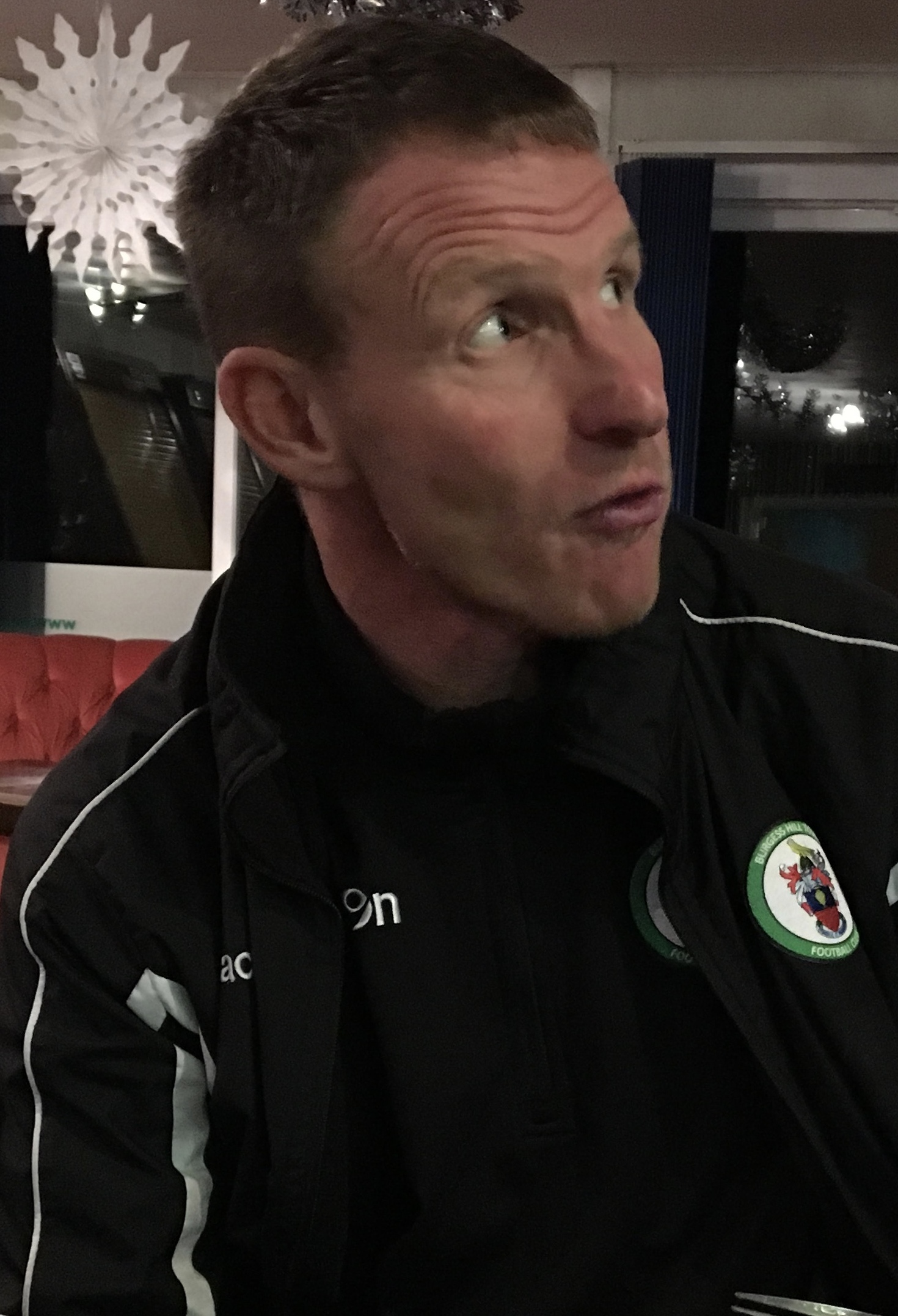
- Tuck at Burgess Hill Town in 2016

Personal information
- Full name: Stuart Gary Tuck
- Date of birth: 1 October 1974 (age 52)
- Place of birth: Brighton, England
- Height: 5 ft 11 in (1.80 m)
- Position: Defender

Youth career
- 1990–1991: Whitehawk
- 1991–1993: Brighton & Hove Albion

Senior career*
Years	Team	Apps	(Gls)
1993–1998	Brighton & Hove Albion	93	(1)
1998–2001	Worthing		
2001–2006	Eastbourne Borough		
2006	Burgess Hill Town		
2006–2007	Bognor Regis Town		
2007–2009	Burgess Hill Town		
2009–2010	Eastbourne Town	13	(0)
2010–2012	Whitehawk		
2012	→ Burgess Hill Town (loan)		
2012–2018	Burgess Hill Town		
2018	Shoreham		

Managerial career
- 2012–2018: Burgess Hill Town (assistant)
- 2020–2022: Whitehawk (assistant)
- * Club domestic league appearances and goals

Stuart Gary Tuck (born 1 October 1974) is an English former professional footballer who was most recently assistant manager at Whitehawk. Tuck played as a left back in the Football League for Brighton & Hove Albion until injury put an end to his professional career. Tuck then played as a centre back for many years in non-league football in Sussex.

After being assistant manager at Burgess Hill Town for five years he resumed his playing career with Shoreham in 2018. Tuck then had a spell as assistant manager at his first club Whitehawk.

== Career ==
While at school Tuck played junior football for Bevendean Barcelona and then for Whitehawk U18, where he appeared in midfield as a 15-year old. He was associated with Brighton & Hove Albion as a schoolboy, and joined the club as a YTS trainee when he left school in 1991. He made his first-team debut on 28 September 1993 in the Football League Trophy, and his Second Division debut four days later at the Goldstone Ground in the starting eleven for a goalless draw with Exeter City.

Tuck went on to make 93 league appearances, scoring once, and captained Albion on several occasions. He appeared at left back in the final game at the Goldstone Ground, against Doncaster Rovers in 1997, and the following week played the full 90 minutes against Hereford United in the game that secured Albion's status as a Football League team. Tuck missed the last couple of months of the 1997–98 season with a groin problem that required surgery. He played the whole of Brighton's first three fixtures of the 1998–99 season, but those were his last at Football League level. He received specialist advice that he should "take things easy" as he recovered from the surgery, and ended up retiring from full-time football.

Tuck signed for Isthmian League Division One club Worthing on a non-contract basis in January 2000, where he began as cover for the injured Mark Knee and finished up winning both the Supporters' and the Players' Player of the Year awards for 2000–01.

In October 2001, feeling he had "gone as far as [he] can with Worthing", Tuck joined Southern League Division One club Eastbourne Borough. He remained for nearly five years, won both Player of the Year awards in the 2003–04 season, and was voted Player of the Round for the 2004–05 FA Cup fourth qualifying round. He captained the team as they reached the 2005 Conference North/South play-off final, and scored a "wonder goal" from 30 yards (27 m) in the semifinal against Thurrock, but Borough lost the final 2–1 to Altrincham. After missing much of pre-season with a calf injury, Tuck started the 2006–07 season out of favour. He spent a brief spell on loan at Isthmian League Burgess Hill Town, He played twice more for Borough, taking his appearance total to 228 in all competitions, and then moved on, to Conference South rivals Bognor Regis Town.

A serious achilles tendon injury in March 2007 put an early end to Tuck's season, but he was still chosen as Bognor's Player of the Year. He was expected to return later in the year once his recovery was complete, but instead rejoined Burgess Hill Town in December. He took on a coaching role as well as playing, until an ankle problem put an early end to his on-field season in January 2009. After manager Jamie Howell was dismissed in March, Tuck was interviewed for the vacancy, but turned it down and left the club. He rejoined Bognor Regis Town ahead of the 2009–10 season, announced his retirement from the game in October, and signed for Eastbourne Town in January 2010.

Tuck joined Whitehawk for the 2010–11 Isthmian League season, and remained as part of the team that won the 2011–12 Isthmian League Division One South title as well as the Sussex Senior Cup final, in which they beat Crawley Down at Brighton's Falmer Stadium. He signed for Burgess Hill Town for a third time, initially on loan, and was then appointed assistant manager in November 2012 after Adam Hinshelwood stepped down.

Tuck was mentioned in connection with the managerial vacancy at Bognor Regis Town in May 2017.

Tuck made a rare start for Burgess Hill Town in the Sussex Senior Cup in January 2018 against Saltdean United, but was sent off early in the second half for a second yellow card. He left the Hillians in September 2018, and subsequently signed as a player for Shoreham where he appeared alongside his son Josh. Tuck re-joined one of his former clubs, Whitehawk, as assistant manager in November 2020, and left in April 2022 when manager Ross Standen was replaced.

== Personal life ==
Tuck was born in Brighton and attended Stanley Deason Secondary School in Whitehawk. He later worked on the PE staff at Varndean School in Brighton.
