= Dan Kirkwood =

Scottish footballer

Personal information
- Full name: Daniel Kirkwood
- Date of birth: 24 December 1900
- Place of birth: Dalserf, Scotland
- Date of death: 20 October 1977 (aged 76)
- Place of death: Stonehouse, Scotland
- Height: 5 ft 11 in (1.80 m)
- Position: Inside right

Senior career*
| Years | Team | Apps | (Gls) |
| – | Ashgill YMCA | | |
| 1923–1924 | Airdrieonians | 4 | (2) |
| 1924–1926 | Rangers | 1 | (0) |
| 1925–1926 | → St Johnstone (loan) | 20 | (5) |
| 1926–1928 | Sheffield Wednesday | 18 | (1) |
| 1928–1933 | Brighton & Hove Albion | 168 | (74) |
| 1933 | Luton Town | 2 | (1) |
| 1933–1934 | Swindon Town | 7 | (0) |
- * Club domestic league appearances and goals

Daniel Kirkwood (24 December 1900 – 20 October 1977) was a Scottish professional footballer who played in the Scottish League for Rangers and scored 76 goals from 205 appearances in the Football League playing for Sheffield Wednesday, Brighton & Hove Albion, Luton Town and Swindon Town. He played as an inside right.

Kirkwood was born in Dalserf, South Lanarkshire. He turned professional with Airdrieonians in 1923, and in August of the following year moved to Rangers. Unable to dislodge Scotland international Andy Cunningham from the starting eleven, Kirkwood spent a season on loan at St Johnstone, and played only once for Rangers in the Scottish League, in a 2–1 defeat of Partick Thistle on 28 August 1926.

In November of that year, he joined Sheffield Wednesday, where he made 18 appearances in as many months before moving on to Brighton & Hove Albion at the end of the 1927–28 season for a £500 fee. Described as slow but constructive, Kirkwood scored 74 goals from 168 League appearances for the club and was their top scorer in the 1928–29 season with 21 goals in all competitions. His career was affected by injury, and he was allowed to leave on a free transfer in October 1933, spending a few weeks with Luton Town before finishing the season and his professional career with Swindon Town. Kirkwood returned to Scotland where he worked as a miner. He died in Stonehouse, South Lanarkshire in 1977 at the age of 76.

His elder brother Andrew Kirkwood was also a footballer who was contracted to Rangers and was loaned to St Johnstone at the same time as Dan where the siblings played together; Andrew also featured for Hamilton Academical.
