= Len Darling (footballer) =

English footballer

Personal information
- Full name: Henry Leonard Darling
- Date of birth: 9 August 1911
- Place of birth: Gillingham, England
- Date of death: 6 February 1958 (aged 46)
- Place of death: Felixstowe, England
- Height: 5 ft 7 in (1.70 m)
- Position: Wing half

Senior career*
Years	Team	Apps	(Gls)
- Colchester Town
- Tufnell Park
- Chatham Town
1932–1933	Gillingham	14	(0)
1933–1948	Brighton & Hove Albion	199	(5)
- * Club domestic league appearances and goals

Henry Leonard Darling (9 August 1911 – 6 February 1958) was an English professional footballer who made 213 Football League appearances playing as a wing half for Gillingham and Brighton & Hove Albion.

== Life and career ==
Darling was born in Gillingham. He played non-league football before joining his hometown club, Gillingham of the Football League Third Division South, in 1933. After one season, during which he made 14 league appearances, he signed for Brighton & Hove Albion, where he established himself as a first-team regular. He made 141 league appearances in the pre-war period, served as an ARP ambulance driver during the conflict (as well as playing for Brighton and as a guest for Bournemouth & Boscombe Athletic in the wartime competitions), and played a further 58 league matches after the resumption. He also coached in schools and acted as trainer to the England youth team. After football, he worked as a schoolteacher. He died in Felixstowe, Suffolk, in 1958 at the age of 47.
