= Joe Wilson (footballer, born 1909) =

English footballer

Personal information
- Full name: Joseph Alexander Wilson
- Date of birth: 28 March 1909 (Note: Carder & Harris, Albion A–Z, gives a date of birth of 28 March 1909, which is also the birthdate that appears on his entry in the register of deaths. Other sources give the date of birth as 23 March 1911 or 29 September 1911.)
- Place of birth: High Spen, England
- Date of death: 3 April 1984 (aged 75)
- Place of death: Brighton, England
- Height: 5 ft 6 in (1.68 m)
- Position: Inside right

Senior career*
Years	Team	Apps	(Gls)
- Spen Black and White
- Winlaton Celtic
1931–1933	Tanfield Lea Institute		
1933–1936	Newcastle United	28	(5)
1936–1947	Brighton & Hove Albion	156	(15)

Managerial career
- 1963: Brighton & Hove Albion (caretaker manager)
- * Club domestic league appearances and goals

Joseph Alexander Wilson (28 March 1909 – 3 April 1984) was an English professional footballer who played as an inside right in the Football League for Newcastle United and Brighton & Hove Albion. He had a brief spell as caretaker manager of the latter club in 1963.

== Life and career ==
Wilson was born in High Spen, County Durham, in 1909. His younger brother, Glen, also became a footballer.

Wilson played football for Spen Black and White, Winlaton Celtic and Tanfield Lea Institute before signing for Newcastle United, initially on amateur forms, in 1933. He impressed for their Central League team, and turned professional in September 1933. He made his senior debut on Christmas Day 1934 and scored in a 6–2 defeat of Hull City in the Second Division, and played regularly through the second half of that season. However, he fell out of favour, playing in only 14 matches in 1935–36, many of which were in positions other than his preferred inside right, and was made available for transfer at a fee of £500. He spoke to two Third Division South clubs, Cardiff City and Brighton & Hove Albion, and chose to sign for the latter; the fee paid was £450.

Wilson impressed with his pace and his ability on the ball, and was a regular in the side, although not always at inside right. In the three seasons running up to the Second World War, as Albion finished third, fifth and third, Wilson missed only nine matches in league and FA Cup. During the war he served as a Physical Training Instructor and when duty permitted, appeared for Albion in the wartime competitions. He resumed his career with appearances in all ten of Albion's 1945–46 FA Cup matches and 39 of their 42 fixtures in the first post-war league season. He then retired as a player and was appointed assistant to trainer Alex Wilson. When Alex Wilson left the club in 1952, Wilson succeeded him as trainer, a post he held for 18 years. In 1963, he had a brief spell as caretaker manager between George Curtis's departure and the arrival of Archie Macaulay. After five years as chief scout, he retired in 1974.

He remained in the Brighton area, where he died in 1984 at the age of 75.

== Career statistics ==
Appearances and goals by club, season and competition
Club	Season	League			FA Cup		Other		Total	
Club	Season	Division	Apps	Goals	Apps	Goals	Apps	Goals	Apps	Goals
Newcastle United	1933–34	Second Division	0	0	0	0	—		0	0
Newcastle United	1934–35	Second Division	14	4	2	0	—		16	4
Newcastle United	1935–36	Second Division	14	1	0	0	—		14	1
Newcastle United	Total		28	5	2	0	—		30	5
Brighton & Hove Albion	1936–37	Third Division South	38	7	1	0	1 (Note: Appearances in Third Division South Cup)	0	40	7
Brighton & Hove Albion	1937–38	Third Division South	42	3	4	2	1	0	47	5
Brighton & Hove Albion	1938–39	Third Division South	37	5	1	0	0	0	38	5
Brighton & Hove Albion	1945–46	—			10	1	—		10	1
Brighton & Hove Albion	1946–47	Third Division South	39	0	1	0	—		40	0
Brighton & Hove Albion	Total		156	15	17	3	2	0	175	18
Career total			184	20	19	3	2	0	205	23
