= Ernie Marriott =

English footballer

Personal information
- Full name: Ernest Marriott
- Date of birth: 25 January 1913
- Place of birth: Sutton-in-Ashfield, England
- Date of death: 6 September 1989 (aged 76)
- Place of death: Hove, England
- Height: 5 ft 9 in (1.75 m)
- Position: Right back

Senior career*
Years	Team	Apps	(Gls)
19??–1934	Sutton Junction		
1934–1949	Brighton & Hove Albion	163	(1)
1949–1951	Tonbridge		
1951–1952	Eastbourne United		
- * Club domestic league appearances and goals

Ernest Marriott (25 January 1913 – 6 September 1989) was an English professional footballer who made 163 Football League appearances playing as a right back for Brighton & Hove Albion.

== Life and career ==
Marriott was born in Sutton-in-Ashfield, Nottinghamshire. He was playing for Sutton Junction when he signed amateur forms with Brighton & Hove Albion of the Football League Third Division South. He remained with Sutton until January 1934, when he turned professional with Albion. He made his debut that same season, but was unable to establish himself in the first team until 1937–38, and helped them finish as runners-up the following season, after which the Football League was suspended for the duration of the Second World War. Marriott served in the Royal Army Service Corps and the Worcestershire Regiment, and played football for Glentoran while stationed in Northern Ireland. He played for Albion for another two seasons after the war before joining Tonbridge of the Southern League. He then took up coaching, first as player-coach of Eastbourne United and then as coach of Brighton's reserves. Marriott remained living in nearby Hangleton until his death in 1989 at the age of 76.
