= Joe McGhie (footballer, born 1884) =

Scottish footballer

Personal information
- Full name: Joseph McGhie
- Date of birth: 22 March 1884
- Place of birth: Kilbirnie, Scotland
- Date of death: 8 September 1976 (aged 92)
- Place of death: Largs, Scotland
- Height: 5 ft 8 in (1.73 m)
- Position: Centre-half

Senior career*
Years	Team	Apps	(Gls)
1905–1906	Vale of Garnock Strollers		
1906–1908	Sunderland	41	(0)
1908–1909	Sheffield United	6	(0)
1909–1913	Brighton & Hove Albion	133	(3)
1913–191?	Stalybridge Celtic		
- * Club domestic league appearances and goals

Joseph McGhie (22 March 1884 – 8 September 1976) was a Scottish professional footballer who played as a centre-half for Football League clubs Sunderland and Sheffield United in the and for Brighton & Hove Albion of the Southern League. He was a member of the Albion team that won the 1910 FA Charity Shield.
