= Arthur Attwood =

English footballer

Personal information
- Full name: Arthur Albert Attwood
- Date of birth: 1 December 1901
- Place of birth: Walsall, England
- Date of death: 6 December 1974 (aged 73)
- Place of death: Hove, England
- Height: 5 ft 9 in (1.75 m)
- Position: Forward

Senior career*
Years	Team	Apps	(Gls)
- Walsall LMS
1928–1929	Walsall	14	(13)
1929–1930	Everton	3	(0)
1930–1931	Bristol Rovers	51	(27)
1931–1935	Brighton & Hove Albion	87	(55)
1935–1937	Northfleet United		
- Hove
Total		155	(95)
- * Club domestic league appearances and goals

Arthur Albert Attwood (1 December 1901 – 6 December 1974) was an English footballer who scored 95 goals from 155 Football League matches playing as a forward for Walsall, Everton, Bristol Rovers and Brighton & Hove Albion.

== Life and career ==
Arthur Albert Attwood was born on 1 December 1901 in Walsall, Staffordshire. The 1921 Census finds him serving as a private in the 2nd Battalion, King's Shropshire Light Infantry, then based at Curragh Camp in Ireland. He went on to spend several years with the British Army of the Rhine, during which he played representative football for Army teams.

Towards the end of his military service he was occasionally able to play football for Walsall LMS, and in September 1928, after he left the Army, he turned professional with Football League Third Division South club Walsall. A switch from outside right to centre forward in late October brought Attwood nine goals in two matches, six against Bilston in the Birmingham League and three against Birmingham in the Staffordshire Senior Cup, and a place in the first team. He made his Football League debut on 3 November 1928 at home to Brentford, scored, and by his 14th league match, on 23 February 1929 against Queens Park Rangers, he had 13 goals.

Straight after that match, Attwood signed for First Division club Everton for a fee widely described as substantial, believed by the Birmingham Gazette's Nimrod to be "in the region of £2,000", and recorded in the buying club's minutes as £1,500. He made a good impression on debut for Everton's reserves a few days later on a hard and snowy pitch, scoring from a move that he himself had started, but his first-team debut was less successful. Brought into the side with Dixie Dean on international duty, "Attwood, the ex-Walsall player, was unlucky in having to make his First Division debut in a match in which none of the home players could find his form", as Everton lost 4–0 at home to West Ham United on 10 April 1929. He played twice more during the 1929–30 First Division season, at the end of which Everton were relegated, and scored 16 goals for the reserves in the Central League.

Attwood returned to Third Division South football with Bristol Rovers in May 1930, valued at £650 in a proposed part-exchange deal whereby Cliff Britton and Ronnie Dix would join Everton; Britton duly did so, but Dix did not, so Rovers eventually paid the outstanding £325 in cash. He finished his first season with Rovers as the club's top scorer and only ever-present. He shared a prolific partnership with Dix, who scored 19 league goals to Attwood's 24. The following season, three goals from the first nine matches were not enough to stop him being dropped in favour of Tommy Cook, newly arrived on a month's trial, nor were four goals in his first game for the reserves enough to restore him to the first team.

In early November 1931, Attwood signed for Third Division South rivals Brighton & Hove Albion. He played 30 matches in what remained of the season, and his 29 goals made him the team's top scorer. The club secretary forgot to apply for exemption from the qualifying rounds of the 1932–33 FA Cup, so Albion began the competition with matches against local amateur sides. Attwood scored 20 goals from his 33 league matches, but 15 FA Cup goals – 11 in the qualifying rounds – made a major contribution to his setting a new club record of 35 goals in a season. After injury and appendicitis disrupted his 1933–34 season, he lost his place to Buster Brown and was unable to regain it.

Attwood moved on to Northfleet United of the Kent League in August 1935, and later played for Hove and for the works team of Brighton Hove and District Omnibus, who employed him as a bus conductor. Attwood served in the RAF during the Second World War, and played wartime football for clubs including Leicester City.

Attwood was married to Winifred Hill; the couple had four children. He died in Hove, Sussex, on 6 December 1974 at the age of 73.
