= The Argus (Brighton) =

Newspaper in Brighton and Hove, England

- Type: Daily newspaper
- Owner: USA Today Co.
- Publisher: Newsquest
- Editor: Arron Hendy
- Founded: 1880
- Language: English
- Circulation: 4,425 (as of 2024)
- Website: theargus.co.uk

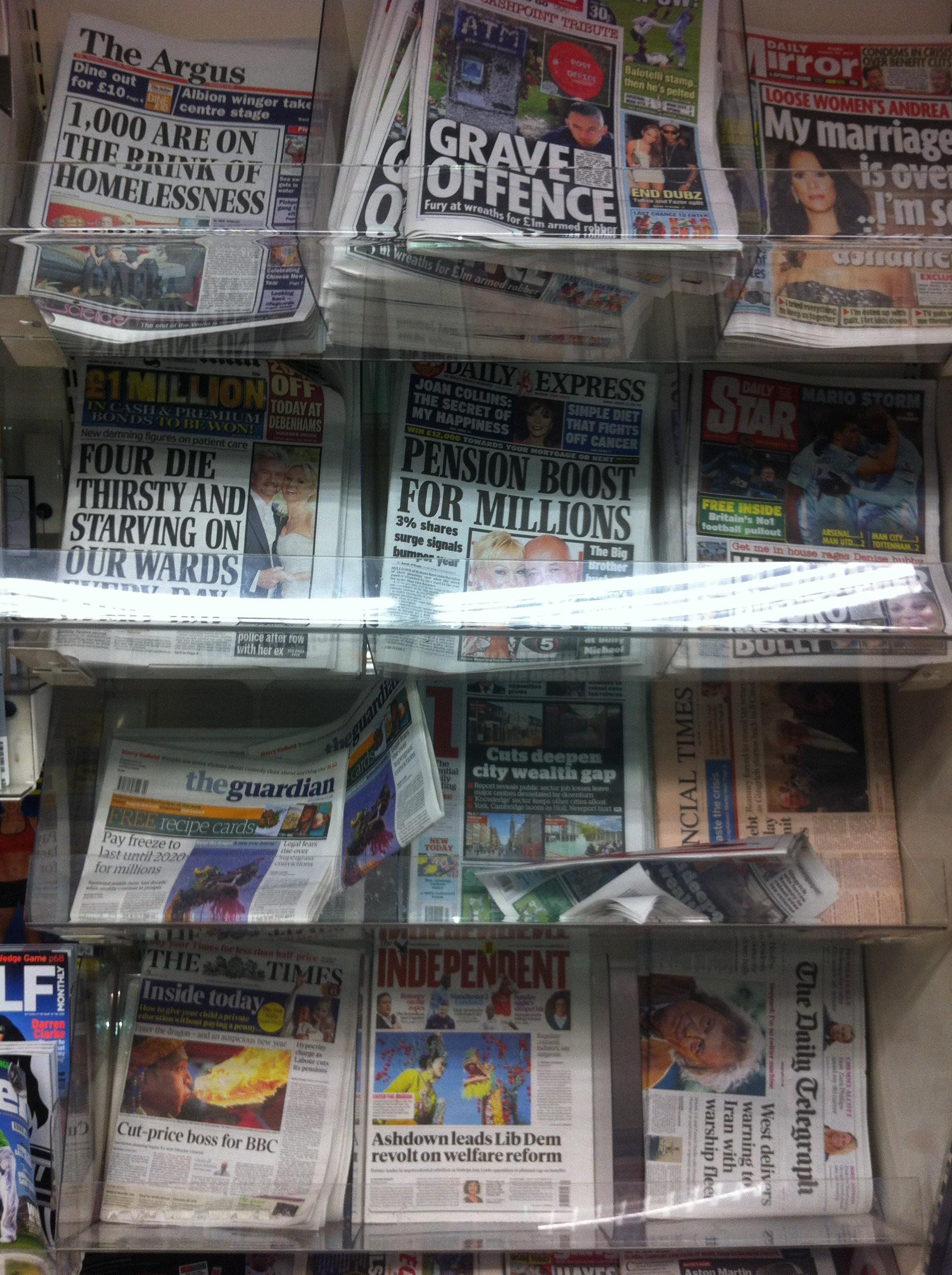
The Argus on first row of a newsstand

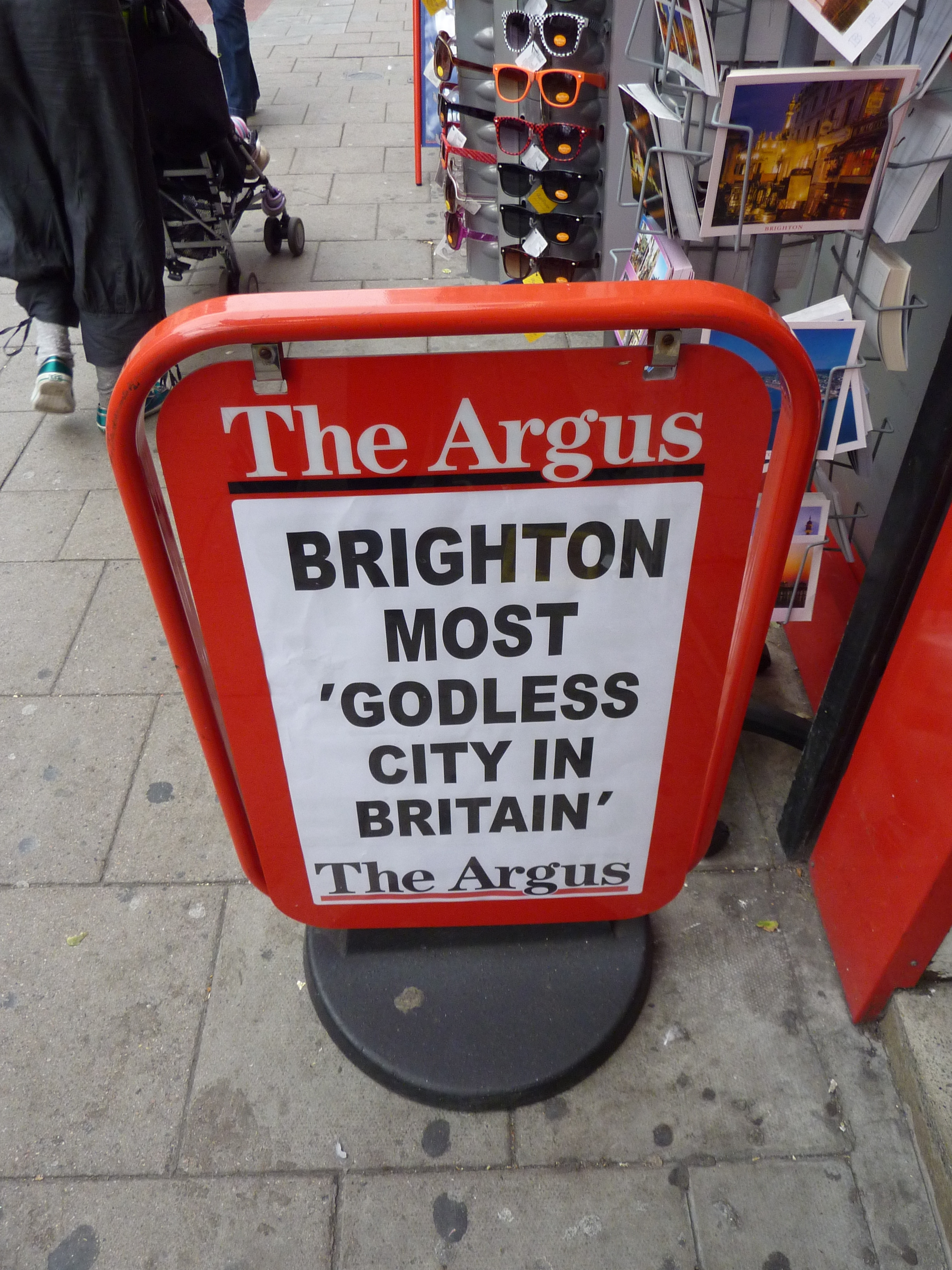

The Argus is a local newspaper based in Brighton and Hove in East Sussex, England, with editions serving the city of Brighton and Hove and the other parts of both East Sussex and West Sussex. The newspaper covers local news, politics and sport, including the city's largest football club, Brighton & Hove Albion FC.

== History ==
Founded in 1880, and for many years known as the Evening Argus, the newspaper is owned by Newsquest (since 1999, part of the US Gannett media group) which in 1996 bought The Argus and its sister Westminster Press titles from the provincial papers group's parent, the Pearson Group. The Argus reached a peak circulation of 100,000 in the early 1980s but, like most of its counterparts in the British regional press, has since experienced a considerable decline in sales. In the period December 2010 to June 2011, the paper had an average daily circulation of 24,949 but by the period January to June 2013, average daily sales had dropped to 16,622. For the period July to December 2017 average daily circulation had fallen to 10,581.

The Argus was forced to postpone celebrations of its 140th anniversary in 2020 due to the COVID-19 pandemic. Reporters from the publication appeared in a Channel 4 News feature broadcast in February 2021, looking at how the pandemic impacted Brighton.

The newspaper was highly commended in 2021 at the Society of Editors' Regional Press Awards in the daily newspaper of the year category.

== Controversies ==
In February 2018 The Argus was found by the Independent Press Standards Organisation (IPSO) to have breached its Editors' Code of Practice with regard to a story which it had published the previous September. IPSO found that the newspaper had behaved in a discriminatory way in its reporting of a court case by describing the plaintiff as an "amputee" in a headline and referring to his disability in the body of the article, in spite of the fact that the crime of which he was accused was "plainly irrelevant to his physical disability". The committee found the reportage to be "a serious and unjustified breach of the Code" and was "extremely concerned" by the "serious failure in relation to both staff training and editorial oversight of material published by the newspaper." Further, IPSO was "deeply concerned about the newspaper's handling of the complaint" and found that "the newspaper's decision to make its offer to remove the material conditional on the complainant agreeing not to pursue his complaint further, was not a suitable or satisfactory response." As remediation, the newspaper was ordered to publish IPSO's findings both on its website and in its print edition.

In October 2018, Newsquest paid "a substantial sum" in compensation and legal costs to a Shoreham businessman whom The Argus had wrongly claimed was connected with the 2017 Manchester Arena bombing and falsely alleged was an "ISIS sympathiser". The complainant's barrister said that he had been caused "very great distress, anxiety and damage to his reputation". Following the High Court verdict, a Newsquest representative admitted the report was "wholly false" and apologised.

In April 2022, editor Arron Hendy defended his decision to publish a picture of Adolf Hitler on the paper's front page following criticism by Jewish community leaders. The picture was used to illustrate a story about a person who had used the name ‘Adolf Hitler’ to sign a petition calling for the return of a cycle lane. The Sussex Jewish Representative Council said the use of the image was “crass and offensive” and had caused offence to holocaust survivors.

== See also ==
- List of newspapers in the United Kingdom
