= 1909–10 Southern Football League =

The 1909–10 season was the 16th in the history of Southern Football League. Brighton & Hove Albion won Division One for the first time, Stoke and Hastings & St Leonards finished top of the Division Two groups, though they were not promoted to Division One. Stoke were the only club to apply for election to the Football League, but were unsuccessful.

== Division One ==
Southern Football League Division One
- Season: 1909–10
- Champions: Brighton & Hove Albion (1st title)
- Promoted: none
- Relegated: Croydon Common; Reading
- Matches: 462
- Goals: 1,362 (2.95 per match)

A total of 22 teams contest the division, including 21 sides from previous season and one new team.

Team promoted from 1908–09 Division Two:

- Croydon Common

Pos	Team	Pld	W	D	L	GF	GA	GR	Pts	Relegation
1	Brighton & Hove Albion	42	23	13	6	69	28	2.464	59	
2	Swindon Town	42	22	10	10	92	46	2.000	54	
3	Queens Park Rangers	42	19	13	10	56	47	1.191	51	
4	Northampton Town	42	22	4	16	90	44	2.045	48	
5	Southampton	42	16	16	10	64	55	1.164	48	
6	Portsmouth	42	20	7	15	70	63	1.111	47	
7	Crystal Palace	42	20	6	16	69	50	1.380	46	
8	Coventry City	42	19	8	15	71	60	1.183	46	
9	West Ham United	42	15	15	12	69	56	1.232	45	
10	Leyton	42	16	11	15	60	46	1.304	43	
11	Plymouth Argyle	42	16	11	15	61	54	1.130	43	
12	New Brompton	42	19	5	18	76	74	1.027	43	
13	Bristol Rovers	42	16	10	16	37	48	0.771	42	
14	Brentford	42	16	9	17	50	58	0.862	41	
15	Luton Town	42	15	11	16	72	92	0.783	41	
16	Millwall	42	15	7	20	45	59	0.763	37	
17	Norwich City	42	13	9	20	59	78	0.756	35	
18	Exeter City	42	14	6	22	60	69	0.870	34	
19	Watford	42	10	13	19	51	76	0.671	33	
20	Southend United	42	12	9	21	51	90	0.567	33	
21	Croydon Common	42	13	5	24	52	96	0.542	31	Relegated to Division Two
22	Reading	42	7	10	25	38	73	0.521	24	Relegated to Division Two

Rules for classification: The system of using goal average to separate two teams tied on points was used until the 1976-77 season. The points system: 2 points for a win, 1 point for a draw and 0 points for losing.

== Division Two A ==
Southern Football League Division Two A
- Season: 1909–10
- Champions: Stoke
- Promoted: none
- Relegated: Burton United (resigned)
- Matches: 30
- Goals: 102 (3.4 per match)

All the clubs in the new Division Two A were new to the Southern League, except Salisbury City who had participated in the league since 1906.

Pos	Team	Pld	W	D	L	GF	GA	GR	Pts	Qualification
1	Stoke	10	10	0	0	48	9	5.333	20	
2	Ton Pentre	10	4	2	4	17	21	0.810	10	
3	Merthyr Town	9	4	1	4	16	21	0.762	9	
4	Salisbury City	8	2	1	5	7	18	0.389	5	
5	Burton United	6	2	0	4	8	21	0.381	4	Left league at end of season
6	Aberdare	7	1	0	6	6	11	0.545	2	

Rules for classification: The system of using goal average to separate two teams tied on points was used until the 1976-77 season. The points system: 2 points for a win, 1 point for a draw and 0 points for losing.
Note: Number of goals for and/or against is inaccurate.

== Division Two B ==
Southern Football League Division Two B
- Season: 1909–10
- Champions: Hastings & St Leonards
- Promoted: none
- Relegated: Hastings & St Leonards (resigned); Peterborough City (resigned); South Farnborough Athletic (resigned); Romford (resigned)
- Matches: 30
- Goals: 133 (4.43 per match)

A total of six teams contest the division, including 3 sides from previous season Division Two and three new teams, all of them are newly elected teams.

Newly elected teams:

- Kettering
- Peterborough City
- Romford

Pos	Team	Pld	W	D	L	GF	GA	GR	Pts	Qualification
1	Hastings & St Leonards	9	6	3	0	26	11	2.364	15	Left league at end of season
2	Kettering	10	6	0	4	34	19	1.789	12	
3	Chesham Town	10	5	2	3	25	25	1.000	12	
4	Peterborough City	10	4	2	4	16	23	0.696	10	Left league at end of season
5	South Farnborough Athletic	10	4	1	5	23	19	1.211	9	Left league at end of season
6	Romford	9	0	0	9	7	33	0.212	0	Left league at end of season

Rules for classification: The system of using goal average to separate two teams tied on points was used until the 1976-77 season. The points system: 2 points for a win, 1 point for a draw and 0 points for losing.
Note: Number of goals for and/or against is inaccurate.

== Football League elections ==
Stoke were the only Southern League club to apply for election to the Football League, but received only three votes.

Club	League	Votes
Birmingham	Football League	30
Huddersfield Town	Midland League	26
Grimsby Town	Football League	12
Chesterfield Town	Midland League	6
Stoke	Southern League	3
Hartlepools United	North Eastern League	2
