= Asensio =

Asensio is a Spanish given name and surname.

Notable people with the given name include:

- Asensio Julià i Alvarracín (1760–1832), Spanish painter and engraver
- Asensio Nebot "The Friar" (1779 – after 1831), Spanish monk and rebel

Notable people with the surname include:

- Ana Asensio (born 1978), Spanish actress and filmmaker
- Antonio Asensio (1947–2001), Spanish mass media entrepreneur
- Belén Asensio (born 1976), Spanish female taekwondo practitioner
- Caridad Asensio (1931–2011), Cuban-American migrant worker advocate
- Carlos Asensio Cabanillas (1896–1969), Spanish soldier and statesman
- Charlie Asensio (born 2000), American soccer player/footballer
- Eloy Guerrero Asensio (born 1962), track and field athlete from Spain
- Enrique García Asensio (born 1937), Spanish conductor
- Eugeni Asensio (born 1937), Spanish water polo sports official
- Florentino Asensio Barroso (1877–1936), Spanish Catholic bishop and martyr
- Jaime Asensio de la Fuente, commonly known as Asen (born 1978), a Spanish footballer
- José Asensio Torrado (1892–1961), Spanish general
- José María Asensio (1829–1905), Spanish historian, journalist, biographer and writer
- Manola Asensio (born 1943), Swiss ballet dancer
- Manuel P. Asensio (born 1954), American money manager
- Marco Asensio (born 1996), Spanish footballer
- Maria Asensio (born 1955), Spanish-Argentinian physical chemist, academic, researcher, and author
- Melanio Asensio (1936–2021), Spanish athlete
- Nicole Laurel Asensio (born 1986), Filipino singer-songwriter
- Pablo Asensio (born 1973), Argentine footballer
- Pedro Calvo Asensio (1821–1863), Spanish playwright, journalist and politician

== See also ==
- Asensi
- Asencio (surname)
- San Asensio, municipality and town in the La Rioja autonomous community, northern Spain
