= Asensi =

Asensi is a Spanish surname. Notable people with the surname include:

- Alex Asensi (born 1984), Spanish photographer and Pingpongo player
- François Asensi (born 1945), Member of the National Assembly of France
- Juan Manuel Asensi (born 1949), Spanish footballer
- Julia de Asensi (1859–1921), Spanish journalist, translator and writer
- Matilde Asensi (born 1962), Spanish journalist and writer
- Neus Asensi (born 1965), Spanish actress
- Vicente Asensi (1919–2000), Spanish footballer

== See also ==
- Asensio
