= Asencio (surname) =

Asencio is a Spanish surname. Notable people with this name include:

- Asencio, or Henry Asencio (born 1972), American painter
- Diego C. Asencio (1931–2020), American diplomat
- Fabrice Asencio (1966–2016), French footballer
- Franco Ascencio (born 1981), Argentine footballer
- Jairo Asencio (born 1983), Dominican baseball pitcher
- Laura Asencio (born 1998), French racing cyclist
- Miguel Asencio (born 1980), Dominican former baseball pitcher
- Nicolás Asencio (born 1975), Ecuadorian footballer
- Robert Asencio (born 1963), American politician
- Raúl Asencio (footballer, born 1998), Spanish footballer
- Raúl Asencio (footballer, born 2003), Spanish footballer
- Vicente Asencio (1908–1979), Spanish composer
- Yeison Asencio (born 1989), Dominican baseball player

== See also ==
- Asencio River, a river in Chile
- Asencio Formation, a geological formation in Uruguay
- Asensio
