= Whitehawk =

Suburb of Brighton, England

Coordinates: 50.824°N 0.105°W

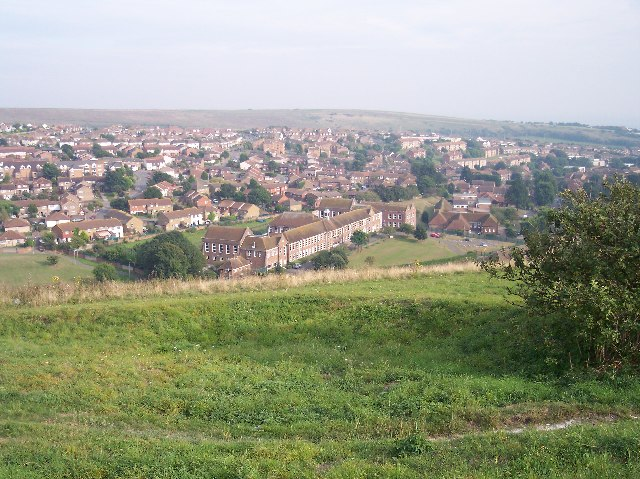
- Whitehawk, viewed from the Neolithic causewayed camp above the estate, 2005

- Location within East Sussex
- Unitary authority: Brighton and Hove
- Ceremonial county: East Sussex
- Region: South East
- Country: England
- Sovereign state: United Kingdom
- Post town: BRIGHTON
- Postcode district: BN2
- Dialling code: 01273
- Police: Sussex
- Fire: East Sussex
- Ambulance: South East Coast
- UK Parliament: Brighton, Kemptown

Whitehawk is a suburb in the east of Brighton, England, south of Bevendean and north of Brighton Marina. The area is a large, modern housing estate built in a downland dry valley historically known as Whitehawk Bottom. The estate was originally developed by the local council between 1933 and 1937 and included nearly 1,200 residences. Subsequently, the Swanborough flats were built in 1967, and in the 1970s and 1980s much of the estate was rebuilt by altering the road layouts and increasing the number of houses. Whitehawk is part of the East Brighton ward of Brighton and Hove City Council.

== History ==
=== Pre-development ===
Before being developed, Whitehawk was chalk downland. At the top of Whitehawk Hill, Whitehawk Camp was a Neolithic causewayed camp of the Windmill Hill culture inhabited around 5500 years ago. It is now a scheduled ancient monument and is one of three causewayed camps known to have existed in the South Downs. The name Whitehawk is believed to be a corruption of "Vied Ac", the Saxon for "holy oak", named after a wooden pole which stood on the hill.

Horse racing started on Whitehawk Down in the late 18th century next to the causewayed camp and connected to the White Hawk Fair. Brighton Race Course is still on the site, which became known as Race Hill. By 1870, the neighbouring Sheepcote Valley was being used as a rifle range to train volunteer soldiers. By 1916 it had begun to be used as a refuse tip. A site at Sheepcote close to the edge of the Whitehawk housing is still used as a Council waste centre for domestic users.

Whitehawk Road, as it then was, came to demarcate the eastern parish boundary of Brighton. In 1818 gas works were built at Black Rock, between Whitehawk and the sea. By virtue of being built there, the works avoided paying taxes in Brighton.

=== 1920 to World War II ===
By the beginning of the 1920s, the Whitehawk area consisted mainly of pig farms, smallholdings and allotments. This would all change over the next decade, when Brighton Corporation, in common with local government authorities all over the country, began a program of slum clearances. Alongside Manor Farm, Whitehawk was one of the areas used for new homes to house the residents. The homes were designed to have "all modern conveniences" including electricity, gas and running water. They also had gardens. This was a huge contrast to the small, back to back terraces in the town centre, which they replaced. Some people found it very difficult to adjust. This was partly because many of those moved earned their living as rag and bone men, conducting their business by horse and cart. This was hard to do from so far out of town.

Between 1933 and 1937 the council estate was built. By 1937 there were nearly 1,200 houses in Whitehawk, all with gardens.

East Brighton Park, at the Eastern extremity of Whitehawk, was home to the first Municipal Camping Ground, opened by the mayor of Brighton, Herbert Hone, in May 1938. It utilised buildings already at the site, formerly belonging to the Newhouse Farm. These buildings are thought to date from the late 18th century.

The first Whitehawk Library opened in 1934 in front of the Primary School. In 1935 a lido was built on the seafront at Black Rock, a short distance from Whitehawk (via the eastern extremities of Brighton's Kemp Town seafront development).

=== 1950s and 1960s ===
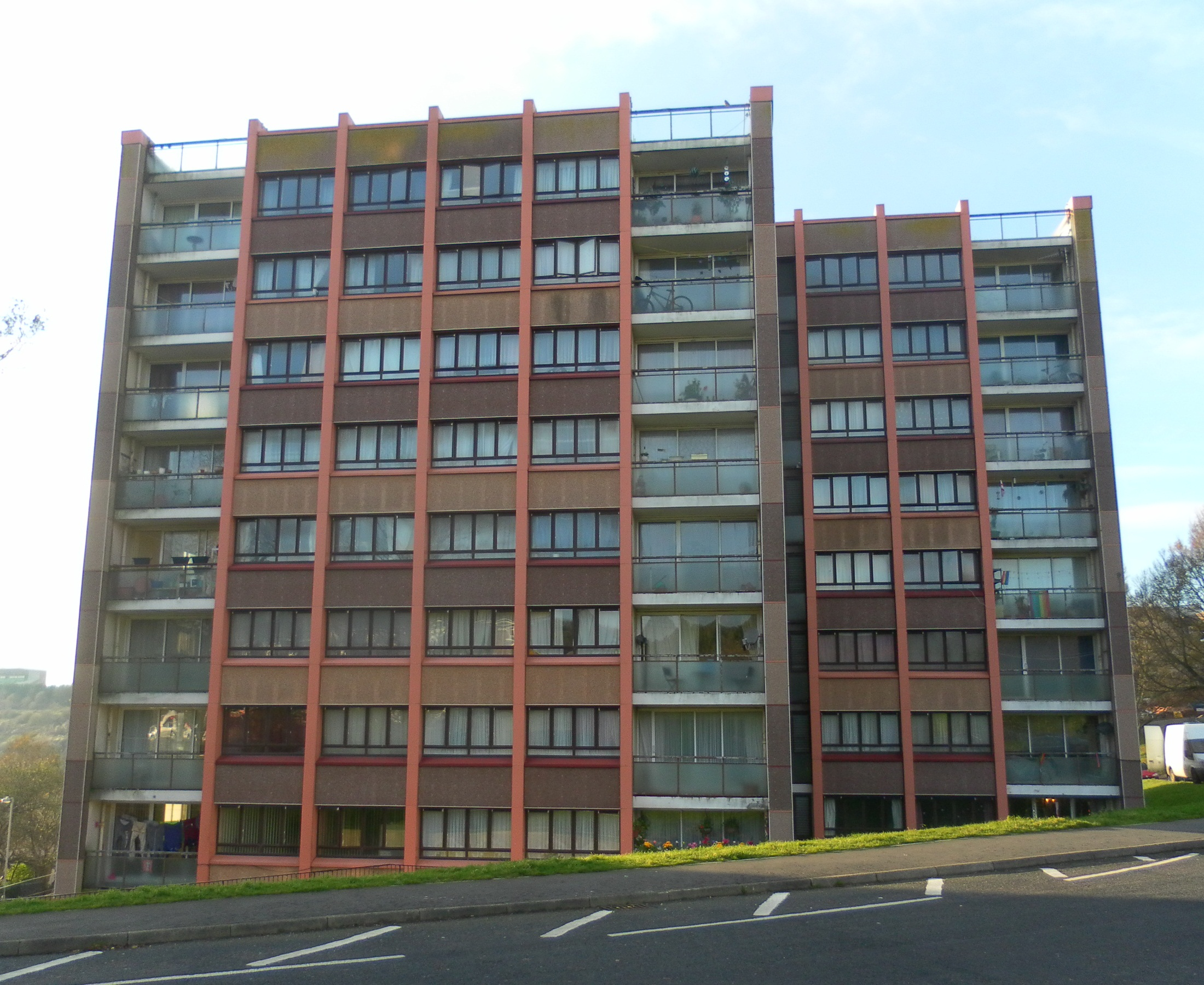
The Swanborough Flats

Post-war Brighton suffered a housing shortage and so further building work was carried out in the Whitehawk area. New low- and high-rise flats were built to the west of Whitehawk (known as the Bristol Estate) and private housing was also started, most notably a large self-build scheme in Wilson Avenue at the far east of the estate. The high rise Swanborough Flats were built by Brighton Corporation at the northern tip of Whitehawk in 1967. By 1969 the library site was needed by the school for classrooms and so a temporary library was opened in Rugby House, Rugby Place.

=== 1970s to 2000s ===
The Community Centre, along with a new library, including a toy library for children was opened by Princess Alexandra in November 1973 in Whitehawk Road. At the time it was the largest in Brighton.

From 1975, the Council started a remodelling exercise in Whitehawk. Initially, houses were left empty as they became vacant, and were boarded up. Many of the long roads in Whitehawk were removed and replaced with smaller cul-de-sacs. This allowed larger numbers of houses to fit into the same space and by the end of the scheme the number of houses in Whitehawk had increased to over 1,400. The last part of the scheme, Lintott Avenue (South) was completed in 1988.

In 1979, the Black Rock lido was demolished in conjunction with the development of Brighton Marina. Construction of the marina had already started in 1971.

The population of Whitehawk (and Manor Farm) was nearly 8,000 in 1981.

In April 2000, The East Brighton New Deal for Communities (EBNDC) Partnership was awarded £47.2m from the government's pilot NDC programme aimed at social regeneration of the area covering Bate's Estate, Higher Bevendean, Manor Farm, Moulsecoomb, Saunders Park and Whitehawk. Money was spent in Whitehawk on various community projects, the most notable being the Crew Club youth centre and The Whitehawk Inn Community Hub. 41 pedestrian alleys were remodelled because they were seen as "havens for anti-social behaviour".

The White Hawk, a chalk carving, was carved in 2001 by local artists with support from the Friends of Sheepcote Valley (FSV) and Whitehawk residents. It was restored mutltiples times, most recently 2013

== 2010s ==
Whitehawk was noted in 2010 to be in the 5% of most deprived areas in Great Britain. Funding of £7.4m was provided by the state and the local council to create a 'community hub'.

After a consultation by two groups not based in Whitehawk, Racehill Community Orchard was built at the top of Whitehawk in 2012. Over 60 fruit trees and 1000 native hedgerow plants were installed. In 2018, the orchard won a Britain in Bloom award.

Over 100 people attended a protest on Whitehawk Hill in 2018, to beat the bounds of the common land. They were angered by plans to build 217 homes on the conservation area. Local environmentalist Dave Bangs said "Whitehawk Hill is more precious than the Brighton Pavilion because of its public value, its ancient history." The plans were definitively discarded by the Council in January 2019.

Following local elections in May 2019, Whitehawk is part of the East Brighton ward represented at Brighton and Hove City Council by Nancy Platts (Labour), Nichole Brennan (Labour) and Gill Williams (Labour).

== Places of worship ==
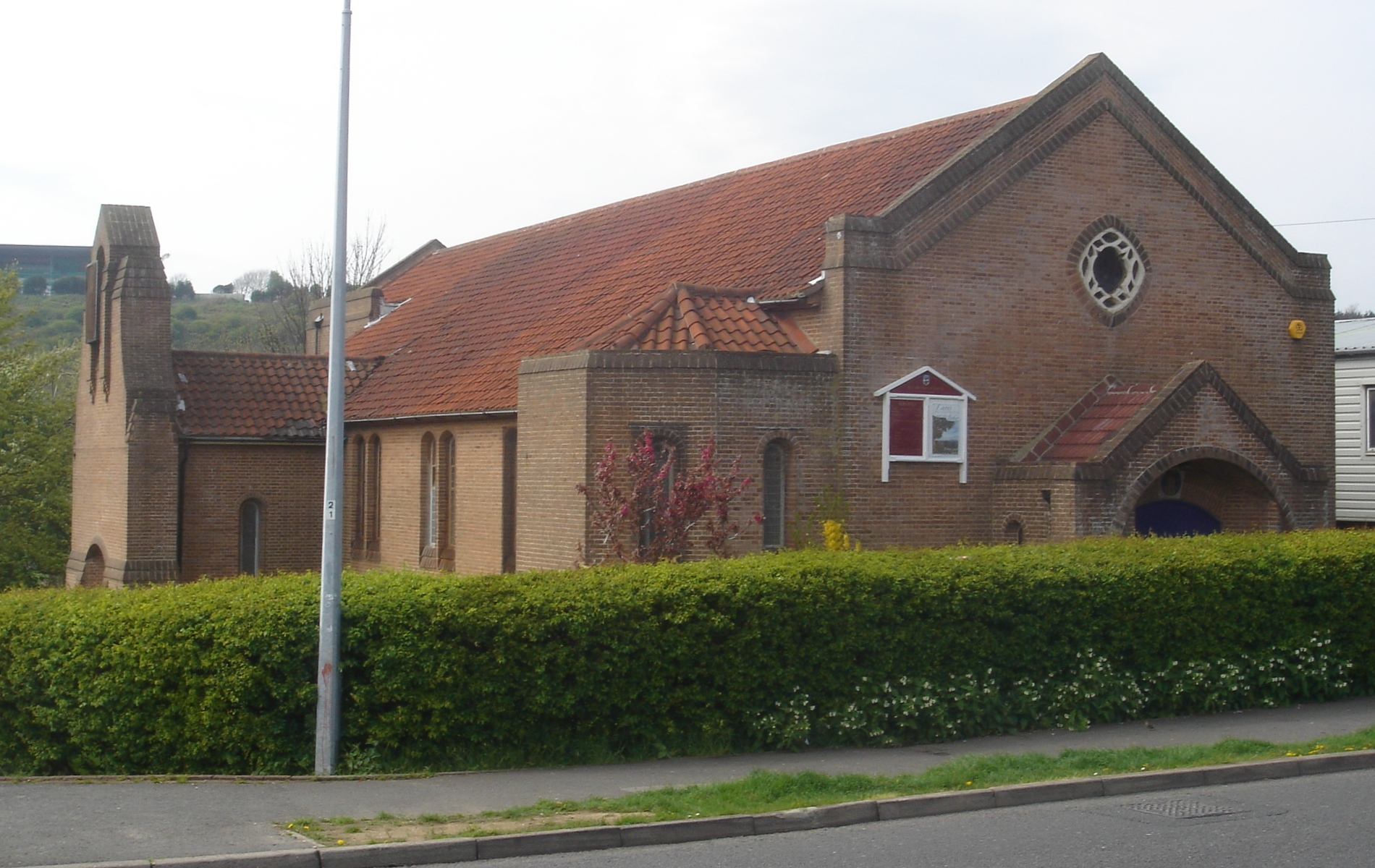
St Cuthman's Church

St Cuthman's (Church of England) Church was built in the 1930s and completely destroyed by bombing in World War II. It was rebuilt after the war, being completed in 1952 to the design of local architect John Leopold Denman. It is sometimes called "the Children's Church" because local children famously saved their pennies to help fund the rebuilding. The church hall was sold to the local Community Association in 1982. St Cuthman's is situated on Whitehawk Way next door to the Valley Social Centre. The church also runs a drop-in centre.

The Valley Social Centre, previously known as St David's Mission Hall (also Church of England) is now used as a community centre, and also runs a drop-in centre.

The Roman Catholic Church of St Louis, King of France opened in 1964 and was demolished in 1982 after being declared unsafe. A block of flats now stands on the site.

== Education ==
=== Primary ===
Whitehawk Primary School caters for children aged between 3 and 11 years old. It was formed by the amalgamation of the old separate Infant and Junior Schools. In May 2006, the 3- and 4-year-olds separated from the primary school and became part of Roundabout Children's Centre for 0- to 5-year-olds which was visited by the Queen in March 2007.

St John the Baptist Catholic School caters for children aged between 4 and 11 years old.

St Mark's Primary School is situated on Manor Road and serves the Whitehawk, Manor and Bristol estates, originally situated by the gasworks, it was moved to its present location in the 1970s. It is a one form of entry school and well known for its nurturing approach and partnership working with families

=== Secondary ===
Stanley Deason Secondary School was opened in 1976. The name was changed to Marina High in September 1997 and East Brighton College of Media Arts (often abbreviated to COMART) in September 1999. It closed in August 2005. It catered for children aged between 11 and 16 years old. When the school closed the pupils were enrolled in the various other schools in Brighton and Hove.

=== Post 16 and adult ===
Whitehawk Inn is a community learning centre in South Whitehawk, occupying a former pub. It was founded in 2001. It provides various long and short term, full- and part-time courses in a wide range of subjects as well as providing advice on gaining employment.

The buildings of the former secondary school are leased to Greater Brighton Metropolitan College, which runs courses in construction skills and in media studies in them.

=== Class Divide (Campaign Group) ===
Class Divide is a grassroots campaign group based in Brighton and Hove, England, focused on addressing educational inequalities in the city, particularly in the East Brighton communities of Whitehawk, Manor Farm, and Bristol Estate. Initially started as an offshoot of The Crew Club, a youth and community centre, Class Divide aims to create a more socially inclusive education system by challenging stereotypes, building a movement for change, and advocating for policy reforms.

== Transport ==
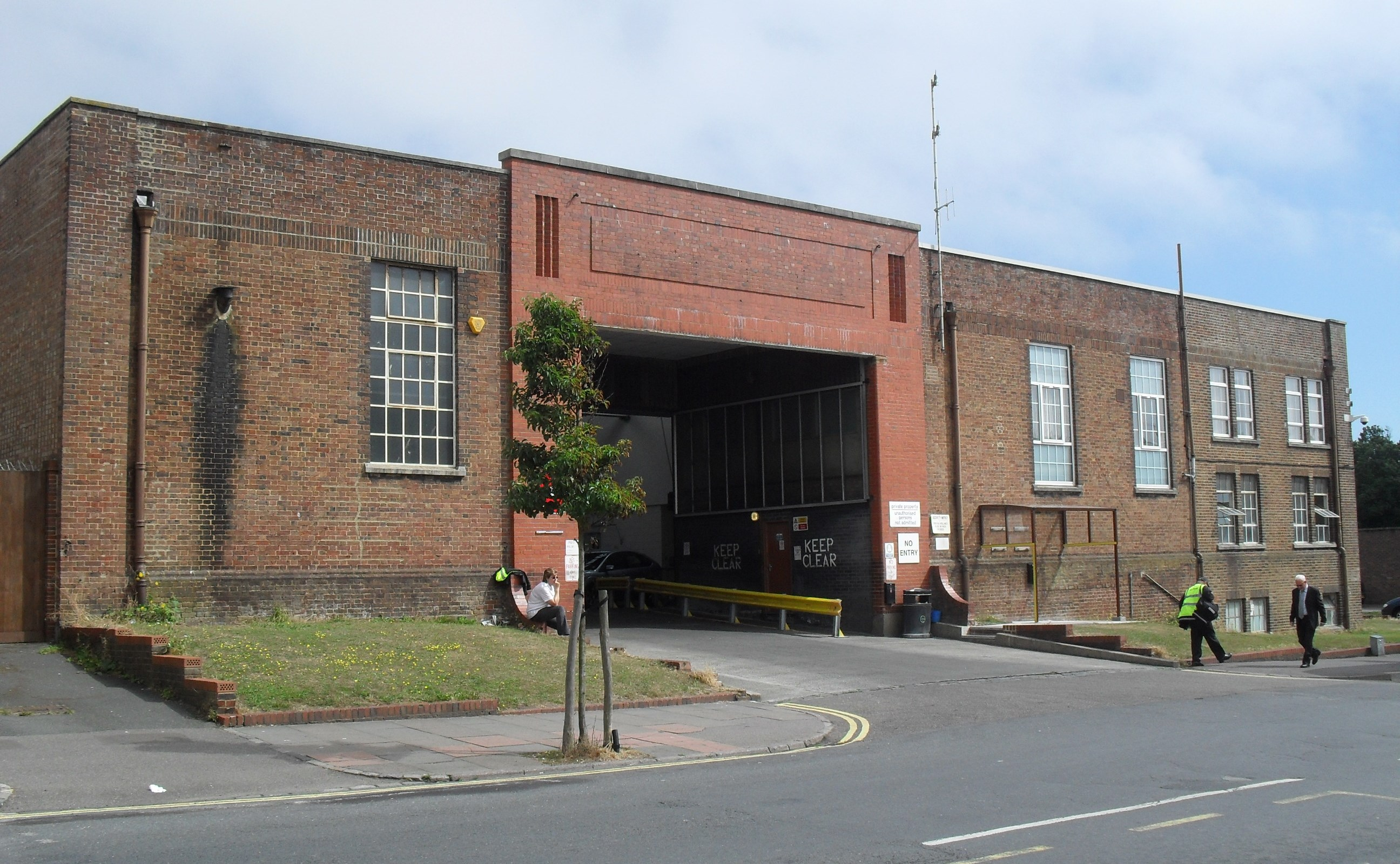
Whitehawk bus depot

The Brighton & Hove Bus and Coach Company maintains a depot at the south end of Whitehawk. As of 2019, Whitehawk was served by buses 1, 1A, 21, 21A, 21E and night bus N21, as well as School buses 71,72, 72A and 73.

== Sport ==
Whitehawk F.C. is a semi-professional football club playing in the Isthmian League Premier Division, the seventh tier of English football. Founded in 1945, The Hawks reached National League South having won promotion three times in the space of four years between 2009 and 2013 as well as the second round of the FA Cup in 2015. Whitehawk play their games at The Enclosed Ground, a stadium in East Brighton Park.

== Gallery ==
Views of Whitehawk
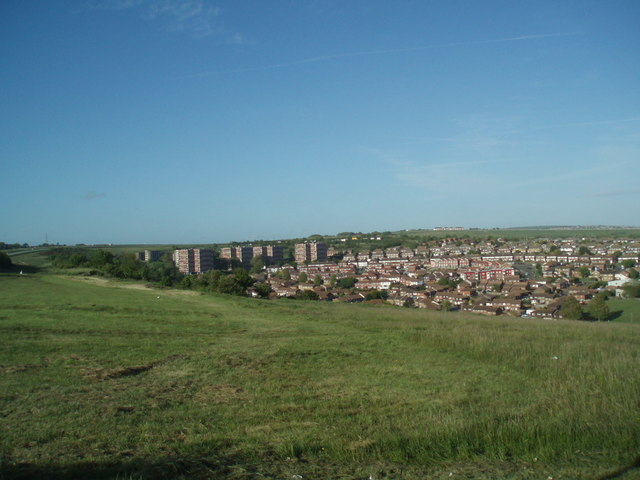
View from Whitehawk Hill to the north of the housing estate

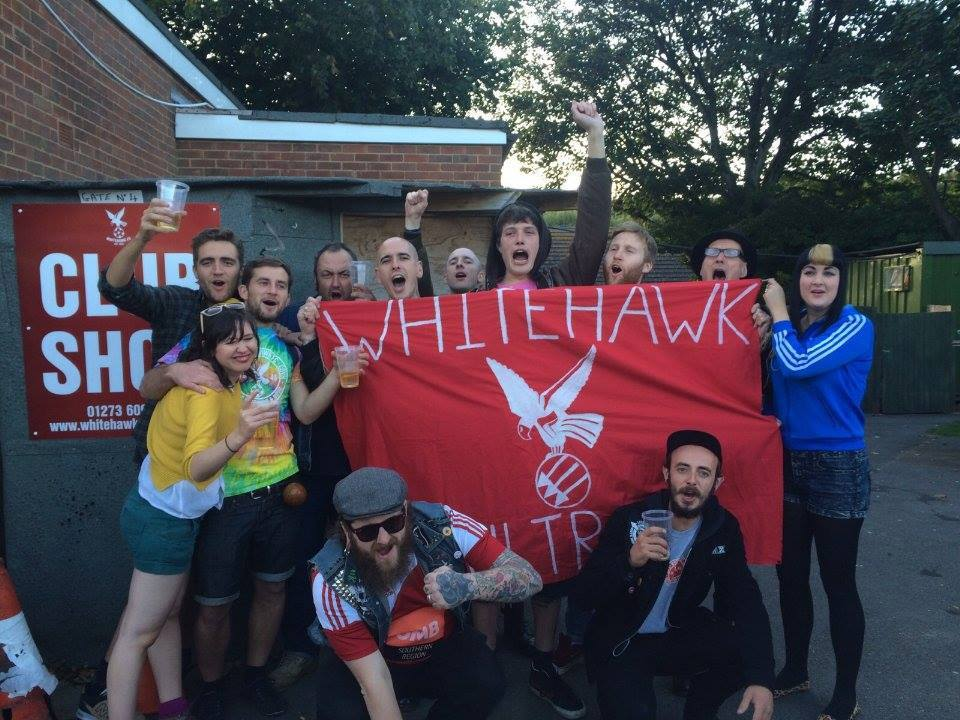
Whitehawk F.C. supporters

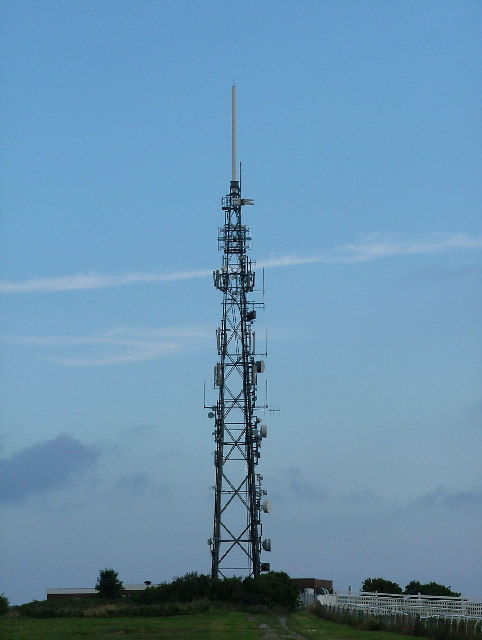
Whitehawk Hill transmitting station

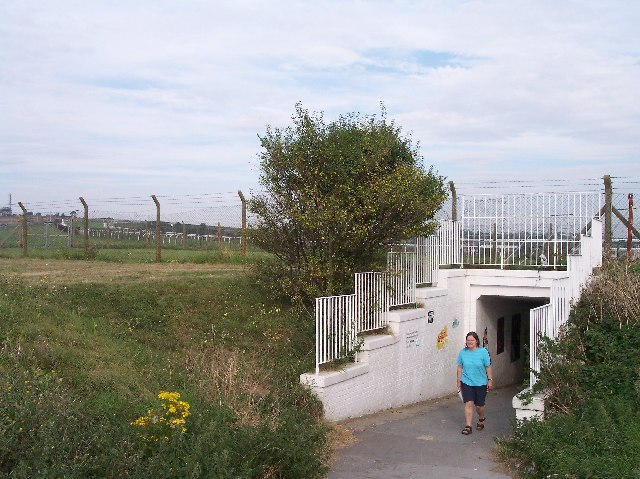
Pedestrian tunnel beneath Brighton Racecourse

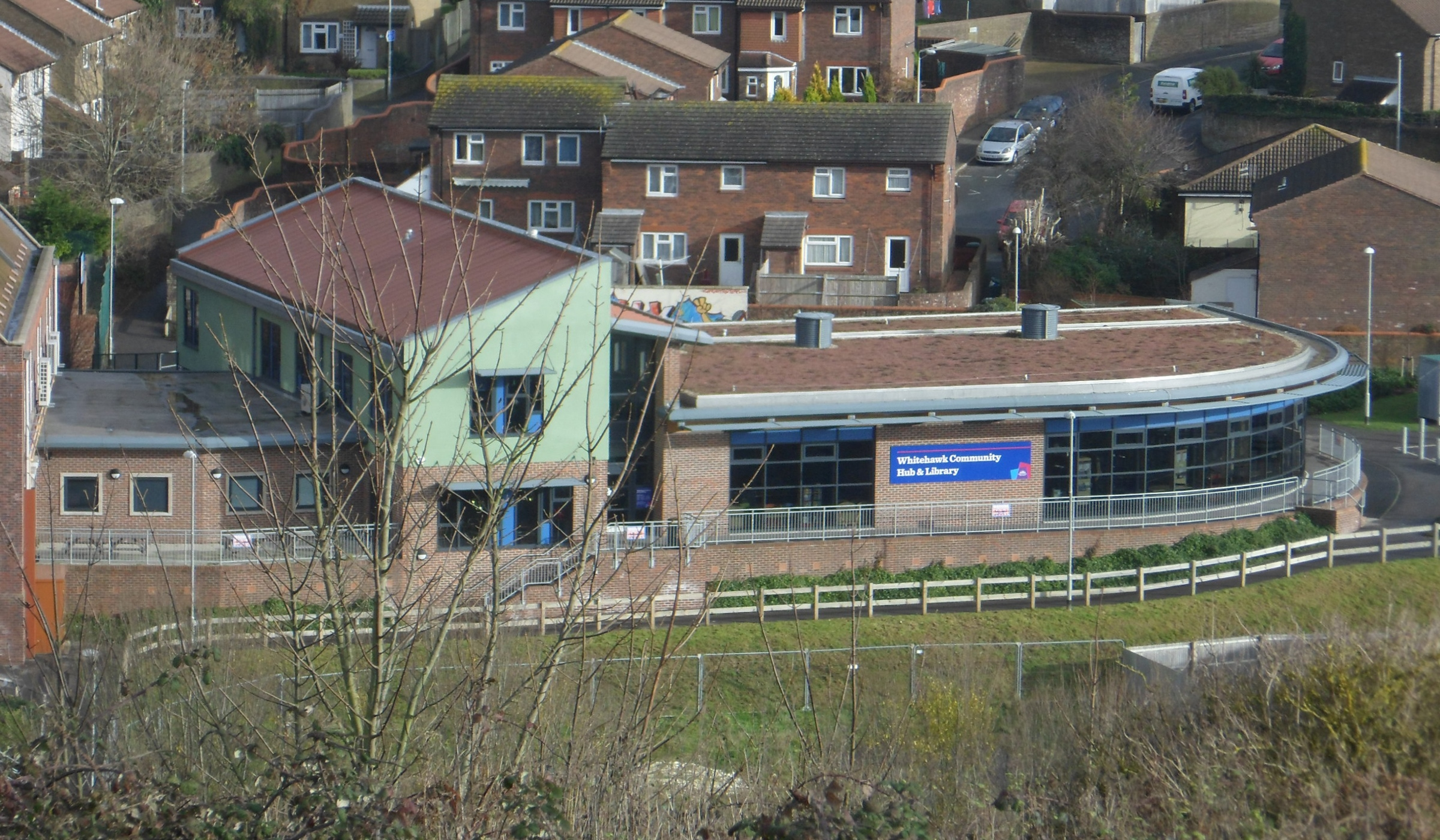
Whitehawk library and community hub

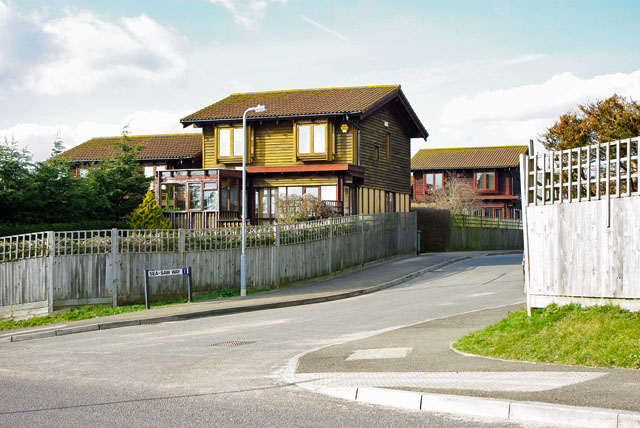
Seesaw Way

== Cultural references ==
- Scenes for the film version of Oh! What a Lovely War were shot in 1968 in Sheepcote Valley.
- Whitehawk is referenced in the chapter "The Birdman of Whitehawk" of the fantasy novel The Brightonomicon by Robert Rankin.
