= Whitehawk F.C. =

Association football club in England

Coordinates: 50°49′17″N 0°05′46″W

Whitehawk
- Full name: Whitehawk Football Club
- Nickname: The Hawks
- Founded: 1945; 81 years ago
- Stadium: The Enclosed Ground
- Capacity: 3,126
- Chairman: Ned McDonnell & John Summers
- Manager: Rob Kember
- League: Isthmian League Premier Division
- 2025–26: Isthmian League Premier Division, 14th of 22
- Website: whitehawkfc.com
Home colours	Away colours

Whitehawk F.C. is a semi-professional football club based in Whitehawk, a suburb of Brighton and Hove, England. They have played in the Isthmian League Premier Division since 2023, when the club won the Isthmian League South East Division playoffs. Whitehawk's home is the 3,126-capacity McLaren Enclosed Ground within East Brighton Park. Nicknamed The Hawks, the club's traditional playing colours are red and white. Before 2010, the club had never played above County League level, but after three promotions in four seasons, they reached the Conference South in 2013. The club reached the second round of the 2016 FA Cup.

== History ==
=== Brighton, Hove and District League ===
The club was founded as the Second World War ended in 1945 as Whitehawk & Manor Farm Old Boys. The original name relates to the Brighton Boys' club, from Whitehawk and the adjoining Manor Farm estate, that wished to continue to play football but were too old to play in the youth league. One of the club's founders, Ron Powell, entered the new team in the Brighton Junior Cup (League) for their first season. The club's first match was a 5–3 away win on 13 October 1945 against Hove County Old Boys at Hove Recreation Ground. Home games were played on the council pitches in East Brighton Park. In their first season, Whitehawk & MFOB did the league and cup double. The team won 14 out of 16 league games, scoring 82 goals and secured the Hove & Worthing Cup with a 5–3 victory against Allen West B. Goalscorers were Chas Eason 2, Jimmy Ward, Gerry Chandler and Holmes.

Whitehawk & MFOB then joined the Brighton, Hove & District Football League, initially in Division 2 before being reassigned to Division 4 when the league expanded for the 1947–48 season. The Hawks once more won a league and cup double, securing the Sussex Junior Cup with victory over West Hove at the Goldstone Ground.

The Hawks were promoted again the following season, 1948–49, after finishing in second place in Division 3 and retained the Sussex Junior Cup, beating Sussex Brick Works 6–1 in the final. In their first season at Intermediate level, 1949–50, The Hawks again completed a league and cup double, winning Brighton League Division 2 and securing the Sussex Intermediate Cup with a 5–1 win against Portfield at Littlehampton. Jimmy Sallis scored a hat-trick with Bill 'Cocker' Blunt netting the other two.

In their debut season at senior level in 1950–51, The Hawks won the Division 1 title, going the whole season unbeaten and winning all but two of their 26 league games. The club also won their first major senior cup trophy, the Sussex Senior Cup by beating Eastbourne Town 1–0 at Woodside Road, Worthing, with Kenny Hayward scoring the only goal after 10 minutes. The Hawks beat Littlehampton Town, Lancing, Crawley Town and Bognor Regis Town on the way to becoming the only Brighton League team ever to win the Sussex Senior Cup. This win also completed an unprecedented series of non-league football cup wins at junior, intermediate and senior levels in successive seasons.

Whitehawk & MFOB applied to join the Sussex League for the following season but their application was not successful. The Hawks retained the Division 1 title in 1952.

=== Sussex County League ===
The club was admitted to the Sussex County League Division 1 in 1952–53 and finished third in their first season. The Hawks' first county league game was a 4–1 win at Crawley Town on 31 August 1952. The club were runners-up for three successive seasons from 1954 to 1955 onwards, and were Sussex Senior Cup finalists in 1954, losing 1–0 to Horsham at the Goldstone Ground in front of a crowd of 5626. The Hawks won the Sussex RUR Cup for the first time in 1955, beating Eastbourne United 1–0 after extra time at the Goldstone. Len Holter scored the only goal in the 103rd minute. The Hawks were never out of the top five in the County League Division 1 for the rest of the decade.

The club's name was changed to Whitehawk FC for the start of the 1958–59 season.

In 1961–62 under manager Billy Thew, Whitehawk won the first of four Division One titles, as well as the Sussex Senior Cup, beating Eastbourne United 4–0 at the Goldstone Ground in front of a 4000 crowd. Hawks scorers were Maurice Barker, Eddie Richardson and Billy Ford 2. Billy Ford scored 16 goals in Sussex Senior Cup football out of a total for the season of 93. The Hawks also beat Worthing 3–1 to win the Brighton Charity Cup. Hawks scorers were Les Adams, Eddie Richardson and Billy Ford.

The following season the competition was abandoned due to bad weather, depriving local rivals Lewes of a likely title, but in 1963–64 the Hawks retained the championship, under Ken Carter, finishing three points clear of second-placed Lewes by winning their last six matches of the season. The crucial victory was a 2–1 home win over Lewes on 25 April 1964. Winger and future FIFA referee Allan Gunn scored twice in the second half as the Hawks came back from 1–0 down at the interval.

In the close season Ken Carter was appointed manager at Lewes and a number of key players joined him at the Dripping Pan. Former Brighton & Hove Albion player Glen Wilson was appointed coach for the 1964–65 season but the club struggled and under manager Ron Pavey found itself relegated for the first time ever in 1967, only to make an immediate return as Division Two champions in 1968.

The next nine years saw Whitehawk continue to compete in the top division, during which time they lost 1–2 to Horsham in the Sussex Senior Cup final in 1972. The Hawks were relegated for a second time in 1977. This time they were to spend four seasons in Division Two, having to apply for re-election in 1979 after finishing second from bottom, their lowest ever senior league placing.

Under new manager Sammy Donnelly, The Hawks won promotion as champions in 1980–81. They entered the FA Cup for the first time in the 1982–83 season but lost 5–2 to Dartford in their first match. In 1983–84 Whitehawk won Division One for the third time as well as enjoying a good run in the FA Vase before losing 1–0 at Corinthian-Casuals in the fourth round.

1986–87 saw the Hawks finish as runners-up to Arundel. In 1988–89, again under manager Sammy Donnelly, Whitehawk had what was at the time their best run in the FA Cup, going out 2–0 in a fourth qualifying round replay to Bognor Regis Town, having previously drawn 2–2 at Nyewood Lane. Former Brighton & Hove Albion striker Gerry Fell scored the second equaliser in the away game with virtually the last kick of the match after coming off the bench. The home attendance record of 2,100 for the replay stood for 27 years and was only bettered in 2015 for the FA Cup replay with Dagenham and Redbridge.

The Hawks won the Sussex RUR Cup for the third time in 1990–91, beating Peacehaven & Telscombe in the final 2–1, with youth player and future manager Darren Freeman heading the winner. 1993–94 was another good season for the club, finishing once again as runners-up this time to Wick, as well as having their best ever run in the FA Vase, reaching the fifth round before losing 3–2 at home to Boston.

2002–03 saw the club under manager Ian Chapman once again finish in second place, this time to runaway winners Burgess Hill Town. A comparatively modest eighth place followed the next season, but in 2004–05 the Hawks regained their position amongst the leading clubs in the League, finishing just a point behind runners-up Rye & Iden United. The two sides also met in the final of the John O'Hara League Cup and the Hawks emerged as 4–3 winners. However, they were later found to have played an ineligible player in substitute Bertie Foster and therefore Rye were awarded the trophy. The Hawks could only manage third place again in 2005–2006 but reached both the League Cup and RUR Charity Cup finals, losing to Shoreham and Hailsham Town respectively. In 2006–07 The Hawks reached the quarter-final of the FA Vase, losing 1–0 at home to the eventual winners Truro City in front of a crowd of 1,009.

The club finally achieved the league title success that had previously eluded them, winning the Sussex County League Division 1 in 2009–10 under joint managers George Parris and Darren Freeman to gain promotion to the Isthmian League Division One South for the first time. The Hawks also reached the semi-final of the FA Vase, losing 4–1 on aggregate to Wroxham of the Eastern Counties League Premier Division.

=== Isthmian League ===
In their first season at the new level Whitehawk were in the title race but eventually had to settle for third place and the end-of-season play-offs against Leatherhead. The game at The Enclosed Ground ended 1–1 but the visitors won 4–3 on penalties.

The Hawks completed a league and cup double the following season 2011–12, finishing as Isthmian League Division One South champions as well as lifting the Sussex Senior Cup after beating Crawley Down 2–1 at Falmer Stadium. They followed this up later by winning the 2012 Sussex Community Shield in August, with a 4–1 win against Three Bridges. The club had planned to play the 2012–13 season at the Withdean Stadium in order to redevelop The Enclosed Ground but this was blocked by the Isthmian League, who were concerned that the club would not return to East Brighton.

The club achieved back to back promotions in the 2012–13 season by winning the Isthmian League Premier Division at the first attempt to earn a place in the Conference South.

=== National League South ===
For the 2013–14 season, the club sought to change its name to Brighton City Football Club but the FA Council ruled against the proposal.

The Hawks struggled in their first season in Conference South with manager Darren Freeman blaming the physical nature of some of the teams in the league. After achieving three promotions in four years, Freeman was sacked in January 2014 and replaced by Steve King. King ensured the Hawks retained their place in Conference South on a dramatic last day of the season at the Enclosed Ground against Sutton United, with a late equaliser for the Hawks ensuring a 3–3 draw and an even later penalty by Dover Athletic relegating Hayes & Yeading instead. The club enjoyed their most successful season ever in 2014–2015, finishing fourth in Conference South and earning a place in the play-off semi-finals against Basingstoke Town. After a 1–1 draw at the Enclosed Ground, a tremendous strike from fans' player of the year Jake Robinson in the second leg won the match 1–0 to earn a place in the final against Boreham Wood, who had finished second in the league. The play-off final at Boreham Wood's ground finished 1–1 in normal time but an extra time winner for Wood denied the Hawks what would have been their fourth promotion in six seasons. Whitehawk completed the season with a 5–0 victory over Lewes at Falmer Stadium to lift the Sussex Senior Cup, the biggest margin of victory in the final since 1937.

After a good start to the 2015–16 season, the Hawks reached the first round proper of the FA Cup for the first time and achieved national coverage with a 5–3 victory against National League Lincoln City. In the second round the Hawks drew 1–1 at League Two Dagenham & Redbridge, following a dramatic headed goal in added time by Jordan Rose, which was broadcast live by the BBC. In front of a record crowd of 2,174 at the Enclosed Ground, the Hawks lost the second round replay 2–3. To force the match into extra time, Whitehawk again equalised dramatically in added time with a header, this time by Juan Cruz Gotta. The winners of the match already knew that the third-round tie was away to Everton at Goodison Park. The second round replay was broadcast live on national TV by BT Sport.

The club submitted a further application to the Football Association to change their name to Brighton City in December 2015. This application was withdrawn a month later after opposition from fans and chairman John Summers spending time on the terraces at an away game at Chelmsford City.

In February 2016, the club parted company with Steve King after picking up just 9 points from the previous 36 available, a spell which also saw the club fall from 3rd to 13th. Pablo Asensio took over from King as Caretaker Manager, reorganising the squad and playing style to such an extent that after drifting down towards the relegation zone, the Hawks finished the season in style, reaching the play-offs for the second season running, with Asensio named manager of the month for April 2016. In the play-off semi-final against longtime league leaders Ebbsfleet United the Hawks lost 1–2 at the Enclosed Ground, but then won the second leg 2–1 in Kent, before eventually losing on penalties after extra time. Pablo Asensio was appointed in May 2016 as permanent manager on a two-year contract, which was followed by a complete overhaul of the playing staff for the start of the new season.

After a poor start to the 2016–17 season, with only one win in eight games, The Hawks replaced Pablo Asensio with former Eastleigh manager Richard Hill. In Hill's first week in charge he signed five former Eastleigh players and a further two on loan from his old club, before releasing seven Brazilian players signed at the start of the season, the following week. Hawks again reached the first round of the FA Cup but were denied a dramatic winner against Stourbridge in unusual circumstances when Javier Favarel's 30-yard volley was ruled out after referee Robert Whitton blew for full-time with the ball in the air. Stourbridge won the replay 3–0.

After 10 league games in charge, five won and five lost, Hill left to join Aston Villa as a scout, with director of football Alan Payne and player/assistant manager Ben Strevens taking temporary charge of the first team. Defender Paul Reid then stepped up to assist Alan Payne as joint player/manager after Strevens returned to Eastleigh. Payne and Reid were appointed joint managers until the end of the season on 22 December but with the Hawks in the bottom three at the end of January, the club advertised for a new permanent manager and on 1 February appointed former Crystal Palace goalkeeping coach Andy Woodman. In his first managerial post, Woodman oversaw the club's survival in National League South before leaving at the end of the season and being replaced by assistant manager Jimmy Dack. With the club at the bottom of the league after picking up only one point from the first seven games of the 2017–2018 season, Dack resigned, with player/coach Dan Harding taking temporary charge prior to the re-appointment of former boss Steve King on 13 September 2017. Despite a remarkable turnaround in 2018, with the Hawks third in the form table up to mid-April, relegation for only the third time in the club's history was confirmed with a 4–3 defeat at Braintree Town on 17 April. King departed at the end of the season to be replaced by the Hawks' successful U18 manager Jude Macdonald.

=== Isthmian League ===
The Hawks again spent only one season in the Isthmian League Premier Division, this time being relegated on the final day of the 2018–19 season. After a poor start to the 2020–21 season in the Isthmian League South East Division, Ross Standen was appointed manager on 1 November 2020, with former Brighton & Hove Albion player Stuart Tuck as his assistant. In April 2022, with the Hawks Isthmian League status not secure, former Haywards Heath Town boss Shaun Saunders was appointed first team manager with four games of the season left. They were promoted back to the Premier Division in the 2022–23 season, defeating Hythe Town 1–0 in the play-off final. After a 9th place finish back in the Isthmian Premier League, Saunders stood down to be replaced by Ross McNeilly, who resigned after just 13 matches to be replaced by his assistant David Altendorff. He stepped down shortly afterwards when Saunders returned as manager in November 2024. Jay Lovett was appointed manager in June 2026, with Saunders moving into a Director of Football role.

== Club officials ==
Whitehawk FC remains an unincorporated members' association. The club has seen relative success since 2007, when local businessmen John Summers and Peter "Ned" McDonnell were appointed joint vice-chairmen, with Whitehawk playing in the Sussex County League at the time. In 2012, they were named joint chairmen. In 2014, the club's first season in Conference South after consecutive promotions, Jim Collins was appointed chairman, with plans to further improve the club's operations off the field. John Summers took over as chairman for the start of the 2015–16 season and oversaw the most successful season in the club's history, reaching the second round of the FA Cup and the National League South playoffs. He stood down just over a year later, with General Manager Nigel Thornton stepping in on a temporary basis. Steve Allen became chairman in August 2017 with Andy Schofield taking over the role in October 2019. John Summers and Peter McDonnell were appointed joint vice-chairmen again during the 2022–2023 season and then joint chairmen in July 2024.

== Ground ==
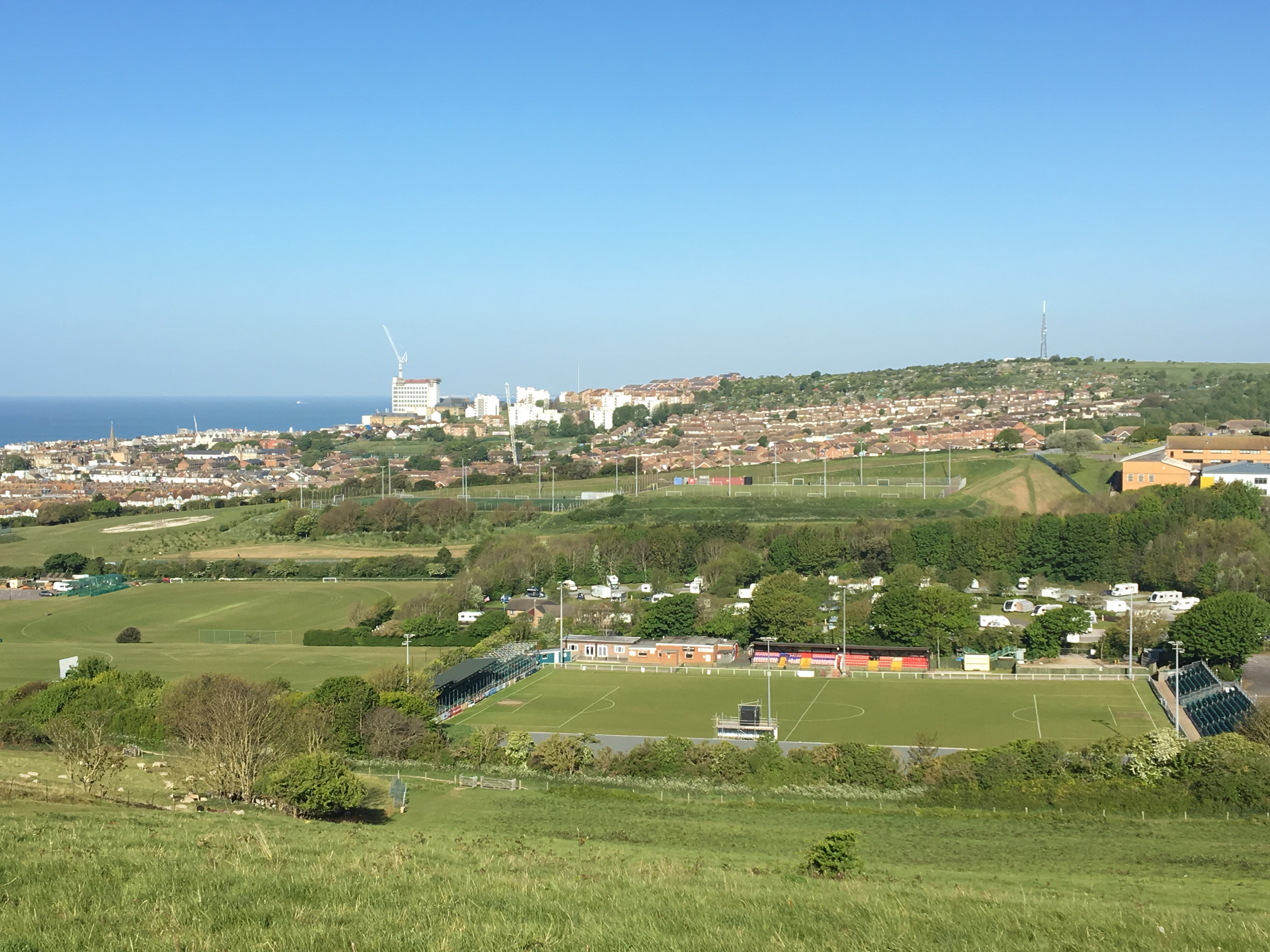
The McLaren Enclosed Ground, East Brighton Park

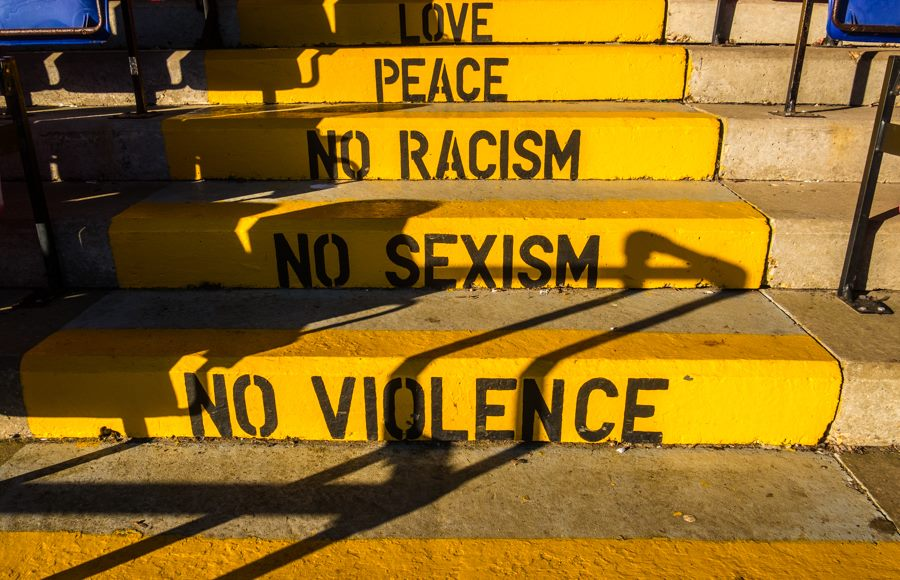
The main stand step detail

Whitehawk have played in East Brighton Park since being founded in 1945, originally on open park pitches owned by Brighton Corporation adjacent to Wilson Avenue. The first time that permission was given to 'enclose' a pitch for a game was on 2 December 1950, for a Sussex Senior Cup third round replay against Crawley, which the Hawks won 3–1. The pitch was enclosed by a series of dark green tarpaulins.

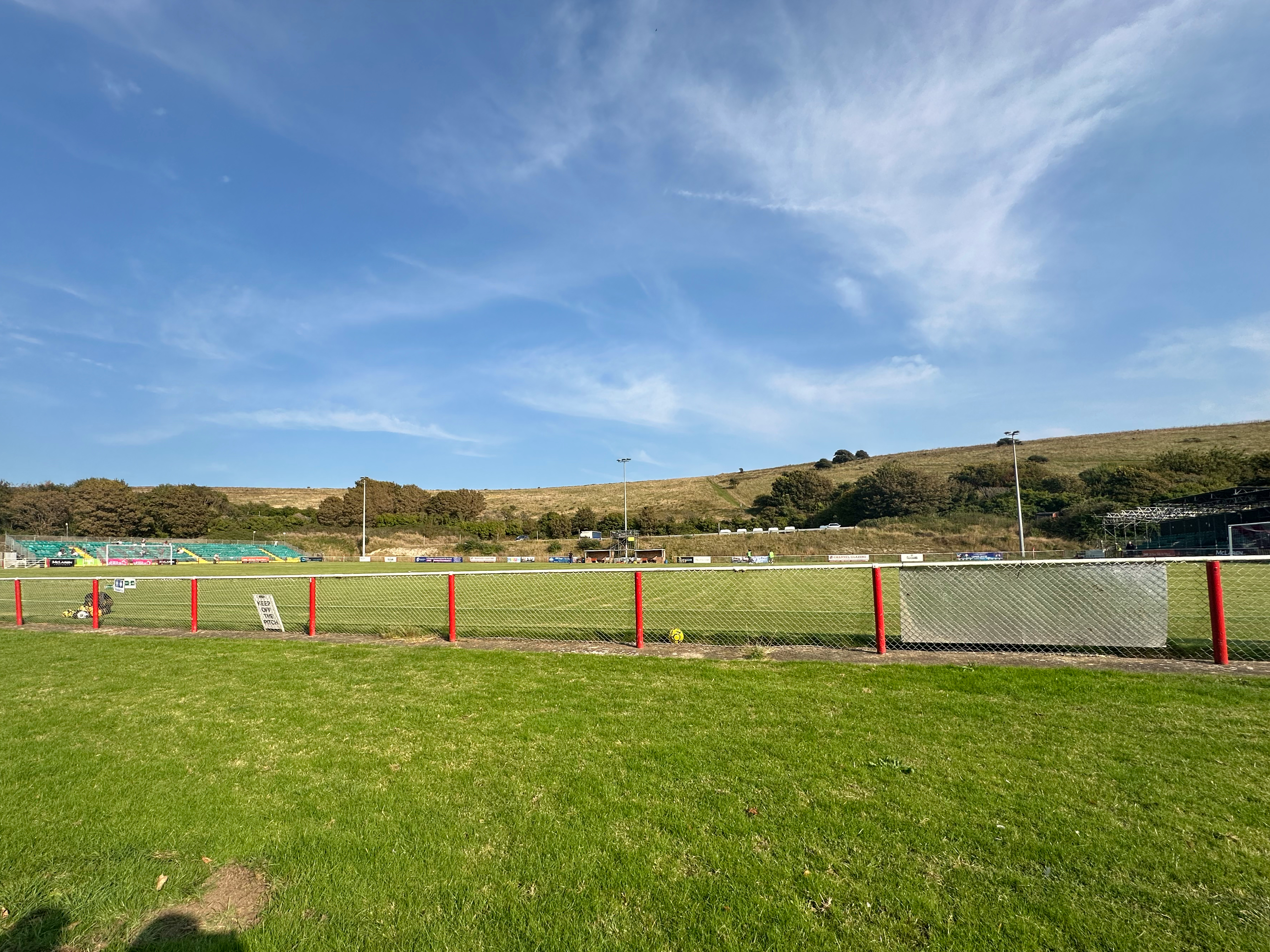
The Enclosed Ground in 2024

A condition of admission to the Sussex County League in 1952 was that all games had to be played in an enclosed ground, and Brighton Corporation gave permission for this to happen on the normally open park pitch in recognition of the club's success and growing following. The first league match played on such a pitch was a Sussex County League Division 1 game against East Grinstead Town on 6 September 1952. The game ended in a 2–2 draw.

For the 1954–55 season, Brighton Corporation allowed the club to move onto a permanently enclosed pitch at the north end of the park, on what is now the Enclosed Ground. The ground was still enclosed by tarpaulins and the teams changed in a barn on the adjacent Sheepcote Valley camping site. The club paid the corporation £75 a season for the pitch and £15 a year for the use of the camp site. There were no facilities for spectators or players on the ground itself. The first match played on the current Enclosed Ground was a Sussex County League Division 1 game against Southwick on 1 September 1954, which the Hawks won 6–2.

After the Hawks did the league and cup double in 1962, the publicity generated by a civic reception at the Royal Pavilion led to Brighton Corporation providing a grant of £3,500 for the club to erect a self-build grandstand with standing for 500 spectators. The design also included changing rooms, which were first used during the 1963–64 season. Brighton Corporation still owned the ground and the club still paid an annual rent for its use.

The club gained its first club house in September 1980, using what was originally a prefabricated building that had been a temporary bank in Haywards Heath. A perimeter fence to the ground was added in 1981. Floodlights were erected in 1988 and were first used in a match organised to mark the occasion against then First Division Luton Town on 21 March 1988.

The Enclosed Ground has seen major redevelopment since 2010 in order it to achieve the necessary grading to be used as a venue in the Isthmian League and National League South. There are now two covered seated stands, one uncovered seated stand and a grass bank along the east touchline.

- Sea End: The north stand has a seating capacity of 1236 and is known as the Sea End because of its views of the English Channel. There are two banks of uncovered seating, which were previously used at Withdean Stadium when Brighton and Hove Albion played there. The stand, or part of it, is used for visiting fans when segregation of the crowd is in force.
- The Din: The south stand, known as the Din and partially covered, has a seating capacity of 800, with 387 seats under cover. As the ground slopes, the stand has been put together in four sections that are at different heights.
- The Main Stand is a small, covered, seated stand on the halfway line adjacent to the clubhouse and backs onto the main turnstiles. It also houses the players' and officials' changing rooms. Seating capacity in this stand is 232. This stand was the club's first, built in 1963, originally as covered terracing. The seating was installed in 2010.

The Enclosed Ground is famous for being set into a steep hillside adjacent to the South Downs National Park as well as sloping downhill towards the sea. The pitch also has a significant drop from one southerly corner flag to the other. It is also very much exposed to the elements, being so close to the sea.

The internet celebrity Wealdstone Raider gained his fame through a viral video filmed by a Whitehawk supporter, which initially showed him shouting out "you've got no fans" from a fence next to the clubhouse during an Isthmian League Premier Division match against Wealdstone, played on 9 March 2013 at the Enclosed Ground. After a Whitehawk supporter speaks to him, he is then seen asking "do you want some?", which became his catchphrase. The Wealdstone Raider (real name Gordon Hill) was involved in recreating the moment at the Enclosed Ground in August 2025 as part of an advertising campaign for itsu, when his catchphrase "do you want some?", was altered to "do you want dim sum?".

In October 2025, the club announced plans for a major redevelopment of the stadium. The project would include a small gym, a refurbished clubhouse and bar, a new events suite and a fan zone, in addition to the installation of a 3G pitch.

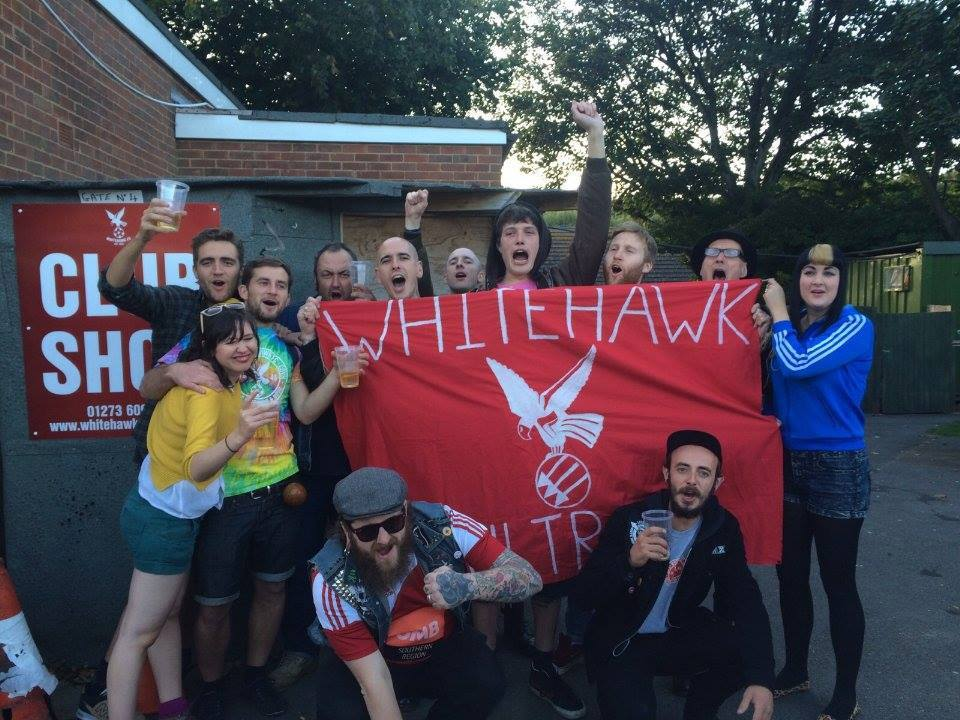
Whitehawk Ultras following a home game against Dulwich Hamlet

== Supporters ==
A section of Whitehawk's fans call themselves the Whitehawk Ultras. The Ultras aim to have fun, as well as espousing an “anti-homophobic, anti-sexist, anti-racist stance.” They promote local charitable causes, non-league football and togetherness, as an antidote to what they see as the commercialised world of the Premier League. The Ultras have links with similar other fans groups such as Eastbourne Town's Pier Pressure and have a number of original songs and rituals. Whitehawk fans have been documented since 2014 by Brighton photographer JJ Waller.

== Sponsors ==
The first team wear shirts sponsored by McLaren Property. First team track suits and youth team shirts are sponsored by Brighton Couriers.

== Players ==
=== Current squad ===
Note: Flags indicate national team as defined under FIFA eligibility rules; some limited exceptions apply. Players may hold more than one non-FIFA nationality.

No.	Pos.	Nation	Player
—	GK	SVK	Hugo Fisher
—	GK	ENG	Henry Molynuex (on loan from Cray Wanderers)
—	DF	ANT	Dan Bowry
—	DF	ENG	Tresor Difika
—	DF	ENG	Grant Hall
—	DF	ENG	Ezra Ikebuasi
—	DF	ENG	Nikolai Krokhin
—	DF	ENG	Junior Nkwonta
—	DF	ENG	Dami Olorunnisomo
—	DF	ENG	Adam Reeves (on loan from Sutton United)
—	MF	ENG	Victor Aiye
—	MF	ENG	Beaux Booth
—	MF	ENG	Finlay Chadwick

No.	Pos.	Nation	Player
—	MF	FRA	Yanis Drais
—	MF	GHA	Daniel Fosu
—	MF	ENG	Nabeel Ghannam
—	MF	ENG	Marco Haigh (on loan from Horsham)
—	MF	ENG	Arezki Hamouchene
—	MF	ENG	Matty Jones
—	MF	KOR	Seokjae Lee
—	FW	ENG	Luke Cook
—	FW	ENG	Mehmet Halim
—	FW	PAK	Imran Kayani
—	FW	ENG	Rhys Murphy
—	FW	ENG	Kamarni Ryan

=== Out on loan/on dual registration ===
Note: Flags indicate national team as defined under FIFA eligibility rules; some limited exceptions apply. Players may hold more than one non-FIFA nationality.

No.	Pos.	Nation	Player

== Former players ==
The list comprises former players who have made 75 or more appearances in a fully professional league or have senior international experience.

- (Northern Ireland) Gerry Armstrong
- (Republic of Ireland) Paul Armstrong
- (Kenya) Eugene Asike
- (England) Elliot Benyon
- (Montserrat) Craig Braham-Barrett
- (England) Russell Bromage
- (England) Steve Brown
- (England) Glenn Burvill
- (Republic of Ireland) John Byrne
- (England) Richard Carpenter
- (England) Ian Chapman
- (England) Sam Deering
- (Senegal) Seny Dieng
- (England) Scott Doe
- (Egypt) Adam El-Abd
- (Jamaica) Marvin Elliott
- (England) Jay Emmanuel-Thomas
- (England) Hogan Ephraim
- (France) Dylan Fage
- (England) Gerry Fell
- (England) Tommy Fraser
- (England) Darren Freeman
- (Guyana) Liam Gordon
- (New Zealand) Liam Graham
- (Sri Lanka) Marvin Hamilton
- (England) Dan Harding
- (England) Brian Howard
- (Portugal) Edinho Júnior
- (The Gambia) Pa Saikou Kujabi
- (England) Matthew Lawrence
- (England) Dean Leacock
- (Jamaica) Kevin Lisbie
- (Dominica) Jefferson Louis
- (England) Jay Lovett
- (England) Kevin Maher
- (Guyana) Ronayne Marsh-Brown
- (England) Dave Martin
- (England) Teddy Maybank
- (England) Scott McGleish
- (Saint Vincent and the Grenadines) Chevron McLean
- (Guinea-Bissau) Arnaud Mendy
- (Cameroon) Manny Monthé
- (Jamaica) Junior Morias
- (England) Elliot Omozusi
- (England) Dillon Phillips
- (England) Steve Piper
- (England) Adam Proudlock
- (England) Paul Reid
- (England) Jake Robinson
- (Bermuda) Luke Robinson
- (England) Richard Rose
- (Brazil) Raphael Rossi Branco
- (Afghanistan) Taufee Skandari
- (England) Alex South
- (British Virgin Islands) Javaun Splatt
- (England) Danny Stevens
- (Saint Kitts and Nevis) Jason St Juste
- (England) Ben Strevens
- (Montserrat) Joey Taylor
- (Argentina) Sergio Torres
- (England) Stuart Tuck
- (Northern Ireland) Kyle Vassell
- (England) Jed Wallace
- (England) Lewis Ward
- (England) Chris Whelpdale
- (England) Gary Williams
- (Montserrat) Bradley Woods-Garness
- (Australia) Jamie Young

For a complete list of current and former Whitehawk players with Wikipedia articles, see Category:Whitehawk F.C. players.

== Managers ==
- Bert Brown (1945–1948)
- Ron James (1948–1952)
- Bill Day (1952–1956)
- Albert Thorne (1956-1958)
- Harry Sargent (1958–1959)
- Billy Thew (1959–1962)
- Ken Carter (1962–1964)
- Glen Wilson (1964-1965)
- Ron Pavey (1965-1967)
- Bill Miller (1967–1968)
- Mike Yaxley (1968–1969)
- Paul Harris (1969–1970)
- Jack Bertolini (1970-1971)
- John Marchant (1971–1973)
- John Booth (1973–1974)
- John Marchant & Ken Longhurst (1974–1975)
- Ray Allcorn (1975-1976)
- Ray Allcorn & Dick Watts (1976)
- Dick Watts (1976)
- Henry Wood (1976–1978)
- Rodney Ralfe (1978–1980)
- Brian 'Sammy' Donnelly (1980–1984)
- Tony 'Butch' Reeves (1984–1988)
- Brian 'Sammy' Donnelly (1988–1992)
- Tony 'Butch' Reeves (1992–1996)
- Paul Hubbard (1996–2001)
- Colin Jenkinson (2001)
- Steve Richardson (2001)
- Ian Chapman & Glenn Burvill (2001)
- Ian Chapman (2002–2007)
- Russell Bromage (2007–2008)
- George Parris (2008–2009)
- George Parris & Darren Freeman (2009–2010)
- Darren Freeman (2010–2014)
- Colin Reid (2014; caretaker)
- Steve King (2014–2016)
- Pablo Asensio (2016)
- Richard Hill (2016)
- Ben Strevens & Alan Payne (2016)
- Paul Reid & Alan Payne (2016–2017)
- Andy Woodman (2017)
- Jimmy Dack (2017)
- Dan Harding (2017; caretaker)
- Steve King (2017–2018)
- Jude Macdonald (2018–2020)
- Ross Standen (2020–2022)
- Shaun Saunders (2022–2024)
- Ross McNeilly (2024)
- David Altendorff (2024)
- Shaun Saunders (2024–2026)
- Jay Lovett (2026)
- Rob Kember (2026-)

== First Team management ==
Men's First Team
Manager	Rob Kember
Assistant Managers	Stuart Booth & Rob Smith
Coach	Dean Sammut
Head Physiotherapist	Velichka Atanasova

Women's First Team
Director of Football	George Parris
Manager	Ian Hickley-Smith
Coach	Pam Chandler
Secretary	Michelle Fogden

== Senior Club Leaders and Officials ==
Co Chairmen	Ned McDonnell & John Summers
Co Vice-Chairs	Michele Fogden & Kay Stringer
Digital Operations Manager	Henry Summers
Director of Football	Shaun Saunders
Secretary & Treasurer	John Rosenblatt
President & Historian	Andy Schofield
Vice-President	David Shrigley
Commercial Manager	Adam Bradley
Head of Media	Alex Rathbone
Events Manager	Gemma Beaver
Deputy Events Manager	Andy Gully
Match Reporter	Sean Farley

Source: www.whitehawkfc.com

== Honours ==
=== League honours ===
- Isthmian League Premier Division
  - Winners (1): 2012–13
- Isthmian League Division One South
  - Winners (1): 2011–12
- Isthmian League South East Division
  - Play-off Winners (1): 2022–23
- Sussex County Football League Division One
  - Winners (4): 1961–62, 1963–64, 1983–84, 2009–10
  - Runners-up (8): 1954–55, 1955–56, 1956–57, 1986–87, 1993–94, 2002–03, 2006–07, 2007–08
- Sussex County Football League Division Two
  - Winners (2): 1967–68, 1980–81
- Brighton, Hove & District Football League Division 1
  - Winners (3): 1950–51, 1951–52, 1958-59 (Reserves)
- Brighton, Hove & District Football League Division 2
  - Winners (1): 1949–50
- Brighton, Hove & District Football League Division 3
  - Runners up (1): 1948–49
- Brighton, Hove & District Football League Division 4
  - Winners (1): 1947–48
- Brighton Junior Cup
  - Winners (1): 1945–46

=== Cup honours ===
- Sussex Senior Cup
  - Winners (4): 1950–51, 1961–62, 2011–12, 2014–15
  - Runners-up (2): 1953–54, 1971–72
- Sussex RUR Cup
  - Winners (3): 1954–55, 1958–59, 1990–91
  - Runners-up (3): 1956–57, 2005–06, 2006–07
- John O'Hara League Challenge Cup
  - Winners (3): 1982–83, 1993–94, 2008–09
  - Runners-up (1): 2004–05
- Sussex Intermediate Cup
  - Winners (1): 1949–50
- Sussex Junior Cup
  - Winners (2): 1947–48, 1948–49
- Hove & Worthing Cup
  - Winners (1): 1945–46
- Sussex Community Shield
  - Winners (1): 2012
  - Runners-up (1): 2015

== Club records ==
=== Wins ===
- 14-0 A v Southdown, Sussex Junior Cup 2nd Round, 27 March 1948
- 12-0 H v Bexhill Town Athletic, Sussex County League Division 1, 23 September 1961 (Scorers: Billy Ford 7, Harry Tharme, Rodney Ralfe, Allan Gunn, Maurice Barker 2. Barker also missed a penalty) (senior football)
- 12-1 H v Seaford Town, Sussex Senior Cup 2nd Round, 1961-62 (senior cup football)

=== Defeats ===
- 2-13 A v St Luke's Terrace Old Boys, Brighton & Hove District League Division 2, 2 November 1946
- 0-9 H v Arundel, Sussex County League Division 1, 2 November 1957 (senior football)
- 1-9 A v Billericay Town, FA Cup 3rd qualifying round, 6 October 2018 (senior cup football)

=== Highest league placing ===
- Conference South, 4th (and play-off finalists A v Boreham Wood, lost 1–2 after extra time), 2014–15

=== FA Cup ===
- Second Round Replay H, lost 2–3 after extra time v Dagenham & Redbridge, 16 December 2015

=== FA Amateur Cup ===
- Fourth qualifying round replay A, lost 1–2 after extra time v Erith & Belvedere, 21 November 1953

=== FA Trophy ===
- Third Round 2–3, A v Hythe Town, 12 December 2023

=== FA Vase ===
- Semi-finals v Wroxham, 28 March 2010 (H) lost 0-2 and 3 April 2010 (A) lost 1–2. The away leg is a record attendance (1262) for Wroxham

=== Playing record ===
- 1951-52, Brighton & Hove District League Senior Division 1 Champions: P26, W24, D2, L0, F125, A30, Pts50

=== Most goals in a season ===
- 127 (32 matches), 1961–62 season, Sussex County League Division 1 Champions

=== Attendance ===
- 2,174, FA Cup round 2 Replay v Dagenham & Redbridge, 16 December 2015

== Popular Culture ==
In September 2023, the documentary film Hawks – Anti-Idiots, directed by Hossam Sarhan, premiered at the Brighton Rocks International Film Festival. Produced in collaboration with Al Jazeera Documentary, the film explores the intersection of sports and social justice by following the club's fans, the Whitehawk Ultras, during their successful 2022–23 promotion campaign to the Isthmian League Premier Division.
