= Maria Asensio =

Spanish-Argentine physical chemist

María Carmen Asensio
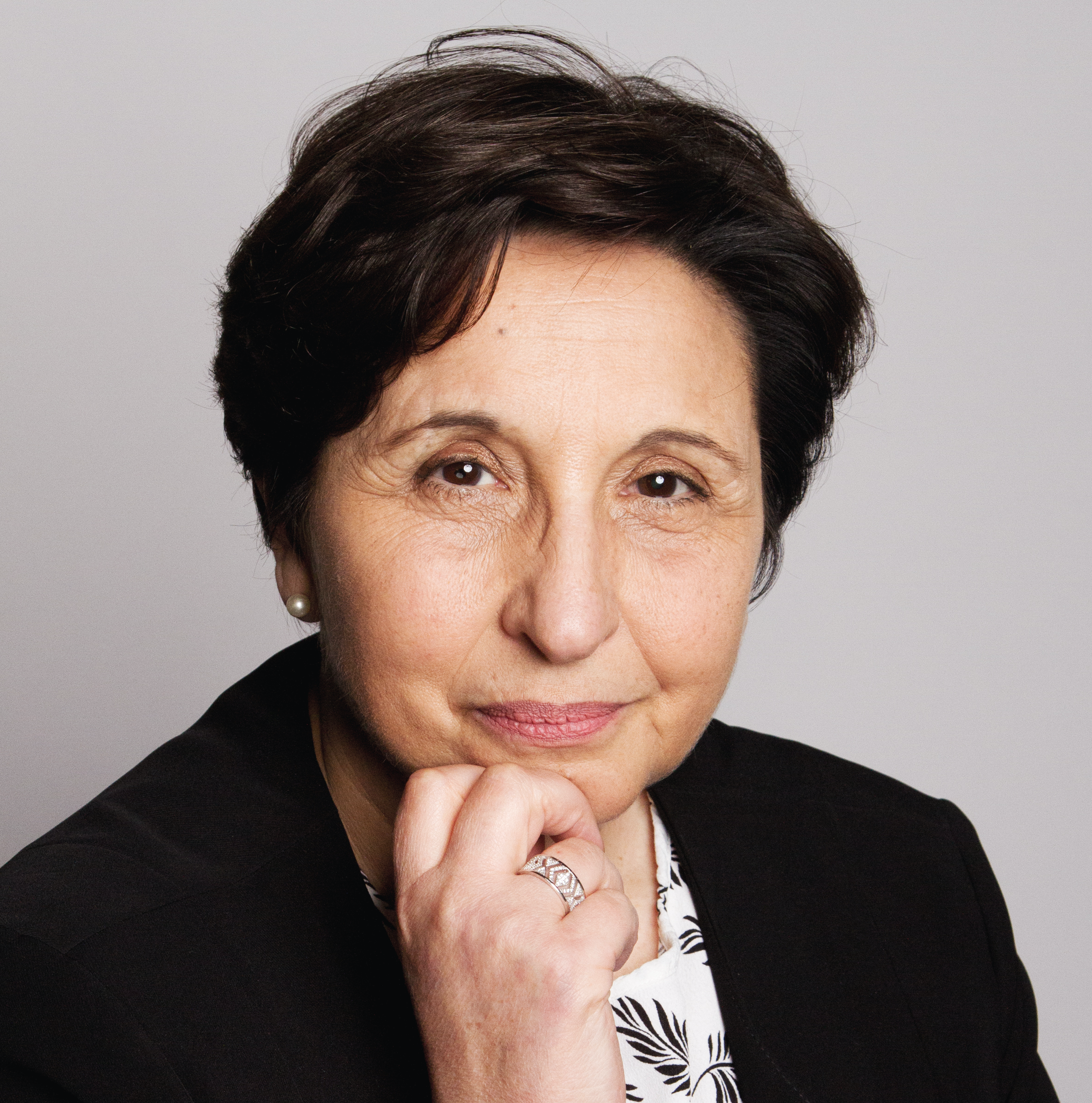
- Born: 9 February 1955 (age 71)
- Occupations: Physical chemist, academic, researcher, and author
- Awards: Hans Schumacher Award, Argentine Association for Physicochemical Research (AAIFQ); Fellowship, Centre International des Etudiants et Stagiaires (C.I.E.S.); Distinguished visiting lecturer 2021, University of Nebraska–Lincoln

Academic background
- Education: Nacional University of La Plata; Institute of Theoretical and Applied Physicochemical Research (INIFTA); National Scientific and Technical Research Council (CONICET)

Academic work
- Institutions: Materials Science Institute of Madrid (ICMM), Spanish Scientific Research Council(CSIC)

Maria C. Asensio is a Spanish-Argentine physical chemist, academic, researcher, and author. She is a Full Research Professor at the Materials Science Institute of Madrid (ICMM) of the Spanish National Research Council (CSIC) and Chair of the CSIC Research Associated Unit-MATINÉE created between the ICMM and the Institute of Materials Science (ICMUV) of the Valencia University.

Asensio's work is focused on the characterization of advanced materials, developing spectroscopic instrumentation, and the use of artificial intelligence tools for discovering sustainable energy materials. She is best known for her contribution in chemical and electronic imaging of nano- and mesoscopic materials, using nano Angle-Resolved Photoemission Spectroscopy (Nano-ARPES) and X-ray Absorption Spectroscopy (XAS), among other conventional experimental characterization techniques. She has also worked on the experimental determination of the structure of complex materials using effective energy and angular scanning photoelectron Diffraction spectroscopic techniques.

Asensio has published over 250 research articles.

== Education ==
In 1980, Asensio graduated with a degree in physical chemistry from the La Plata National University. From 1981 to 1986, she carried out her doctoral thesis work at the Institute of Theoretical and Applied Physicochemical Research (INIFTA), receiving Ph.D. degree from the National University of La Plata. She earned her postdoctoral degree from the Autonomous University of Madrid in 1987 and Warwick University in 1989.

== Career ==
After moving to Europe, Asensio was an assistant professor at the Autonomous University of Madrid (UAM) from 1988 to 1989 and worked as a Postgraduate lecturer at the European Hercules from 1992 to 1999 at LURE Synchrotron, Orsay, France. She also was a lecturer of the Postgraduate of the Condensed Matter Programme of the Sciences Faculty of the UAM and the Complutense University of Madrid, during 1992 and 1999.

Asensio has been working as a senior scientist at ICMM-CSIC since 1992, with a prolonged leave of eleven years. From 2007 to 2018, she was working as a permanent scientific staff of the Synchrotron SOLEIL, in Gif-sur-Yvette, France.

Asensio was elected as the International Union for Vacuum Science, Technique, and Applications (IUVSTA) Scientific Director from 2004 to 2007. She has chaired the Surface Science Division of the IUVSTA from 2019 to the present. She currently works as a Full Professor Research Staff Member at the Materials Science Institute of Madrid.

== Research ==
Asensio's research is focused on studying the chemical, structural, and electronic structure of surfaces, interfaces, and quantum materials utilizing synchrotron radiation techniques. For several decades, she has worked on the applications and development of scientific instrumentation in Large European Synchrotron Radiation Installations.

=== Development of synchrotron radiation scientific instrumentation ===
Asensio has worked on the use, applications, and development of scientific instrumentation in Large European Synchrotron Radiation Installations. After the LURE's closure and the Synchrotron SOLEIL's construction as the new national source of SR, Asensio designed and built an SR station to perform the Nano-ARPES technique. In 2011, the first short scientific article appeared, showing a few incipient advances in the design of the "Nanometre multi-axis manipulator with interferometer control." that later led to the success of the nanoARPES instrument at the ANTARES beamline of the SOLEIL Synchrotron. The results obtained with the instrumentation developed at the ANTARES beamline demonstrated the Project's feasibility, resulting in the proof of concept of the nanoARPES Project. This novel technique is a k-nanoscope technique that allows a direct and precise determination of the electronic structure recording the "with binding energy (BE) vs. k wave vector" plots and Fermi surface imaging of heterogeneous complex materials with a lateral resolution better than 100 nm.

Asensio developed a new method entitled the ANTARES beamline of the SOLEIL synchrotron. This method is a multi-axis manipulator with interferometer control and provides an X-ray nanoprobe. She also introduced several ways to characterize the chemical and electronic heterogeneities from the millimetre to the nanometre scale, as well as to address several mesoscopic scientific problems. She used complementary synchrotron and theoretical approaches to address the electrical characteristics of the coordination complex nickel (II) bis-n-propyl xanthate, and to understand the reactivity of coordination chemistry. Later, she conducted ARPES studies on a heterostructure made of bilayer graphene (BLG) and hexagonal boron nitride (hBN), which is back gated with an underlying graphite flake, with submicron spatial resolution among other contributions.

=== Nanoscience and Nano-ARPES ===
Asensio's research includes the electronic and chemical characterization of novel low-dimensional quantum materials like Graphene, hBN, transition metal dichalcogenide (TMD), transition metal trichalcogenide (TMT), Xenes, and in particular, silicene and the Nano-ARPES approach, and their atomically controlled homo- and hetero-structures, using conventional and synchrotron radiation-based techniques. Out of all the articles she had, her research on silicene has received the most citations, totalling 3613. She has been focusing on the operation of the Nano-ARPES user facility constructed at the SOLEIL synchrotron over the past ten years. She worked on manybody effects detected by photoemission on low-dimensional materials compiling model photoemission simulation and experimental Nano-ARPES results to unravel collective excitations involving polarons, plasmons, phonons and other low-energy interactions. She analyzed the relationship between the element's wave-function nature and the excited-state, self-energy effects.

=== Electronic Structures of low-dimensional materials beyond graphene ===
Asensio has been involved in improving the characteristics of materials and identifying corrosion mechanisms. She discovered the efficiency of scientific instrumentation in permitting realistic solutions for unusually complicated materials. She highlighted the utility of artificially twisted graphene bilayers that are adaptable, affordable building blocks. She conducted an in-depth study about commercially available copper foil that has developed into an effective and affordable catalytic substrate for the scalable synthesis of large-area graphene sheets. She also confirmed the high quality of the individual square graphene sheets and their merged regions by using angle-resolved photoemission spectroscopy with a submicron spatial resolution (Micro-ARPES) to study the three-dimensional electronic structures of square graphene sheets grown on copper foils. In her studies, she analysed the quasi-one-dimensional monophosphate structure of tungsten. She observed three states at the tungsten Fermi level, two of which are two-dimensional and one of which has one-dimensional characteristics. She also untangled the interlayer hybridization of Dirac relativistic carriers in Graphene/MoS2 heterostructures. She clarified the effect of the electron-plasmon coupling on the silicon satellite band structure. She discovered electronic properties of topological insulator Sb_{2}Te_{3} nanowires responsible for their quantum transport using high energy and lateral resolution Nano-ARPES, among other contributions to Condensed Matter Physics.

== Awards and honors ==
- 1986-1987 - Postdoctoral fellowship, CONICET to perform the research work at the UAM
- 1987- Hans Schumacher Award, Argentine Association for Physicochemical Research (AAIFQ) to the best thesis "Interaction of water with thin Cu films"
- 1991-1992 - Fellowship, Centre International des Etudiants et Stagiaires (C.I.E.S.) to realize research work at the Synchrotron LURE, Orsay, Ile de France, France.
- 1992-1993 - Two fellowships were granted by the French "Scientific Research National Center" (CNRS) to support stays at the Synchrotron LURE, Orsay, Ile de France, France.
- 2004-2007 - Scientific Director of the IUVSTA.
- 2016–Present - Chair of the Surface Science Section, IUVSTA
- 2021 - Distinguished visiting lecturer 2021, University of Nebraska–Lincoln

== Bibliography ==
- Avila, J.; Mascaraque, A.; Michel, E.G.; Asensio, M.C. (January 1998). "Phase transition of submonolayer Pb/Ge(111): α−3×3R30° ↔ 3 × 3at∼ 250 K". Applied Surface Science. 123–124: 626–630. doi:10.1016/S0169-4332(97)00564-3.
- Asensio, M. C.; Avila, J.; Roca, L.; Tejeda, A.; Gu, G. D.; Lindroos, M.; Markiewicz, R. S.; Bansil, A. (22 January 2003). "Emergence of multiple Fermi surface maps in angle-resolved photoemission from Bi_{2}⁢Sr_{2}⁢CaCu_{2}⁢O_{8+𝛿}". Physical Review B. 67 (1) 014519. doi:10.1103/PhysRevB.67.014519.
- Vogt, Patrick; De Padova, Paola; Quaresima, Claudio; Avila, Jose; Frantzeskakis, Emmanouil; Asensio, Maria Carmen; Resta, Andrea; Ealet, Bénédicte; Le Lay, Guy (12 April 2012). "Silicene: Compelling Experimental Evidence for Graphenelike Two-Dimensional Silicon". Physical Review Letters. 108 (15) 155501. Bibcode:2012PhRvL.108o5501V. doi:10.1103/PhysRevLett.108.155501. PMID 22587265.
- Avila, José; Asensio, María C. (4 March 2014). "First NanoARPES User Facility Available at SOLEIL: An Innovative and Powerful Tool for Studying Advanced Materials". Synchrotron Radiation News. 27 (2): 24–30. Bibcode:2014SRNew..27...24A. doi:10.1080/08940886.2014.889549.
- Brown, Lola; Lochocki, Edward B.; Avila, José; Kim, Cheol-Joo; Ogawa, Yui; Havener, Robin W.; Kim, Dong-Ki; Monkman, Eric J.; Shai, Daniel E.; Wei, Haofei I.; Levendorf, Mark P.; Asensio, María; Shen, Kyle M.; Park, Jiwoong (8 October 2014). "Polycrystalline Graphene with Single Crystalline Electronic Structure". Nano Letters. 14 (10): 5706–5711. Bibcode:2014NanoL..14.5706B. doi:10.1021/nl502445j. PMID 25207847.
- Deokar, G.; Avila, J.; Razado-Colambo, I.; Codron, J.-L.; Boyaval, C.; Galopin, E.; Asensio, M.-C.; Vignaud, D. (August 2015). "Towards high quality CVD graphene growth and transfer". Carbon. 89: 82–92. Bibcode:2015Carbo..89...82D. doi:10.1016/j.carbon.2015.03.017.
- Ma, Yujing; Diaz, Horacio Coy; Avila, José; Chen, Chaoyu; Kalappattil, Vijaysankar; Das, Raja; Phan, Manh-Huong; Čadež, Tilen; Carmelo, José M. P.; Asensio, Maria C.; Batzill, Matthias (6 February 2017). "Angle resolved photoemission spectroscopy reveals spin charge separation in metallic MoSe2 grain boundary". Nature Communications. 8 (1) 14231. doi:10.1038/ncomms14231. PMC 5303875. PMID 28165445.
- Nguyen, Van Luan; Duong, Dinh Loc; Lee, Sang Hyub; Avila, José; Han, Gyeongtak; Kim, Young-Min; Asensio, Maria C.; Jeong, Se-Young; Lee, Young Hee (October 2020). "Layer-controlled single-crystalline graphene film with stacking order via Cu–Si alloy formation". Nature Nanotechnology. 15 (10): 861–867. Bibcode:2020NatNa..15..861N. doi:10.1038/s41565-020-0743-0. PMID 32719494.
- Hallot, Maxime; Caja-Munoz, Borja; Leviel, Clement; Lebedev, Oleg I.; Retoux, Richard; Avila, José; Roussel, Pascal; Asensio, Maria Carmen; Lethien, Christophe (7 April 2021). "Atomic Layer Deposition of a Nanometer-Thick Li 3 PO 4 Protective Layer on LiNi 0.5 Mn 1.5 O 4 Films: Dream or Reality for Long-Term Cycling?". ACS Applied Materials & Interfaces. 13 (13): 15761–15773. Bibcode:2021AAMI...1315761H. doi:10.1021/acsami.0c21961. PMID 33765380.
- Dávila, M. E.; Ávila, J.; Colambo, I. R.; Putungan, D. B.; Woodruff, D. P.; Asensio, M. C. (22 July 2021). "New insight on the role of localisation in the electronic structure of the Si(111)(7 × 7) surfaces". Scientific Reports. 11 (1) 15034. Bibcode:2021NatSR..1115034D. doi:10.1038/s41598-021-94664-w. PMC 8298386. PMID 34294856.
