= Ángel Fernández de los Ríos =

Spanish politician, journalist, writer, and urbanist

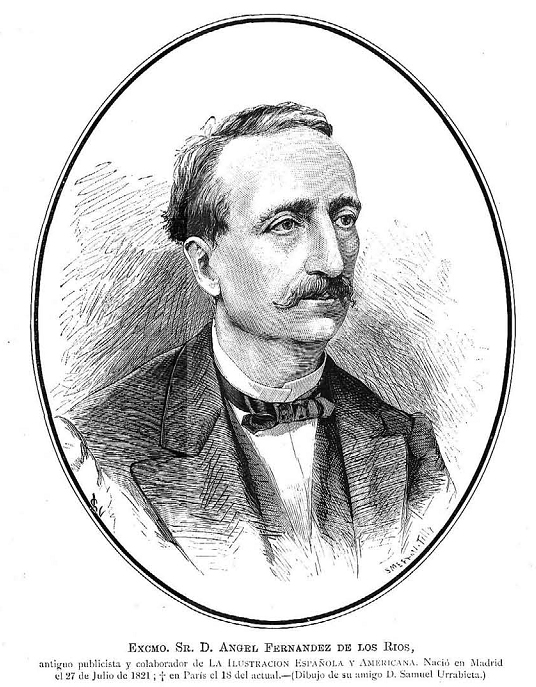
- Sr. D. Ángel Fernández de los Ríos, in La Ilustración Española y Americana (30 June 1880)

Senator for Santander
- In office 1871–1873

Ambassador to Portugal
- In office July 1869 – 1873

Personal details
- Born: 27 July 1821 Madrid, Spain
- Died: 18 June 1880 (aged 58) Paris, France
- Occupation: politician, journalist, writer and urbanist

Ángel Fernández de los Ríos (27 July 1821 – 18 June 1880) was a Spanish politician, journalist, writer, and urbanist.

== Political career ==
Ángel Fernández de los Ríos joined the National Militia in 1842. He became a member of the Progressive Party (Partido Progresista). He was among the centrist group formed by the puros, who included Baldomero Espartero (1793–1879), Salustiano de Olózaga y Almandoz (1805–1873), Pedro Calvo Asensio (1821–1863), and Patricio de la Escosura (1807–1878). They advocated an advanced liberal policy to consolidate the gains of the bourgeois revolution. He took part in the insurrectionist movements against the 1847–1849 Government of General Ramón María Narváez, 1st Duke of Valencia.

Fernández de los Ríos was a member of the committee that prepared to 17 July 1854 pronouncement at the start of the Spanish Revolution of 1854. Other members were Antonio Cánovas del Castillo (1828–1897), Antonio de los Ríos Rosas (1812–1873) and the Marquis de la Vega de Armijo (1824–1908). Later in July he was elected secretary of the Board of Salvation, Armament and Defense, chaired by General Evaristo Fernández de San Miguel (1785–1862).

During the periodo progresista (progressive period) that followed Fernández de los Ríos joined the opposition when General Leopoldo O'Donnell prevented the revolution from developing. In March 1856 he was one of the founders of the Progressive group of the puros, opposed to the Parliamentary group, or right-wing progressives, of Juan Prim (1814–1870), Álvarez Cantero, and Pedro Gómez de la Serna (1806–1871). Most members of the Parliamentary group later joined General O'Donnell's Unión Liberal (Liberal Union) party.

The manifesto of the Progressive group named General Baldomero Espartero as its leader, hoping that would hold the movement together against defections to the left (demócratas) and the right (resellados). In 1865 Fernández de los Ríos became secretary of the Central Committee of the Progressive Party, chaired by Espartero. He was involved in organizing the unsuccessful 1866 insurrection of the San Gil barracks, and he had to go into exile to France. He remained there until the triumph of the September Revolution of 1868, then returned to Spain in 1869.

At the request of the (1868–1869) provisional Government, led by Francisco Serrano (1810–1885), Fernández de los Ríos moved to Portugal to negotiate with Ferdinand II of Portugal (1816–1885), father of King Luís I of Portugal (r. 1861–1889), over his candidacy for the Spanish throne. This was supported by General Juan Prim, by the progressives and by the cimbrio sector of the Democratic Party, headed by Nicolás María Rivero (1814–1878). The negotiation did not succeed since Ferdinand, whom he met in May 1870, feared the result could be the loss of Portuguese independence.

Fernández de los Ríos supported the proclamation of the First Spanish Republic (1873–1874). After the Bourbon monarchy was restored with Alfonso XII of Spain (r. 1874–1885), he was accused of being an agent in the service of Manuel Ruiz Zorrilla, leader of the Radical Party and an opponent of the monarchy. In 1876 he was exiled and moved to Portugal, then to France, where he lived until his death in 1880.

== Works ==
- Estudios en la emigración. El futuro Madrid (in Spanish), ver boletín bibliográfico, 1868
- Guía de Madrid (in Spanish), 1875
- Mi misión en Portugal (in Spanish), 1876
- La Exposición Universal de 1878 (in Spanish)
- El Itinerario Pintoresco de París a Madrid (in Spanish), 1845
- El álbum biográfico (in Spanish), 1849
- La Tierra (in Spanish), 1841
- Muñoz Torrero (in Spanish), 1864
- O Todo o Nada (in Spanish), 1864
- Estudio político y biográfico sobre Olózaga (in Spanish), 1863
- Luchas políticas en la España del siglo XIX (in Spanish) (1 ed.), 1864
- Luchas políticas en la España del siglo XIX (in Spanish) (2 ed.), 1879

== Sources ==
- Ruiza, M.; Fernández, T.; Tamaro, E. (2004), "Biografia de Ángel Fernández de los Ríos", Biografías y Vidas. La enciclopedia biográfica en línea (in Spanish), Barcelona, Spain
