= JJ Waller =

British photographer

JJ Waller is a British photographer who has made street photographs of Brighton—his home town—and other seaside towns. He is best known for his portraits of people in Brighton during the 2020 COVID-19 lockdown.

== Performer ==
Waller grew up in Stoke Newington and Brighton. After leaving school, he trained as a drama teacher and then worked on a community arts project in Liverpool. While in the city he developed a comedy act which he would perform at street parties and events and then developed it to become a street entertainer, at first in London's Covent Garden. Billed as "Captain JJ Waller Unusualist".

The University of Kent holds material by Waller as part of the British Stand-Up Comedy Archive. The collection focuses on Waller's career as a performer. The archive contains a flyer which describes his act as including "Eating a Live Human Being" and an escapology routine, in which "suspended from the ceiling in a straight jacket singing "My Way" JJ escapes from the jacket and jumps head first into an egg without breaking the yolk." The collection also has a photograph of another act, "'The Bed of Nails' where Waller balanced two London double-decker buses whilst lying on a bed of nails" a stunt he also performed on the royal wedding edition of Runaround.

Waller spent most of the 1980s working as an act in comedy clubs. He then joined the French circus Archaos, as front-of-house manager, until the company's tent was destroyed by a gale in Dublin in 1991.

== Photography ==
In the 1990s, Waller took an evening class in photography, then a degree in editorial photography at the University of Brighton. After finishing his degree, he spent twelve months as Artist in Residence at Gatwick Airport. He then worked as assistant to Magnum photographer Paul Lowe. Waller subsequently spent a number of years as a photography producer in the advertising industry.

=== Brighton ===
Between 2014 and 2017, Waller produced three volumes of books on Brighton.

In 2014, he documented Whitehawk Football Club, when they played their first season in the Conference South. He also regularly photographed Brighton and Hove Albion, following the club's move from the old Goldstone Ground to the new stadium at Falmer. In 2017, he published these photographs in JJ Waller's Brighton & Hove Albion.

In 2018, Waller published a book on Brighton Pride.

In July–August 2023, Waller staged an open-air exhibition of his Brighton photographs on the seafront beside the West Pier.

=== Elsewhere ===
In 2014 and 2022 he published volumes on St Leonards-on-Sea. In 2017, he produced a volume on Blackpool. Later, he began to photograph the British in Benidorm, Spain. In November 2018, Waller documented Bonfire Night across Sussex. Rather than photographing the celebration itself, he made before and after images of the bonfires.

In August 2024, Waller was Sidmouth School of Art's photographer in residence during the Folk Festival. In the autumn, Waller returned to Sidmouth to create an exhibition of his photographs, which were displayed around the town.

=== JJ Waller's Lockdown ===
From March until May 2020, Waller made around 100 informal portraits of people isolated in their homes during the Covid Lockdown. The photographs, taken in Brighton and Hove, St Leonards, Hastings and Firle were almost all shot through windows. His subjects included "a woman holding her newborn baby against the pane of her door, a crouching couple peering out from the front of their house, and an entire family posing in the colours of a local non-league football team."

Martin Parr edited a book, JJ Waller's Lockdown: Informal Portraits of this Time, published in September 2020. Parr wrote, "When we look back at the spring and summer of 2020, I think this suit of images will be an iconic memory of this strange time we have all lived through."

In 2021, Waller began a second project, in which he asked volunteers to stage scenes, revealing their lockdown activities.

=== JJ Waller's Sussex by the Sea ===
Waller spent the summer of 2020 photographing the Sussex coast, published that year as a book presented as postcards, inspired by the work of John Hinde.

=== Beside the Sea ===
In April 2025, Waller and Martin Parr collaborated on Beside the Sea, a project for Brighton Festival with the world's first exhibition of photographs on bus shelter rooftops. Over 65 large-scale images of seaside life were displayed across Brighton, in a gallery that could only be viewed from the top deck of a bus. According to the Brighton buses website, "Parr and Waller, united by their passion for capturing the quirks of British coastal culture, have curated selections from each other’s portfolios to create a playful and thought-provoking journey through the iconic British seaside."

Waller explained that the idea was inspired by childhood bus journeys with his mother. "I spent hours quietly looking at the world as a kid through the window. It was like looking through the viewfinder of a camera....I hope that people will see it and think they would like to do it in their own towns....Putting the photographs on bus shelters also means people who may not visit a gallery will have access to them.”

There was an accompanying Beside the Sea exhibition at the Hove Museum of Creativity, running from May until September. Waller also made a short film about the project, which can be seen on YouTube.

== Publications ==
- JJ Waller's Brighton. Vol 1. Curious, 2012.
- JJ Waller's Brighton. Vol 2. Curious, 2014.
- JJ Waller's St. Leonards-on-Sea & Hastings Vol 1. Curious, 2014.
- JJ Waller's Brighton. Vol 3. Curious, 2017.
- JJ Waller's Blackpool Vol 1. Curious, 2017.
- JJ Waller's Brighton & Hove Albion. Curious, 2017.
- JJ Waller's Brighton Pride. Curious, 2019.
- JJ Waller's Lockdown-Informal Portraits Of This Time. Curious, 2020. Edited by Martin Parr.
- JJ Waller's Sussex By The Sea. Curious, 2020.
- JJ Waller's St. Leonards-on-Sea & Hastings Vol 2. Curious, 2022

== Collections ==
- British Stand-Up Comedy Archive, University of Kent
