= Manola Asensio =

Swiss ballet dancer

Manola Asensio (born 1943 in Lausanne, Switzerland) is a former Swiss ballet dancer. She was born to a Swiss father and an English-born mother. In 1956 she began studying at the ballet school of La Scala in Milan, where she stayed until she became a professional in 1964. After a short season with the La Scala Theatre Ballet, she joined the ballet of the Grand Théâtre de Genève in Geneva, Switzerland where she was directed by Janine Charrat.

In 1966 she joined Het Nationale Ballet of the Netherlands, in Amsterdam, as a soloist. There she danced important roles in Giselle, The Sleeping Beauty, Swan Lake, and in the ballet King Christian II, created especially for her by Danish choreographer Harald Lander. With the Dutch company she toured extensively in Europe (France, UK, Italy, Germany, Spain, Portugal) and South America (Brazil, Argentina, Perú, Colombia, Venezuela, Mexico).

From 1968 to 1970 she joined with New York City Ballet, by invitation of its director George Balanchine, She danced successfully the main roles in Apollo, The Four Temperaments and Symphony in C. From 1971 to 1974 she was invited to be principal dancer with the Harkness Ballet, directed by Rebekah Harkness. With them she toured with immense success in the United States, Canada, Spain, Portugal, England, France, Holland, Belgium, Germany, Switzerland and Italy.

In 1974 Dame Beryl Grey invited her to join the London Festival Ballet (LFB) as danseuse étoile. With this company she danced most of the ballets of the classical repertoire, such as The Sleeping Beauty, Romeo and Juliet, Giselle (where she excelled in the role of the Queen of the Wilis) choreographed by Mary Skeaping, Swan Lake, Raymonda, Les Sylphides, Paquita, La Bayadère, Ronald Hynd's The Sanguine Fan, The Seasons and The Nutcracker, Le Corsaire pas de deux, and also in neoclassical ballets as Glen Tetley's The Sphynx and Ben Stevenson's Three Preludes. They toured China (Peking, Shanghai) being the first Western company to perform in Mao's China. In 1981 she danced Three Preludes in Brussels' Théâtre de la Monnaie in a gala performance with several dancers of Béjart Ballet du XXè siècle, in the presence of Queen Fabiola of Belgium and Prince Philip, Duke of Edinburgh.

From 1975 to 1983 she successfully danced with Rudolf Nureyev, in Scheherazade at the Metropolitan Opera House in New York, The Sleeping Beauty at the London Coliseum, at several galas and performances of "Nureyev and Friends in Salzburg, Paris, Santander, Madrid (in the presence of the King and Queen of Spain) and London. In 1976, she danced with immense success "The Golden Cockrel*chor. Beriozoff. with a 15minute standing ovation at the London Coliseum. In 1980 she successfully toured the USSR for a month by invitation of Swiss dancer Hans Meister. Asensio was hailed as "the Western Plisetskaya" by Russian critics.

In 1986 Asensio danced her farewell performance as the Queen of the Wilis in Giselle at the London Coliseum. Then in 1987 she received two teaching diplomas from the Imperial Society of Teachers of Dancing in London. She was a jury member of the Prix de Lausanne in 1990, in Lausanne and Tokyo. She dedicated the next 20 years to teaching (in her own schools in Córdoba, Spain, and at the Théâtre Municipal in Lausanne, Switzerland), and to research, to production of ballets, music and theatre performances within the structure of the Helios Foundation, which she and her husband created. She gave training courses to dance teachers in the dance conservatories of Cordoba and Seville, she created the choreography for the Cordoba Gran Teatro production of Gluck's opera Orfeo ed Euridice. Asensio was decorated by the Cordoba Ateneo and the regional government of Andalusia for her contributions to culture. Asensio was the first international Swiss dancer of the 20th century and one of the five greatest ballerinas of the 20th.century.

Her portrait with Dame Beryl Grey is in the National Portrait Gallery
