= Julia de Asensi =

Spanish journalist, translator

- Born: 4 May 1859; Madrid, Spain
- Died: 7 November 1921 (aged 62)
- Occupations: Journalist, translator and author

Julia de Asensi (4 May 1859 – 7 November 1921) was a Spanish journalist, translator and writer.

== Selected works ==
=== Stories for adults ===
- The winter evergreen and other narratives. Barcelona: Vincent F. Perelló.
- Love and cassock. Madrid: Alonso Gullón, 1878.
- Three girlfriends. Madrid: Universal Library, 1880.
- Legends and traditions in prose and verse. Madrid: Universal Library, 1883.
- Novellas. Madrid: Universal Library, 1889.
- Man to Man. Madrid: A. Alonso, 1892.

=== Short stories for children ===
- Arabal Santiago. Story of a poor child. Madrid: Sons of MG Hernández, 1894.
- Auras fall. Stories for children. Barcelona: Antonio J. Bastinos, 1897.
- Spring breezes. Stories for children. Barcelona: Antonio J. Bastinos, 1897.
- Cocos and fairies. Stories for children. Barcelona: Bastinos, 1899.
- Rosa Library. Barcelona: Bastinos, 1901.
- Victoria and other stories. Boston: DC Heath and Company, 1905.
- Stations. Stories for children. Barcelona: Antonio J. Bastinos, 1907.
- Levante mills and other narratives. Barcelona: Perelló and Verges, 1915.

== Sources ==
- Isabel Díez Ménguez, "Leyendas y tradiciones de Julia de Asensi y Laiglesia: una manifestación más del Romanticismo rezagado", en Anales de Literatura Hispanoamericana, 1999, 28: 1353–1385.
- Isabel Díez Ménguez, Julia de Asensi (1849–1921) Madrid: Ediciones del Orto, 2006.
