= Franco Asencio =

Argentine footballer

Franco Ascencio
Personal information
- Full name: Franco Manuel Ascencio
- Date of birth: August 29, 1981 (age 45)
- Place of birth: Comodoro Rivadavia, Argentina
- Height: 1.71 m (5 ft 7 in)
- Position: Midfielder

Senior career*
Years	Team	Apps	(Gls)
2001–2008	CAI	179	(18)
2009	→ Santiago Wanderers (loan)	28	(6)
2010	→ San Luis Quillota (loan)	13	(1)
2011	CAI	25	(7)
2011–2012	Los Andes	18	(0)
2012–2014	Gimnasia y Tiro	50	(4)
2016	Jorge Newbery	7	(0)
2017	Huracán	4	(0)
2021	Alianza de Cutral Có	3	(0)
Total		326	(31)
Medal record
First place	Torneo Argentino A	2002
Second place	Primera B de Chile	2009
- * Club domestic league appearances and goals

Franco Manuel Ascencio (born August 29, 1981) is an Argentine footballer who plays as an attacking midfielder, most recently for Alianza de Cutral Có of the Torneo Argentino B.

== Personal life ==
Asencio is the older brother of the footballer Jeremías Asencio, who played for Chilean side Deportes Puerto Montt in 2020–21. They are of Chilean descent, since their grandparents are Chilean.

== Titles ==
- CAI 2001–02 (Torneo Argentino A)
