= Pedro Calvo Asensio =

Spanish dramatist (1821–1863)

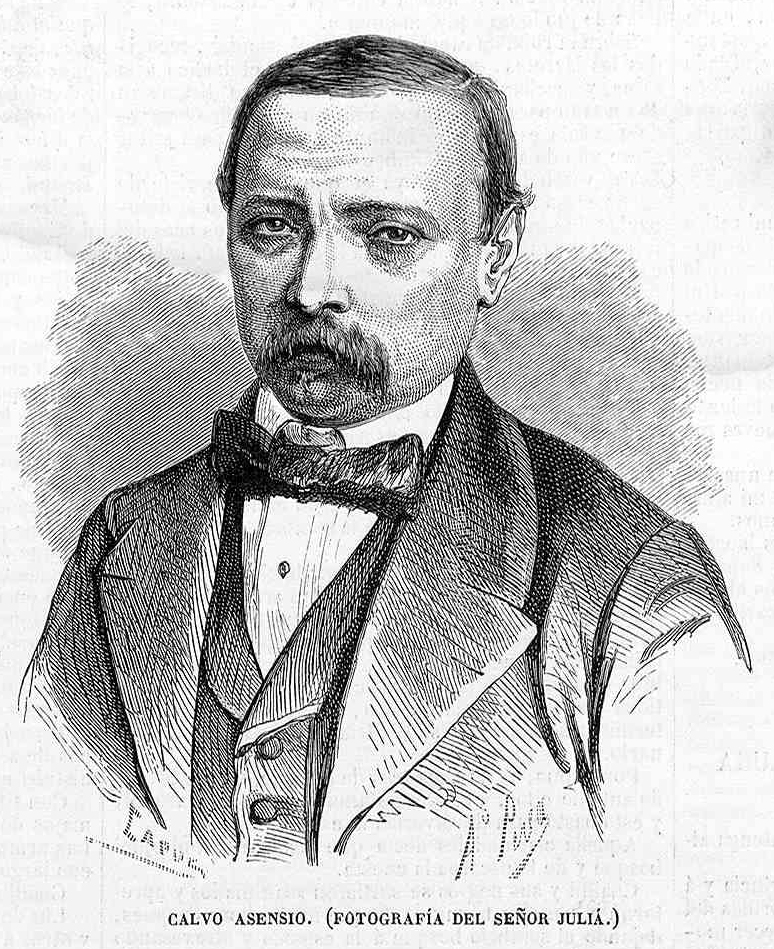
Pedro Calvo Asensio

Pedro Calvo Asensio (1821–1863) was a Spanish playwright, journalist, left-wing politician and Spanish deputy of the 19th century. He was one of the most important Spanish politicians of his time. He owned and managed the newspaper La Iberia, one of the most important newspapers of the mid century in Spain.

== Personal life and education ==
Pedro Nolasco Calvo Asensio was born in Mota del Marqués on 31 January 1821, son of a farmer and solicitor in the court of Leonardo Calvo Conejo and his first wife, María Francisca Asensio de Cea. He had several brothers, notably Manuel Calvo, who would become the librarian of Congress of the Deputies and senior Secretary of Congress, in addition to working with his brother Pedro in the editorial office of La Iberia. He studied Philosophy and Humanities at the University of Valladolid, and then settled in Madrid where he studied Pharmacy and Law, earning his doctorate in pharmacy.

In June 1847, he married Ana María Posadas, with whom he had two children, Gonzalo (1848) and Teresa (1850). He was considered an exemplary husband and father, and so his children took the two surnames of their father (Calvo Asensio) in homage, when he died.

== Journalism ==
He founded and ran the satirical newspaper El Cínife (1845). Founded in 1854, with Ruiz del Cerro and Juan de la Rosa González. Until his sudden death in 1863, he also ran The Iberia, a progressive publication from which he provided support and coverage of the proposals of the Sociedad Económica Matritense which advocated for a customs union between Spain and Portugal. The newspaper was published daily except on Sundays. It became a platform for the progressive party and one of the most important and influential in Spain, surviving most bitter enemies: the prime ministers Ramón María Narváez and Leopoldo O'Donnell. The title of the paper referred to the aspiration to achieve a "unified Iberia", or a union of Spain and Portugal.

The paper supported the Spanish Revolution of 1854 and Baldomero Espartero to head the government while attacking O'Donnell.

In 1863 La Iberia was acquired by Práxedes Mateo Sagasta, together with José Abascal y Carredano, who ran it until 1866 when it reached its peak circulation and served as a critic of the government in the run up to the Glorious Revolution.

== Politics ==
Calvo Asensio started his frenetic political activity with the Progressive Party in 1851 defending the scientific professional class through the Restaurador Farmacéutico, until the revolutionary surge of 1854, in which Calvo enlisted as a volunteer for the defense of the Lavapiés district, along with the streets Ave María, Valencia and Primavera. With the new progressive government, he was decorated with the cross of Carlos III and that of Isabella the Catholic, but he refused those, as well as the title of Secretary of the Health Council, in favor of obtaining a seat as Deputy in 1854. Calvo Asensio is considered a pure progressive, in reference to the difference between this faction of the Progressive Party, headed by Asension, along with Práxedes Mateo Sagasta and Ángel Fernández de los Ríos, and that formed by those known as the resealed progressives, who went on to swell the ranks of the Liberal Union in the Cortes Constituent Assembly in 1854. He defined his political ideology in his "Electoral Program of Valladolid," published in La Iberia on the 12th of September, 1854, which entailed a balance between the respect of traditional Catholic values of his country and the proposals of remarkable modernity, such as free public education in primary school and the establishment of juries for the trial of political crimes. Years later, in an untitled article whose validity was confirmed recently, published in La Iberia on the 6th of September, 1857, Calvo Asensio would dispense with "the renegades of all parties, both political fronts, the pharisees of every great idea" whose existence he blamed on the society that "admitted them...within it, rewards them, considers them, exalts them and respects them."

As deputy in the Cortes Constituent Assembly in 1854, he shows great skills as an orator, two years after he organized in the Senate the coronation of Manuel José Quintana. He was the enemy of O'Donnell, who he attacked in the press and in parliament, so his newspaper was constantly persecuted by him, as well as by general Narváez. With the coup d'état of General O'Donell's 56, the progressive period of Espartero ended and Asensio was forced to start a brief exile to France with Sagasta. When he returned he was elected deputy of Madrid (in the district of Maravillas) in 1856 and began to take the position of leader of the Progressive Party, in opposition. He was deputy until his death, in 1863.

== Pedro Calvo Asensio and Práxedes Mateo Sagasta ==
In the early days of his political career, his friendship with Sagasta which began in the turbulent month of May 1848, during the Revolutions of 1848 was of vital importance. The two were from then on good friends and partners in the Progressive Party and the two were elected in the same election as deputies to the constitutional convention of 1854. Sagasta to the province of Zamora and Asensio to Valladolid. Much later, in 1857, Sagasta was incorporated into the newspaper La Iberia, led by Calvo Asensio, its director, and later, after the death of Calvo Asensio, went to buy his shares of La Iberia from his widow and directed the paper.

== Career as a satirist and poet ==
Calvo Asensio was prolific in a variety of genres. As a satirical and topical poet, he published works such as El eco de la libertad combatido por las bayonetas afrancesadas (1844) and poems such as Las cabriolas y las letras (1850). As playwright he worked in the genre of Romantic Drama, which corresponded to works of historical topics such as La acción de Villalar which was met, according to a contemporary edition of the Repullés Press, "with an extraordinary reception in Madrid, in the theater of Variedades, in May of 1844," or Fernán González y Segunda parte de Fernán González (1847), which was published three years later jointly with Juan de la Rosa. In his position as cultivator of satirical literature, he was founder of El Cínife, a short lived periodical publication which was subtitled: "Paper of Theater and Literature, gossipy, pungent, superficial, bellicose and almost insolent, but very cheap." He wrote other drams such as La cuna no da la nobleza (1845). His best play is the drama Felipe el Prudente (1853), in which, departing from trend of his contemporaries, reclaimed the memory of the disgraced monarch. Some of his comedies were Los disfraces (1844), Valentina valentona (1846), Infantes improvisados (1847), La escala de la fortuna (1848), Ginesillo el aturdido (1849) and two pieces composed with Juan de la Rosa, Los consejos de Tomás (1845) and La Estudiantina o El Diablo en Salamanca (1847).
