= Nano-ARPES =

Nano angle-resolved photoemission spectroscopy (Nano-ARPES) is a variant of the experimental technique angle-resolved photoemission spectroscopy (ARPES). It has the ability to precisely determine the electronic band structure of materials in momentum space with submicron lateral resolution. Due to its demanding experimental setup, this technique is much less extended than ARPES, widely used in condensed matter physics to experimentally determine the electronic properties of a broad range of crystalline materials. Nano-ARPES can access the electronic structure of well-ordered monocrystalline solids with high energy, momentum, and lateral resolution, even if they are nanometric or heterogeneous mesoscopic samples. Nano-ARPES technique is also based on Einstein's photoelectric effect, being photon-in electron-out spectroscopy, which has converted into an essential tool in studying the electronic structure of nanomaterials, like quantum and low dimensional materials.

NanoARPES allows to determine experimentally the relationship between the binding energies and wave momenta of the electrons of the occupied electronic states of the bands with energies close and approximately 10-15 eV below the Fermi level. These electrons are ejected from a solid when it is illuminated by monochromatic photons with sufficient energy to emit photoelectrons from the surface of the material. These photoelectrons are detected by an electron analyzer placed close to the samples surface in vacuum to preserve the uncontaminated surfaces and to avoid the collisions with particles able to modify the energy and trajectory of the photoelectrons in their way to the spectrometer. As in the photoemission process, the momentum is conserved; therefore, the angular distribution of photoelectrons from a monocrystal, even if it is a nanometric size, is also enabled to directly reveal the momentum distribution of initial electronic states in that crystal.

The Nano-ARPES results, as in the ARPES technique, are traditionally shown as energy-momentum dispersion relation along the high symmetry directions of the irreducible Brillouin Zone, displaying the band dispersions of the investigated materials. When the emitted photoelectrons are shown by constant energy surfaces throughout large portions of the reciprocal space, Nano-ARPES can also precisely determine the Fermi surface of the investigated materials. Due to the unique ability to spatially map the electronic dispersion of the electrons in the samples, Nano-ARPES can also generate electronic imaging of nanomaterials with high binding energy and momentum resolution. As Nano-ARPES is a scanning technique, it can use state-of-the-art ARPES spectrometers without requiring them to be able also to discriminate spatially the origin of the analysed photoelectrons. Consequently, Nano-ARPES instrumentation can profit from the most advanced spectrometers developed for ARPES setups, particularly those of the latest generation electron spectrometers with bidimensional detection and high energy and momentum resolution.

== Background ==
The comprehension of the electronic band structure of solids is applied in many fields of condensed matter physics, contributing to the microscopic understanding of many phenomenological trends and guiding the interpretation of experimental spectra in photoemission, optics, inelastic neutron scattering, specific heat, among others, including the effect of spin-polarisation. Most modern band electronic structure theoretical methods employ density functional theory to solve the full many-body Schrödinger equation for electrons in a solid. The consolidated experimental and theoretical approach to describe the electronic structure of solids allows the straightforward visualization of the difference between conductors, insulators, and semiconductors according to the presence of permitted and forbidden electronic states of particular energy and momentum, which can be calculated by quantum mechanics and measured using ARPES.

The ARPES technique has the unique ability to determine the band structure directly. It thus helps understand the degree and type of electron interaction in the solids, corroborating or contesting band electronic structure results calculated using different theoretical approaches. However, this technique's lateral resolution, manipulation, and orientation of submicrometric of heterogeneous samples are rather limited. That is because the electrons measured in ARPES are all those electrons ejected by the photo-absorption process prompted by the incident photons. If the illuminated area of the sample is large enough to cover nonhomogeneous areas, the detected ejected electrons are the sum up of all the photoelectrons emitted by all different illuminated patches. If each area has a distinctive electronic band structure, the ARPES spectra will show the average of all of them weighted according to the size of each different patch present in the illuminated area.

In fact, many complex materials are constituted by disoriented small monocrystals or composed of several nanometric monocrystals. Traditional ARPES can only provide their average electronic structure if the patch size is smaller than the spot size of the ARPES setup, typically 200 um. This limitation is also present in samples with micrometric and submicrometric zones with distinctive chemical composition due to undesired side chemical reactions, for example, originating by the contamination or oxidation of the primitive sample. Hence, being the spot size of the monochromatic photon beam typically over 200 μm side for conventional ARPES, only homogeneous samples with this size or bigger can be studied.

Consequently, a sub-micrometric lateral resolution should be added to ARPES to perform the experimental determination of the electronic structure of small crystalline materials and large samples with heterogeneities. Nano-ARPES has implemented this lateral discrimination by focalising the size of the photon incident beam within the nanometric scale. Similarly to ARPES, the electronic band structure of nanomaterials can be directly measured using Nano-ARPES by measuring the ejected electrons' kinetic energy, velocity, and absolute momentum.

The photon beam focusing to a spot size down to nanometric scale has been routinely achieved in a few well-known X-ray-based methods, such as scanning transmission X-ray microscopy (STXM) and scanning photoemission microscopy (SPEM). However, these techniques are much less demanding because they typically use incident photon energies higher than 150 eV and require non-angle resolved measurements, only recording integrated signals proportional to the X-Ray absorption coefficient and core-level photoelectrons, respectively. In both cases, the Fresnel Zone Plates (FZPs) performance is the essential component determining the lateral resolution, varying from micro- to nanometric lateral resolution. Nowadays, several companies in the market provide FZPs with a resolution better than 30 nm, which has facilitated the construction and operation of several x-Ray based microscopes such as STXM and SPEM instruments in different synchrotron radiation facilities like Elettra, ALS, CLS, and MAX-lab, among others. Nano-ARPES technique, however, requires much lower incident photon energy, typically from 6 eV to 100 eV) to detect those photoelectrons emitted by the electronic states below and close to the Fermi level, which cross-section increases as the incident photon energy decreases. An alternative k-space imaging approach is based on energy-filtered photoemission microscopes (PEEMs). The lateral resolution is achieved using an electron optical column instead of focalizing the incident photon beam. This full-field k-space version of PEEM is available commercially. However, for this commercially available full-field PEEM version with k-space imaging, achieving high energy and momentum resolution is challenging.

== Instrumentation ==
Typically, high energy and momentum resolution ARPES experiments are performed at synchrotrons, which can provide bright and tunable high-energy photons sources to record the electronic band structure of ordered materials directly. That yields sharp and precise E vs k dispersions and constant energy surfaces, including those corresponding to the Fermi surface of the studied materials.

The conventional ARPES systems consist of a monochromatic light source to deliver a narrow beam of photons, a sample holder connected to a manipulator used to position the samples angular and translationally concerning the electron spectrometer (detector), and the incident light beam focus. The equipment is contained within an ultra-high vacuum (UHV) environment, which protects the sample from undesired contamination and prevents scattering of the emitted electrons. After being dispersed along two perpendicular directions for kinetic energy and emission angle, the electrons are directed to the detector and counted to provide ARPES spectra-slices of the band structure along one momentum direction.

The main difference of its typical instrumental setup from other conventional ARPES apparatus is that the soft x-ray beam is focused to a submicrometric spot using Fresnel Zone plates (FZP) lenses. The specimens can be mounted on a high-precision manipulator that ensures the nanoscale sample positioning in the x, y, and z directions, where the polar angle (Θ) and the azimuthal angle (Ψ) can also be automatically scanned.

This basic instrumentation allows two operating modes: Nano-ARPES punctual mode (operating mode type 1) with nano-spot that maps the band structure of nanometric crystalline solids to study quasiparticle dynamics in highly correlated and non-correlated materials as in conventional ARPES, and Nano-ARPES imaging mode (operating mode type 2) that measures the spatial distribution in real space of photoelectrons of a selected binding energy and momentum values range.

State-of-the-art Nano-ARPES microscopes are equipped with continuous interferometric control of the position of the samples for the FZPs, which avoids thermal and mechanical drifts. That is required to prevent undesirable distortions of the recorded Nano-ARPES images (operating mode type 2) and precision and reproducibility of E vs. k dispersion curves along specific directions of the reciprocal space.

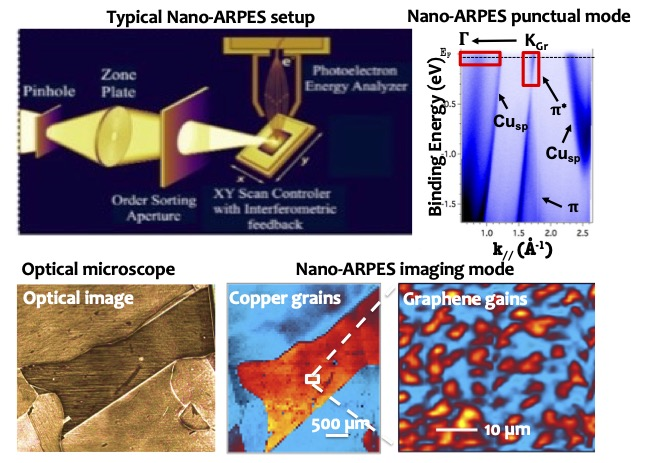
Figure 1: Schematic representation of the essential components of a Nano-ARPES setup. The X-Ray beam as an ultraviolet light source homogenously illuminates the FZP lenses, which refocuses the beam onto the sample. An order selection aperture (OSA) is also placed between the FZP and the sample to suppress unwanted diffraction orders as the CVD graphene and higher diffraction orders, letting go through only the first order. Typical Nano-ARPES results on punctual and imaging mode detection of chemical vapor deposition (CVD) graphene on copper foil substrate, courtesy of the M.C. Asensio group.

== Energy constant surfaces in the reciprocal space & Fermi surface mapping ==
In the Nano-ARPES setups, the used analyzers are the hemispherical electron energy typically installed in high energy and angular resolution conventional ARPES apparatus. They use a slit to prevent the mixing of momentum and energy channels and, consequently, can only take angular maps in one direction. To record maps over energy and two-dimensional momentum space as in conventional ARPES, either the sample needs to be rotated, or the collected photoelectrons beam should be discriminated inside the spectrometer with the electrostatic lens, keeping the sample fixed. The energy-angle-angle maps are converted to binding energy-k//x-k//y maps. These images display constant energy surfaces as a function of the reciprocal space's k//x and k//y waves vectors. The most remarkable constant energy surface is the Fermi surface map, obtained by detecting those photoelectrons with binding energy right at the Fermi level.

== Applications ==
The Nano-ARPES technique is an essential tool to resolve the electronic band structure of mesoscopic or heterogeneous materials in diverse condensed Matter fields like quantum materials high-temperature superconductors, topological materials semiconductors metals, insulators with not-too-large band gap and in a wide variety of low dimensional materials and heterostructures with effects of confinements, different stackings and hybridization. Also, electronic structure changes associated with all types of phase transitions, charge density waves, bands hybridization phase separation, charge transfer, and in-operando devices can be revealed by combining nano-lateral resolution with high energy and momentum resolution.
