= Pablo Asensio =

Argentine footballer and manager

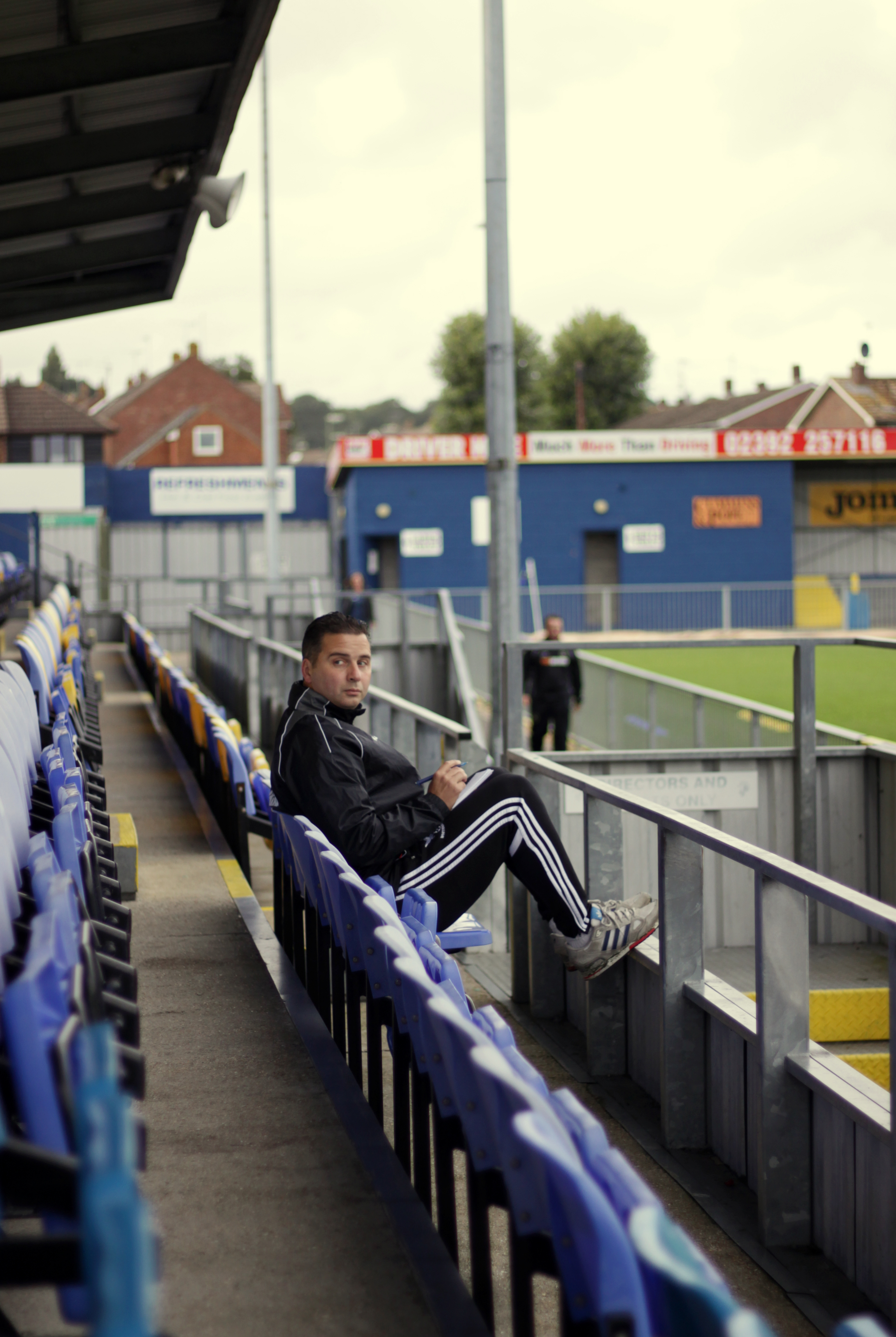
- Pablo Asensio in the stand after a Whitehawk match v Havant & Waterlooville 2016

Personal information
- Full name: Pablo Asensio
- Date of birth: 3 January 1973 (age 53)
- Place of birth: Buenos Aires, Argentina
- Position: Midfielder

Senior career*
| Years | Team | Apps | (Gls) |
- Gimnasia
- Racing Club de Avellaneda

Managerial career
- 2009: Atlètic de Ciutadella
- 2016: Whitehawk
- 2019: RBV United U-18
- * Club domestic league appearances and goals

Pablo Asensio (born 3 January 1973) is an Argentinian former professional footballer, most recently first team manager at National League South side Whitehawk.

== Playing career ==
Asensio was an attacking midfield player who played in Argentina, Brazil, Greece and Spain. He began his career with Gimnasia before moving to Racing Club de Avellaneda in his home country. He retired from playing in 2002 due to ankle injuries.

== Coaching and management ==
Asensio moved to England in September 2002 to study for coaching qualifications. He was an observer under his mentor and friend Gus Poyet at Sunderland, Leeds United and Spurs as well as working as a scout for Poyet when the latter was managing Brighton & Hove Albion. Between 2007 and 2009 Asensio joined the management team at Droylsden and coached at Accrington Stanley.

In July 2009 he was appointed manager at the Menorcan team Atlètic de Ciutadella who play in the Spanish Segunda División B but left in September 2009, as he did not hold the correct UEFA Pro license. Asensio subsequently received his UEFA Pro Licence 'A' in 2011 and then coached at Southport under manager Liam Watson, where he was credited with being a major influence behind the team's push for the play-offs in 2012. From August 2012 he assisted with coaching at Macclesfield Town under manager Steve King before being officially appointed first team coach on 17 October 2012. He was sacked along with King on 3 April 2013.

On 10 February 2014, Asensio was appointed Assistant Manager at Whitehawk under his former manager at Macclesfield Town, Steve King. When King left his post in February 2016, Asensio took over from him as Caretaker Manager, reorganising the squad and playing style to such an extent that after drifting down towards the relegation zone, Whitehawk finished the season in style and reached the playoffs. Asensio was named National League South manager of the month for April and was rewarded by being appointed in May 2016 as permanent manager on a two-year contract. He then undertook a complete overhaul of the playing staff for the start of the new season. After a poor start to the 2016–2017 season, with only one win in eight games, The Hawks replaced Asensio with former Eastleigh manager Richard Hill.
