= Matilde Asensi =

Spanish journalist and writer

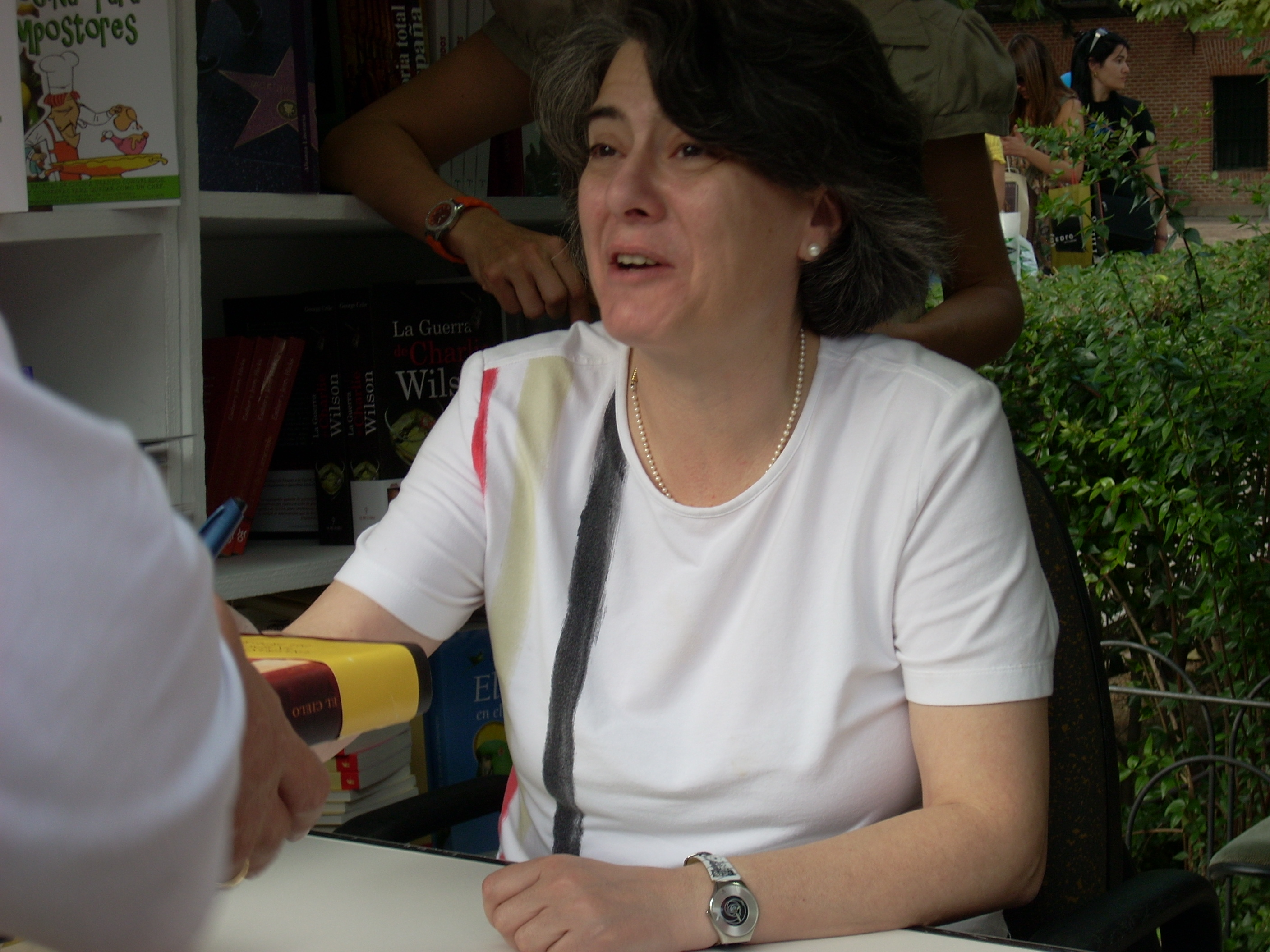
Matilde Asensi in Madrid Book Fair (2008).

Matilde Asensi Carratalá (born 1962) is a Spanish journalist and writer, specialised mainly in historical novels.

== Biography ==
Asensi was born at Alicante.

She studied journalism at the Autonomous University of Barcelona, and she later worked for three years in the service of news of Radio Alicante-SER and Radio Nacional de España (RNE, Spanish National Radio) as the person in charge of local and provincial news. She was also correspondent for Agencia EFE and provincial contributor in the newspapers La Verdad and Información.

== Works ==
"Martín Ojo de Plata" trilogy:

1. 2007: Tierra firme
2. 2010: Venganza en Sevilla
3. 2012: La conjura de Cortés
4. 2013: Martin ojo de plata (compilation)

Cato series:

1. 2001: El último Catón (translated into English, 2006, as "The Last Cato" by Pamela Carmell)
2. 2015: El Regreso del Catón

Other works:

- 1999: El salón de ámbar
- 2000: Iacobus
- 2003: El origen perdido
- 2004: Peregrinatio
- 2006: Todo bajo el cielo
- 2019: Sakura (La Esfera de los Libros, 2019)
