= East Brighton Park =

Public park in Brighton, England

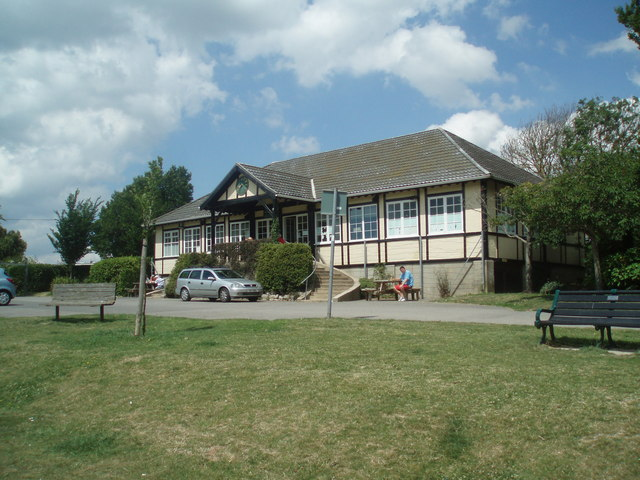
- The café in the park
- Interactive map of East Brighton Park
- Type: Public Park
- Location: Brighton, England
- Coordinates: 50°49′01″N 00°06′03″W
- Area: 60 acres (24 ha)
- Created: 1925
- Operator: Brighton & Hove City Council
- Open: 24 hours
- Status: Open year round

East Brighton Park is located on the eastern edge of the city of Brighton and Hove, England. Bounded by Wilson Avenue and East Brighton golf course, the park extends into Sheepcote Valley and covers around 60 acres. Within the park, there are pitches for football and cricket, tennis courts, a café and a playground, beyond it is the South Downs National Park. It was created in 1925.

== Location ==
The park lies between Wilson Avenue and East Brighton golf course, on the eastern side of Brighton, just north of Brighton Marina. Adjacent to it and served by the same access road are Whitehawk F.C., Brighton Caravan Club and a sports ground used by Brighton College. Further up the hill are the South Downs National Park, Stanley Deason leisure centre and the municipal dump.

== History ==
Brighton Corporation bought the land which would later become the park in September 1913. It purchased over 1000 acres of what was then land in the parish of Ovingdean. The 60 acres of parkland were landscaped in 1925 to provide football pitches and tennis courts. Brighton College had leased 25 acres in 1923, but after experiencing financial problems had to return some land to the Corporation, which then created the Enclosed Football Ground in 1947 (now the site of Whitehawk F.C.). The playground was set up in 1987.

The caravan park to the north of the park was opened in 1938 and was the first municipal camping ground in England, formed by redeveloping the former Newhouse Farm.

In 1968, scenes in the film Oh! What a Lovely War were shot in the park, which was used to replicate the trenches of the Battle of the Somme.

== Uses ==
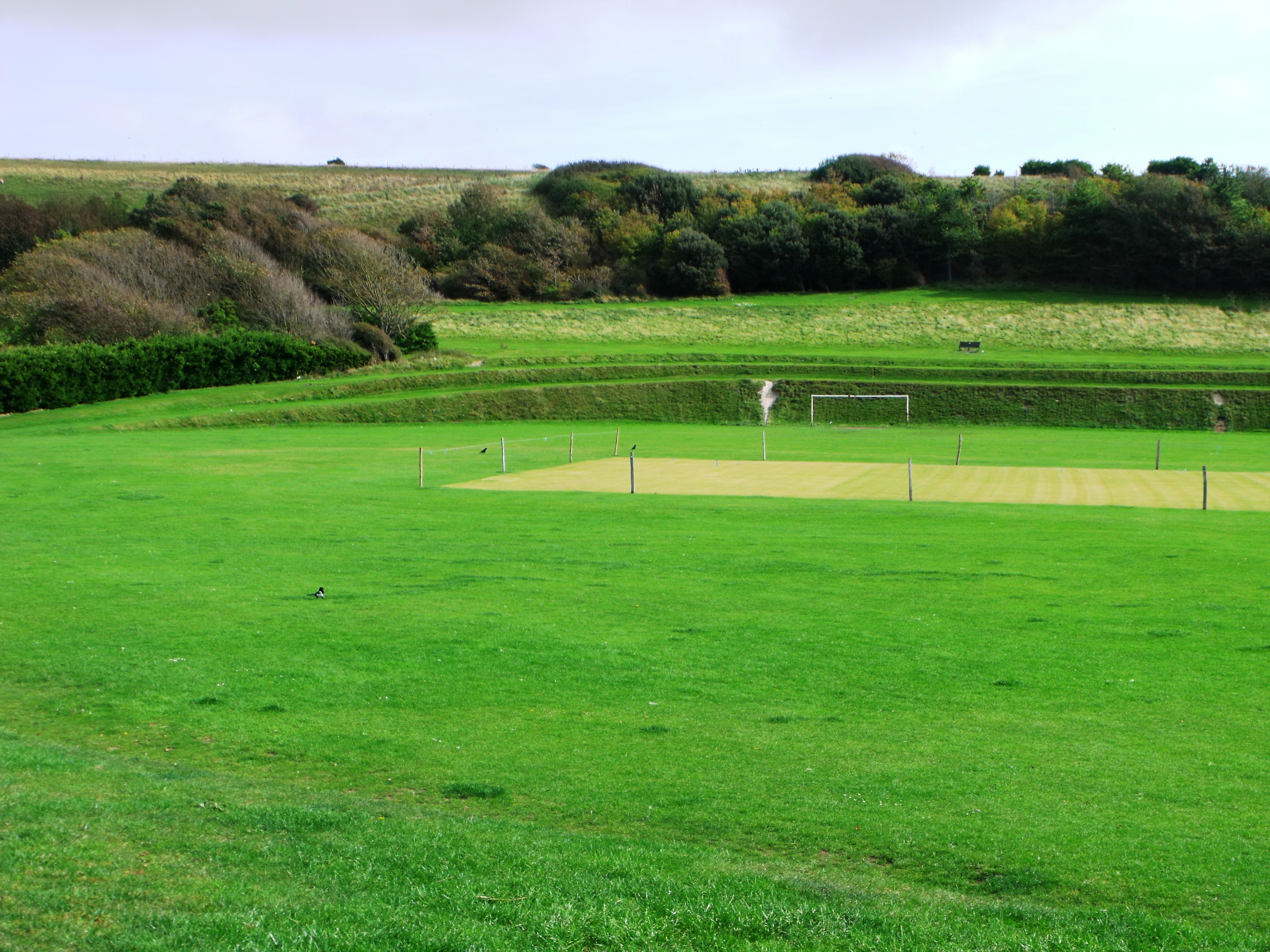
The cricket pitch

The council provides a cricket ground, football pitches, tennis courts and a playground. Sheep are grazed on the sides of the valley. The park is also used by the South East Coast Ambulance Service to land helicopters when bringing emergency cases to the Royal Sussex Hospital. In 2016, Prince Andrew flew in by helicopter on his way to visit a local school.

A café operates from within the cricket pavilion. Starting in 2018, Wild Chalk is a one day family friendly event organised by South Downs National Park and the council in order to raise awareness of the unique and rare chalk grassland habitat of places like Sheepcote Valley. The Land Beyond dance festival was due to take place in the park in June 2019, but the first day was cancelled as a result of high winds. The second day of the 5,000 person event went ahead as planned. In winter 2019, there were homeless encampments in the park alongside many other places in the city.
