= List of Brighton & Hove Albion F.C. seasons =

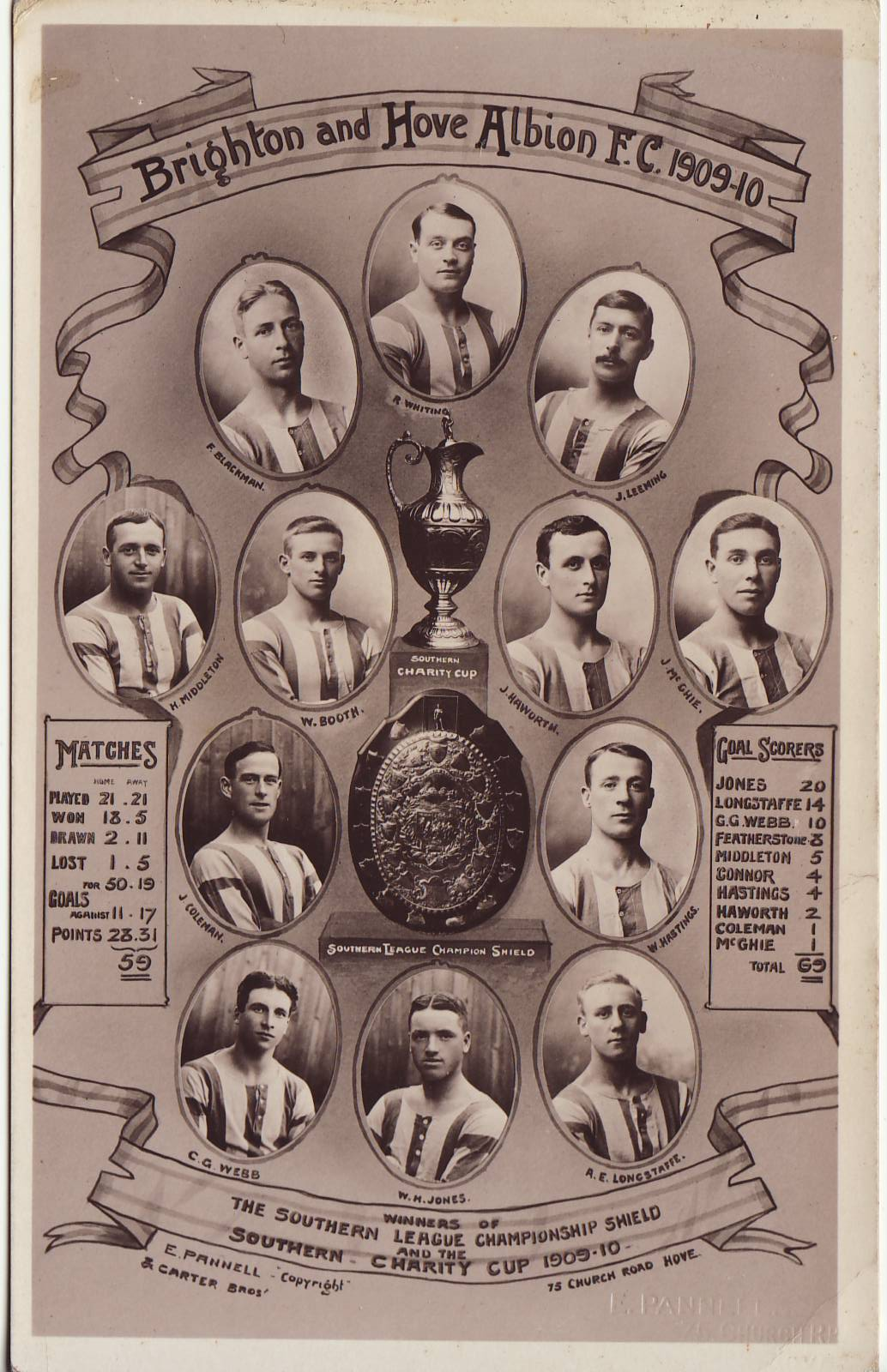
The Brighton & Hove Albion F.C. team of 1909–10, winners of the Southern League title and the Southern Professional Charity Cup

Brighton & Hove Albion Football Club is an English association football club based in the city of Brighton and Hove, East Sussex. The club was founded in 1901 and played in the Southern League from the 1901–02 season until 1920, when that league's first division was absorbed into the Football League. In 1910, they won the Southern League title and defeated Football League champions Aston Villa in the FA Charity Shield. As a Football League team, Albion have won three divisional titles at the third level of the English football league system and two at the fourth. They played in the 1983 FA Cup Final, losing to Manchester United after a replay, and their best achievement in the League Cup was in 1978–79 when they reathed the quarter-finals.

As of the end of the 2025–26 season, the club's first team have spent 7 seasons in the fourth tier of the English football league system, 55 in the third, 24 in the second and 13 in the top tier. The table details their achievements and the top goalscorer in senior competitions from their debut in the Southern League and FA Cup in 1901–02 to the end of the most recently completed season.

== History ==
After Brighton United and then Brighton & Hove Rangers disbanded, a new professional football club was formed at a meeting held in the Seven Stars Hotel in June 1901. The club adopted the name Brighton & Hove Albion and took over Brighton & Hove Rangers' place in the Southern League Second Division. They also entered the FA Cup for the first time, disposing of Brighton Athletic, Eastbourne, and Hastings & St Leonards before succumbing 3–2 at home to Clapton in the third qualifying round. The Goldstone Ground became Albion's permanent home in their second season, when the club entered a team in the South Eastern League to provide additional matches on those Saturdays free of Southern League or cup fixtures. Albion lost out on the 1903 Southern League Second Division title on goal average, but gained promotion to the First Division via the test match system. The committee's recommendation against accepting the promotion on financial grounds was overruled by the membership, but their fears were justified when the club lost £1,500 on their first year's trading as a limited company. To raise income from additional matches, a team was entered in the United League in 1905–06; these matches were played in midweek, because Saturdays and public holidays during the playing season were fully taken up by the Southern League and FA Cup.

In 1909–10, they won their first major title. The Times wrote that "Brighton and Hove Albion have not had much difficulty in finishing at the head of the Southern League, and for that reason the competition has lost some of its interest, though probably the rivalry between the teams has been as keen as ever." This achievement earned them a place in the FA Charity Shield to face reigning Football League champions Aston Villa; Albion won 1–0 with a second-half goal from Charlie Webb.

Under the management of Webb, who was offered the post while awaiting repatriation from a German prisoner-of-war camp, the club joined the Football League in 1920, when a Third Division was formed from the Southern League First Division of the preceding season. Between the wars, Albion finished regularly in the top half of the Third Division South, but saved their best form for the FA Cup, eliminating numerous First Division sides from the competition. In the 1922–23 season, they were drawn to play the amateur club Corinthian in that club's first ever match in the FA Cup competition. Interest was such that the game was filmed for cinematic release, and Brighton's eventual victory, in a second replay at Chelsea's ground, Stamford Bridge, was watched by a Monday-afternoon crowd of 45,000. Ten years later, an administrative oversight meant they failed to apply for exemption to the later rounds of the FA Cup, so had to begin at the first qualifying round, progressing through eight rounds to the last 16 of the competition before losing to West Ham United after a replay.

In 1948 Albion successfully applied for re-election to the League after finishing bottom for the first time. After several near misses, they were promoted as champions to the Second Division in 1958, and five years later, two successive relegations took them into Division Four. Former Tottenham Hotspur and England centre-forward Bobby Smith's 19 goals alongside Wally Gould's 21 made a major contribution to Albion winning the Fourth Division title in 1965, and seven years later the team made a brief return to Division Two. Peter Ward's 32 goals in 1976–77 helped return the team to the Second Division, and two years later, a 3–1 victory away at Newcastle United confirmed their promotion to the First Division. In 1983, for the first time, they reached the FA Cup Final, in which they played Manchester United. The scores were level at 2–2 until the last moments of extra time, when Albion's Gordon Smith had a clear chance to score a winning goal. Peter Jones's radio commentary on the moment became famous: "and Smith must score...", he cried, just before Smith's shot was blocked by the goalkeeper's legs. Albion lost the replay 4–0, and were relegated that same season.

A sixth-place finish in 1990–91 qualified Albion for the playoffs; they beat Millwall in the semi-final, then lost 3–1 to Notts County in the final. The following season, when the newly formed FA Premier League split from the Football League, the remaining divisions of the Football League were renumbered upwards, and Albion were relegated from the "old" to the "new" Second Division. Three years later, another relegation took Albion to the bottom tier of the Football League, and financial problems meant the Goldstone Ground would be sold. From October to the penultimate game of the 1996–97 season, Albion were bottom of the League, their plight made worse by a two-point deduction for failure to control their protesting supporters, and they went into the last game needing at least a draw at Hereford United to stay in the League and relegate their opponents to the Conference. After falling behind to an own goal, Robbie Reinelt equalised in the second half to secure their League status.

The club played two seasons at Gillingham, some 70 miles (110 km) from home, before returning to Brighton to the Withdean Stadium, a municipal athletics track, in 1999. Bobby Zamora's 28 League goals in each of two consecutive seasons helped his team to two successive divisional titles and promotion back to the second tier. Over the next nine seasons Albion suffered two relegations and two promotions, the first via the playoffs in 2004 and the second, as League One champions, coincident with the opening of the club's new stadium at Falmer in 2011. After a season of consolidation, three playoff semi-final defeats and a season spent flirting with relegation, Albion were Championship runners-up in 2016–17 and promoted to the Premier League for the first time.

After a 15th-place finish in 2017–18, Brighton reached the FA Cup semi-finals for only the second time in the club's history in 2018–19 and narrowly avoided relegation to the Championship. Under the management of Graham Potter, their ninth place in the 2021–22 Premier League was the highest top-flight finishing position in the club's history. Following Potter's departure to Chelsea and the appointment of Roberto De Zerbi in the following season, Brighton surpassed this achievement and finished in sixth place in the 2022–23 Premier League, qualifying for European football for the first time in club history. They topped their group to reach the last 16 of the 2023–24 Europa League, in which they lost to AS Roma.

== Key ==
Key to league record:

- Pld – Matches played
- W – Matches won
- D – Matches drawn
- L – Matches lost
- GF – Goals for
- GA – Goals against
- Pts – Points
- Pos – Final position

Key to colours and symbols:

1st or W	Winners
2nd or F	Runners-up
↑	Promoted
↓	Relegated
♦	Top league scorer in Albion's division

Key to divisions:

- Southern 1 – Southern League First Division
- Southern 2 – Southern League Second Division
- South Eastern – South Eastern League (Note: The South-Eastern League, founded in 1901, consisted of a mixture of amateur teams and reserve teams of Southern League clubs in London and the south-east of England. Albion fielded a first team in the competition in the 1902–03 season, and a reserve team thereafter.)
- South Alliance – Southern Football Alliance (Note: The Southern Football Alliance was a midweek league whose rules required at least seven first-team players in the starting eleven. It proved a financial failure, so Brighton & Hove Albion withdrew from the league after two seasons, despite the on-field success enjoyed by their first eleven.)
- United – United League (Note: One of several short-lived leagues of this name, this incarnation of the United League was founded in 1905 as a secondary competition for Southern League clubs. Albion played in the competition in its first two seasons.)
- Western 1A – Western League Division 1A (Note: The Western League was formed in 1892 in the Bristol area, but expanded to include Southern League teams using it as a secondary competition. Albion played in the competition for two seasons before the Southern League teams withdrew because of the travelling involved.)
- Division 1 – Football League First Division
- Division 2 – Football League Second Division
- Division 3 – Football League Third Division
- Division 3S – Football League Third Division South
- Division 4 – Football League Fourth Division
- Championship – Football League Championship/EFL Championship
- League One – Football League One
- Premier League – Premier League

Key to rounds:

- QR3 – Third qualifying round
- QR4 – Fourth qualifying round, etc.
- Inter – Intermediate round (between qualifying rounds and rounds proper)
- R1 – First round
- R2 – Second round, etc.
- Ro16 – Round of 16
- QF – Quarter-finals
- SF – Semi-finals
- F – Final
- W – Winners
- (S) – Southern section of regionalised stage

Details for abandoned competitions – the 1938–39 Third Division South Cup and the 1939–40 Football League – are shown in italics and appropriately footnoted.

== Seasons ==
List of seasons, including league division and statistics, cup results and top scorer(s)
Season	League									FA Cup (Note: Beginning with the 1925–26 season, the FA Cup was structured so that the third round proper contained 64 teams. Prior to that date, the structure had varied, so rounds are not directly comparable to the round of the same name after 1925. For example, in 1901–02, when Albion first entered the competition, there were only three rounds proper before the semifinal, as compared with the current six.)	League Cup (Note: The League Cup competition started in the 1960–61 season.)	Other		Top scorer(s) (Note: Includes goals scored in all first-team competitions, i.e. Premier League, UEFA Europa League, the Football League and playoffs, FA Cup, League Cup, Full Members' Cup, Football League Trophy, Third Division South Cup, Southern League and promotion test match, FA Charity Shield, South-Eastern League (1902–03 season), United League (1905–06 and 1906–07), Western Football League (1907–08 and 1908–09) and championship match, Southern Football Alliance (1912–13 and 1913–14) and Southern Professional Charity Cup.)	
Season	Division (Note: Divisions are sorted according to their level within the English football league system at the time.)	Pld	W	D	L	GF	GA	Pts	Pos (Note: In seasons when the club played in more than one league, the column is sorted on the Southern League position.)	FA Cup	League Cup	Competition	Result	Player(s)	Goals
1901–02	Southern 2	16	11	0	5	34	17	22	3rd	QR3	—	—	—	Frank McAvoy	9
1902–03	Southern 2 ↑; South Eastern	10; 22	7; 11	1; 2	2; 9	34; 45	11; 39	15; 24	2nd (Note: Runners-up on goal average for the Southern League Second Division title, Albion were promoted to the Southern League First Division by winning 5–3 in a test match against Watford, who had finished second bottom in the First Division.); 5th	QR4	—	—	—	Frank Scott	31
1903–04	Southern 1	34	6	12	16	45	69	24	17th	QR3	—	—	—	Billy Roberts	9
1904–05	Southern 1	34	13	6	15	44	45	32	11th	Inter	—	—	—	Andy Gardner	13
1905–06	Southern 1; United	34; 18	9; 6	7; 4	18; 8	30; 28	55; 28	25; 16	16th; 7th	R2	—	—	—	Dickie Joynes; Billy Yates	9
1906–07	Southern 1; United	38; 14	16; 6	9; 6	11; 2	53; 33	43; 26	45; 18	3rd; 2nd	R1	—	—	—	Jack Hall	28
1907–08	Southern 1; Western 1A	38; 12	12; 6	8; 2	18; 4	46; 19	59; 19	32; 14	17th; 3rd	R2	—	Southern Charity Cup (Note: The Southern Professional Charity Cup was open to any professional club in London and the South-East of England and ran from 1901 until 1915. The majority of Southern League clubs participated.)	R2	Jack Hall	26
1908–09	Southern 1; Western 1A	40; 12	14; 7	7; 2	19; 3	60; 23	61; 13	35; 16	18th; 1st (Note: Won Division 1A of the Western League, but lost 2–1 in a playoff against Millwall, winners of Division 1B, for the overall title.)	R1	—	Southern Charity Cup	F	Jack Martin	25
1909–10	Southern 1	42	23	13	6	69	28	59	1st	R1	—	FA Charity Shield; Southern Charity Cup	W (Note: As reigning Southern League champions, Albion played Football League champions Aston Villa in the 1910 FA Charity Shield at Stamford Bridge, London. Albion won 1–0, the goal scored by Charlie Webb.); W (Note: Beat Watford 1–0 in the final at Stamford Bridge, the goal scored by Bullet Jones.)	Bullet Jones	22
1910–11	Southern 1	38	20	8	10	58	35	48	3rd	R2	—	Southern Charity Cup	F	Bullet Jones	19
1911–12	Southern 1	38	19	9	10	73	35	47	5th	R1	—	Southern Charity Cup	R2	Jimmy Smith	27
1912–13	Southern 1; South Alliance	38; 16	13; 8	12; 5	13; 3	48; 28	47; 19	38; 21	9th; 2nd	R2	—	Southern Charity Cup	F	Charlie Webb	13
1913–14	Southern 1; South Alliance	38; 16	15; 11	12; 2	11; 3	43; 39	45; 15	42; 24	7th; 1st	R3	—	Southern Charity Cup	R1	Bill Miller	20
1914–15	Southern 1	38	16	7	15	46	47	39	10th	R2	—	Southern Charity Cup	R1	Bullet Jones	13
1915–19	The Football League and FA Cup were suspended until after the First World War. Albion played no part in the wartime competitions.														
1919–20	Southern 1	42	14	8	20	60	72	36	16th	QR6	—	—	—	Jack Doran	10
1920–21	Division 3 (Note: In 1920, the Football League formed a third division comprising most of the Southern League First Division clubs.)	42	14	8	20	42	61	36	18th	R2	—	—	—	Jack Doran	22
1921–22	Division 3S	42	13	9	20	45	51	35	19th	R2	—	—	—	Jack Doran	23
1922–23	Division 3S	42	20	11	11	52	34	51	4th	R2	—	—	—	Eddie Fuller	13
1923–24	Division 3S	42	21	9	12	68	37	51	5th	R3	—	—	—	Tommy Cook	28
1924–25	Division 3S	42	19	8	15	59	45	46	8th	R2	—	—	—	Tommy Cook	18
1925–26	Division 3S	42	19	9	14	84	73	47	5th	R1	—	—	—	Sam Jennings	20
1926–27	Division 3S	42	21	11	10	79	50	53	4th	R3	—	—	—	Sam Jennings	27
1927–28	Division 3S	42	19	10	13	81	69	48	4th	R2	—	—	—	Tommy Cook	26
1928–29	Division 3S	42	16	6	20	58	76	38	15th	R1	—	—	—	Dan Kirkwood	21
1929–30	Division 3S	42	21	8	13	87	63	50	5th	R5	—	—	—	Hugh Vallance	32
1930–31	Division 3S	42	17	15	10	68	53	49	4th	R4	—	—	—	Geordie Nicol	19
1931–32	Division 3S	42	17	12	13	73	58	46	8th	R3	—	—	—	Arthur Attwood	29
1932–33	Division 3S	42	17	8	17	66	65	42	12th	R5	—	—	—	Arthur Attwood	35
1933–34	Division 3S	42	15	13	14	68	60	43	10th	R4	—	Third Division South Cup	SF	Buster Brown	15
1934–35	Division 3S	42	17	9	16	69	62	43	9th	R3	—	Third Division South Cup	R2	Buster Brown	26
1935–36	Division 3S	42	18	8	16	70	63	44	7th	R3	—	Third Division South Cup	QF	Alec Law	27
1936–37	Division 3S	42	24	5	13	74	43	53	3rd	R1	—	Third Division South Cup	R1	Bert Stephens	26
1937–38	Division 3S	42	21	9	12	64	44	51	5th	R3	—	Third Division South Cup	R1	Jock Davie	24
1938–39	Division 3S	42	19	11	12	68	49	49	3rd	R1	—	Third Division South Cup (Note: Although the 1938–39 Third Division South Cup was never completed, Brighton & Hove Albion do include their match in this season's competition in their player statistics.)	R2	Bert Stephens	17
1939–40 (Note: When the Second World War began, the 1939–40 Football League season was abandoned with three matches played and Brighton in 5th position.)	Division 3S	3	1	2	0	5	4	4	5th	—	—	—	—	Jock Davie	2
1939–45	The Football League and FA Cup were suspended until after the Second World War.														
1945–46	—	—	—	—	—	—	—	—	—	R5 (Note: The Football League did not resume until the 1946–47 season, but the FA Cup was contested in 1945–46. From the first round proper to the sixth round (quarter-final), results were determined on aggregate score over two legs.)	—	—	—	Jock Davie (Note: Goals scored in FA Cup competition only.)	10
1946–47	Division 3S	42	13	12	17	54	72	38	17th	R1	—	—	—	George Chapman	10
1947–48	Division 3S	42	11	12	19	43	73	34	22nd	R3	—	—	—	Tony James	14
1948–49	Division 3S	42	15	18	9	55	55	48	6th	R1	—	—	—	Des Tennant	11
1949–50	Division 3S	42	16	12	14	57	69	44	8th	R1	—	—	—	Johnny McNichol	9
1950–51	Division 3S	46	13	17	16	71	79	43	13th	R4	—	—	—	Johnny McNichol	14
1951–52	Division 3S	46	24	10	12	87	63	58	5th	R1	—	—	—	Ken Bennett; Billy Reed	19
1952–53	Division 3S	46	19	12	15	81	75	50	7th	R3	—	—	—	Ken Bennett	13
1953–54	Division 3S	46	26	9	11	86	61	61	2nd	R2	—	—	—	Bert Addinall	22
1954–55	Division 3S	46	20	10	16	76	63	50	6th	R3	—	—	—	Albert Mundy	21
1955–56	Division 3S	46	29	7	10	112	50	65	2nd	R2	—	—	—	Albert Mundy	28
1956–57	Division 3S	46	19	14	13	86	65	52	6th	R1	—	—	—	Albert Mundy	20
1957–58	Division 3S ↑	46	24	12	10	88	64	60	1st	R2	—	—	—	Peter Harburn; Dave Sexton	20
1958–59	Division 2	42	15	11	16	74	90	41	12th	R3	—	—	—	John Shepherd	17
1959–60	Division 2	42	13	12	17	67	76	38	14th	R5	—	—	—	Bill Curry	26
1960–61	Division 2	42	14	9	19	61	75	37	16th	R4	R3	—	—	Adrian Thorne	14
1961–62	Division 2 ↓	42	10	11	21	42	86	31	22nd	R3	R1	—	—	Johnny Goodchild; Bobby Laverick; Tony Nicholas	10
1962–63	Division 3 ↓	46	12	12	22	58	84	36	22nd	R1	R2	—	—	Peter Donnelly	11
1963–64	Division 4	46	19	12	15	71	52	50	8th	R1	R2	—	—	Johnny Goodchild	15
1964–65	Division 4 ↑	46	26	11	9	102	57	63	1st	R1	R1	—	—	Wally Gould	21
1965–66	Division 3	46	16	11	19	67	65	43	15th	R2	R2	—	—	Charlie Livesey	14
1966–67	Division 3	46	13	15	18	61	71	41	19th	R4	R4	—	—	Kit Napier; Eric Whitington	10
1967–68	Division 3	46	16	16	14	57	55	48	10th	R2	R2	—	—	Kit Napier	28
1968–69	Division 3	46	16	13	17	72	65	45	12th	R2	R2	—	—	Kit Napier	18
1969–70	Division 3	46	23	9	14	57	43	55	5th	R2	R3	—	—	Allan Gilliver	16
1970–71	Division 3	46	14	16	16	50	47	44	14th	R3	R1	—	—	Kit Napier	13
1971–72	Division 3 ↑	46	27	11	8	82	47	65	2nd	R2	R2	—	—	Kit Napier	19
1972–73	Division 2 ↓	42	8	13	21	46	83	29	22nd	R3	R2	—	—	Ken Beamish	10
1973–74	Division 3	46	16	11	19	52	58	43	19th	R1	R1	—	—	Ken Beamish	12
1974–75	Division 3	46	16	10	20	56	64	42	19th	R3	R1	—	—	Fred Binney	13
1975–76	Division 3	46	22	9	15	78	53	53	4th	R3	R1	—	—	Fred Binney	27
1976–77	Division 3 ↑	46	25	11	10	83	40	61	2nd	R1	R4	—	—	Peter Ward (Note: Ward scored 32 goals in the Third Division.)	36 ♦
1977–78	Division 2	42	22	12	8	63	38	56	4th	R4	R2	—	—	Peter Ward	17
1978–79	Division 2 ↑	42	23	10	9	72	39	56	2nd (Note: Promoted to the top division of English football for the first time.)	R3	QF	—	—	Peter Ward	13
1979–80	Division 1	42	11	15	16	47	57	37	16th	R4	R4	—	—	Peter Ward	18
1980–81	Division 1	42	14	7	21	54	67	35	19th	R3	R3	—	—	Michael Robinson	22
1981–82	Division 1	42	13	13	16	43	52	52 (Note: The 1981–82 season saw the introduction of three points for a win instead of two.)	13th	R4	R3	—	—	Andy Ritchie	14
1982–83	Division 1 ↓	42	9	13	20	38	68	40	22nd	F (Note: Albion drew 2–2 with Manchester United at Wembley Stadium, losing 4–0 in the replay.)	R2	—	—	Michael Robinson	10
1983–84	Division 2	42	17	9	16	69	60	60	9th	R5	R3	—	—	Terry Connor	17
1984–85	Division 2	42	20	12	10	54	34	72	6th	R4	R2	—	—	Terry Connor	16
1985–86	Division 2	42	16	9	17	64	62	57	10th	R6	R3	Full Members' Cup	R1(S)	Dean Saunders	19
1986–87	Division 2 ↓	42	9	12	21	37	54	39	22nd	R3	R2	Full Members' Cup	R1	Terry Connor	9
1987–88	Division 3 ↑	46	23	15	8	69	47	84	2nd	R4	R1	Associate Members' Cup	SF(S)	Garry Nelson	32
1988–89	Division 2	46	14	9	23	57	66	51	19th	R3	R1	Full Members' Cup	R1	Garry Nelson	16
1989–90	Division 2	46	15	9	22	56	72	54	18th	R4	R1	Full Members' Cup	R2(S)	Kevin Bremner	12
1990–91	Division 2	46	21	7	18	63	69	70	6th (Note: Lost 3–1 to Notts County in the playoff final after beating Millwall 6–2 on aggregate in the semi-finals.)	R4	R1	Full Members' Cup	R3(S)	Mike Small	21
1991–92	Division 2 (Note: When the newly formed FA Premier League split from the Football League, the remaining divisions of the Football League were renumbered upwards, so Brighton were relegated from the "old" Second Division into the "new" Second Division.) ↓	46	12	11	23	56	77	47	23rd	R4	R2	Full Members' Cup	R3(S)	Mark Gall	14
1992–93	Division 2	46	20	9	17	63	59	69	9th	R4	R2	Football League Trophy	QF(S)	Kurt Nogan	22
1993–94	Division 2	46	15	14	17	60	67	59	14th	R1	R2	Football League Trophy	R1(S)	Kurt Nogan	26
1994–95	Division 2	46	14	17	15	54	53	56	16th	R1	R3	Football League Trophy	R1(S)	Junior McDougald	13
1995–96	Division 2 ↓	46	10	10	26	46	69	40	23rd	R2	R1	Football League Trophy	QF(S)	Junior McDougald	9
1996–97	Division 3	46	13	10	23	53	70	47 (Note: Two points deducted as punishment for failure to control spectators.)	23rd	R1	R1	Football League Trophy	R2(S)	Craig Maskell	16
1997–98	Division 3	46	6	17	23	38	66	35	23rd	R1	R1	Football League Trophy	R2(S)	Jeff Minton	7
1998–99	Division 3	46	16	7	23	49	66	55	17th	R1	R1	Football League Trophy	R2(S)	Richie Barker; Gary Hart	12
1999–2000	Division 3	46	17	16	13	64	46	67	11th	R2	R1	Football League Trophy	R2(S)	Darren Freeman	13
2000–01	Division 3 ↑	46	28	8	10	73	35	92	1st	R2	R1	Football League Trophy	R2(S)	Bobby Zamora (Note: Zamora scored 28 goals in Division Three.)	31 ♦
2001–02	Division 2 ↑	46	25	15	6	66	42	90	1st	R3	R2	Football League Trophy	QF(S)	Bobby Zamora (Note: Zamora scored 28 goals in Division Two.)	32 ♦
2002–03	Division 1 ↓	46	11	12	23	49	67	45	23rd	R3	R2	—	—	Bobby Zamora	14
2003–04	Division 2 ↑	46	22	11	13	64	43	77	4th (Note: Promoted via the playoffs: beat Swindon Town in the semi-final after a penalty shootout, then beat Bristol City 1–0 in the playoff final with a late penalty scored by Leon Knight.)	R1	R2	Football League Trophy	QF(S)	Leon Knight (Note: Knight scored 25 goals in Division Two. This figure excludes his goal in the playoff final: statistical sources, e.g. Sky Sports Football Yearbook (formerly Rothmans Football Yearbook), restrict league goals to those scored during the regular season.)	27 ♦
2004–05	Championship	46	13	12	21	40	65	51	20th	R3	R1	—	—	Adam Virgo	8
2005–06	Championship ↓	46	7	17	22	39	71	38	24th	R3	R1	—	—	Colin Kazim-Richards	6
2006–07	League One	46	14	11	21	49	58	53	18th	R3	R2	Football League Trophy	SF(S)	Jake Robinson	12
2007–08	League One	46	19	12	15	58	50	69	7th	R3	R1	Football League Trophy	SF(S)	Nicky Forster	19
2008–09	League One	46	13	13	20	55	70	52	16th	R1	R3	Football League Trophy	AF(S)	Nicky Forster	16
2009–10	League One	46	15	14	17	56	60	59	13th	R4	R1	Football League Trophy	R2(S)	Nicky Forster	16
2010–11	League One ↑	46	28	11	7	85	40	95	1st	R5	R1	Football League Trophy	R1(S)	Glenn Murray	22
2011–12	Championship	46	17	15	14	52	52	66	10th	R5	R3	—	—	Ashley Barnes	14
2012–13	Championship	46	19	18	9	69	43	75	4th (Note: Lost in the play-off semifinal to Crystal Palace on aggregate.)	R4	R1	—	—	Craig Mackail-Smith	11
2013–14	Championship	46	19	15	12	55	40	72	6th (Note: Lost 6–2 on aggregate to Derby County in the play-off semifinal.)	R5	R1	—	—	Leonardo Ulloa	16
2014–15	Championship	46	10	17	19	44	54	47	20th	R4	R4	—	—	Lewis Dunk	7
2015–16	Championship	46	24	17	5	72	42	89	3rd (Note: Missed out on automatic promotion on goal difference by just two goals, then lost in the play-off semifinal to Sheffield Wednesday on aggregate after four players were injured in the first leg.)	R3	R2	—	—	Tomer Hemed	17
2016–17	Championship ↑	46	28	9	9	74	40	93	2nd (Note: Seven points ahead of Newcastle United with three matches remaining, needing just three points to secure the Championship title, Albion lost the first two. In the third, they were a goal ahead against ten-man Aston Villa but conceded in the 89th minute. Newcastle won their last three matches to clinch the title.)	R4	R3	—	—	Glenn Murray	23
2017–18	Premier League	38	9	13	16	34	54	40	15th	QF	R3	—	—	Glenn Murray	14
2018–19	Premier League	38	9	9	20	35	60	36	17th	SF	R2	—	—	Glenn Murray	15
2019–20	Premier League	38	9	14	15	39	54	41	15th	R3	R3	—	—	Neal Maupay	10
2020–21	Premier League	38	9	14	15	40	46	41	16th	R5	R4	—	—	Neal Maupay	8
2021–22	Premier League	38	12	15	11	42	44	51	9th	R4	R4	—	—	Neal Maupay	9
2022–23	Premier League	38	18	8	12	72	53	62	6th (Note: Club's best top-flight finishing position.)	SF	R4	—	—	Alexis Mac Allister	12
2023–24	Premier League	38	12	12	14	55	62	48	11th	R5	R3	UEFA Europa League	Ro16	João Pedro	20
2024–25	Premier League	38	16	13	9	66	59	61	8th	QF	R4	—	—	Kaoru Mitoma; Danny Welbeck	11
2025–26	Premier League	38	14	11	13	52	46	53	8th	R4	R4	—	—	Danny Welbeck	14

== Sources ==
- Camillin, Paul; Weir, Stewart (2001). Albion – The first 100 years. Brighton: Pavilion. ISBN 0-9532045-0-2.
- Carder, Tim; Harris, Roger (1997). Albion A–Z: A Who's Who of Brighton & Hove Albion F.C. Hove: Goldstone Books. ISBN 0-9521337-1-7.
- Carder, Tim; Harris, Roger (1993). Seagulls! The Story of Brighton & Hove Albion F.C. Hove: Goldstone Books. ISBN 0-9521337-0-9.
- Rollin, Glenda; Rollin, Jack, eds. (2010). Sky Sports Football Yearbook 2010–2011. London: Headline. ISBN 978-0-7553-6107-6.
- Rollin, Jack (2005). Soccer At War 1939–45. London: Headline. ISBN 978-0-7553-1431-7.
