= 1991–92 Brighton & Hove Albion F.C. season =

1991–92 season of Brighton & Hove Albion

Brighton & Hove Albion
1991–92 season
- Manager: Barry Lloyd
- Stadium: Goldstone Ground
- Second Division: 23rd (relegated)
- FA Cup: Fourth round
- League Cup: Second round
- Full Members Cup: Quarter finals
- Top goalscorer: Gall (14)
- Average home league attendance: 8,002

During the 1991–92 English football season, Brighton & Hove Albion F.C. competed in the Football League Second Division.

== Season summary ==
In the 1991–92 season, Brighton again sold their best players Mike Small and John Byrne, and lost the experienced Steve Gatting in defence. At least this time, the players were sold for a decent price, West Ham United paying £400,000 for Small and Sunderland laying out £235,000 for Byrne. Crowds fell again and the team plummeted for the second time they had sold all their best players and were relegated from Division Two to the New Division Two (after the formation of the Premier League). In the FA Cup third round, a capacity crowd of 18,031 against non-leaguers Crawley Town saw Brighton win 5–0 in what was a local derby. The dissatisfied fans formed the Brighton Independent Supporters Association and staged protests.

== Final league table ==
Pos	Team	Pld	W	D	L	GF	GA	GD	Pts	Qualification or relegation
20	Newcastle United	46	13	13	20	66	84	−18	52	Qualification for the First Division (Note: From the 1992–93 season, the first tier became the Premier League, the second tier - then known as the Second Division - was renamed to the First Division, and the third tier - then known as the Third Division - was renamed to the Second Division.)
21	Oxford United	46	13	11	22	66	73	−7	50	Qualification for the First Division
22	Plymouth Argyle (R)	46	13	9	24	42	64	−22	48	Relegation to the Second Division
23	Brighton & Hove Albion (R)	46	12	11	23	56	77	−21	47	Relegation to the Second Division
24	Port Vale (R)	46	10	15	21	42	59	−17	45	Relegation to the Second Division

Rules for classification: 1) Points; 2) Goal difference; 3) Goals scored
(R) Relegated

== Results ==
Brighton & Hove Albion's score comes first

=== Legend ===
Win	Draw	Loss

=== Football League Second Division ===
Date	Opponent	Venue	Result	Attendance	Scorers
17 August 1991	Tranmere Rovers	H	0–2	9,679	
20 August 1991	Bristol City	A	1–2	11,299	Bissett
24 August 1991	Barnsley	A	2–1	6,066	Wade, Barham
31 August 1991	Wolverhampton Wanderers	H	3–3	10,621	O'Reilly, Barham, Robinson
4 September 1991	Millwall	A	2–1	9,266	Byrne, Codner
7 September 1991	Portsmouth	A	0–0	10,567	
14 September 1991	Watford	H	0–1	8,741	
18 September 1991	Port Vale	H	3–1	5,790	Byrne, Meade, Robinson
21 September 1991	Derby County	A	1–3	12,004	Meade
28 September 1991	Bristol Rovers	H	3–1	6,392	Codner (2), Byrne
5 October 1991	Sunderland	A	2–4	15,119	Byrne, Robinson
12 October 1991	Ipswich Town	H	2–2	9,010	Byrne, Chivers
19 October 1991	Charlton Athletic	A	0–2	5,598	
26 October 1991	Swindon Town	H	0–2	7,370	
30 October 1991	Leicester City	H	1–2	6,424	Codner
2 November 1991	Blackburn Rovers	A	0–1	9,877	
6 November 1991	Grimsby Town	H	3–0	4,420	Meade (2), Gall
9 November 1991	Middlesbrough	H	1–1	8,720	Gall
16 November 1991	Cambridge United	A	0–0	7,625	
23 November 1991	Oxford United	A	1–3	4,563	Gall
30 November 1991	Plymouth Argyle	H	1–0	6,713	O'Reilly
7 December 1991	Southend United	A	1–2	6,303	Wade
14 December 1991	Newcastle United	H	2–2	7,658	O'Reilly, Farrington
21 December 1991	Millwall	H	3–4	7,598	Gall (2), Chapman
26 December 1991	Leicester City	A	1–2	16,767	Gallacher
28 December 1991	Wolverhampton Wanderers	A	0–2	13,606	
1 January 1992	Bristol City	H	0–0	7,555	
11 January 1992	Barnsley	H	3–1	6,107	Robinson, Wade, Chapman
17 January 1992	Tranmere Rovers	A	1–1	7,179	Meade
1 February 1992	Charlton Athletic	H	1–2	8,870	Walker
8 February 1992	Swindon Town	A	1–2	9,127	Gall
15 February 1992	Oxford United	H	1–2	6,096	Robinson
22 February 1992	Plymouth Argyle	A	1–1	5,259	Gall
29 February 1992	Southend United	H	3–2	8,271	Meade, Codner, Munday
7 March 1992	Newcastle United	A	1–0	24,597	Gall
10 March 1992	Grimsby Town	A	1–0	4,583	Walker
14 March 1992	Blackburn Rovers	H	0–3	10,845	
21 March 1992	Middlesbrough	A	0–4	13,054	
28 March 1992	Cambridge United	H	1–1	7,702	Gall
31 March 1992	Watford	A	1–0	7,589	Meade
11 April 1992	Port Vale	A	1–2	6,441	Gall
15 April 1992	Derby County	H	1–2	8,159	Gall
20 April 1992	Bristol Rovers	A	1–4	6,092	Gall
25 April 1992	Sunderland	H	2–2	9,851	Gall, Codner
29 April 1992	Portsmouth	H	2–1	11,647	Robinson, Meade
2 May 1992	Ipswich Town	A	1–3	26,803	Meade

=== FA Cup ===
Round	Date	Opponent	Venue	Result	Attendance	Goalscorers
R3	4 January 1992	Crawley Town	H	5–0	18,031	Gall, Walker, Chapman (2, 1 pen), Meade
R4	25 January 1992	Bolton Wanderers	A	1–2	12,635	Meade

=== League Cup ===
Round	Date	Opponent	Venue	Result	Attendance	Goalscorers
R2 1st Leg	24 September 1991	Brentford	A	1–4	4,927	Robinson
R2 2nd Leg	9 October 1991	Brentford	H	4–2 (lost 5–6 on agg)	28,580	Byrne (2), Codner, Meade

=== Full Members Cup ===
Round	Date	Opponent	Venue	Result	Attendance	Goalscorers
SR2	23 October 1991	Wimbledon	H	3–2	2,796	Barham, Robinson, Chivers
SQF	26 November 1991	West Ham United	A	0–2	8,146	

== Squad ==
Note: Flags indicate national team as defined under FIFA eligibility rules; some limited exceptions apply. Players may hold more than one non-FIFA nationality.

Pos.	Nation	Player
GK	ENG	Mark Beeney
GK	ENG	Perry Digweed
GK	USA	Juergen Sommer (on loan from Luton Town)
DF	ENG	Nicky Bissett
DF	ENG	Ian Chapman
DF	ENG	Gary Chivers
DF	ENG	John Crumplin
DF	SCO	Bernie Gallacher
DF	ROU	Ștefan Iovan
DF	IRL	Paul McCarthy
DF	ENG	Stuart Munday
DF	IRL	Greg O'Dowd
DF	IRL	Gary O'Reilly

Pos.	Nation	Player
MF	ENG	Mark Barham
MF	ENG	Les Briley
MF	AUS	David Clarkson
MF	ENG	Robert Codner
MF	WAL	John Robinson
MF	IRL	Dave Savage
MF	ENG	Clive Walker
MF	ENG	Dean Wilkins
FW	IRL	John Byrne
FW	ENG	Mark Farrington
FW	ENG	Simon Funnell
FW	ENG	Mark Gall
FW	ENG	Raphael Meade
FW	ENG	Bryan Wade
