= 1991 Football League Second Division play-off final =

Association football match in London

- The final was held at Wembley Stadium.
Brighton & Hove Albion	Notts County
1	3
- Date: 2 June 1991
- Venue: Wembley Stadium, London
- Referee: David Elleray (Harrow)
- Attendance: 59,940

The 1991 Football League Second Division play-off final was an association football match which was played on 2 June 1991 at Wembley Stadium, London, between Brighton & Hove Albion and Notts County. The match was to determine the third and final team to gain promotion from the Football League Second Division, the second tier of English football, to the First Division. The top three teams of the 1990–91 Football League Second Division season gained automatic promotion to the First Division, while the clubs placed from fourth to seventh place in the table took part in play-off semi-finals; Notts County ended the season in fourth position, two places ahead of Brighton & Hove Albion. The winners of these semi-finals competed for the final place for the 1991–92 season in the First Division. Middlesbrough and Millwall were the losing semi-finalists.

The match was played in front of a Wembley crowd of 59,940 spectators and was refereed by David Elleray. Brighton started strongly but Notts County took the lead in the first half of the final with a Tommy Johnson goal. Brighton hit the post and the bar either side of half time, before Johnson made it 2–0 midway through the second half. Notts County added a third goal through Dave Regis before Dean Wilkins scored a late consolation goal, to end the game 3–1.

In their following season, Notts County finished 21st in the First Division, and were relegated back to the second tier of English football. Brighton's next season also ended with their relegation: they finished in 23rd position and dropped into the third tier.

== Route to the final ==
Football League Second Division final table, leading positions
Pos	Team	Pld	W	D	L	GF	GA	GD	Pts
1	Oldham Athletic	46	25	13	8	83	53	+30	88
2	West Ham United	46	24	15	7	60	34	+26	87
3	Sheffield Wednesday	46	22	16	8	80	51	+29	82
4	Notts County	46	23	11	12	76	55	+21	80
5	Millwall	46	20	13	13	70	51	+19	73
6	Brighton & Hove Albion	46	21	7	18	63	69	−6	70
7	Middlesbrough	46	20	9	17	66	47	+19	69

Notts County finished the regular 1990–91 season in fourth place in the Football League Second Division, the second tier of the English football league system, two places and ten points ahead of Brighton & Hove Albion. Both therefore missed out on the three automatic places for promotion to the First Division and instead took part in the play-offs, along with Middlesbrough and Millwall, to determine the fourth promoted team. Notts County finished seven points behind West Ham United (who were promoted in second place) and eight behind league winners Oldham Athletic.

Brighton & Hove Albion had qualified for the play-offs with a free kick in the last minute of the final league game of the regular season, to beat Ipswich Town 2–1 and secure sixth place, despite having negative goal difference. Their opponents in their play-off semi-final were Millwall with the first leg taking place at the Goldstone Ground in Hove on 19 May 1991. Millwall took the lead on 14 minutes after a poor clearance from Ștefan Iovan found Paul Stephenson whose shot from 25 yards (23 m) beat Perry Digweed in the Brighton goal. Five minutes before half time, Mark Barham made it 1–1 when he took advantage of poor defending from David Thompson. On 53 minutes, a weak backpass was intercepted by Brighton's Mike Small who score. Three minutes later, Clive Walker made it 3–1 and in the 60th minute, Robert Codner scored from a Small pass, with the game ending 4–1. Walker was forced to leave the game with a suspected broken arm. The return leg took place three days later at The Den in London. Millwall's John McGinlay scored early in the first half, but a minute after the break Codner levelled the match after converting a cross from Small. Despite late pressure from Millwall, John Robinson scored his first goal for Brighton, making it 2–1. No further goals were scored and Brighton progressed to the final with a 6–2 aggregate score.

Notts County faced Middlesbrough in their play-off semi-final with the first leg being hosted at Ayresome Park in Middlesbrough. Phil Turner opened the scoring for the visitors when he chipped a Dave Regis pass over Andy Dibble in the Middlesbrough goal. Jimmy Phillips then equalised from a John Hendrie cross and the match ended 1–1. The second leg was held at Meadow Lane in Nottingham three days later. After a goalless first half, Paul Harding scored his first goal in professional football, putting the home side ahead in the 78th minute with a header from a Mark Draper cross. Notts County won the match 1–0, their eighth victory in nine games, and qualified for the final with a 2–1 aggregate win.

== Match ==
=== Background ===
Neither team had featured in the second tier play-offs before. It was Brighton & Hove Albion's first visit to Wembley since they lost the 1983 FA Cup Final replay. The club had last played top-tier football in the 1982–83 season. Notts County were aiming for back-to-back promotions, having won the 1990 Football League Third Division play-off final 2–0 against Tranmere Rovers. They had not played at the highest level of English football since they were relegated in the 1983–84 season. In the matches between the two sides during the regular season, Notts County won their home game at Meadow Lane on New Year's Day 1991 while the return fixture in April ended in a goalless draw. Brighton's top scorer during the regular season was Small with 20 goals (15 in the league, 2 in the FA Cup, 1 in League Cup and 2 in Full Members' Cup), followed by John Byrne with a total of 11 goals (9 in the league and 2 in the FA Cup). For Notts County, Tommy Johnson was the leading marksman with 19 goals in total (16 in the league and 3 in the League Cup) followed by Kevin Bartlett and Regis (both with 16 goals in total).

Walker returned to the Brighton starting line-up after suffering an arm injury in the semi-final, while Byrne was selected as one of the two substitutes two weeks after having undergone a second cartilage operation. For Notts County, Turner recovered from an ankle injury and was named in the starting eleven. Johnson was aiming to repeat his exploits of the previous season's play-off final where he scored the opening goal against Tranmere Rovers. He had opted to miss out on representing the England national under-23 football team at the Toulon Tournament in order to take part in the play-offs. The referee for the match was David Elleray from Harrow.

=== Summary ===
The match kicked off around 3 p.m. in front of a Wembley Stadium crowd of 59,940. Brighton started on the offence with Barham and Walker exploiting the wings while Small worked to disrupt the Notts County defence. They dominated the first 20 minutes but after Walker's shot was blocked, Notts County began to get a foothold in the match. In the 29th minute, Notts County won a controversial corner: Chivers tackled Dean Thomas and the ball appeared to have gone out off the Notts County player, but Elleray awarded the corner against Brighton. A short pass from the set play from Turner found Thomas. He played the ball back to Turner whose cross was met by Johnson who scored past Digweed in the Brighton goal. Just before half-time, Walker passed to Gary Chivers who returned the pass: Chivers jumped to head the ball goal-bound but it rebounded off the near post.

Three minutes into the second half Brighton struck the frame of the Notts County goal again: Dean Wilkins took a direct free kick from around 30 yards (27 m) which cleared the defensive wall but shaved the crossbar. In the 59th minute, Johnson scored his and his team's second goal of the match, beating Digweed from a narrow angle. Thirteen minutes later, Regis scored to make it 3–0 to Notts County. Colin Pates headed out a Draper free kick but it struck Regis who bundled it over the line. Wilkins scored a late consolation goal after Byrne, who had come on as a substitute, had gone on a dribbling run and sent in a low cross. The full-time score was 3–1 and Notts County were promoted to the top tier of English football for the first time since 1984.

=== Details ===
2 June 1991
15:00

Brighton & Hove Albion	1–3	Notts County
Wilkins 89'		Johnson 29', 59'; Regis 71'

Wembley Stadium, London
Attendance: 59,940
Referee: David Elleray

GK	(England) Perry Digweed
DF	(England) Gary Chivers	Booked
DF	(England) Steve Gatting		(substituted off) 62'
DF	(England) Dean Wilkins
DF	(England) Nicky Bissett
DF	(England) Colin Pates
MF	(England) Mark Barham
MF	(Romania) Ștefan Iovan		(substituted off) 62'
MF	(England) Clive Walker
FW	(England) Robert Codner
FW	(England) Mike Small	Booked
Substitutes:
DF	(England) Ian Chapman		(substituted on) 62'
FW	(Republic of Ireland) John Byrne		(substituted on) 62'
Manager:
(England) Barry Lloyd

GK	(England) Steve Cherry
DF	(England) Charlie Palmer
DF	(England) Alan Paris
DF	(England) Craig Short
DF	(England) Dean Yates
MF	(Republic of Ireland) Don O'Riordan
MF	(Wales) Dean Thomas	Booked
MF	(England) Phil Turner
MF	(England) Mark Draper		(substituted off) 81'
FW	(England) Dave Regis		(substituted off) 90'
FW	(England) Tommy Johnson
Substitutes:
MF	(England) Paul Harding		(substituted on) 81'
FW	(England) Kevin Bartlett		(substituted on) 90'
Manager:
(England) Neil Warnock

== Post-match ==
Notts County became the seventh team to win back-to-back promotions from the third tier to the first tier, but the first to do so through the play-offs both times. In their following season, they finished 21st in the First Division, and were relegated back to the second tier of English football. Brighton's next season also ended with their relegation: they finished in 23rd position and dropped into the third tier.

According to the Chelsea chairman Ken Bates, he approached Warnock with a provisional three-year deal to become manager of the club before the play-offs but he turned down the move citing his desire to remain continue working with his assistant Mick Jones at Notts County. Warnock later claimed he had "no regrets" that he did not accept the offer, suggesting that he remained with his promoted team because he "wanted to stay loyal to a group of players who had been fantastic for [him]." He was sacked by Notts County in January 1993 with the club bottom of the Second Division.
