= List of Brighton & Hove Albion F.C. records and statistics =

Brighton & Hove Albion Football Club is a professional football club based in the city of Brighton and Hove, East Sussex, England.

This list encompasses the records set by the club and players.

== Team records ==
=== Highest overall league finish ===
6th place, 2022–23 Premier League

=== Record wins ===
- 14–2 v Brighton Amateurs, FA Cup Q1, 4 October 1902
- 10–1 v Wisbech Town, FA Cup R1, 13 November 1965 (FA Cup)
- 9–1 v Newport County, FL D3(S), 18 April 1951;
- 9–1 v Southend United, FL D3, 27 November 1965 (Football League)

=== Record defeats ===
- 0–18 v Norwich City, wartime, 25 December 1940
- 0–9 v Middlesbrough, FL D2, 23 August 1958 (Football League)
- 0–8 v Northampton Town, League Cup R4 Rep., 1 November 1966
- 0–7 v Nottingham Forest, EPL, 1 February 2025

=== Streaks ===
- Longest run unbeaten 22 games, May – December 2015

== Player records ==
=== Goalscorers ===
- Most goals in a season: Peter Ward, 36 goals (1976–77)
- Most goals in the top division: Danny Welbeck, 46 goals
- Most goals in the Premier League: Danny Welbeck, 46 goals
- Most goals in the FA Cup: Arthur Attwood, 19 goals
- Most goals in European competition: João Pedro, 6 goals

=== Top goalscorers ===
Tommy Cook is officially recognised by the club as their top scorer, with 123 goals scored in 209 appearances between 1922 and 1929.

Bert Stephens scored 174 goals between 1935 and 1948, however only 86 of these were scored in competitive matches. The remainder were scored during wartime fixtures when competitive football was suspended.

Competitive, professional matches only.

Rank	Player	Years	League	FA Cup	League Cup	Other	Total
1	Tommy Cook	1921–1929	114	9	0	0	123
2	Glenn Murray	2008–2011; 2016–2021	103	6	2	0	111
3	Kit Napier	1966–1972	84	9	6	0	99
4	Peter Ward	1975–1980; 1982–1983	81	3	11	0	95
5	Bert Stephens	1935–1948	86	8	0	0	94
6	Albert Mundy	1953–1958	87	3	0	0	90
6	Bobby Zamora	2000–2003; 2015–2016	83	4	2	1	90

=== Most appearances ===
Ernie “Tug” Wilson has the most appearances for the club, playing a total of 566 matches between 1922 and 1936.

=== Transfers ===
==== Record transfer fees paid ====
Rank	Pos.	Player	Transferred from	Fee	Date	Source
1	DF	(Croatia) Luka Vušković	(England) Tottenham Hotspur	£46,000,000	July 2026	BBC Sport
2	FW	(France) Georginio Rutter	(England) Leeds United	£42,500,000	August 2024	BBC Sport
3	FW	(Brazil) João Pedro	(England) Watford	£30,000,000	July 2023	BBC Sport
3	FW	(The Gambia) Yankuba Minteh	(England) Newcastle United	£30,000,000	July 2024	BBC Sport
3	MF	(Netherlands) Mats Wieffer	(Netherlands) Feyenoord	£30,000,000	July 2024	BBC Sport
6	FW	(Greece) Charalampos Kostoulas	(Greece) Olympiacos	£29,800,000	July 2025	BBC Sport
7	MF	(Denmark) Matt O'Riley	(Scotland) Celtic	£25,000,000	August 2024	BBC Sport
7	MF	(Germany) Brajan Gruda	(Germany) Mainz 05	£25,000,000	August 2024	BBC Sport
7	MF	(Turkey) Ferdi Kadioglu	(Turkey) Fenerbahce	£25,000,000	August 2024	BBC Sport
10	MF	(Cameroon) Carlos Baleba	(France) Lille	£23,200,000	August 2023	BBC Sport

==== Record transfer fees received ====
Rank	Pos.	Player	Transferred to	Fee	Date	Source
1	MF	(Ecuador) Moisés Caicedo	(England) Chelsea	£100,000,000	August 2023	BBC Sport
2	MF	(Cameroon) Carlos Baleba	(England) Manchester United	£65,000,000	August 2026	BBC Sport
3	DF	(Spain) Marc Cucurella	(England) Chelsea	£55,000,000	August 2022	BBC Sport
3	FW	(Brazil) João Pedro	(England) Chelsea	£55,000,000	July 2025	BBC Sport
5	DF	(Netherlands) Jan Paul van Hecke	(England) Tottenham Hotspur	£52,000,000	June 2026	BBC Sport
6	DF	(England) Ben White	(England) Arsenal	£50,000,000	July 2021	BBC Sport
7	MF	(Argentina) Alexis Mac Allister	(England) Liverpool	£55,000,000	June 2023	BBC Sport
8	MF	(Mali) Yves Bissouma	(England) Tottenham Hotspur	£25,700,000	June 2022	BBC Sport
9	GK	(Spain) Robert Sánchez	(England) Chelsea	£25,000,000	August 2023	BBC Sport
10	GK	(England) Carl Rushworth	(England) Coventry City	£22,500,000	August 2026	BBC Sport

== Honours ==
=== Player of the Season ===
- 25/26 (Turkey) Ferdi Kadıoğlu
- 24/25 (Netherlands) Jan Paul van Hecke
- 23/24 (Germany) Pascal Gross
- 22/23 (Ecuador) Moises Caicedo
- 21/22 (Spain) Marc Cucurella
- 20/21 (England) Lewis Dunk
- 19/20 (England) Lewis Dunk
- 18/19 (Republic of Ireland) Shane Duffy
- 17/18 (Germany) Pascal Gross
- 16/17 (France) Anthony Knockaert
- 15/16 (Israel) Beram Kayal
- 14/15 (Spain) Iñigo Calderón
- 13/14 (England) Matthew Upson
- 12/13 (Scotland) Liam Bridcutt
- 11/12 (Scotland) Liam Bridcutt
- 10/11 (Egypt) Adam El-Abd
- 09/10 (Wales) Andrew Crofts
- 08/09 (England) Andrew Whing
- 07/08 (England) Tommy Elphick
- 06/07 (England) Dean Hammond
- 05/06 (Republic of Ireland) Paul McShane
- 04/05 (Scotland) Adam Virgo
- 03/04 (England) Guy Butters
- 02/03 (England) Danny Cullip
- 01/02 (England) Bobby Zamora
- 00/01 (England) Bobby Zamora
- 99/00 (England) Danny Cullip
- 98/99 (England) Gary Hart
- 97/98 (England) Jeff Minton
- 96/97 (England) Stuart Storer
- 95/96 (England) Ian Chapman
- 94/95 (England) Peter Smith
- 93/94 (Wales) Kurt Nogan
- 92/93 (England) Steve Foster
- 91/92 (England) Mark Gall
- 90/91 (England) Perry Digweed
- 89/90 (England) Keith Dublin
- 88/89 (England) John Keeley
- 87/88 (England) Garry Nelson
- 86/87 (England) Terry Connor
- 85/86 (Wales) Dean Saunders
- 84/85 (England) Graham Moseley
- 83/84 (England) Jimmy Case
- 82/83 (England) Gary Stevens
- 81/82 (England) Andy Ritchie
- 80/81 (Republic of Ireland) Michael Robinson
- 79/80 (England) Steve Foster
- 78/79 (Republic of Ireland) Mark Lawrenson
- 77/78 (Wales) Peter O'Sullivan
- 76/77 (England) Brian Horton
- 75/76 Not awarded
- 74/75 Not awarded
- 73/74 (England) Norman Gall
- 72/73 (England) Eddie Spearritt
- 71/72 (England) Bert Murray
- 70/71 (England) Norman Gall
- 69/70 (Scotland) Stewart Henderson
- 68/69 (Northern Ireland) John Napier
