= Buster Brown (disambiguation) =

Buster Brown was an early 20th-century U.S. comic strip character.

Buster Brown may also refer to:

== People ==
- Buster Brown (baseball) (1881–1914), American baseball pitcher
- Buster Brown (footballer) (1910–1993), English footballer
- Buster Brown (musician) (1911–1976), American blues musician
- Buster Brown (Texas politician), member of Texas Senate, District 21, 1945–1949
- Buster Brown (tap dancer) (1913–2002)
- J. E. "Buster" Brown (born 1940), Texas state senator, 1981–2002
- James Sutherland Brown (1881–1951), Canadian Military Officer
- Oliver Brown (footballer) (1908–1953), also known as Buster Brown, English footballer
- R. M. Brown (1885–1927), American football coach
- Ulysses Brown (1920–1942), American baseball catcher in the Negro leagues
- Buster Brown (Canadian football) (c. 1929–2002), Canadian football player

== Other ==
- Buster Brown & Company, shoe company that sells Buster Brown shoes
- Buster Brown (Australian band) (1973–1976), Australian rock music group
- Buster Brown (American band), a glam metal band from Louisville, Kentucky
