= Ken Bennett (disambiguation) =

Ken Bennett (born 1959) is an American politician.

Ken Bennett may also refer to:

- Ken Bennett (Australian footballer) (1940–2023), played for Collingwood
- Ken Bennett (English footballer) (1921–1994), played for Southend United, Bournemouth, Brighton & Hove Albion, Crystal Palace
