= Journeyman (sports) =

Term with varied meanings in American/British English

In American English, a journeyman is an athlete who is technically competent but unable to excel. The term is used elsewhere (such as in American, British and Australian contexts) to refer to a professional sportsperson who plays for numerous clubs during their career. In Britain, the term is also used derogatorily, along with mercenary, to refer to players who join various affluent clubs purely in search of higher contractual payouts rather than to further their career; usually clubs which they would likely never join otherwise.

== American English ==
Journeymen often make up a significant part of the roster of even the richest clubs because of the difficulty of guaranteeing all of their star players sufficient playing time and restrictions on a team's payroll (salary cap or financial penalties for overspending). This is especially true in the context of baseball, where journeymen often make up large parts of a team's pitching staff primarily in middle relief (sixth through eighth inning) or specialist roles, such as a left or right handed specialist with two out in an inning, and contribute crucially to a team's success. Many journeymen can be highly experienced, and they often play a "utility" role to cover for injuries or tactical changes as required. Some such players can be signed and cut by multiple teams in a single season, such as NFL quarterback Josh Johnson in 2015.

Journeymen players are usually distinguished from an elite or "star" player. Quirk and Fort note that the concerns of journeymen players and superstars, with respect to contract and other negotiations, differ: Superstars are concerned with the preservation of their rights to be free agents, whilst journeymen players are concerned with issues such as league minimum salaries and player pensions. Fort observes that this leads to conflicts between journeymen and superstars, such as (Fort's example) the 1995 attempt by a group of superstar players to derail the agreement between the NBA and its players' association. Holt and Mason note that in football, golf, flat racing, snooker, cricket, and other sports there is a clear distinction in earnings between the few rich stars in each sport and the journeyman professionals. They state that snooker has "an élite of perhaps twenty players" and point to a distinction between high earning test cricketers with six figure wages and "the average county professional" (for whom they give Simon Hughes, who earned £50,000 in the whole of his twelve years in county cricket, as an example). Vamplew describes how league cricket in the 1890s provided little attraction for star cricketers but was greatly attractive to journeymen players in county cricket, eventually forcing the counties to raise their conventional maximum wage, offer winter pay to more players, and expand the fixture lists.

O'Leary notes as significant the fact that whilst star football players will be treated with lenience by clubs, for journeyman footballers the taking of recreational drugs usually terminates their careers. (He gives Roger Stanislaus and Craig Whitington as examples.) Clubs will regard it as worthwhile to wait for stars to become available for team selection after suspension or imprisonment, but not for journeymen.

=== Journeyman quarterback ===
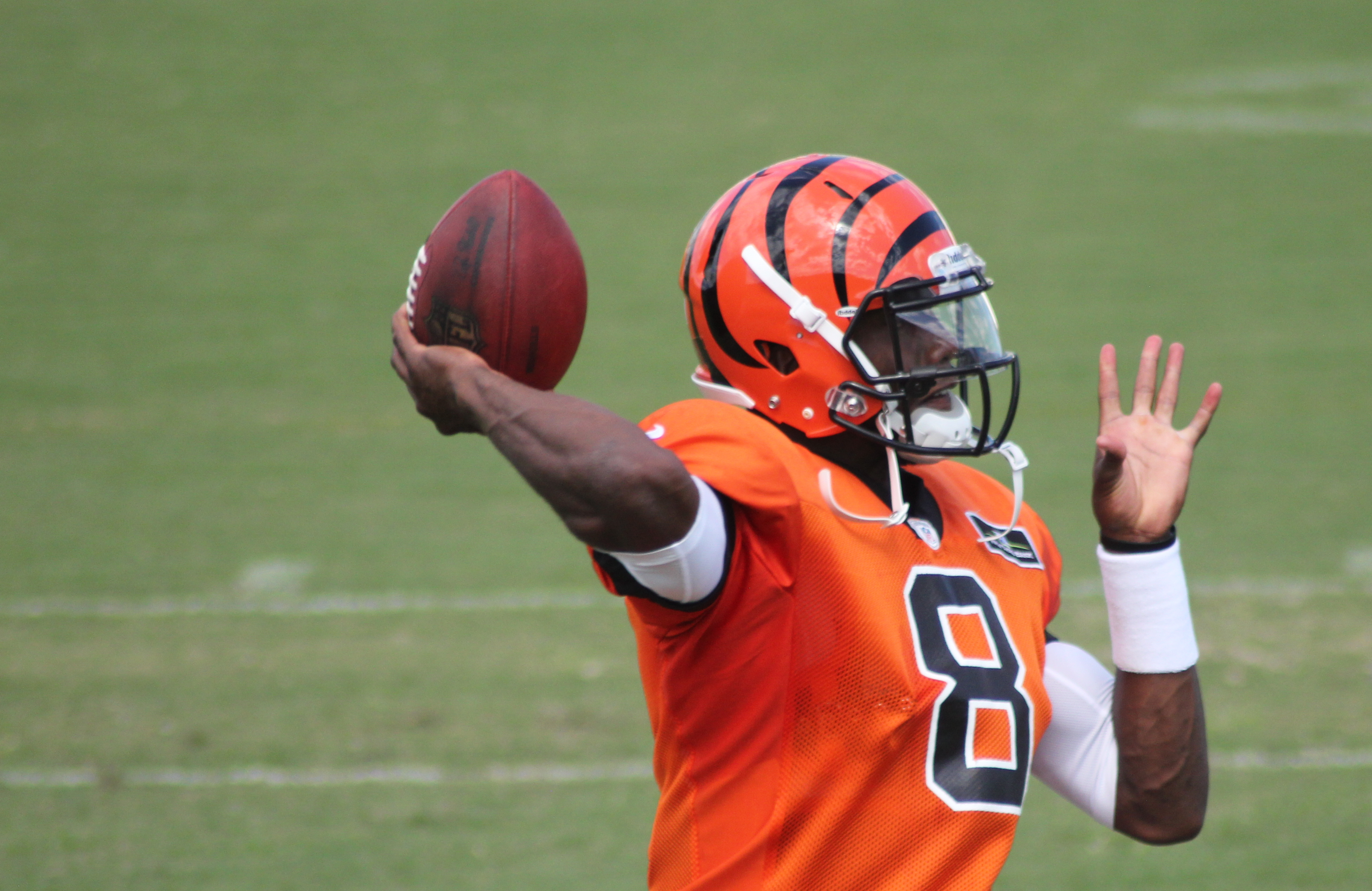
Josh Johnson been a member of 14 different NFL teams, the most in league history among quarterbacks. (Note: Placekicker Shayne Graham was a member of 15 different NFL teams.)

In American football, Marc Sessler on NFL.com described the definition of a journeyman quarterback as "hazy". He limited his discussion in the article to quarterbacks who had played for four or more teams in the National Football League and occasionally others such as the Canadian Football League (CFL) with "impactful, memory-spinning moments along the way", despite not being considered among the best quarterbacks in the league. Players described as such include Doug Flutie, Vinny Testaverde, Steve DeBerg, Ryan Fitzpatrick, Josh McCown, Brian Hoyer, and Josh Johnson. The term is descriptive rather than definitive; Professional Football Researchers Association member Joe Zagorski defined Pro Football Hall of Fame inductee Fran Tarkenton as one despite only playing for two teams in his career, owing to him being traded between said organizations.

Despite the occasionally pejorative connotation associated with the term, many backups are journeymen who sign short-term deals when the starter is injured. NFL.com's Jeffri Chadiha described this role as "not an easy transition, but the job is vital to the success of many organizations. The quarterbacks who last in that role embrace the idea that they'll be facing situations that aren't optimal whenever they're pressed into service." Some journeyman quarterbacks such as Flutie and Testaverde have had spurts of postseason success, with others such as Trent Dilfer, Brad Johnson, Nick Foles and Sam Darnold winning the Super Bowl as starters.

Since they are usually carrying a playbook, communicating with the starter, and observing patterns, being a journeyman is often a stepping stone to coaching careers. Quarterbacks who have been described as journeymen before becoming NFL coaches include McCown, Mike Kafka, and Sean Mannion. Doug Pederson was a journeyman before winning Super Bowl LII as Foles' head coach.

In Canadian football, quarterback Kevin Glenn was a member of every team in the CFL.

=== Boxing, kickboxing and mixed martial arts ===
In boxing, kickboxing and mixed martial arts, a journeyman is a fighter who has adequate skill, but is not of the caliber of a contender or gatekeeper. Journeymen typically serve as opponents for young up-and-coming prospects and will often step in on short notice should a scheduled fighter get injured or be otherwise unavailable for a bout. While no match for contenders, they may still have a winning record against less-skilled fighters.

In testimony to the United States Senate Committee on Commerce, Science, and Transportation, DeGuardia states that becoming a journeyman is the fate of many professional boxers, and that a boxer will realize that he has become a journeyman "after about 10 years" in the profession. Journeymen boxers float "from promoter to promoter, or manager to manager, hoping to get placed as opponents in fights" by promoters. They will "fight all the time, anywhere, in order to make enough money to get by." In earlier testimony to the committee, it had been reported that some journeymen boxers regard themselves as existing in the sport solely as "a body for better men to beat on."

Svinth reports that the activities of journeymen boxers changed over the course of the 20th century, with journeymen of the 1920s fighting a couple of times per week and spending little time in the gymnasium, but journeymen of the 1990s fighting a couple of times per year and sparring in the gymnasium three or four nights per week.

==== Quotes ====
Journeymen are the foundation of boxing...Journeymen make boxing. Without journeymen you don’t get Miguel Cotto or Nate Campbell, or Joan Guzmán...You give me ten guys who are journeymen and I'll give you fifteen or twenty guys that they (the journeymen) made world champions.

— Nate Campbell, IBF & WBO Lightweight Champion

I sold my soul to the flesh trade. I paraded isolated muscles controlled by an isolated mind. Promoters and managers are the farmers and we are the cattle.

— Michael Murray, former boxer, author of The Journeyman

== British English ==
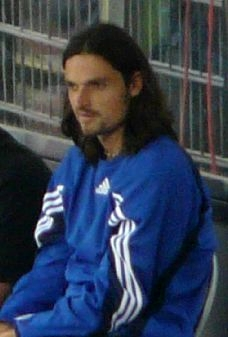
Lutz Pfannenstiel played for 27 clubs on six continents.

In British English, a journeyman is a player who has represented many clubs over his career. Prime examples from association football are: German goalkeeper Lutz Pfannenstiel, who represented 27 clubs, and he is currently the only athlete to have played professionally in all six FIFA Confederations; Trevor Benjamin, who has represented 29 clubs since 1995; Drewe Broughton, who has made 18 transfers in his career; John Burridge, who played for 29 clubs in a career spanning almost 30 years; Jefferson Louis who, since the 1990s, has represented 34 clubs and Dominica once; his cousin Richard Pacquette who boasts 19 clubs and even international honours in 10 seasons; and Sebastián Abreu, who in 2017 broke the world record for most clubs played by a professional; as of 2024, at the age of 47, has played for 32 clubs in his career.

The term is also used in Australian English and New Zealand English in the same context, with the added idiom of "recycling" for the tendency for the clubs in the relatively small structure of Australian football to continually rotate the same experienced, professional, but generally unspectacular players around the league to fill gaps in the club squads. An example of such "recycling" is found with Antony Golec, who has played for 7 of the 12 current A-League clubs, never staying with one for more than 3 seasons in a row.

The term is also used derogatorily, along with mercenary, to refer to players who join various affluent clubs purely in search of higher contractual payouts, clubs which they would likely never join otherwise.

In contrast, players who represent the same club throughout their entire careers are called one-club men.
