= Tony James =

Tony James may refer to:

- Tony James (chemist) (born 1964), professor of chemistry
- Tony James (English footballer) (born 1967), English footballer
- Tony James (Welsh footballer, born 1919) (1919–1981), Welsh footballer
- Tony James (Welsh footballer, born 1978), Welsh footballer
- Tony James (musician) (born 1953), English pop musician
- Tony James (cyclist) (born 1955), British cyclist
- Hamilton E. James (born 1951), known as Tony James, president of Blackstone

== See also ==
- Anthony James (disambiguation)
- Antonio James (disambiguation)
