= James Anthony =

James Anthony may refer to:

- James Anthony (musician) (born 1955), Canadian musician
- James C. Anthony, medical professor at Michigan State University
- James Anthony (psychoanalyst) (1916–2014), British psychoanalyst

== See also ==
- Anthony James (disambiguation)
