= Glenn Murray =

English footballer (born 1983)

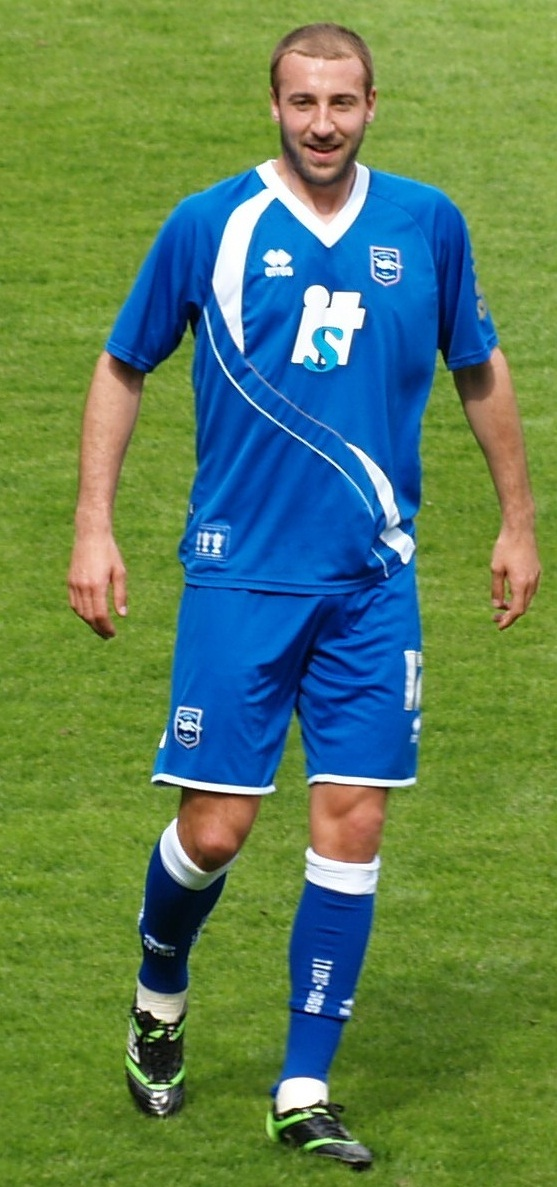
- Murray pre-match for Brighton & Hove Albion in 2011

Personal information
- Full name: Glenn Murray
- Date of birth: 25 September 1983 (age 43)
- Place of birth: Maryport, England
- Height: 6 ft 0 in (1.83 m)
- Position: Striker

Senior career*
Years	Team	Apps	(Gls)
2002–2004	Workington		
2004	Wilmington Hammerheads	14	(3)
2004	Barrow	6	(6)
2004–2007	Carlisle United	46	(5)
2006	→ Stockport County (loan)	11	(3)
2006–2007	→ Rochdale (loan)	12	(4)
2007–2008	Rochdale	42	(21)
2008–2011	Brighton & Hove Albion	118	(54)
2011–2015	Crystal Palace	112	(44)
2014	→ Reading (loan)	18	(8)
2015–2017	AFC Bournemouth	19	(3)
2016–2017	→ Brighton & Hove Albion (loan)	26	(15)
2017–2021	Brighton & Hove Albion	115	(34)
2020–2021	→ Watford (loan)	5	(0)
2021	Nottingham Forest	16	(2)
Total		560	(202)
- * Club domestic league appearances and goals

Glenn Murray (born 25 September 1983) is an English football pundit and former professional player who played as a striker between 2002 and 2021.

Best known for his two spells with Brighton & Hove Albion, Murray also played for Workington Reds, Wilmington Hammerheads, Barrow, Carlisle United, Stockport County, Rochdale, Crystal Palace, Reading, AFC Bournemouth, Watford and Nottingham Forest.

He held the record for most goals scored in a Championship season whilst playing for Crystal Palace, with 30 goals in the 2012–13 season, until Ivan Toney scored 31 in the 2020–21 season for Brentford, which itself was surpassed by Aleksandar Mitrović who scored 43 in the 2021-22 season for Fulham.

He announced his retirement on 31 May 2021, after a short spell with Nottingham Forest. Murray scored 217 goals in 624 appearances for 12 different clubs. He played for 13 clubs overall, starting with local side Workington Reds.

Murray now works as a pundit.

== Career ==
=== Early career ===
Born in Maryport, Cumbria, Murray began his playing career playing for non-League side Workington Reds before joining American team Wilmington Hammerheads in 2004. He spent one season with the North Carolina club playing 14 times and scoring three goals in the USL Professional League. After his time in America he joined Barrow where he scored seven goals in seven games. Murray then signed for Conference National side Carlisle United and was part of the Conference play-off-winning team in 2005 and League Two-winning side a season later where they also came runners-up in the Football League Trophy, with Murray coming on as a substitute.

Murray joined Stockport County on loan for two months and he returned to Carlisle after this loan deal,

=== Rochdale ===
Rochdale manager Steve Parkin then signed Murray on loan until January 2007. Murray then signed for the club on a contract until 2009, for an undisclosed fee. He made his first start for Rochdale in their 7–1 defeat away at Lincoln City on 21 October 2006. His first goal was a 59th-minute equaliser in their match with Barnet on 18 November, but Rochdale lost the match 3–2. Murray made 31 league appearances in his first season with the club and scored 16 goals.

Murray made his first appearance for the 2007–08 season as a 53rd-minute substitute on the opening day in Rochdale's 3–0 loss away to Peterborough United. His first start of the season came in their 2–2 home draw with Stoke City in the first round of the League Cup three days later on 14 August. Murray scored his first goal of the season in a 1–1 home draw with Norwich City in the League Cup second round, and his first league goal of the season came in Rochdale's 4–3 victory away at Shrewsbury Town on 29 September. He made 42 league appearances scoring 21 goals, giving him an average of one goal every two games in his Rochdale career.

=== Brighton & Hove Albion ===
Murray had been linked with a transfer to League One team Brighton & Hove Albion throughout the January transfer window, and finally completed his move to the Withdean Stadium on 25 January 2008 for a reported £300,000. He made his debut four days later, coming on as a 61st-minute substitute for Nathan Elder during the 1–0 defeat away to Northampton Town. He started Albion's next match, on 2 February at home to Crewe Alexandra, and scored two goals on his home debut in the 3–0 victory. Murray scored nine goals for Brighton during the 2007–08 season.

Despite suffering several injuries during the 2008–09 season, Murray made 28 appearances and scored 12 goals. In the team's 4–0 win over Barnet in the first round of the League Cup on 12 August 2008, he was sent off. On 27 September, he netted twice in a 2–2 draw at Northampton Town; his second put the team ahead in added time before Adebayo Akinfenwa equalised. A week later he scored twice in the opening seven minutes and finished with his first hat-trick for the team in a 3–3 draw with Cheltenham Town.

On 17 October 2009, Murray won and converted a penalty for a consolation goal in a 2–1 defeat at Tranmere Rovers, but three minutes later was sent off for a second yellow card. He scored four times in Brighton's 5–2 win away at Wycombe Wanderers on 28 December, a result which moved Brighton out of the relegation zone. Murray's season ended on 24 April 2010 with Brighton's 2–1 win over Bristol Rovers to stay in the division; he was sent off ten minutes after coming on as a substitute for Chris Holroyd.

The 2010–11 season proved to be Murray's best season thus far at Brighton, scoring 22 goals and finishing runner-up to Craig Mackail-Smith as League One top scorer. This included a hat-trick on 1 January 2011 in a 5–0 win over Leyton Orient. On 20 May, the club confirmed that Murray had rejected their final offer of a new contract, so would be available on a free transfer when his contract expired.

=== Crystal Palace ===
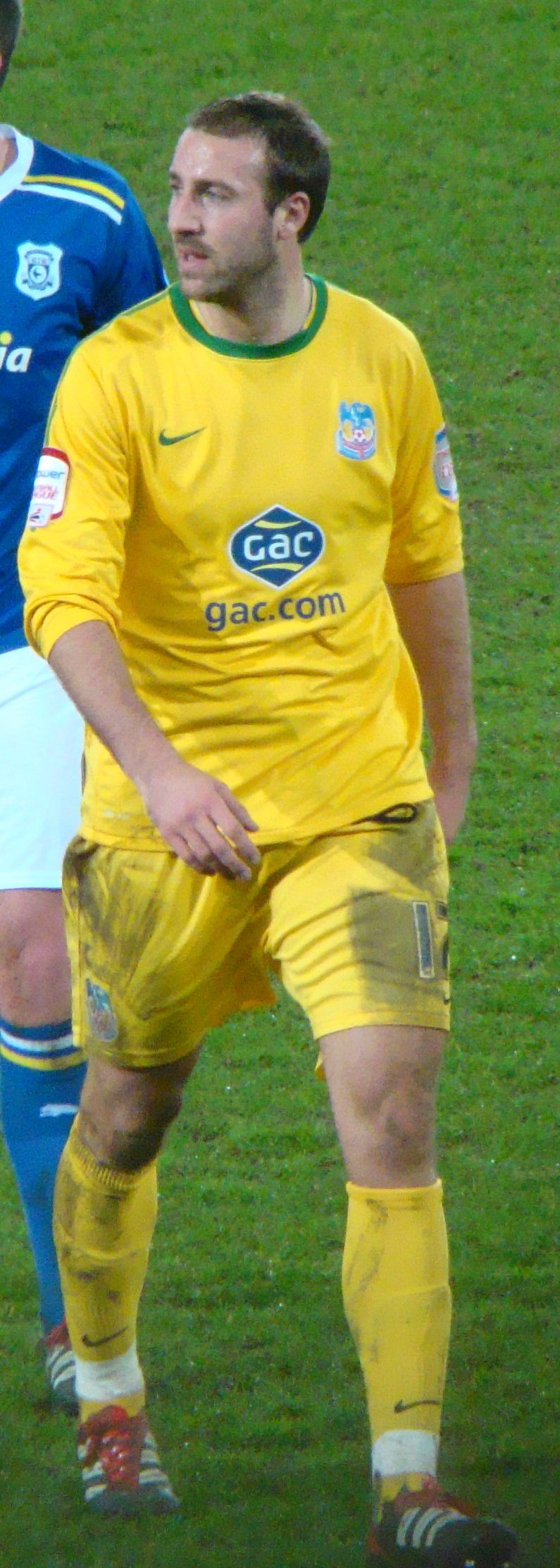
Murray playing for Crystal Palace in 2012

On 24 May 2011, Murray signed a three-year contract with Crystal Palace, Brighton's main rivals. Manager Dougie Freedman said that Murray was the type of player that his squad needed.

He made his debut – his first match in the Championship – in the starting eleven as Palace began the season with a 2–1 loss at Peterborough United on 6 August. He scored his first goal 21 days later, the equaliser in a 1–1 draw against Blackpool at Selhurst Park. On 27 September, he netted as Palace won 3–1 at his former club Brighton. Murray scored the extra-time winner at Old Trafford against Manchester United in the League Cup quarter-finals on 30 November.

On 22 September 2012, Murray scored a hat-trick including two penalties against Cardiff City, and repeated the feat on 6 November against Ipswich Town in a 5–0 victory despite missing a third penalty. He scored twice in a 3–0 home win over former club and now bitter rivals Brighton on 1 December, a result which put Palace on top of the league table.

On 2 February 2013, Murray scored twice in four minutes against South London rivals Charlton Athletic as Palace came from behind to win 2–1. In March, he lost out to Watford's Matěj Vydra as Championship Player of the Season. On 28 March, Murray signed a new three-year contract with Crystal Palace. Murray missed the play-off final, in which Palace secured promotion to the Premier League, having suffered a serious knee injury in the semi-final against Brighton.

Murray came back from injury as a 72nd-minute substitute for Jason Puncheon on 8 February 2014 in a 3–1 home win against West Bromwich Albion. On 2 March, he scored his only goal of the season and his first in the Premier League, winning a late penalty against Swansea City after being fouled by Chico Flores and converting it past Michel Vorm to earn a 1–1 away draw.

On 1 September 2014, transfer deadline day, Murray moved to Championship club Reading on loan until 1 January 2015. He scored twice in his debut match in a 3–0 win over Fulham. Murray scored eight goals in 18 league games for Reading, ending on 26 December with a brace in a 2–2 draw at Brighton where he opened the scoring after 39 seconds.

At the end of January 2015, Murray signed a contract extension with Palace until 2017. On 28 February, he scored twice and was sent off for two bookings as Palace won 3–1 away to West Ham United. Murray opened the scoring as Palace defeated reigning Premier League champions Manchester City 2–1 on 6 April. Murray continued his goalscoring form by giving Palace a 1–0 lead in their 4–1 win at Sunderland on 11 April. Eight days later, Murray was selected in the Football Manager Team of the Decade at the Football League Awards. On 16 May against Liverpool, in Steven Gerrard's final match at Anfield, Murray's penalty was saved by Simon Mignolet but he hit in the rebound to confirm a 3–1 victory.

=== AFC Bournemouth ===
On 7 August 2015, Crystal Palace rejected a £3 million bid for Murray from Premier League rivals AFC Bournemouth. On 1 September, an improved bid of £4 million was accepted, and Murray joined the club on a three-year deal. He scored his first goal for Bournemouth on 3 October in a 1–1 draw with Watford, a fellow newly promoted team, but had a penalty saved late on. He scored a consolation goal in the following match, a 5–1 loss at Manchester City. In December, he scored a late headed goal to clinch a win against reigning champions Chelsea at Stamford Bridge.

=== Return to Brighton & Hove Albion ===
On 3 July 2016, Murray returned to Brighton & Hove Albion on a season-long loan. His second debut for the Sussex side came on 6 August away to Derby County, while his first goal in his second spell came at home to Nottingham Forest six days later; he scored his second in the same match as Albion won 3–0. Brighton repeated that scoreline at Falmer Stadium four days later against Rotherham United, and Murray was again on the scoresheet. On 29 October, Murray scored a hat-trick against Norwich City at Falmer as the Seagulls secured a 5–0 win, and on 18 November he scored his 150th career League goal in a 1–1 draw with Aston Villa.

On 31 January 2017, Murray re-signed permanently for Brighton & Hove Albion on a deal until June 2019. He had scored 15 goals in 28 appearances while on loan to the club in the first half of the season. He contributed 8 more league goals in the remainder of the season, including the opening goal in a 2–1 home win against Wigan Athletic on 17 April that sealed Brighton's promotion to the Premier League for the first time in their history.

Newly promoted Brighton made a positive start to their inaugural Premier League season, sitting in 8th place after eleven games. An unbeaten run of four games from mid-October coincided with Murray hitting a good run of form, with the striker scoring four goals in the three games preceding the November international break. His scoring run began with two against West Ham United in a 3–0 away win, and he followed it up with goals against Southampton at home and Swansea City away, earning Brighton four points. On 8 January 2018, Murray scored the winning goal in Brighton's 2–1 victory over arch rivals and former club Crystal Palace to eliminate them from the FA Cup at the third-round stage. After impressive form scoring 5 in his last 6 games in the run up to England's friendlies in March many fans believed that Murray and Albion captain Lewis Dunk should have been called for the first time, however he and Dunk were overlooked by Gareth Southgate. Murray took the omission with humour and posted a picture on Twitter of him and Dunk with their hands on their heads in disbelief – taken in a previous match – with a caption of laughing emojis.

On 1 September 2018 Murray scored twice to take Brighton from 2–0 down to draw 2–2 with Fulham. His 100th goal for Albion, the only goal of the match at home to Wolverhampton Wanderers on 27 October, made him just the second man – after Tommy Cook with 123 – to reach that milestone. In October after being linked with the England set up again after a run of decent form Murray played down the England talk but would welcome a call-up, however he was not selected in the upcoming squad and from then on the England talk evaporated. Murray signed a one-year contract extension on 13 November that runs to the summer of 2020. After 9 games without scoring, on 29 January 2019 Murray scored another two goals against Fulham in a 4–2 away defeat. This time Fulham came back from 2 goals behind, and won. On 6 February 2019 Murray scored another two goals this time coming off the bench in a fourth round FA Cup replay against West Bromwich Albion where his goals put Brighton 2–1 and 3–1 up in the 3–1 victory. On 9 March 2019 Murray scored his 100th league goal for the Seagulls at his former club and bitter rivals Crystal Palace in a 2–1 away victory. This win meant Brighton won the double over Palace.

Murray scored his first goal of the 2019–20 season in a 2–1 away win over Bristol Rovers in the EFL Cup on 27 August. His first league goal didn't come until 1 February 2020, scoring Brighton's third and the last of the goals in the 3–3 draw at West Ham. In April 2020, Murray alongside captain Lewis Dunk were in pay cuts talks as a result of the impact of COVID-19 with Murray stating, "It's bringing the club together even more" describing the talks with the board as "very positive" and an "eye-opener." Murray only scored one league goal in Brighton's third year in the top flight starting 7 of his 23 appearances in which he also provided one assist. Although Murray had a frustrating season he was still well trusted and remained popular amongst the fans.

On 1 September 2020, Murray signed for Championship club Watford on a one-year loan deal. 10 days later he made his debut in Watford's opening game of the season coming on as a sub in a 1–0 home win over Middlesbrough. On 30 January 2021, Murray was recalled by Brighton, following a significant lack of game time.

After making 6 appearances on loan at Watford, Murray returned to Brighton and 2 days after his return it was announced that he had signed for Nottingham Forest. Murray scored a total of 111 goals in 287 appearances across both of his spells at the club, helping Brighton achieve promotion from League One to the Premier League and to the 2018–19 FA Cup semi final. He sits in second place in Brighton's all time top goalscorers list 12 goals behind Tommy Cook from 1921 to 1929.

=== Nottingham Forest ===
On 1 February 2021, Murray signed a permanent deal with Championship side Nottingham Forest until the end of the season on a free transfer, once again linking up with former Brighton manager Chris Hughton and players Anthony Knockaert and Gaëtan Bong. He made his debut a day later coming on as a substitute in the 76th minute for goalscorer Lewis Grabban in a 2–1 away win over Coventry City. Murray made his first start for Forest 4 days later, scoring his first goals for the club with a brace in a 3–0 away win at league strugglers Wycombe Wanderers, in a match where former Brighton teammate Knockaert also scored with another former Brighton teammate Bong assisting Murray's first goal. He managed 2 goals in his 16 league appearances for Forest.

On 31 May 2021, Murray announced his retirement with immediate effect via social media at the age of 37, thanking "clubs, players and fans I've come across on this life changing journey". Murray achieved 202 goals in 560 league appearances (including his spell in the United States), also scoring 37 times in 148 Premier League matches.

== Television and radio ==
=== Television ===
In August 2019, Murray appeared on A Question of Sport, where he was teamed up with team captain and former cricketer Phil Tufnell and snooker player Mark Selby. He asked to call up former teammate Bruno during his team's loss in the long running game show.

==== Guest appearances ====
- A Question of Sport (14 August 2019) – Guest

=== Punditry ===
==== Television punditry ====
He has appeared as a pundit on several broadcasters coverage of football including Sky Sports.

==== Radio ====
Murray has appeared as a commentating pundit and as a panellist on the 72+ EFL show on BBC Radio 5 Live and also covered 5 Live's Brighton Premier League fixture at home to Tottenham Hotspur on 31 January 2021, this coming one day before he left The Seagulls to sign for Nottingham Forest. He has also made appearances on sport based radio station Talksport.

== Personal life ==
On 24 January 2018, Murray and his wife Stacey were arrested on suspicion of tax fraud totalling £1.1 million. In April 2019, HMRC announced that they had concluded their criminal investigation and no charges had been brought.

== Career statistics ==
Appearances and goals by club, season and competition
Club	Season	League			National Cup (Note: Includes FA Cup)		League Cup (Note: Includes League/EFL Cup)		Other		Total	
Club	Season	Division	Apps	Goals	Apps	Goals	Apps	Goals	Apps	Goals	Apps	Goals
Wilmington Hammerheads	2004	USL Pro Soccer League	14	3	—		—		—		14	3
Barrow	2004–05	Conference North	6	6	0	0	—		1 (Note: Appearance in FA Trophy)	1	7	7
Carlisle United	2004–05	Conference National	19	2	0	0	—		3 (Note: Appearances in Conference National play-offs)	0	22	2
Carlisle United	2005–06	League Two	26	3	1	0	1	0	6 (Note: Appearance(s) in Football League Trophy)	1	34	4
Carlisle United	2006–07	League One	1	0	—		—		1	0	2	0
Carlisle United	Total		46	5	1	0	1	0	10	1	58	6
Stockport County (loan)	2006–07	League Two	11	3	—		0	0	—		11	3
Rochdale	2006–07	League Two	31	16	2	0	0	0	—		33	16
Rochdale	2007–08	League Two	23	9	1	0	2	1	1	0	27	10
Rochdale	Total		54	25	3	0	2	1	1	0	60	26
Brighton & Hove Albion	2007–08	League One	21	9	—		—		—		21	9
Brighton & Hove Albion	2008–09	League One	23	11	1	0	3	1	1	0	28	12
Brighton & Hove Albion	2009–10	League One	32	12	3	2	1	0	1	0	37	14
Brighton & Hove Albion	2010–11	League One	42	22	7	0	0	0	1	0	50	22
Brighton & Hove Albion	Total		118	54	11	2	4	1	3	0	136	57
Crystal Palace	2011–12	Championship	37	6	0	0	6	1	—		43	7
Crystal Palace	2012–13	Championship	42	30	1	1	1	0	1 (Note: Appearance in Championship play-offs)	0	45	31
Crystal Palace	2013–14	Premier League	14	1	0	0	0	0	—		14	1
Crystal Palace	2014–15	Premier League	17	7	2	0	1	0	—		20	7
Crystal Palace	2015–16	Premier League	2	0	—		1	1	—		3	1
Crystal Palace	Total		112	44	3	1	9	2	1	0	125	47
Reading (loan)	2014–15	Championship	18	8	—		—		—		18	8
AFC Bournemouth	2015–16	Premier League	19	3	3	1	0	0	—		22	4
Brighton & Hove Albion	2016–17	Championship	45	23	1	0	1	0	—		47	23
Brighton & Hove Albion	2017–18	Premier League	35	12	3	2	0	0	—		38	14
Brighton & Hove Albion	2018–19	Premier League	38	13	4	2	0	0	—		42	15
Brighton & Hove Albion	2019–20	Premier League	23	1	0	0	1	1	—		24	2
Brighton & Hove Albion	Total		141	49	8	4	2	1	0	0	151	54
Brighton & Hove Albion combined total			259	103	19	6	6	2	3	0	287	111
Watford (loan)	2020–21	Championship	5	0	0	0	1	0	—		6	0
Nottingham Forest	2020–21	Championship	16	2	—		—		—		16	2
Career total			560	202	29	8	19	5	16	2	624	217

== Honours ==
Carlisle United

- Football League Two: 2005–06
- Conference National play-offs: 2005
- Football League Trophy runner-up: 2005–06

Crystal Palace

- Football League Championship play-offs: 2013

Brighton & Hove Albion

- Football League One: 2010–11
- EFL Championship second-place promotion: 2016–17

Individual

- Football League Championship Golden Boot: 2012–13
- PFA Team of the Year: 2012–13 Championship
- The Football League Team of the Decade
