= Antonio James =

Antonio James may refer to:

- Antonio James (discus thrower) (born 1992), American shot putter, weight thrower, hammer thrower, and discus thrower, 2013 NCAA weight throw runner-up for the Michigan State Spartans track and field team
- Antonio G. James (c. 1954–1996), American murderer, see Execution of Antonio James

== See also ==
- Tony James (disambiguation)
- Anthony James (disambiguation)
