= Eric Whitington =

English footballer

Personal information
- Full name: Eric Richard Whitington
- Date of birth: 18 September 1946 (age 80)
- Place of birth: Brighton, England
- Height: 6 ft 1 in (1.85 m)
- Position: Forward

Youth career
- –: Arsenal
- –1964: Chelsea

Senior career*
Years	Team	Apps	(Gls)
1964–1968	Brighton & Hove Albion	32	(8)
1968–19??	Highlands Park		
1971–1973	Crawley Town	62	(42)
- Folkestone
- Eastbourne United
- Horsham
1978	Crawley Town	15	(3)

International career
1964	England youth		
- * Club domestic league appearances and goals

Eric Richard Whitington (born 18 September 1946) is an English former professional footballer who scored 8 goals from 32 appearances in the Football League for Brighton & Hove Albion. He played as a forward. He also played in the South African National Football League for the 1968 title-winning Highlands Park team.

== Life and career ==
Whitington was born in Brighton, where he was selected for Brighton Boys in 1961. His football career began as a schoolboy with Arsenal, after which he joined Chelsea's ground staff. While with Chelsea he played for England at youth international level. He signed for Brighton & Hove Albion in 1964, turned professional the same year, and made his debut for the Third Division club in February 1966. In the 1966–67 season, he was the club's joint top scorer, alongside Kit Napier, with ten goals in all competitions, but a perceived lack of pace stopped him establishing himself as a first-team regular. He was released in 1968, and moved to South Africa to play for Highlands Park, who won the National Football League title in 1968. After returning to England, he played for Crawley Town of the Southern League, Folkestone, Eastbourne United, and for Isthmian League club Horsham, where he was the club's top scorer in the 1975–76 season with 25 goals in 42 League games, before finishing his career back at Crawley.

Whitington's son Craig also played in the Football League.
