= Craig Whitington =

English footballer

Personal information
- Date of birth: 3 September 1970 (age 56)
- Place of birth: Brighton, England
- Position: Striker

Senior career*
Years	Team	Apps	(Gls)
?–1990	Worthing	?	(?)
1990–1993	Crawley Town	173	(72)
1993–1994	Scarborough	27	(10)
1994–1995	Huddersfield Town	1	(0)
1995	→ Rochdale (loan)	1	(0)
1996–1997	Crawley Town	?	(?)
1999	Rottingdean United		
2005–2006	Whitehawk	8	(1)
2007–2008	Brighton North End	25	(12)
2008	Three Bridges	4	(3)
- * Club domestic league appearances and goals

Craig Whitington (born 3 September 1970) is an English former professional footballer, who played for Crawley Town, Scarborough, Huddersfield Town and Rochdale. His father, Eric is also a former professional footballer who played for Chelsea and Brighton & Hove Albion.

== Playing career ==
=== Early career ===
Whitington began his playing career at non-league Worthing in the late 1980s. He then moved onto Crawley in 1991 after he netted a hat-trick at Town Mead in an FA Cup clash with Worthing.

=== Crawley Town ===
In 1990 Whitington joined Crawley Town, the team his father Eric had been a fan's favourite at some years before. Whitington played in the team that reached the third round of the FA Cup in 1991, losing 5–0 at the Goldstone Ground against Brighton & Hove Albion. He scored 75 goals in 173 appearances which prompted interest from Cyprus club Omonicosia, but they couldn't meet the asking price of £100,000. That was a disappointment, as in the same season they went on to play Juventus in the European Cup. Then in December 1993, Fourth Division Scarborough to pay £50,000 for his services.

=== Scarborough ===
In 1993 Whitington arrived in Scarborough after being signed by former Crawley boss Steve Wicks and in his only proper run in the Football League he scored 10 goals in 27 appearances. Then in the summer of 1994, the then Huddersfield Town manager, Neil Warnock signed Whitington for £20,000 after seeing him in a pre-season Yorkshire Electricity Cup clash against Huddersfield for Scarborough.

=== Huddersfield Town ===
Whitington was placed on the bench for a League Cup tie with Scunthorpe United and then the next game against Leyton Orient Whitington made his debut wearing the number 10 shirt alongside Andrew Booth. It turned out to be his only game for the club and he was sent out to Rochdale during the 1994–95 season. Whitington remained at Town until he was sacked in early 1996 for a drugs offence.

=== Crawley Town (Again) ===
Whitington's ban for his drugs offence lasted for 10 months and when the ban was completed the only club that showed any interest were his old club; Crawley Town. However, he failed to live up to his promise and his second spell wasn't as good as the first and he left Crawley in 1997, due to a troublesome knee injury.

=== Later career ===
He didn't play football again until 1999 when he began turning out for Rottingdean United in the Brighton League. He returned to senior football in 2005–06 to play in the Sussex County League for Whitehawk under Ian Chapman.

In 2007 Whitington and his friends formed a football team called Brighton North End. Whitington played striker for the team that in their first season won the treble: Brighton League Division 2, the JW Whittington Cup and The Hove and Worthing Cup. They were subsequently promoted to the Brighton Premier League. Whitington was also secretary when the club was formed, before leaving sometime in 2008 after scoring 12 goals in 25 games over 2007 and 2008. He joined Three Bridges in 2008.
