= Tony Nicholas =

English footballer

Personal information
- Full name: Anthony Wallace Long Nicholas
- Date of birth: 16 April 1938
- Place of birth: West Ham, England
- Date of death: 25 September 2005 (aged 67)
- Place of death: London, England
- Height: 5 ft 10 in (1.78 m)
- Position: Inside forward

Youth career
- Chelsea

Senior career*
Years	Team	Apps	(Gls)
1956–1960	Chelsea	59	(18)
1960–1962	Brighton & Hove Albion	65	(22)
1962–1965	Chelmsford City		
1965–1966	Leyton Orient	9	(2)
1966–1968	Dartford	59	(35)
1968–1969	Cambridge United		
1969–1972	Dartford	116(7)	(48)
- Portishead
–	Gravesend & Northfleet		
19xx–1973	Folkestone		
1977–197x	Great Baddow		
- * Club domestic league appearances and goals

Anthony Wallace Long Nicholas (16 April 1938 – 25 September 2005) was an English professional footballer who scored 42 goals from 133 appearances in the Football League playing as an inside forward for Chelsea, Brighton & Hove Albion and Leyton Orient. He also played in the Southern League for Chelmsford City, Dartford, Cambridge United, Gravesend & Northfleet and Folkestone.

== Football career ==
After spending time on the club's ground staff, Nicholas turned professional with First Division champions Chelsea in May 1955. He was capped by England at youth level: against a Denmark youth XI in October 1955, he scored three times in a 9–2 victory and, according to The Times' correspondent, "had a rare eye for the target and a left foot of great power". While stationed at RAF High Wycombe during his national service, Nicholas represented the Royal Air Force football team, and helped his station to victory in the RAF Cup Final.

He first played for Chelsea at 18, alongside Peter Brabrook, Ron Tindall, Les Allen and Frank Blunstone in a forward line with an average age of under 20. He played and scored in Chelsea's first appearance in European competition, against a Copenhagen XI in the first round of the 1958–60 Inter-Cities Fairs Cup. Although he scored regularly for Chelsea, he fell out with manager Ted Drake, and joined Brighton & Hove Albion in 1960 for a club record £15,000 fee.

He was Brighton's top scorer in the League in 1960–61, with 13 goals from 27 appearances, and his four goals in the last two games of the season made sure the club avoided relegation. He was Brighton's joint-top scorer, alongside Johnny Goodchild and Bobby Laverick, with 10 goals in all competitions, as the team failed to avoid relegation the following year. In Chris Westcott's book Upfront with Chelsea, Nicholas recalled how his request for a wage increase, when the first-team players were on £20 a week, was turned down, and he went on to leave the Football League, aged just 24, for a wage of £28 a week at Southern League club Chelmsford City.

After a brief return to the Football League with Leyton Orient in the 1965–66 season, Nicholas returned to non-League football with Dartford, Cambridge United, with whom he won a Southern League Premier Division and Cup double in the 1968–69 season, Dartford again, Gravesend & Northfleet and Folkestone. He retired from professional football in 1973, but played for Great Baddow in the Essex Olympian League in the 1977–78 season.

== Personal life ==
Nicholas was born in West Ham, Essex, in 1938. While still playing football, he trained as a cabinet-maker and opened a DIY shop in Chelmsford. This developed into a successful interior design business which he passed on to sons Tony and Kevin. He and wife Darlene were keen golfers.

In later life, Nicholas was treated for leukaemia. He died in a London hospital in September 2005 at the age of 67.
