= Bobby Laverick =

English footballer (born 1938)

Personal information
- Full name: Robert Laverick
- Date of birth: 11 June 1938 (age 88)
- Place of birth: Castle Eden, England
- Height: 5 ft 9 in (1.75 m)
- Positions: Left wing; striker

Youth career
- 1953–1956: Chelsea

Senior career*
Years	Team	Apps	(Gls)
1956–1958	Chelsea	7	(0)
1959–1960	Everton	22	(6)
1960–1962	Brighton & Hove Albion	63	(20)
1962–1963	Coventry City	4	(0)
1963–1964	Corby Town		
1964–1967	King's Lynn		
1967–1968	South Shields		
1968–1970	Ashford Town		
1970	Ramsgate		
1970–1971	Tonbridge		
1971–1972	Ashford Town		
1972–1973	Snowdown Colliery Welfare		
1973–1977	Ashford Town		
1977	Canterbury City		

Managerial career
- 1972–1973: Snowdown Colliery Welfare (player-manager)
- * Club domestic league appearances and goals

Robert Laverick (born 11 June 1938) is an English former professional footballer who scored 26 goals from 96 appearances in the Football League playing on the left wing for Chelsea, Everton, Brighton & Hove Albion and Coventry City.

Laverick was born in Castle Eden, County Durham. He joined Chelsea's youth set–up in 1953 and was part of their 1954–55 South East Counties Youth League winning and FA Youth Cup semi-final teams. In November 1954 he played one match for the England Youth team, scoring against the Netherlands. Laverick played seven matches in the Football League First Division for Chelsea in 1957, but his progress was interrupted by two years National Service in the Royal Army Medical Corps. He failed to establish himself in the Chelsea first team and in February 1959 just prior to the end of his National Service Laverick was signed by First Division club Everton for a sizeable £6,000 transfer fee. He scored on his debut for the 'Toffees' and played eleven of the last thirteen matches of the 1958–59 season scoring five goals. In July 1959 he underwent an emergency appendix operation which delayed his start to the 1959–60 season. After his convalescence he played eleven league matches in the second quarter of the season, scoring one goal – but thereafter didn't play any further league matches for the Everton first team.

In August 1960 Laverick joined Football League Second Division club Brighton with a £7,000 transfer fee being paid by the 'Seagulls'. In the 1961–62 season, in which Brighton were relegated, he was Brighton's joint-top scorer (alongside Johnny Goodchild and Tony Nicholas), with 10 goals in all competitions.

Laverick moved on in the summer of 1962 to Coventry City, then of the Football League Third Division, who paid a £2,500 transfer fee for him. He played only 4 league matches for the 'Sky Blues' and having lost his first team spot requested a transfer. This resulted in March 1962 in his move for a small fee into non-League football with Southern League second tier Division 1 club Corby Town.

After eighteen months with the 'Steelmen', early in the 1964–65 season Laverick was on the move again and in a player exchange deal moved to Southern League Premier Division club King's Lynn. He was now playing as a striker/inside forward rather than as a winger and scored 79 goals from a total of 209 matches for the 'Linnets' (and was top scorer in the 1966–1967 season). In December 1967 he left King's Lynn and returned to his native North East and joined, for a transfer fee, North Regional League club South Shields.

Laverick's next club, which he joined on a free transfer six months later in June 1968, was Southern League second tier Division 1 club Ashford Town who were managed by his one–time Chelsea team-mate Peter Sillett. He was with the 'Nuts and Bolts' for two seasons during each of which he was the clubs leading scorer notching 58 goals in a total of 121 matches. In the latter of the two seasons, 1969–70, Laverick's 22 league goals helped the club secure promotion. On leaving Ashford, for the 1970–71 season he initially signed–on with Southern League Division 1 club Ramsgate but after a couple of months there he moved on to fellow Southern League Division 1 side Tonbridge.

August 1971 saw Laverick return to Ashford in the role of the Reserve Team captain, for whom he now played as a defender in their Kent League campaign. The team were runners–up in the 1972 Kent League Cup and additionally he turned-out several times for Ashford's Southern League Division 1 first team. A year later at the commencement of the 1972–73 season Laverick was appointed player/manager of Snowdown Colliery Welfare who were restarting their Kent League team from scratch. In February 1973 citing difficulties with travelling to training he resigned from the 'Colliers' and took on the coaching role with the Kent League Ashford Town Reserve team – playing once again a few matches in emergency for the Southern League Ashford first team. For the 1977–78 season Laverick took the assistant managers role with Southern League Division 1 South club Canterbury City and additionally, at the age of 39, to alleviate player shortage played for the club.
