= Nicky Bissett =

English footballer

Nicky Bisset
Personal information
- Full name: Nicholas Bissett
- Date of birth: 5 April 1964 (age 62)
- Place of birth: Fulham, England
- Height: 6 ft 2 in (1.88 m)
- Position: Central defender

Senior career*
Years	Team	Apps	(Gls)
- Hornchurch
- Walthamstow Avenue
1987–1988	Dagenham	71	(2)
1988	Barnet	16	(0)
1988–1995	Brighton & Hove Albion	97	(8)
1995	Crawley Town	1	(0)
- Stamco
- * Club domestic league appearances and goals

Nicholas Bissett (born 5 April 1964) is an English former professional footballer who made 97 Football League appearances playing as a central defender for Brighton & Hove Albion.

== Life and career ==
Bissett was born in Fulham, London. He worked as a gas service engineer and played football for Hornchurch and Walthamstow Avenue of the Isthmian League and Conference clubs Dagenham and Barnet, who set a record for a transfer between non-league clubs when they paid £20,000 for his services in March 1988. Six months later, Second Division club Brighton & Hove Albion broke the record for a non-league player when they paid Barnet £115,000 for Bissett. He became a regular in the team over his first 18 months, but he suffered a badly broken leg in a match against Swindon Town that kept him out for nearly a year. He returned in time to help Albion reach the 1991 Second Division play-off final, which they lost to Notts County, but broke the leg again in 1993 and suffered a knee injury the following year which effectively finished his professional career. He made one substitute appearance for Crawley Town, and then tried his luck in minor football with Stamco, but his knee prevented his playing even at that level.

He and his family relocated to York, his wife's home town, and he worked as a postman. As of 2020, their sons George and Harry were playing non-league football in Yorkshire.
