= Johnny Goodchild =

English footballer (1939-2011)

Personal information
- Full name: John Goodchild
- Date of birth: 2 January 1939
- Place of birth: Sherburn Hill, County Durham, England
- Date of death: 25 August 2011 (aged 72)
- Place of death: Durham
- Height: 5 ft 8 in (1.73 m)
- Position: Inside forward

Youth career
- Ludworth Juniors

Senior career*
Years	Team	Apps	(Gls)
1957–1961	Sunderland	44	(21)
1961–1966	Brighton & Hove Albion	163	(44)
1966–1967	York City	29	(6)
1967–1968	Darlington	2	(0)
–	Goole Town		
- * Club domestic league appearances and goals

Johnny Goodchild (2 January 1939 – 25 August 2011) was a professional footballer who scored 71 goals from 238 appearances in the Football League playing as an inside forward for Sunderland, Brighton & Hove Albion, York City and Darlington.

== Career ==
Goodchild was born in Sherburn Hill, County Durham. He worked as a miner and played for Ludworth Juniors before signing for Sunderland. He scored on his first-team debut, on 4 September 1957 in a 3–2 home defeat of Leicester City in the First Division, and produced 16 goals the following season. He then fell out of favour, and, despite scoring a hat-trick away at Leeds United in February 1961, his first game of the 1960–61 season, never appeared for the club again. Goodchild remembers "thinking to myself that if I couldn't get into the team after scoring a hat-trick away from home, I'd be on the transfer list at the end of the season. That's exactly what happened."

He joined Second Division club Brighton & Hove Albion, and in his first season with the club, was their joint-top scorer (alongside Bobby Laverick and Tony Nicholas) with 10 goals in all competitions. Two years later, by which time the club had been twice relegated and were now playing in Division Four, he was top scorer on his own, with 15 goals in all competitions. In 1964–65, Goodchild was one of six goalscorers to reach double figures as Albion won the Fourth Division title.

He returned to the north of England in 1966, spending a season with York City and a brief spell with Darlington.

Goodchild was a keen cricketer. He first played for his village side, in Littletown, at 14, and appeared for Durham Second XI in 1959. He played cricket for many years in the Durham County League for Ushaw Moor CC.
