= Raphael Meade =

English footballer

Personal information
- Full name: Raphael Joseph Meade
- Date of birth: 22 November 1962 (age 63)
- Place of birth: Islington, England
- Height: 5 ft 10 in (1.78 m)
- Position: Striker

Senior career*
Years	Team	Apps	(Gls)
1981–1985	Arsenal	41	(14)
1985–1988	Sporting CP	40	(24)
1988	→ Real Betis (loan)	3	(0)
1988–1989	Dundee United	11	(4)
1989	Luton Town	4	(0)
1989–1991	Odense BK		
1990	→ Ipswich Town (loan)	1	(0)
1991	→ Plymouth Argyle (loan)	5	(0)
1991–1992	Brighton & Hove Albion	40	(9)
1993	Ernest Borel		
1993	Dover Athletic		
1994	Brighton & Hove Albion	3	(0)
1994–1995	Southwick		
1995–1996	Crawley Town	55	(17)
1996–1997	Sittingbourne		
- * Club domestic league appearances and goals

Raphael Joseph Meade (born 22 November 1962) is an English former footballer who played as a striker for clubs in a variety of countries.

== Career ==
Meade was born in Islington, where he attended Tollington Park Secondary School. He played football for Islington Boys, and began his club career at Arsenal as a schoolboy. He turned professional in June 1980, and was prolific for the club's reserve side: with 90 goals from 130 appearances in the Football Combination, he was the leading scorer in both the 1980–81 and 1981–82 seasons. Meade made his first-team debut on 16 September 1981 in a UEFA Cup first round tie away to Panathinaikos; entering the match after 66 minutes with his team 1–0 up, he scored the second goal with a bicycle kick with what the Daily Express reported as his first touch of the ball. On his league debut, in the starting eleven against Manchester City on 17 October, he scored the only goal of the match. Of his sixteen appearances in that season's First Division (eight as substitute), most were made from mid-February 1982 onwards.

He scored twice against Brighton & Hove Albion on his return from a cartilage injury in February 1983, but played only six more matches that season. In December 1983, he scored a winning hat-trick against Watford and his two goals against Tottenham Hotspur in the North London Derby at White Hart Lane helped Arsenal to a 4–2 win, but he failed to score in any of his other 12 appearances. The signings of Paul Mariner and Charlie Nicholas meant Meade had been pushed down the pecking order at Arsenal, and he made only eight appearances in 1984–85, taking his totals to 16 goals from 51 matches in all competitions.

He was sold to Sporting CP in the summer of 1985. In his debut season, Meade scored twice against Athletic Bilbao to help his team reach the quarter-finals of the 1985–86 UEFA Cup, produced hat-tricks against Académica Coimbra and Vitória Guimarães, and finished the campaign with 13 goals from 26 appearances in all competitions. He produced 20 goals from 33 appearances the following season, including 2 in Sporting's 9–0 UEFA Cup defeat of ÍA, and helped Sporting reach the 1987 Taça de Portugal Final, in which they lost to Benfica. He fell out of favour in the third year of his contract with Sporting, and joined Real Betis on loan for the second half of the 1987–88 La Liga season. He made just one start, in a 4–1 win away at Espanyol in early February, and two substitute appearances,

In August 1988 Meade left Sporting CP to sign for Scottish Premier Division club Dundee United for £150,000. He scored seven goals from 22 appearances, which included a winning goal against Floriana that took Dundee United through to the second round of the Cup Winners' Cup, and attracted enough attention for a local fanzine to publish a controversial "supposedly racist" image of him. In March 1989, Meade moved on to Luton Town, for whom he made four appearances and was an unused substitute on the losing side in the 1989 Football League Cup Final.

Meade's next employer was Danish club Odense BK, from where he had brief spells back in England with Ipswich Town and Plymouth Argyle. In August 1991, Meade signed for Brighton & Hove Albion where he became a regular in the side and scored 12 goals from 46 appearances in all competitions. Released at the end of the season, he turned out for the reserve teams of several clubs and spent time with Hong Kong team Ernest Borel before returning to England, first with Dover Athletic and then for a second spell with Brighton & Hove Albion. He then played for Sussex County League club Southwick and for Southern League clubs Crawley Town, where he top-scored in the 1995–96 season, and Sittingbourne.
