= Jock Davie =

Scottish footballer (1913–1994)

Personal information
- Full name: John Davie
- Date of birth: 19 February 1913
- Place of birth: Dunfermline, Scotland
- Date of death: June 1994 (aged 81)
- Place of death: Shrewsbury, England
- Height: 5 ft 9 in (1.75 m)
- Position: Centre forward

Senior career*
Years	Team	Apps	(Gls)
- Dunfermline Wednesday
- St Bernard's
- St Johnstone
- Dunfermline Athletic
1934	Hibernian	3	(0)
1934–1936	Arsenal	0	(0)
1935–1936	→ Margate (loan)		
1936–1946	Brighton & Hove Albion	89	(39)
1946	Stockton		
1946	Barnsley	6	(0)
1946–1947	Kidderminster Harriers		
- Shrewsbury Town
- * Club domestic league appearances and goals

John Davie (19 February 1913 – June 1994) was a Scottish professional footballer who played in the Football League for Brighton & Hove Albion and Barnsley as a centre forward.

== Personal life ==
Davie enlisted in the Police Reserve Force during the Second World War and later served in the British Army as a PT sergeant.

== Honours ==
Margate

- Southern League Eastern Division: 1935–36
- Southern League Central Division: 1935–36
- Kent Senior Cup: 1935–36
- Kent Senior Shield: 1935–36

== Career statistics ==
Appearances and goals by club, season and competition
Club	Season	League			National Cup		Total	
Club	Season	Division	Apps	Goals	Apps	Goals	Apps	Goals
Hibernian	1934–35	Scottish First Division	3	0	0	0	3	0
Career total			3	0	0	0	3	0
