= Anthony James =

Anthony James may refer to:

- Anthony James (artist) (born 1974), English sculptor, painter and performance artist
- Anthony James (actor) (1942–2020), American actor
- Anthony T. James (1922–2006), British chemist
- Anthony James (basketball), see 2010–11 Missouri Valley Conference men's basketball season
- Anthony James (biologist), see List of members of the National Academy of Sciences (animal, nutritional and applied microbial sciences)

== See also ==
- Tony James (disambiguation)
- Antonio James (disambiguation)
- Antony James (born 1989), English swimmer and convicted rapist
