= Stuart Munday =

English footballer

Personal information
- Full name: Stuart Clifford Munday
- Date of birth: 28 September 1972 (age 54)
- Place of birth: Stratford, London, England
- Height: 5 ft 11 in (1.80 m)
- Position: Defender

Youth career
- 1989–1990: Brighton & Hove Albion

Senior career*
Years	Team	Apps	(Gls)
1990–1996	Brighton & Hove Albion	97	(4)
1996–2001	Dover Athletic	135	(5)
2001	Kingstonian	4	(0)
2002–20??	Great Wakering Rovers		
- * Club domestic league appearances and goals

Stuart Clifford Munday (born 28 September 1972) is an English former professional footballer who made 97 Football League appearances playing in defence for Brighton & Hove Albion.

== Life and career ==
Munday was born in Stratford, London, and raised in Shoeburyness, Essex. He played football for Essex Schools and attended Tottenham Hotspur's School Excellence before joining Brighton & Hove Albion as a trainee in 1989. He turned professional the following year, and made his debut in February 1992. He is possibly best remembered for a goal from 30 yards (27 m) in the away leg of a 1994–95 League Cup tie against Premier League club Leicester City that Brighton, then a third-tier team, won 3–0 on aggregate. Playing mainly as a right back, he made 107 appearances in all competitions, but his 1995–96 season was disrupted by a car accident and he was released.

After leaving Brighton, Munday spent five seasons with Dover Athletic, combining semi-professional football with teacher training. He captained the team, and made 135 appearances in the Conference. He signed for Isthmian League club Kingstonian in 2001, but left after a few weeks citing work commitments. In December 2002, he joined Great Wakering Rovers, another Isthmian League club.

Munday has taught at schools including Shoeburyness High School and Palmer's College in Thurrock. He is a committed Christian.
