= Bryan Wade =

English footballer

Personal information
- Full name: Bryan Alexander Wade
- Date of birth: 25 June 1963 (age 63)
- Place of birth: Bath, England
- Height: 1.73 m (5 ft 8 in)
- Position: Centre forward

Senior career*
Years	Team	Apps	(Gls)
- Bath City
- Trowbridge Town
1985–1988	Swindon Town	60	(18)
1988–1990	Swansea City	36	(5)
1990	Haverfordwest		
1990–1991	Brighton & Hove Albion	18	(9)
- Frome Town
- * Club domestic league appearances and goals as of 28 October 2017 (UTC)

Bryan Wade (born 25 June 1963) is an ex-English professional footballer who played as a centre forward for Swindon Town, Swansea City and Brighton & Hove Albion.

During the 1988-89 English football season Wade received a three match ban for violent conduct as a result of elbowing Sheffield United's Chris Wilder in the face.

On 16 January 1991 he made his home debut for Brighton & Hove Albion who won against Newcastle United 4–2, scoring all 4 goals.

== Honours ==
Swindon Town

- Football League Fourth Division: 1985–86

Swansea City

- Welsh Cup: 1988–89
