= Buster Brown (Canadian football) =

James J. "Buster" Brown
Profile
- Position: Tackle

Personal information
- Born: c. 1929
- Died: October 13, 2002 (aged 72–73); Burlington, Ontario, Canada
- Listed height: 6 ft 0 in (1.83 m)
- Listed weight: 210 lb (95 kg)

Career history
- 1951–1953: Hamilton Tiger-Cats

Awards and highlights
- Grey Cup champion (1953)

James Julian "Buster" Brown (c. 1929 – October 13, 2002) was a Canadian professional football player who played for the Hamilton Tiger-Cats. He won the Grey Cup with them in 1953. He previously played football at and attended McGill University.

Brown later served as chairman of the Brown Boggs Foundry and Machine Company in Hamilton. He died in 2002 at his home in Burlington, Ontario.
