= Gary Chivers =

English footballer

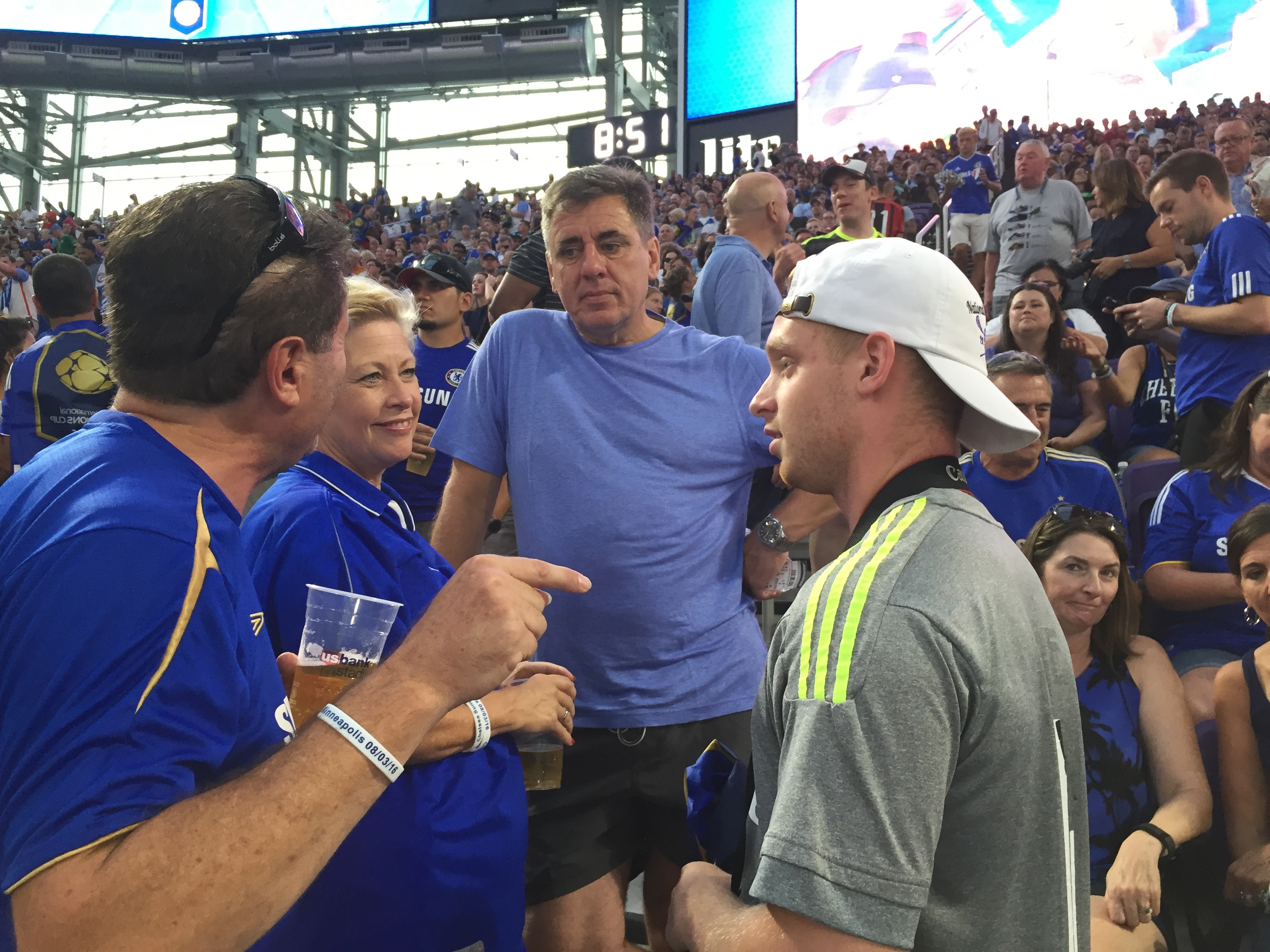
- Chivers in 2016

Personal information
- Date of birth: 15 May 1960 (age 66)
- Place of birth: Stockwell, England
- Height: 5 ft 11 in (1.80 m)
- Position: Defender

Youth career
- Senrab
- Chelsea

Senior career*
Years	Team	Apps	(Gls)
1978–1983	Chelsea	133	(4)
1983–1984	Swansea City	10	(0)
1984–1987	Queens Park Rangers	60	(0)
1987–1988	Watford	14	(0)
1988–1993	Brighton & Hove Albion	217	(14)
1993	Lyn Oslo	4	(0)
1993–1995	AFC Bournemouth	31	(2)
1995–1996	Stamco		
- Worthing
- * Club domestic league appearances and goals

Gary Chivers (born 15 May 1960) is an English former footballer who played as a defender in the Football League for Chelsea, Swansea City, Queens Park Rangers, Watford, Brighton & Hove Albion, AFC Bournemouth, and in the Norwegian Premier League for Lyn Oslo.

A central defender, Chivers began his career with Chelsea in 1979, and remained with the club until 1983, a poor period in the club's history. He then moved to Swansea City, followed by spells with Queens Park Rangers and Watford. He settled at Brighton & Hove Albion, enjoying a six-year stint with the club from 1987. He spent the summer of 1993 playing in Norway with Lyn Oslo before playing out his career at AFC Bournemouth, retiring from professional football in 1995. He played non-league football in Sussex, becoming a chauffeur (with his own stretch-limo) for a living in Surrey before going on to work in the football-related media and in private coaching. He has 6 children.
