= Tommy Cook (sportsman) =

English cricketer and footballer

Personal information
- Full name: Thomas Edwin Reed Cook
- Date of birth: 5 January 1901
- Place of birth: Cuckfield, Sussex, England
- Date of death: 15 January 1950 (aged 49)
- Place of death: Brighton, Sussex, England
- Height: 5 ft 8 in (1.73 m)
- Position: Centre forward

Senior career*
Years	Team	Apps	(Gls)
–1921	Cuckfield Town F.C.		
1921–1930	Brighton & Hove Albion		(114)
1930–1931	Northfleet United		
1931–1933	Bristol Rovers		

International career
1925	England	1	(0)

Managerial career
- 1947–1948: Brighton & Hove Albion
- * Club domestic league appearances and goals

Tommy Cook
Personal information
- Full name: Thomas Edwin Reed Cook
- Born: 5 January 1901; Cuckfield, Sussex, England
- Died: 15 January 1950 (aged 49); Brighton, Sussex, England
- Nickname: Tommy
- Batting: Right-handed
- Bowling: Right-arm medium-pace
- Role: Batsman

Domestic team information
- Years: Team
- 1922–1937: Sussex
- First-class debut: 1 July 1922 Sussex v Leicestershire
- Last First-class: 3 September 1937 Sussex v Surrey

Career statistics
Competition	First-class
Matches	460
Runs scored	20198
Batting average	30.37
100s/50s	32/98
Top score	278
Balls bowled	6530
Wickets	80
Bowling average	36.00
5 wickets in innings	1
10 wickets in match	–
Best bowling	5/24
Catches/stumpings	169/1
- Source: CricketArchive, 5 May 2014

Thomas Edwin Reed Cook (5 January 1901 – 15 January 1950) was an English sportsman. He played professional football, playing as a centre-forward and additionally had a substantial career in First-Class cricket primarily as a batsman.

== Football career ==
Cook commenced his football career with his home-town club Cuckfield Town. In 1921 he signed as an amateur with Football League Third Division South club Brighton & Hove Albion and turned professional in 1923 and remained with Brighton & Hove until 1930. Cook remains Brighton's all-time top scorer, with 123 goals from 209 games played. In 1930 he moved on to Kent League club Northfleet United remaining for one season. Thereafter he moved on in 1931 for two seasons with Football League Third Division South Bristol Rovers after which, aged 32, he retired from football and focused on his cricket career.

In February 1925 Cook became Brighton's first player to play for England after he made one appearance for England in a British Home Championship match against Wales.

In June 1947 Cook returned to Brighton & Hove Albion as team manager but after a few difficult months in which the team won only 3 from 17 matches he lost his job.

== Cricket career ==
Primarily a right-handed batsman and also an occasional right-arm medium pace bowler he was recruited to Sussex County Cricket Club after being spotted playing for Cuckfield's second X1. Cook played 460 first-class games over a 15 year career for Sussex. He scored 20,198 runs with 32 centuries and a highest score of 278 runs. As a bowler he took 60 wickets with one 5 wicket innings. He was prolific in the seasons of 1933 and 1934 when Sussex were County Championship runners-up.

== Non-sporting life ==
Born in Cuckfield, Sussex Cook married twice. Firstly in 1925, then after divorce in April 1931 he remarried later that same year.

Cook served in both world wars. In World War I he enlisted into the Royal Navy when only 16 years old and while serving in Russia he won a medal after diving into the freezing sea to save a shipmate's life. In World War 2 he signed-up to the Royal Air Force and in 1943, when attached to the South African Air Force, was involved in an air training crash in which he suffered physical and mental injuries and was hospitalised for six months.

He died by taking his own life in 1950, overdosing on sleeping pills, ten days after his 49th birthday.

In 2021 a book of his life and his highly successful careers with Brighton & Hove Albion and Sussex County Cricket Club entitled Tommy Cook, The Double Life of a Superstar Sportsman was published
