= Ken Bennett (English footballer) =

English footballer

Personal information
- Full name: Kenneth Edgar Bennett
- Date of birth: 2 October 1921
- Place of birth: Wood Green, London, England
- Date of death: December 1994 (aged 73)
- Place of death: Rochford, England
- Positions: Inside forward; centre forward

Senior career*
Years	Team	Apps	(Gls)
- Wood Green Town
1940–1946	Tottenham Hotspur	0	(0)
1946–1948	Southend United	50	(10)
1948–1949	Bournemouth & Boscombe Athletic	19	(1)
1949–1950	Guildford City		
1950–1953	Brighton & Hove Albion	101	(37)
1953–1954	Crystal Palace	17	(2)
1954	Headington United	4	(0)
- * Club domestic league appearances and goals

Kenneth Edgar Bennett (2 October 1921 – December 1994) was an English professional footballer who scored 50 goals from 187 appearances in the Football League playing for Southend United, Bournemouth & Boscombe Athletic, Brighton & Hove Albion and Crystal Palace.

== Career ==
Bennett was born in Wood Green, north London, and began his football career before the Second World War with local club Wood Green Town. He joined Tottenham Hotspur during the war, and played for the club occasionally in the wartime competitions, but when the Football League resumed in 1946 he signed for Southend United. After two seasons he moved on to Bournemouth & Boscombe Athletic, a year later joining Southern League club Guildford City, and then, after another year, returning to the League with Brighton & Hove Albion. He was the club's top scorer in both the 1951–52 and 1952–53 seasons, with 19 and 13 goals respectively in all competitions, and then spent a year with Crystal Palace. In 1954 he returned to the Southern League, playing four games for Headington United. Bennett died in Rochford, Essex, in 1994 at the age of 73.
