= Albert Mundy =

English footballer

- Mundy in 1958

Personal information
- Full name: Albert Edward Mundy
- Date of birth: 12 May 1926
- Place of birth: Gosport, England
- Date of death: 11 December 1999 (aged 73)
- Place of death: Portsmouth, England
- Height: 5 ft 8 in (1.73 m)
- Positions: Inside forward; centre forward

Senior career*
Years	Team	Apps	(Gls)
–	Gosport Borough		
1950–1953	Portsmouth	51	(12)
1953–1958	Brighton & Hove Albion	165	(87)
1958–1960	Aldershot	130	(12)
–	Guildford City		
–	Gosport Borough		
- * Club domestic league appearances and goals

Albert Edward Mundy (12 May 1926 – 11 December 1999) was a professional footballer who scored 111 goals from 346 appearances in the Football League playing for Portsmouth, Brighton & Hove Albion and Aldershot.

== Life and career ==
Mundy was born in Gosport, Hampshire, in 1926, and played for hometown club Gosport Borough before moving into the Football League with Portsmouth. He made his debut in March 1951, in a goalless draw at home to Manchester United in the First Division, but failed to establish himself as a first-team regular, and joined Brighton & Hove Albion in 1953. Playing at inside or centre forward, he was Brighton's top scorer for three consecutive seasons, from 1954–55 to 1956–57. Playing for Aldershot against Hartlepools United in 1958, Mundy scored a goal after only six seconds, which was at the time the fastest goal ever recorded. After finishing his Football League career, Mundy played in the Southern League for Guildford City before returning to Gosport Borough. On 11 December 1999, Mundy died at the age of 73 in Portsmouth.
