= Tony James (Welsh footballer, born 1919) =

Welsh footballer

Personal information
- Full name: Thomas Albert George James
- Date of birth: 16 September 1919
- Place of birth: Ynysybwl, Wales
- Date of death: 1981 (aged 61)
- Height: 5 ft 8 in (1.73 m)
- Position: Inside forward

Senior career*
Years	Team	Apps	(Gls)
–	Folkestone Town		
1939–1949	Brighton & Hove Albion	69	(20)
1949–1951	Bristol Rovers	21	(5)
1951–195?	Bath City		
- * Club domestic league appearances and goals

Thomas Albert George "Tony" James (16 September 1919 – 1981) was a Welsh professional footballer who scored 25 goals from 90 appearances in the English Football League playing for Brighton & Hove Albion and Bristol Rovers. He was Brighton's top scorer in the 1947–48 season with 14 goals in all competitions. He went on to play 41 times for Southern League club Bath City. James was born in Ynysybwl, Glamorgan, and played as an inside forward.
