= Robert Codner =

English footballer

Personal information
- Full name: Robert Andrew George Codner
- Date of birth: 23 January 1965 (age 61)
- Place of birth: Walthamstow, England
- Height: 5 ft 11 in (1.80 m)
- Positions: Midfielder; forward

Senior career*
Years	Team	Apps	(Gls)
1983–1984	Leicester City	?	(?)
1984–1986	Dagenham	?	(?)
1986–1988	Barnet	?	(?)
1988–1995	Brighton & Hove Albion	266	(39)
1995	Reading	4	(0)
1996	Peterborough United	2	(0)
1996–1997	Barnet	32	(1)
1997	Southend United	4	(0)
1997	Ilkeston Town	?	(?)
1997–199?	Stevenage Borough	4	(0)
1999	Aylesbury United	4	(0)
1999–2000	Farnborough Town	22	(1)
2000–2001	Cardiff City	0	(0)
2001	Kettering Town	?	(?)
2001	Dover Athletic	?	(?)
2001	Chesham United	?	(?)
2001–2002	Chertsey Town	?	(?)
2002–200?	Banstead Athletic	?	(?)

International career
- England semi-professional
- * Club domestic league appearances and goals as of 18:17, 12 April 2009 (UTC)

Robert Andrew George Codner (born 23 January 1965) is an English retired professional footballer.

== Football career ==
=== Playing career ===
He played as a midfielder and forward for Leicester City, Dagenham, Barnet, Brighton & Hove Albion, Reading, Peterborough United, Southend United, Stevenage Borough, Aylesbury United, Farnborough Town, Cardiff City, Kettering Town, Dover Athletic, Chesham United, Chertsey Town and Banstead Athletic. He made over 300 appearances in The Football League scoring 40 goals. Codner also represented England semi-professional football team.

=== Non-playing career ===
He has since gone on to become a football agent.
