= Oliver Brown (footballer) =

English footballer

Personal information
- Full name: Oliver Maurice Brown
- Date of birth: 10 October 1908
- Place of birth: Burton upon Trent, England
- Date of death: 1953 (aged 44–45)
- Place of death: London, England
- Height: 5 ft 10 in (1.78 m)
- Position: Centre forward

Senior career*
Years	Team	Apps	(Gls)
–	Trent Villa		
–	Robirth Athletic		
–	Burton Town		
1930–1931	Nottingham Forest	9	(6)
1931–1933	Norwich City	51	(33)
1933–1937	Brighton & Hove Albion	58	(38)
- * Club domestic league appearances and goals

Oliver Maurice Brown (10 October 1908 – 1953), also known as Buster Brown, was an English professional footballer who scored 77 goals from 118 appearances in the Football League playing as a centre forward for Nottingham Forest, Norwich City and Brighton & Hove Albion. He was Brighton's top scorer in the 1933–34 and 1934–35 seasons with, respectively, 15 and 26 goals in all competitions.

Brown was born in Burton upon Trent, Staffordshire, and died in London. His younger brother Ambrose was also a professional footballer who played League football for Chesterfield, Portsmouth and Wrexham.
