= Kit Napier =

Scottish footballer (1943–2019)

Personal information
- Full name: Christopher Robin Anthony Napier
- Date of birth: 26 September 1943
- Place of birth: Dunblane, Scotland
- Date of death: 31 March 2019 (aged 75)
- Place of death: Durban, South Africa
- Height: 5 ft 11 in (1.80 m)
- Position: Forward

Youth career
- Blackpool

Senior career*
Years	Team	Apps	(Gls)
1960–1963	Blackpool	2	(0)
1963–1964	Preston North End	1	(0)
1964–1965	Workington	58	(25)
1965–1966	Newcastle United	8	(0)
1966–1972	Brighton & Hove Albion	256	(84)
1972–1974	Blackburn Rovers	54	(10)
- Durban United
Total		379	(119)
- * Club domestic league appearances and goals

Christopher Robin Anthony Napier (26 September 1943 – 31 March 2019) was a Scottish professional footballer who scored 119 goals from 379 appearances in the Football League playing as a forward for Blackpool, Preston North End, Workington, Newcastle United, Brighton & Hove Albion and Blackburn Rovers.

== Career ==
Napier was born in Dunblane and raised in West Linton, which was then in Peeblesshire. He was a nephew of Celtic player Tommy McInally. He played youth football with Linton Hotspur before joining Blackpool's ground staff straight from school and turning professional in 1960. He played twice in the Football League before joining their arch-rivals, Preston North End, for the 1963–64 season. After a single appearance in the Second Division, and still only 20 years old, he moved on to his third club, Workington, newly promoted to the Third Division. He scored twice as Workington eliminated First Division Blackburn Rovers from the 1964–65 League Cup by five goals to one, and scored the equaliser as his club earned a deserved replay against eventual winners Chelsea in the quarter-final.

Such results, added to 25 goals from 58 League matches, attracted attention. In November 1965, First Division club Newcastle United paid £18,000 for Napier's services, but at the end of the season, having struggled to adapt to the higher level, he returned to Division Three with Brighton & Hove Albion, for an £8,500 fee. At Brighton he finally found some stability; of the six seasons he spent with the club, he was their top scorer in all but 1969–70, and helped them to runners-up spot in 1972. Though his club were promoted, Napier spent two further seasons in Division Three, with Blackburn Rovers. He then moved to South Africa, where he played for Durban United and then made a career in the motor trade.

He died in Durban, South Africa, at the age of 75.
