= Mark Gall =

English footballer (born 1963)

Personal information
- Full name: Mark Ian Gall
- Date of birth: 14 May 1963 (age 63)
- Place of birth: Brixton, England
- Height: 5 ft 10 in (1.78 m)
- Position: Striker

Senior career*
| Years | Team | Apps | (Gls) |
| 198?–1988 | Greenwich Borough | | |
| 1988–1991 | Maidstone United | 133 | (71) |
| 1991–1992 | Brighton & Hove Albion | 31 | (13) |
- * Club domestic league appearances and goals

Mark Ian Gall (born 14 May 1963) is an English former professional footballer who scored 44 goals from 116 appearances in the Football League playing as a forward for Maidstone United and Brighton & Hove Albion.

Gall came to prominence as a goalscorer with Greenwich Borough in the Kent League before the manager of Maidstone United, then a Conference club, took a chance on him. Gall reproduced his scoring form at the higher level, helping the club to promotion into the Football League and coming close to a second consecutive promotion. A move to the Second Division with Brighton & Hove Albion brought him another 14 goals and the club's Player of the Year award before a knee injury put an end to his professional career after only three seasons.

== Career ==
Gall was born in Brixton, south London. A prolific scorer for Greenwich Borough in the Kent League, playing part-time while employed in his father's bakery, he was watched by representatives of several Football League clubs. Loss of form – attributed by the player himself to an inability to concentrate because "so many clubs were watching me was on my mind a lot" – caused him to lose his place. He signed for Conference club Maidstone United in February 1988 for a £2,000 fee. Maidstone manager John Still was nevertheless surprised that no League club had been prepared to risk such a small sum on a player of potential, albeit one playing at an "fairly low" level.

Gall scored 14 goals from as many games for Maidstone in what remained of the 1987–88 season, and added another four in the opening two games of the next. In October 1988, the player turned down the opportunity to go on loan to Second Division club Brighton & Hove Albion; Brighton were interested in taking the player on a permanent deal, but the price-tag of £125,000 was too steep for them. By mid-December, Gall and his strike partner, former Brentford player Steve Butler, had 43 goals between them for the season, and were being described as "the most effective goalscoring partnership in non-League football", Gall's "exceptional pace and powerful shooting" complementing the "elegant and elusive" Butler. Still suggested that Gall's improvement since his arrival at Maidstone had been such that, with the benefit of full-time training, he could become an "exceptional player". An arrangement was made in January 1989 for him to train two days a week with Second Division club Crystal Palace.

Butler and Gall contributed 26 goals apiece as Maidstone won the 1989 Conference title, thus earning promotion to the Fourth Division of the Football League. Gall and his club made their Football League debuts on 19 August 1989, as Maidstone lost 1–0 away at Peterborough United. His first League goals came on 16 September, scoring twice in a 3–2 defeat of Grimsby Town. Gall and Butler's partnership continued into the Football League. By the end of the regular season, they had scored 39 League goals between them to help the club to fifth position and a place in the semi-final of the first ever Fourth Division play-offs. Playing Cambridge United away from home, Maidstone fell a goal behind, but in the 90th minute of the match, Gall scored an equaliser: a long throw was headed against his own crossbar by Cambridge striker Dion Dublin, helping out in defence, and the rebound fell for Gall seven yards out. In the home leg, with the game goalless and "heading for injury time, Gall found himself clean through but could only put the ball wide". In the play-offs, the away goals rule applied only after extra time, and Cambridge scored twice in the extra 30-minute period to progress to the final.

He scored 31 goals for the club from 85 League games before signing for Brighton & Hove Albion for a £45,000 fee in October 1991, as a replacement for John Byrne, who had just transferred to Sunderland for £225,000. Despite only joining the club two months into the season, the "ever-willing and speedy" Gall finished as Brighton's top scorer, with 14 goals in all competitions (13 in the League). He "quickly became a crowd favourite in a struggling side", and was chosen as the club's Player of the Season. He never played professional football again. After two operations on his left knee, Gall retired on specialist medical advice in December 1992 and resumed working in the family bakery.
