= Perry Digweed =

English professional footballer (born 1959)

Personal information
- Full name: Perry Michael Digweed
- Date of birth: 26 October 1959 (age 67)
- Place of birth: Westminster, England
- Height: 6 ft 0 in (1.83 m)
- Position: Goalkeeper

Senior career*
Years	Team	Apps	(Gls)
1976–1981	Fulham	15	(0)
1981–1993	Brighton & Hove Albion	179	(0)
1987–1988	→ Chelsea (loan)	3	(0)
1993	Wimbledon	0	(0)
1993–1995	Watford	29	(0)
Total		226	(0)
- * Club domestic league appearances and goals

Perry Digweed (born 26 October 1959) is an English former professional footballer who played as a goalkeeper for Fulham, Brighton & Hove Albion, Chelsea, Wimbledon and Watford, making 226 appearances in the Football League.

After retiring from football, Digweed went on to appear alongside Vinnie Jones in the film Mean Machine.
