= Ian Chapman (footballer) =

English footballer

Personal information
- Full name: Ian Russell Chapman
- Date of birth: 31 May 1970 (age 56)
- Place of birth: Brighton, England
- Position: Defender

Youth career
- 1981-1984: Whitehawk

Senior career*
Years	Team	Apps	(Gls)
1987–1996	Brighton & Hove Albion	281	(14)
1996–1997	Gillingham	23	(1)
2001-2007	Whitehawk	44+	(1)

International career
1985	England U16	4	(1)

Managerial career
- 2001–2007: Whitehawk
- 2012–2018: Burgess Hill Town
- * Club domestic league appearances and goals

Ian Russell Chapman (born 31 May 1970) is an English former professional footballer. Born in Brighton, he spent most of his career with hometown club Brighton & Hove Albion.

== Playing career ==
Chapman played youth football at Whitehawk for three years before joining the Football Association's School of Excellence at Lilleshall Hall as a 14-year-old. When he made his professional debut for Brighton & Hove Albion away to Birmingham City in February 1987, he became the first former Lilleshall Hall pupil to play in the Football League, in addition to being Brighton's youngest ever peacetime player. He went on to make 281 Football League appearances for the "Seagulls". He was part of the team which made the final of the Second Division play-offs in 1991, but during his time at the Goldstone Ground Brighton also twice suffered relegation, and dropped into the Football League Third Division in 1996. Immediately after Brighton's relegation, he was transferred to Gillingham, who had just gained promotion from the Third Division. He only made 23 League appearances for the Gills, before he was forced to retire from professional football due to injuries. In 1999 he made one last bid to return to professional football when he played in a number of reserve games with his former club Brighton & Hove Albion, but his injury problems prevented him gaining a contract.

== Managerial career ==
Chapman became player-manager of Whitehawk in the Sussex County League at the start of the 2001–02 season, initially sharing managerial duties with Glenn Burvill for a year. The Hawks were runners-up in the Sussex County League in his first season in joint charge, and again in 2007. In October 2006 he had returned to former club Brighton & Hove Albion in a coaching role, initially in a part-time capacity while remaining manager of Whitehawk. At the end of the 2006–07 season he dedicated himself to the job at Brighton & Hove Albion full-time, resigning from his job with Whitehawk. He left his job at Brighton & Hove Albion in 2008, however, after the departure of Dean Wilkins, the manager who had brought him to the club. He was said to be in the running to take over as manager of Isthmian League team Crowborough Athletic, but was not offered the job.

He later coached Conference National strugglers Lewes on a casual basis while looking for another full-time job in the sport. In 2012, he joined Isthmian League side Burgess Hill Town as manager, winning promotion to the Isthmian Premier Division in 2015. He parted company with Burgess Hill Town in October 2018.

== Management Honours ==
Burgess Hill Town

- Isthmian League Division One South champions: 2014-15
