= List of Brentford F.C. players (1–24 appearances) =

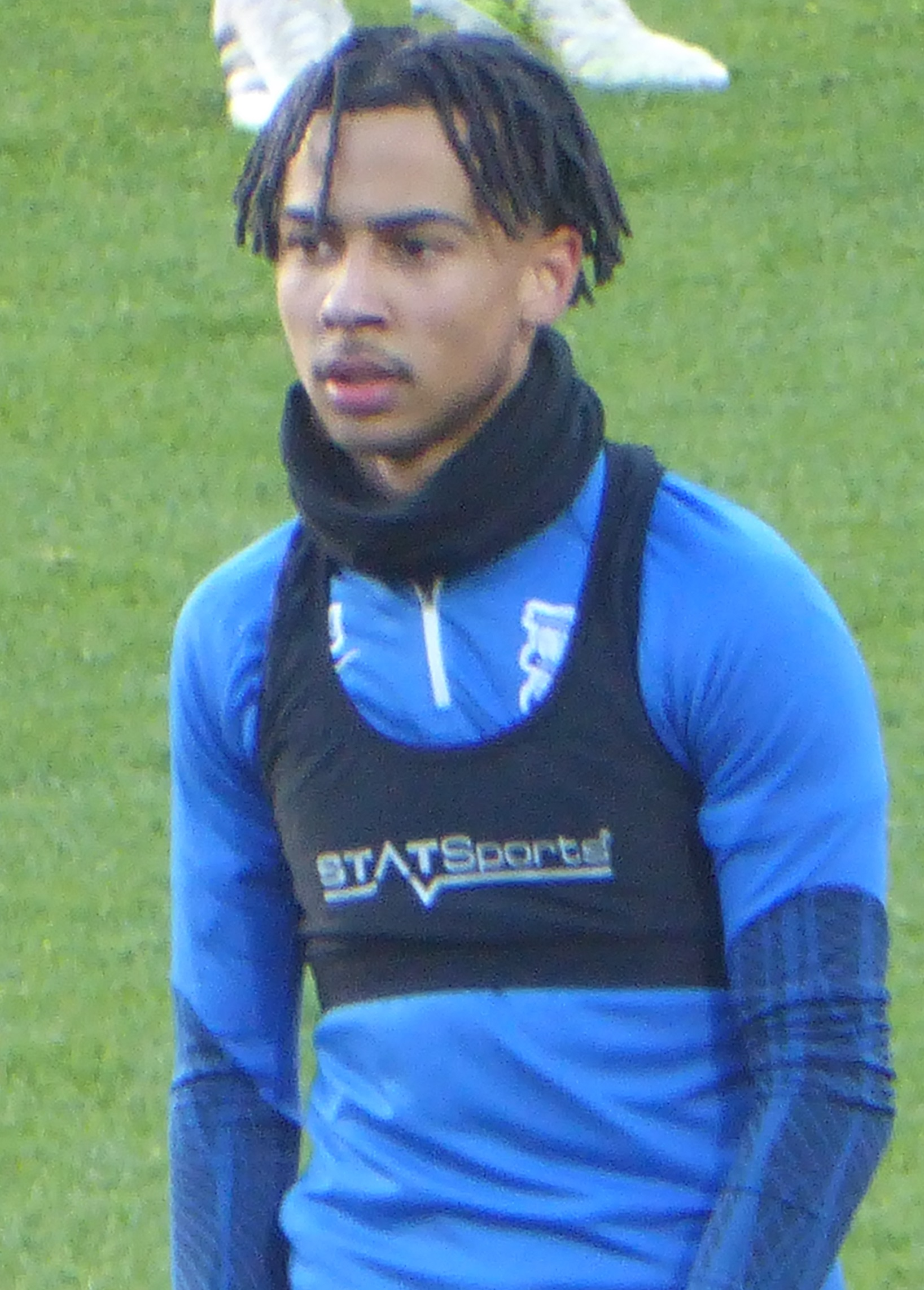
Current first team attacking midfielder Romelle Donovan has made between 1 and 24 appearances for Brentford.

Brentford Football Club is an English professional football club based in Brentford, Hounslow, London. Between 1897 and 1920, the first team competed in the London League, Southern League and Western League. Since 1920, the first team has competed in the Football League, the Premier League and other nationally and internationally organised competitions. All players who have played between 1 and 24 such matches are listed below.

== Records and notable players ==
Players who finished their Brentford careers with 24 appearances are Micky Cook, Joe Craddock, Ryan Denys, Micky Droy, Brian Etheridge, Tommy Finney, Scott Fitzgerald, John Halls, Tommy Leigh, Roddy McLeod, Sammy Moore, Sidney Mulford, Mark Peters and Harry Stott. Roddy McLeod scored 14 goals in his 24 appearances and is the highest scorer on this list.

Campbell (1895), John Cairns, Herbert Farnfield, C. W. Fox, Bernard Kelly, James Lockwood, J. McMillan, Thomas Meehan, Montell Moore, William Price, Jerrome Sobers and Bobby Wilson finished their Brentford careers having scored on their only appearance for the club. C. Ward scored 9 goals in six appearances and Richard Sloley scored seven goals in six appearances. 'A. Newman' (an alias) scored two goals on his sole appearance in 1898 and L. Ingram scored two goals in his two appearances.

Current Brentford players who have made between 1 and 24 appearances are Jaidon Anthony, Benjamin Arthur, Ellery Balcombe, Luka Bentt, El Hadji Malick Diouf, Romelle Donovan, Kaye Furo, Kim Ji-soo, Yunus Emre Konak, Jayden Meghoma, Antoni Milambo, Gustavo Nunes, Michael Olakigbe, Mamadou Sangaré, Jannik Schuster, Hákon Valdimarsson and Callum Wilson.

== Key ==
- Appearance and goal totals include matches in the Premier League, Football League, Southern League, London League (1896–1898) FA Cup, League Cup, Football League Trophy, Anglo-Italian Cup, London Challenge Cup, Middlesex Senior Cup, London Junior Cup, Middlesex Junior Cup, West Middlesex Cup, Southern Floodlit Challenge Cup, Football League Jubilee Fund and Empire Exhibition Cup. Substitute appearances are included. Wartime matches are regarded as unofficial and are excluded.
- "Brentford career" corresponds to the years in which the player made their first and last appearances.
- Players listed in **bold** won full international caps whilst with the club.
- Statistics are correct as of match played 18 September 2026.
- Starting lineups are untraced prior to the beginning of the 1893–94 season.

=== Playing positions ===
GK	Goalkeeper	RB	Right back	RW	Right winger	DF	Defender	HB	Half back	IF	Inside forward	DM	Defensive midfielder
OL	Outside left	LB	Left back	LW	Left winger	CB	Centre back	FW	Forward	FB	Full back	RM	Right midfielder
W	Winger	MF	Midfielder	ST	Striker	WH	Wing half	AM	Attacking midfielder	CM	Central midfielder	LM	Left midfielder
U	Utility player	OR	Outside right	SW	Sweeper	LH	Left half	RH	Right half				

Symbol	Meaning
‡	Brentford player in the 2026–27 season.
*	Player has left Brentford but is still playing in a professional league.
♦	Player went on to manage the club.
(c)	Player captained the club.

== Players ==
Forward Henry White scored 9 goals in 18 appearances before embarking on a Football League career in 1919.

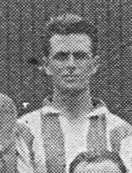
Joe Craddock supported the attack with 11 goals in 24 appearances between 1926 and 1928.

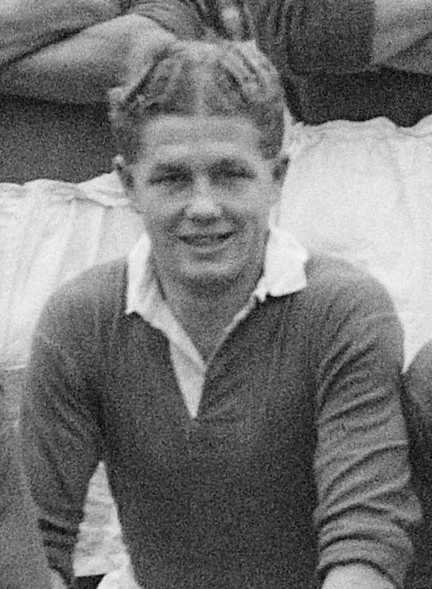
Scottish forward Jimmy Bowie played for three of the four West London clubs, but made just 9 appearances while at Brentford in 1952.

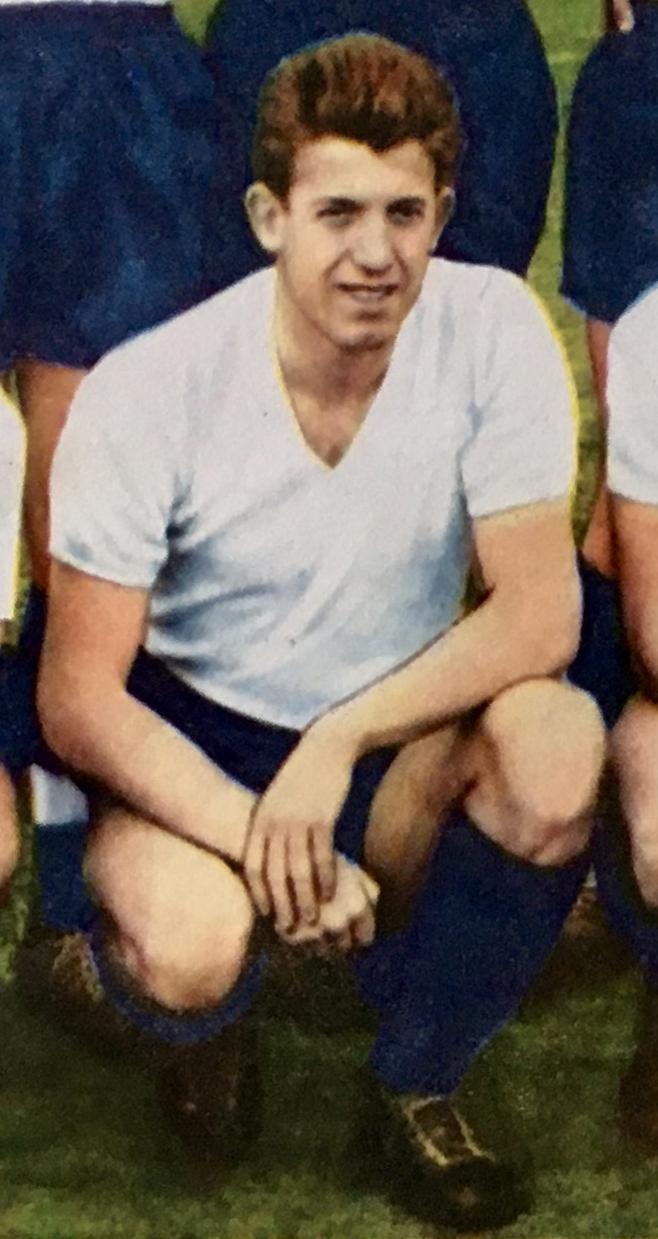
Future England international inside forward Peter Broadbent departed for a £10,000 fee in February 1951, which was then the English record transfer fee for a teenager.

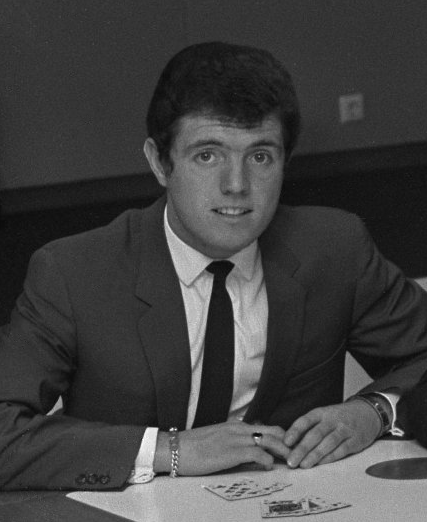
Former Arsenal and Tottenham Hotspur forward David Jenkins scored one goal in 18 appearances during the 1972–73 season.

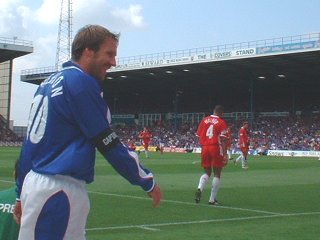
Arsenal reserve winger Paul Merson joined on loan in 1987. He went on to win 21 caps for England between 1991 and 1998.

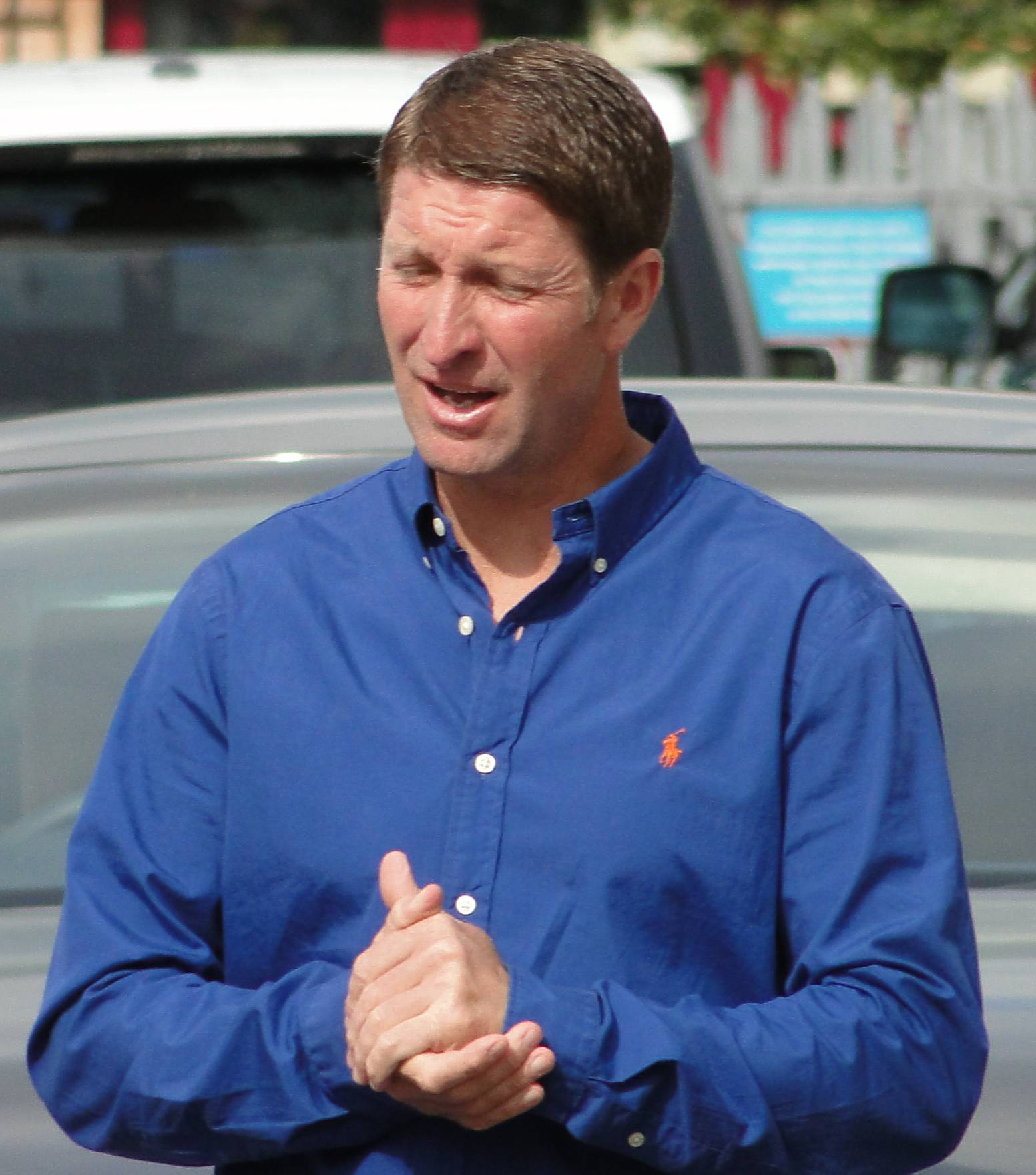
Future West Ham United cult hero John Moncur made six appearances on loan from Tottenham Hotspur in 1989.

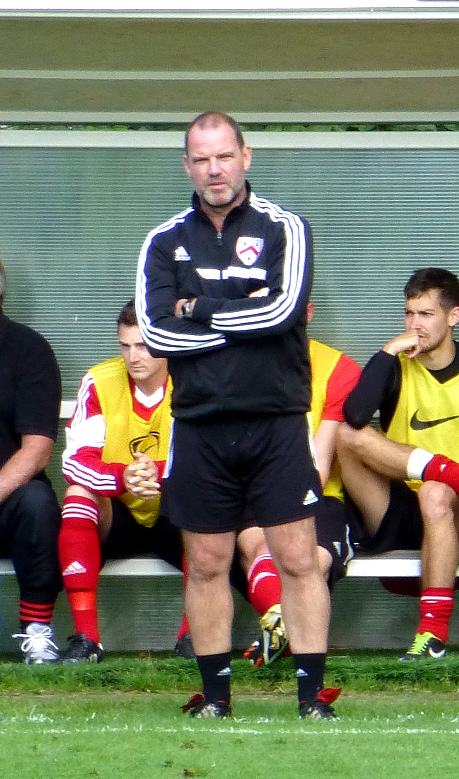
Left winger Jon Purdie signed on a one-month trial towards the end of the 1988–89 season. Brentford won five of the six games in which he played.

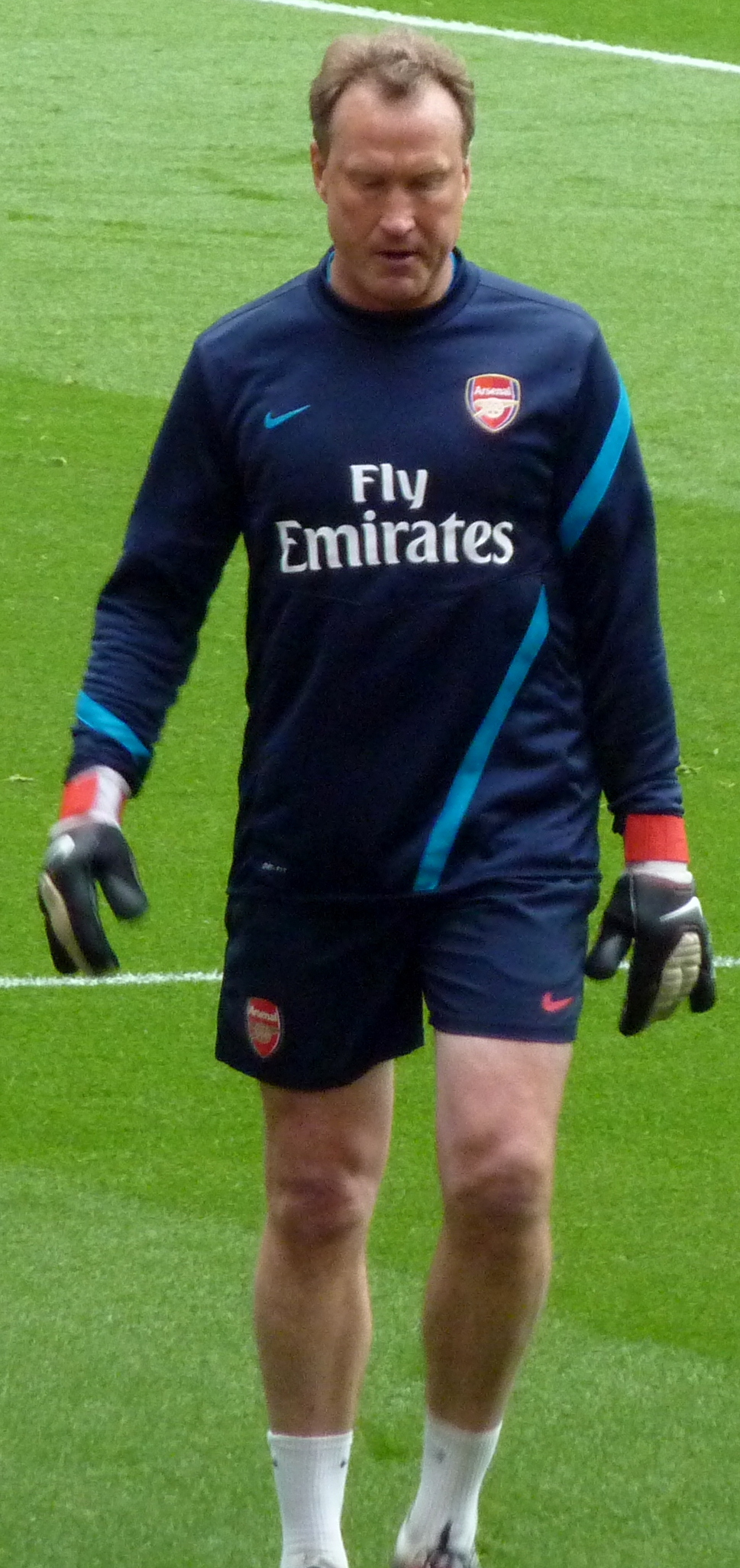
Former Republic of Ireland international goalkeeper Gerry Peyton made 22 appearances in two spells during the 1992–93 season.

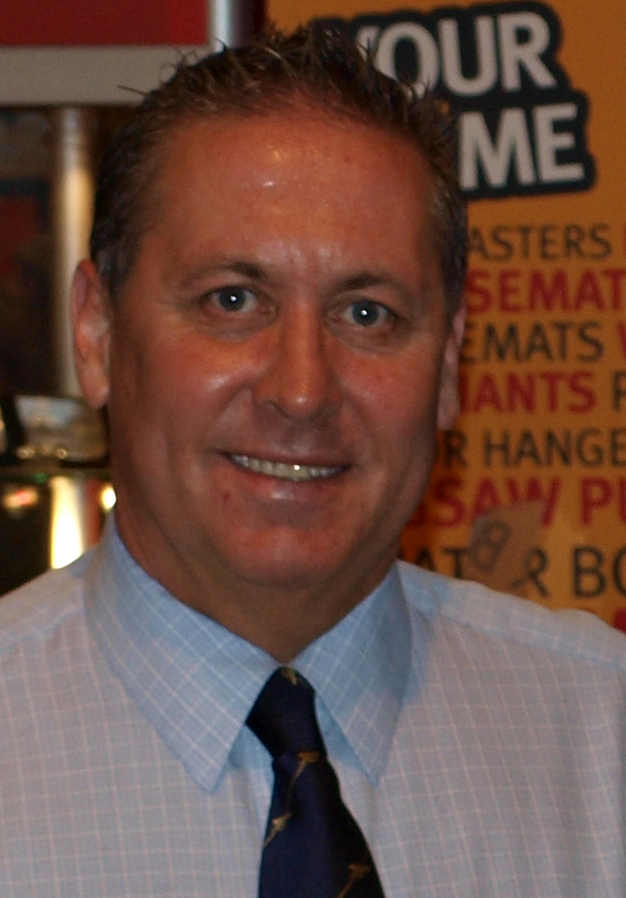
Former England international left back Kenny Sansom was signed in March 1993 in a bid to shore up the defence, but Brentford succumbed to relegation from First Division.

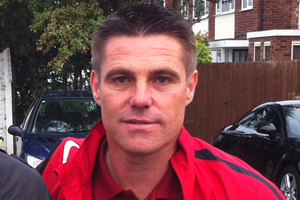
Southend United winger Steve Tilson made two appearances on loan in 1993. He later managed the Shrimpers to successive promotions from League Two to the Championship in the mid-2000s.

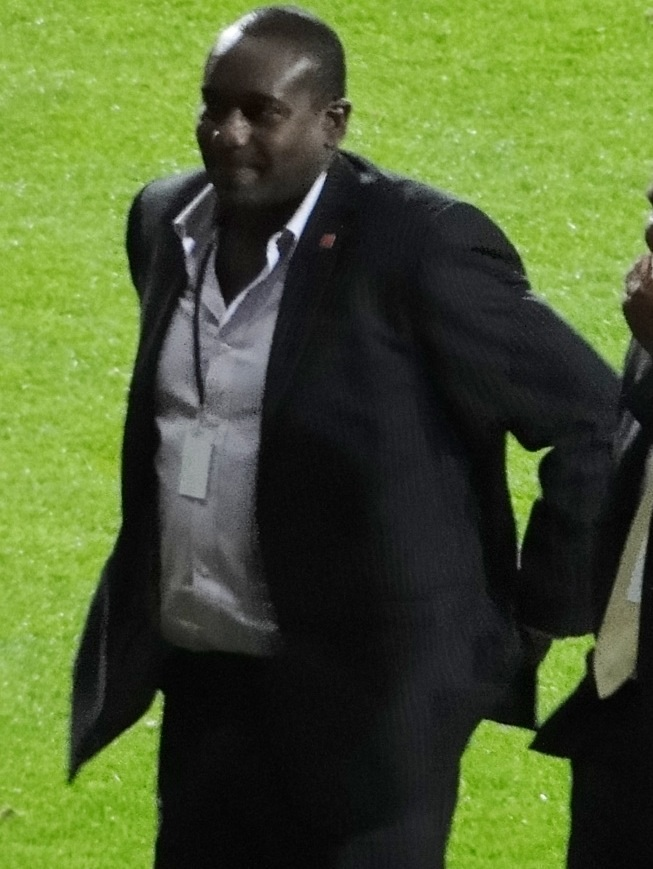
Birmingham City midfielder George Parris spent the first month of the 1994–95 season at Griffin Park. He made 300 appearances for West Ham United earlier in his career.

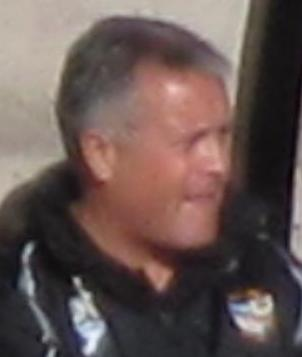
Then-manager Micky Adams made a substitute cameo in a Football League Trophy second round defeat to Luton Town in January 1998.

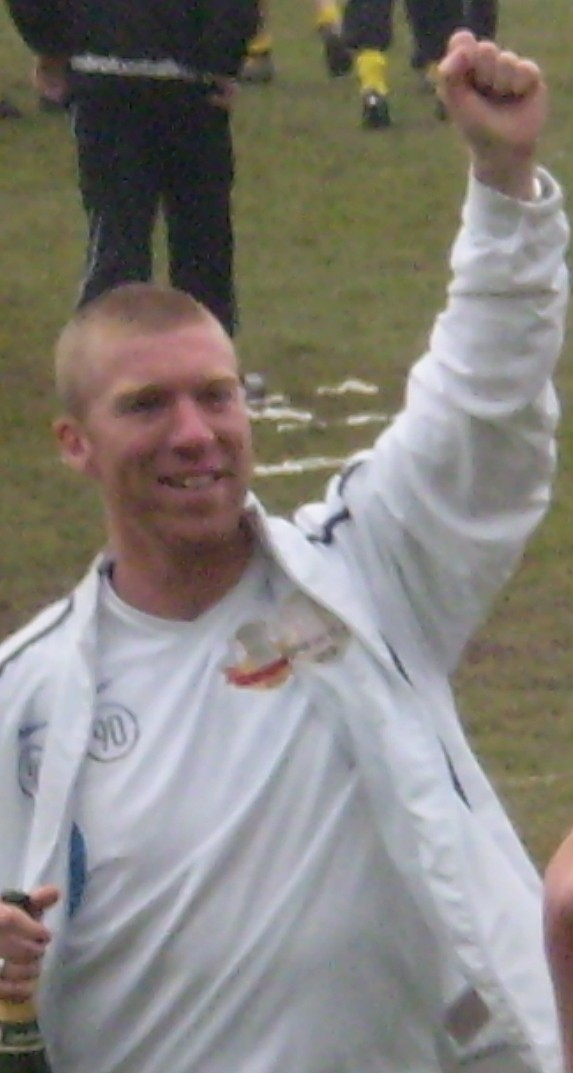
One of many former Tottenham Hotspur reserve players to join in 1997, midfielder Simon Wormull made eight appearances before dropping into non-league football.

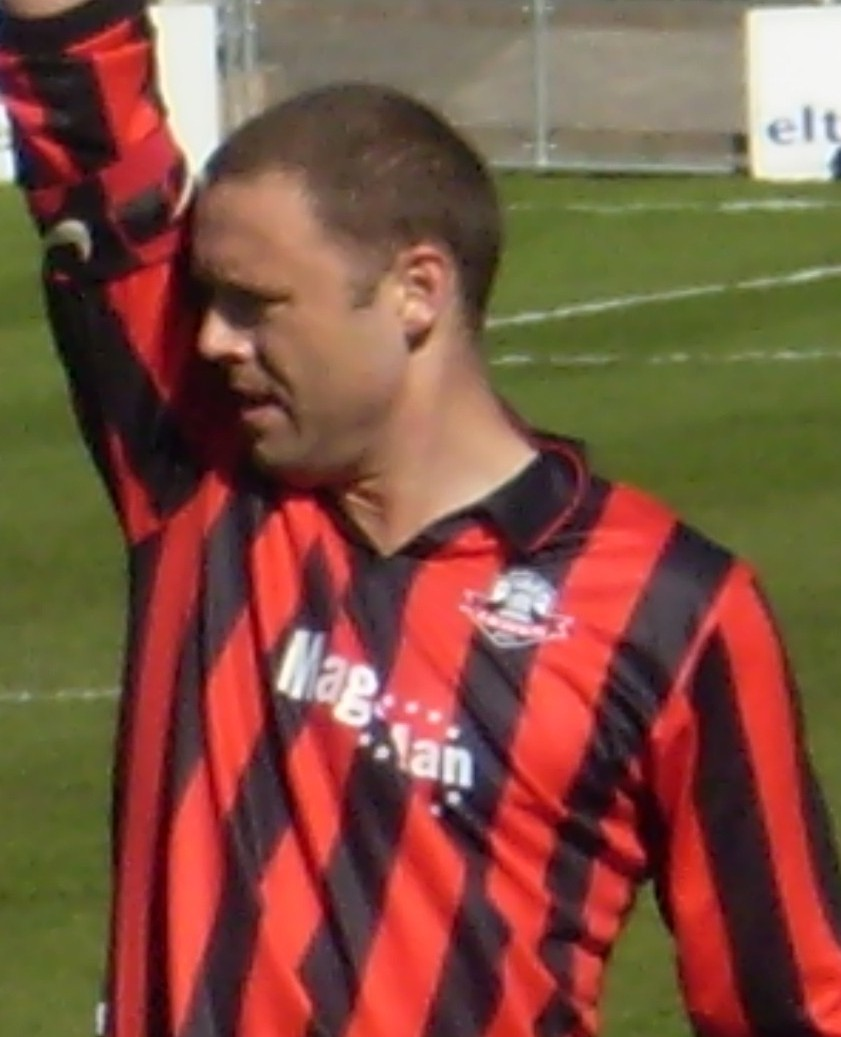
Tough-tackling centre back Danny Cullip's Griffin Park career was halted on 17 appearances, after suffering a serious knee injury in August 1998.

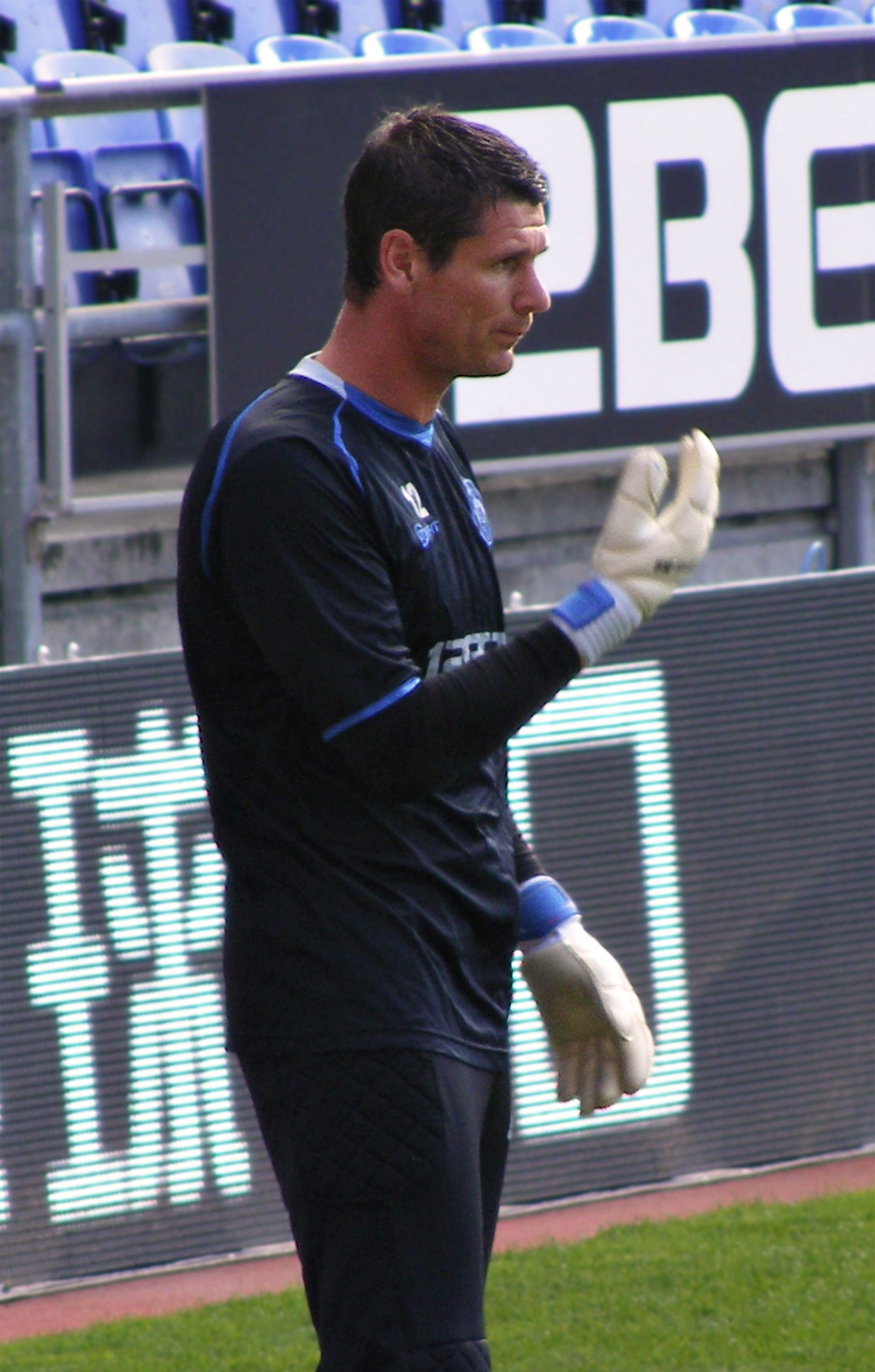
Goalkeeper Mike Pollitt made five appearances on loan from Notts County in 1998. He later played in the Premier League for Wigan Athletic.

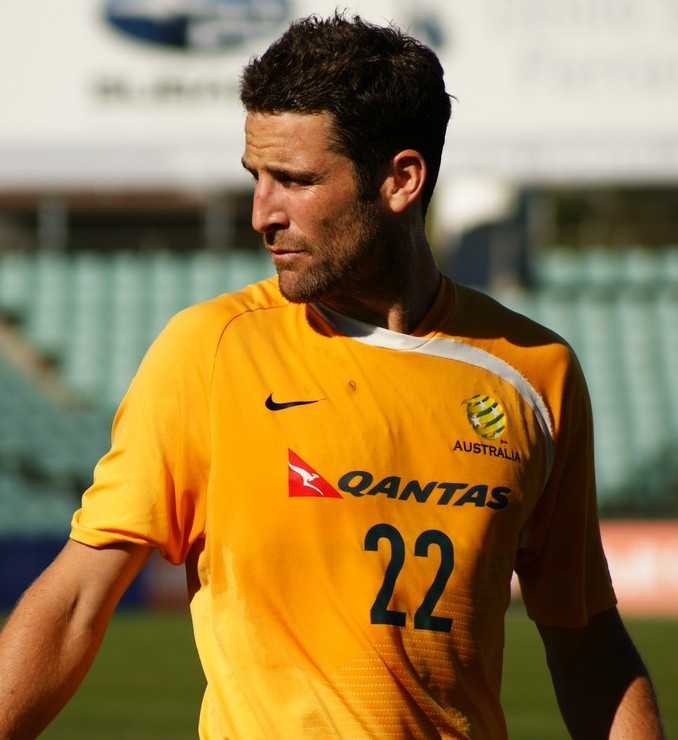
Future Australia international Chris Coyne gained experience on loan early in the 1998–99 season, making eight appearances.

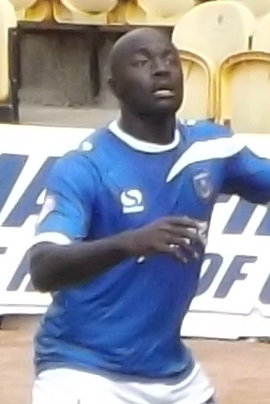
Future Ghana international forward Patrick Agyemang was signed on a three-month loan from Wimbledon in October 1999.

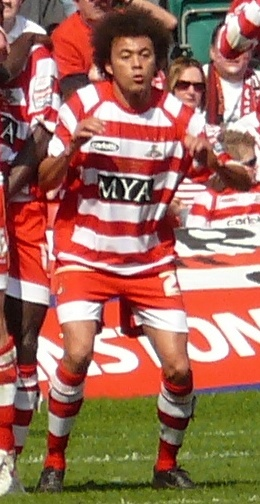
Former Wales U21 defender/midfielder Jason Price signed on a three-month deal in 2001 and made 18 appearances.

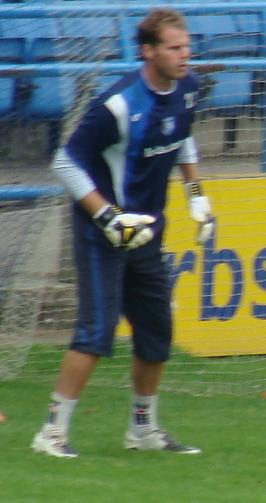
Northern Ireland U21 goalkeeper Alan Julian spent three years as understudy to Paul Smith and Stuart Nelson, making 19 appearances.

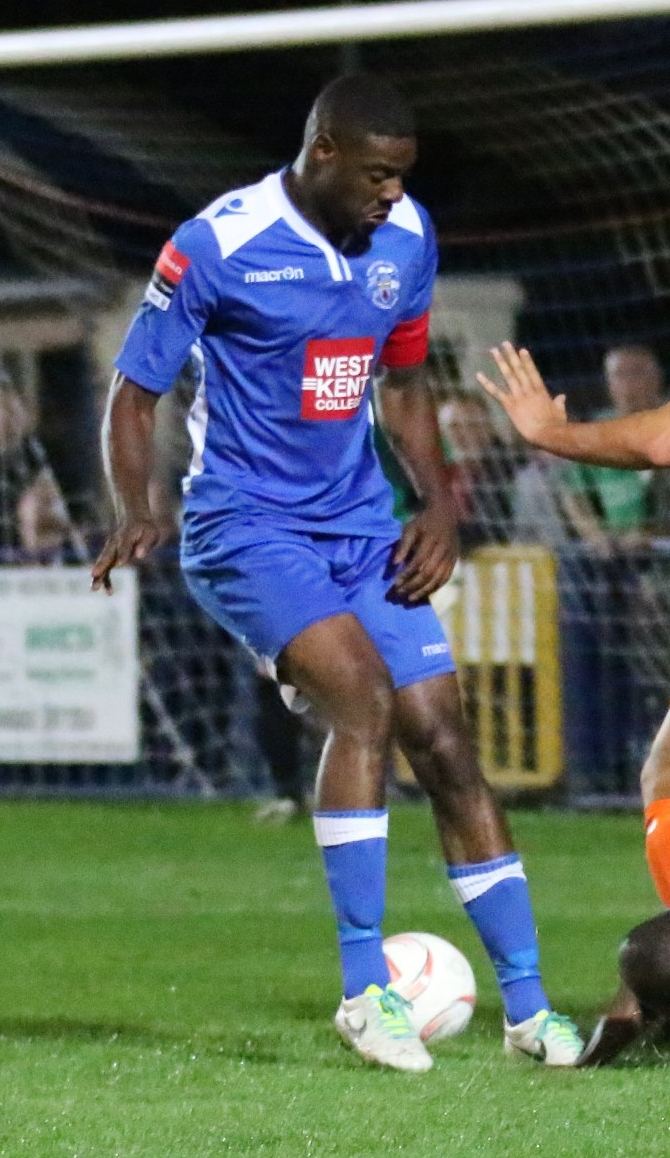
On loan central defender Jerrome Sobers scored on his only appearance for the club in May 2005.

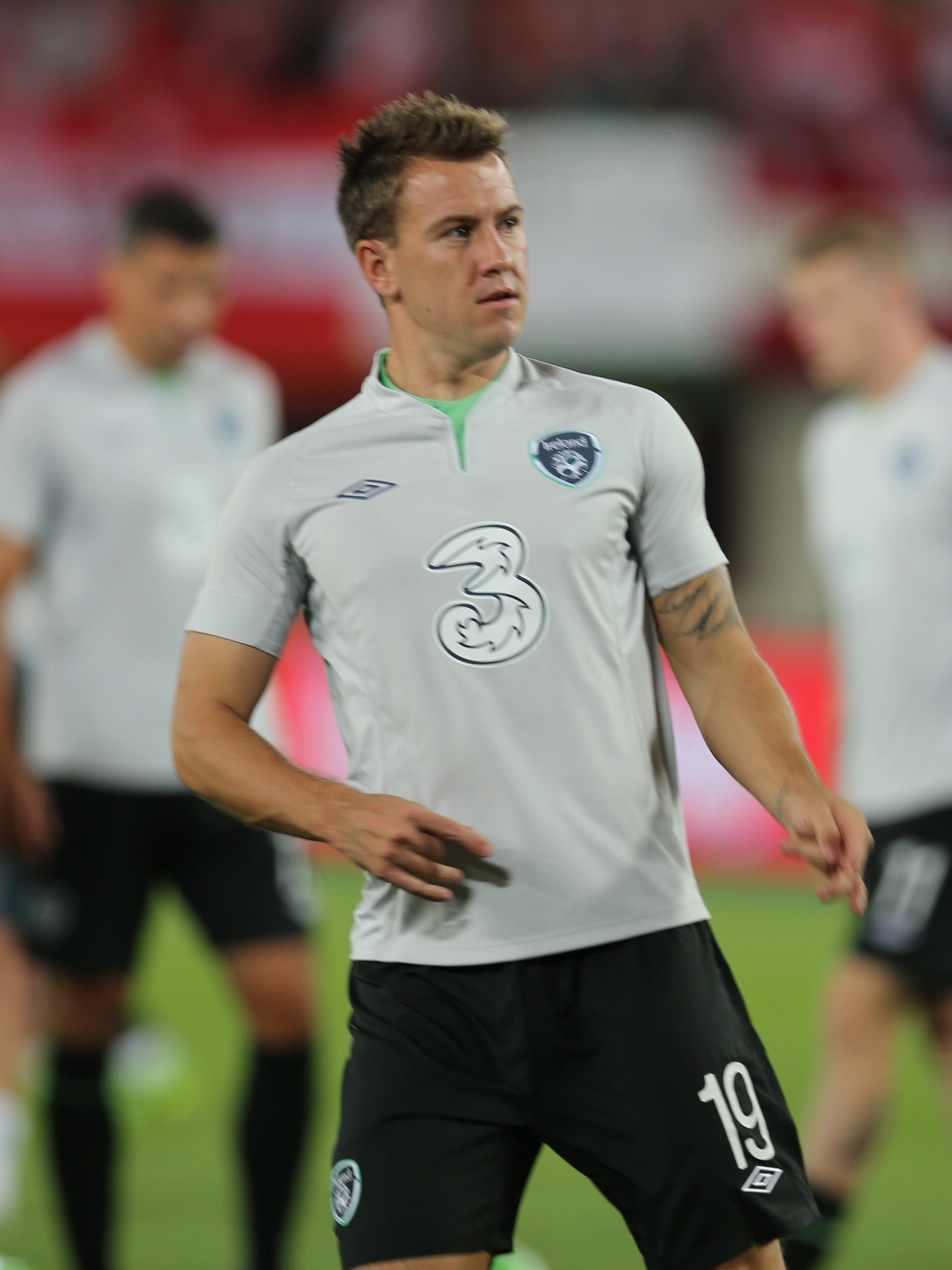
Future Republic of Ireland international striker Simon Cox had two spells on loan from Reading during the 2006–07 season.

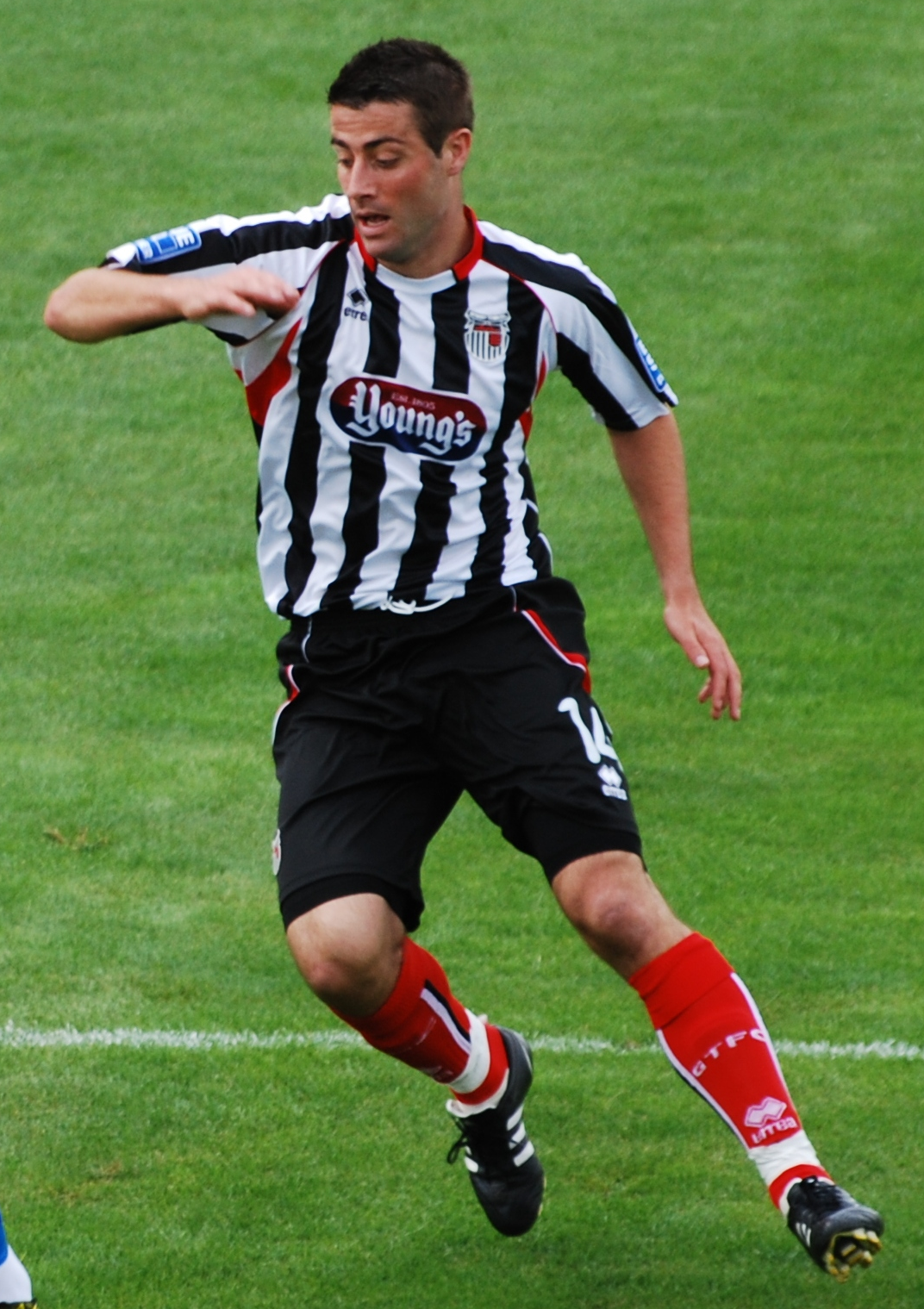
On-loan Luton Town midfielder Michael Leary amassed 10 yellow cards in 17 appearances in 2007.

Che Wilson made three appearances during a five-week loan from Southend United in 2007.

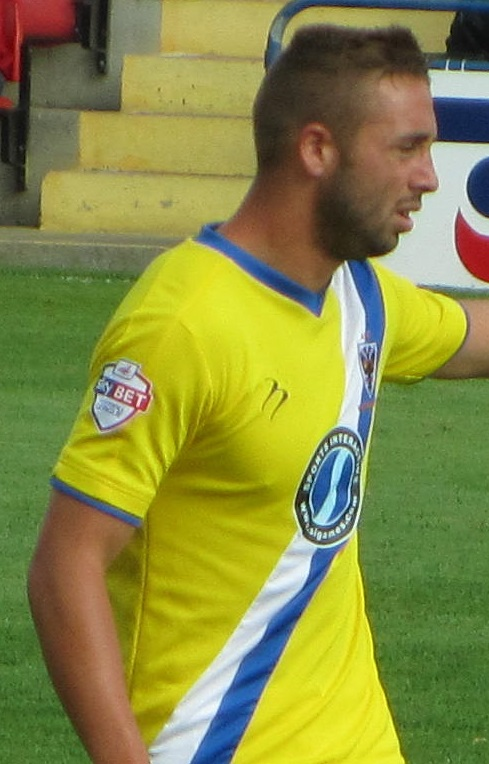
Sammy Moore quickly became a fan favourite for his tenacious midfield performances on loan from Ipswich Town during the 2007–08 season.

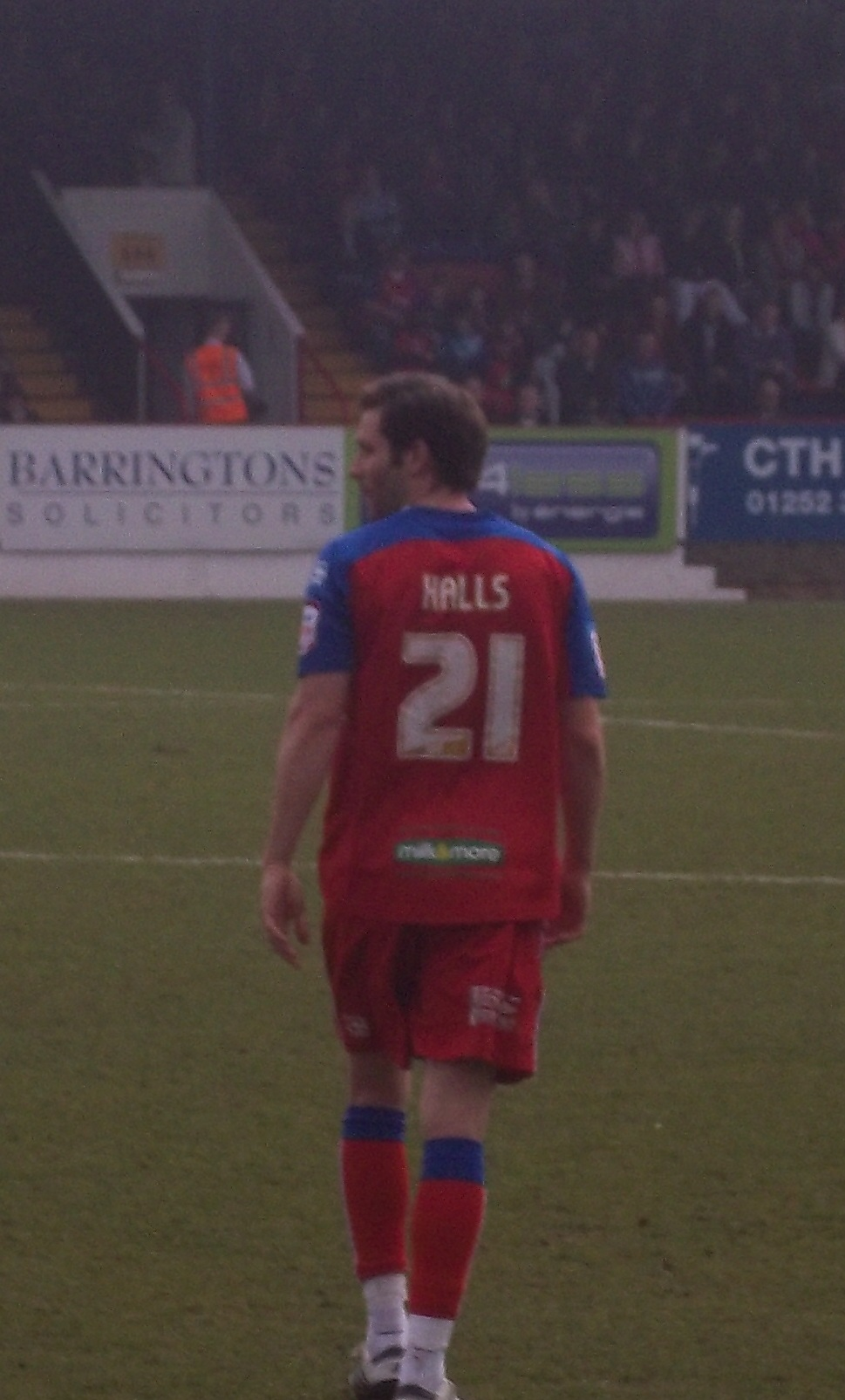
A former Premier League player with Reading, John Halls' 24 appearances during the 2008–09 season won him a League Two championship medal.

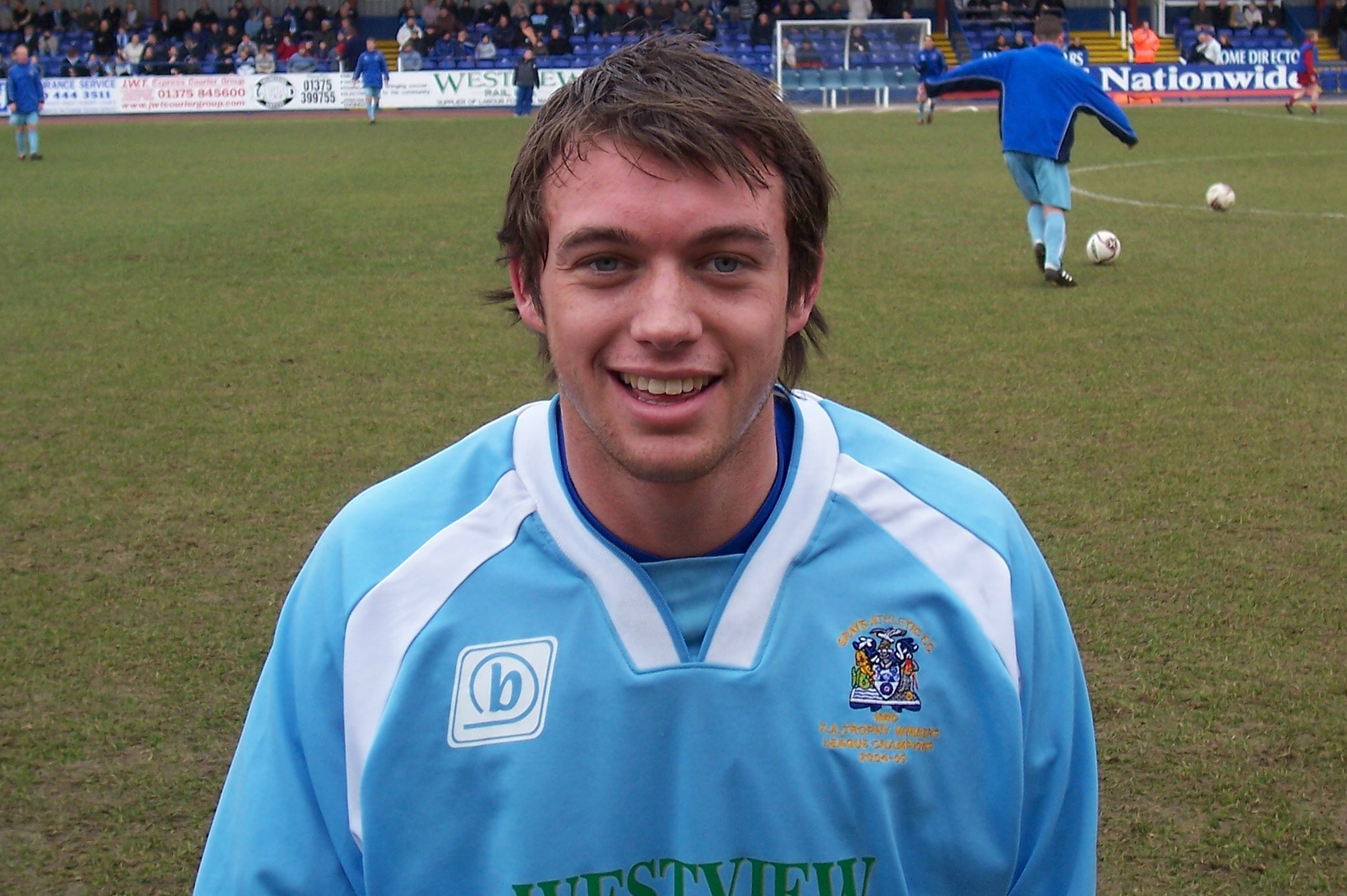
Brentford was the second of centre back Brett Johnson's two league clubs. He made 12 appearances during the 2008–09 season.

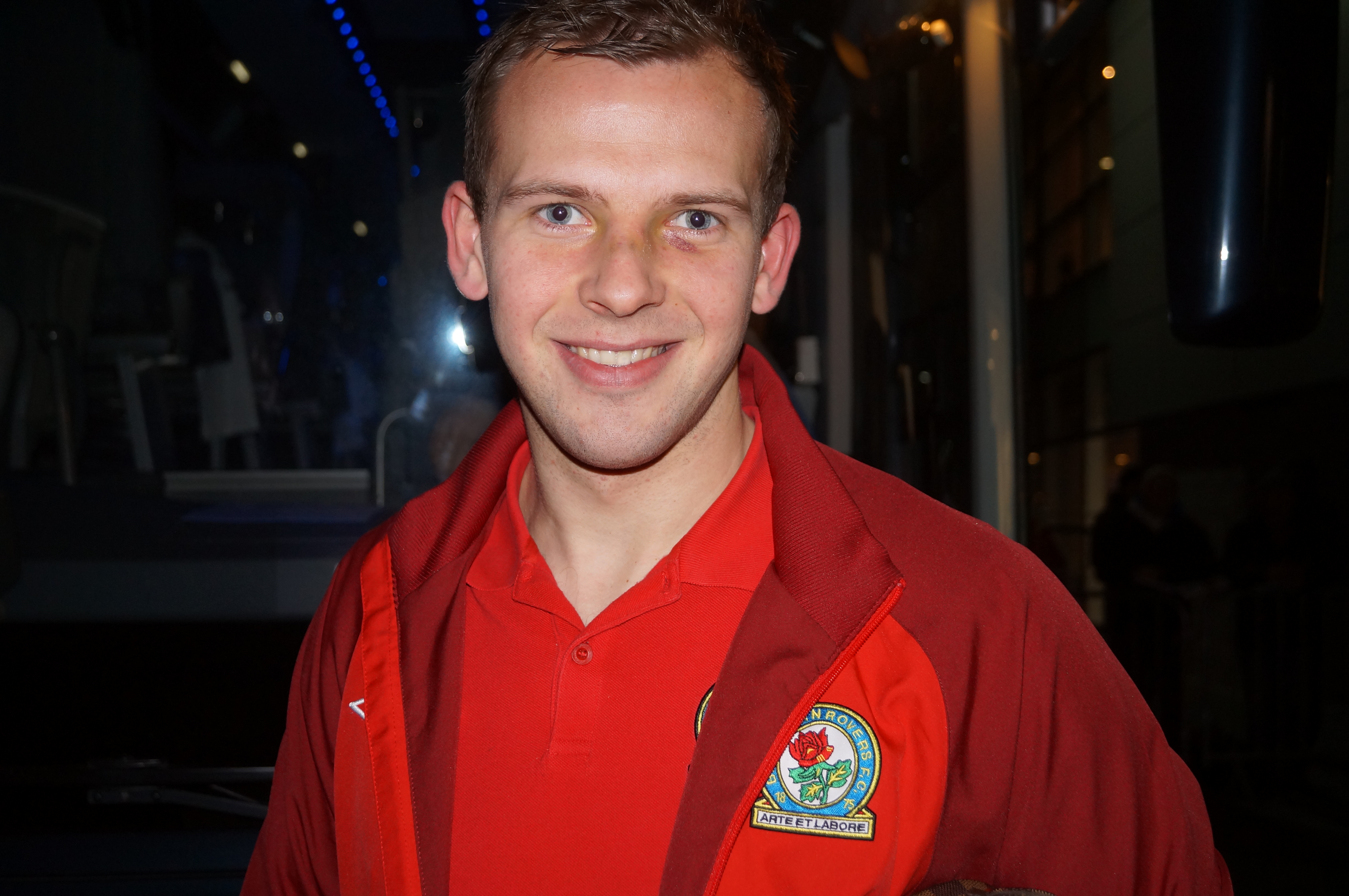
Ipswich Town loanee Jordan Rhodes scored seven goals in 14 games in the second half of the 2008–09 season. He was later capped by Scotland.

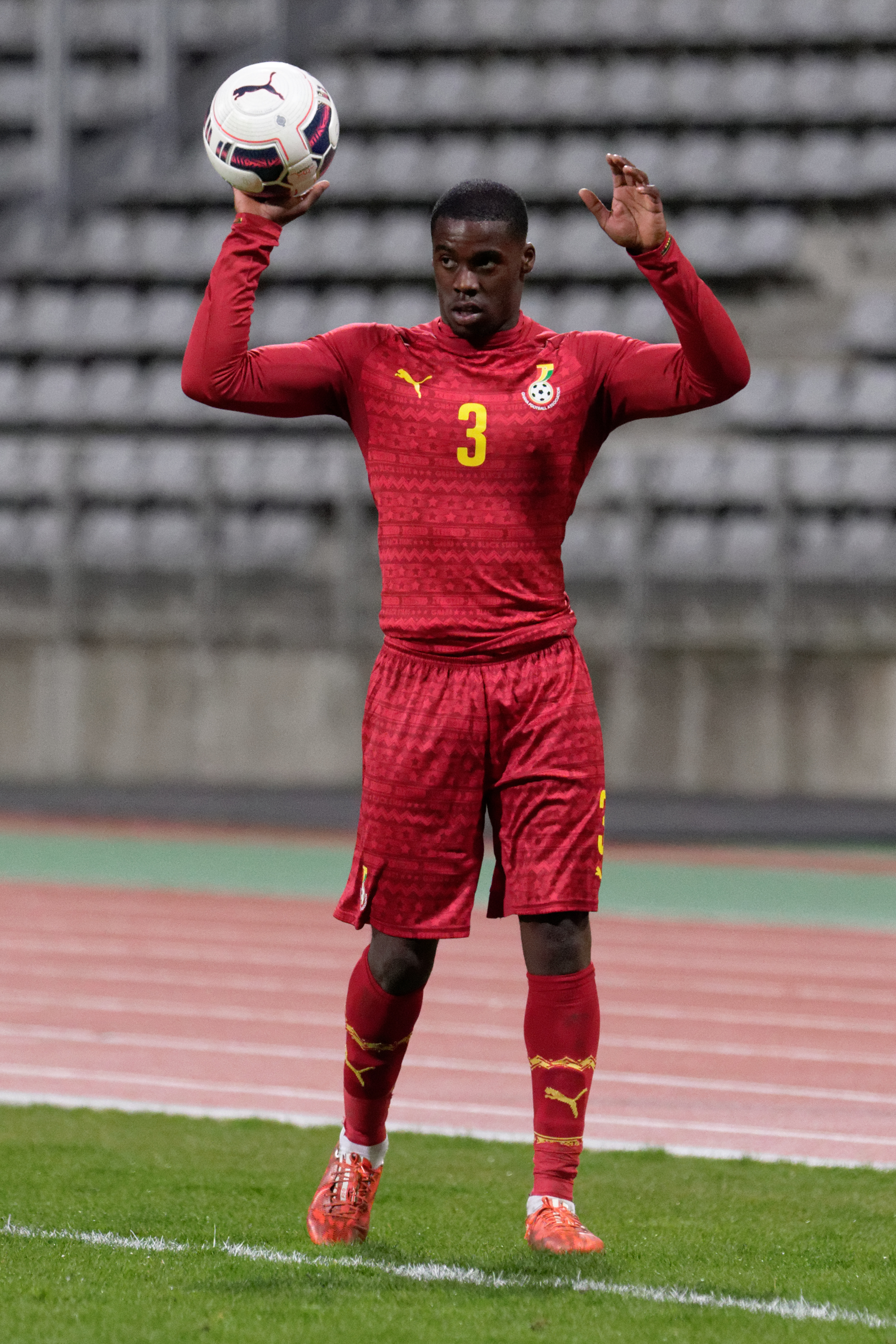
On loan Leicester City forward Jeffrey Schlupp scored six goals in 10 games during the final two months of the 2010–11 season. He went on to represent Ghana at international level.

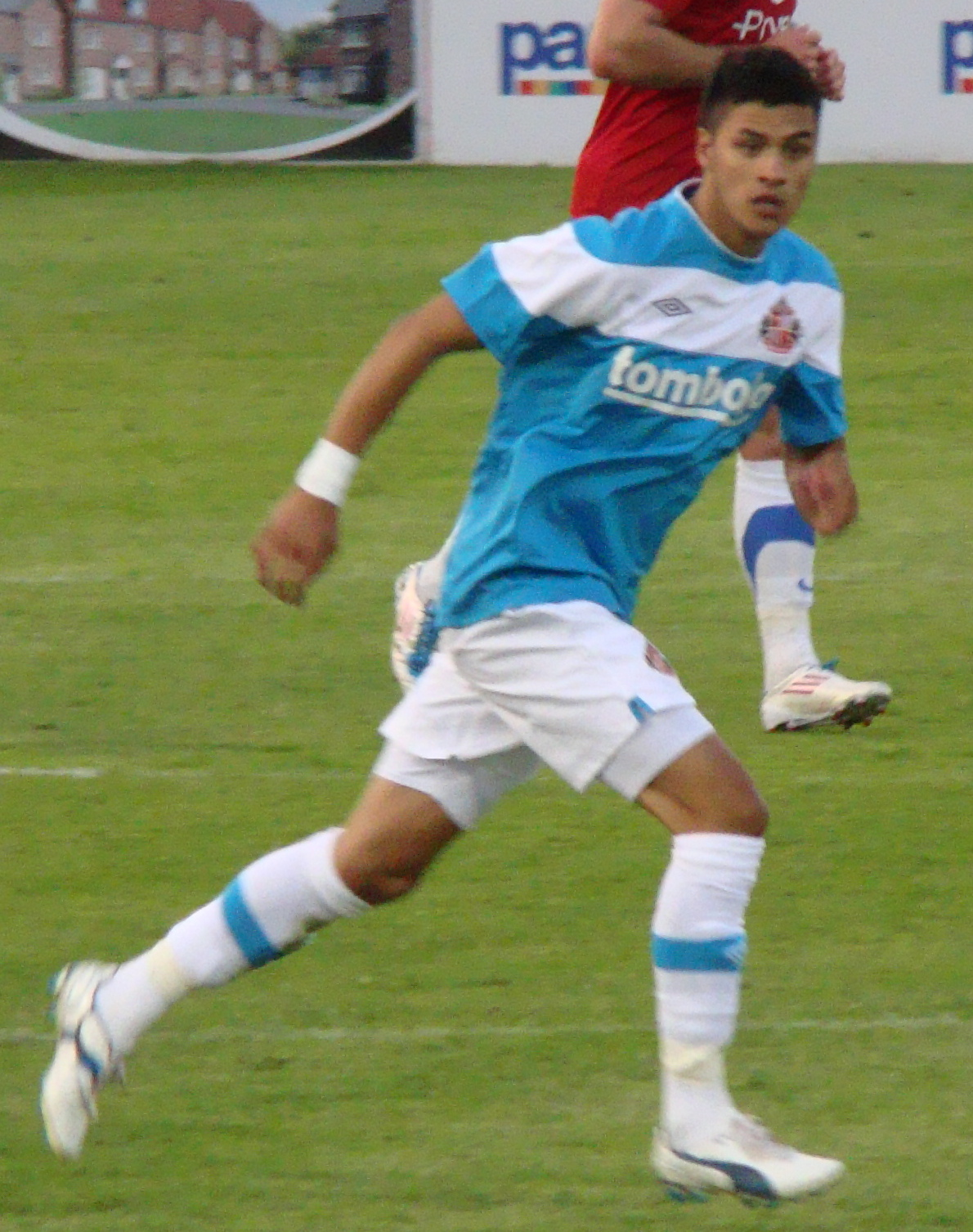
Young midfielder Adam Reed made his professional debut while on loan from Sunderland in March 2011.

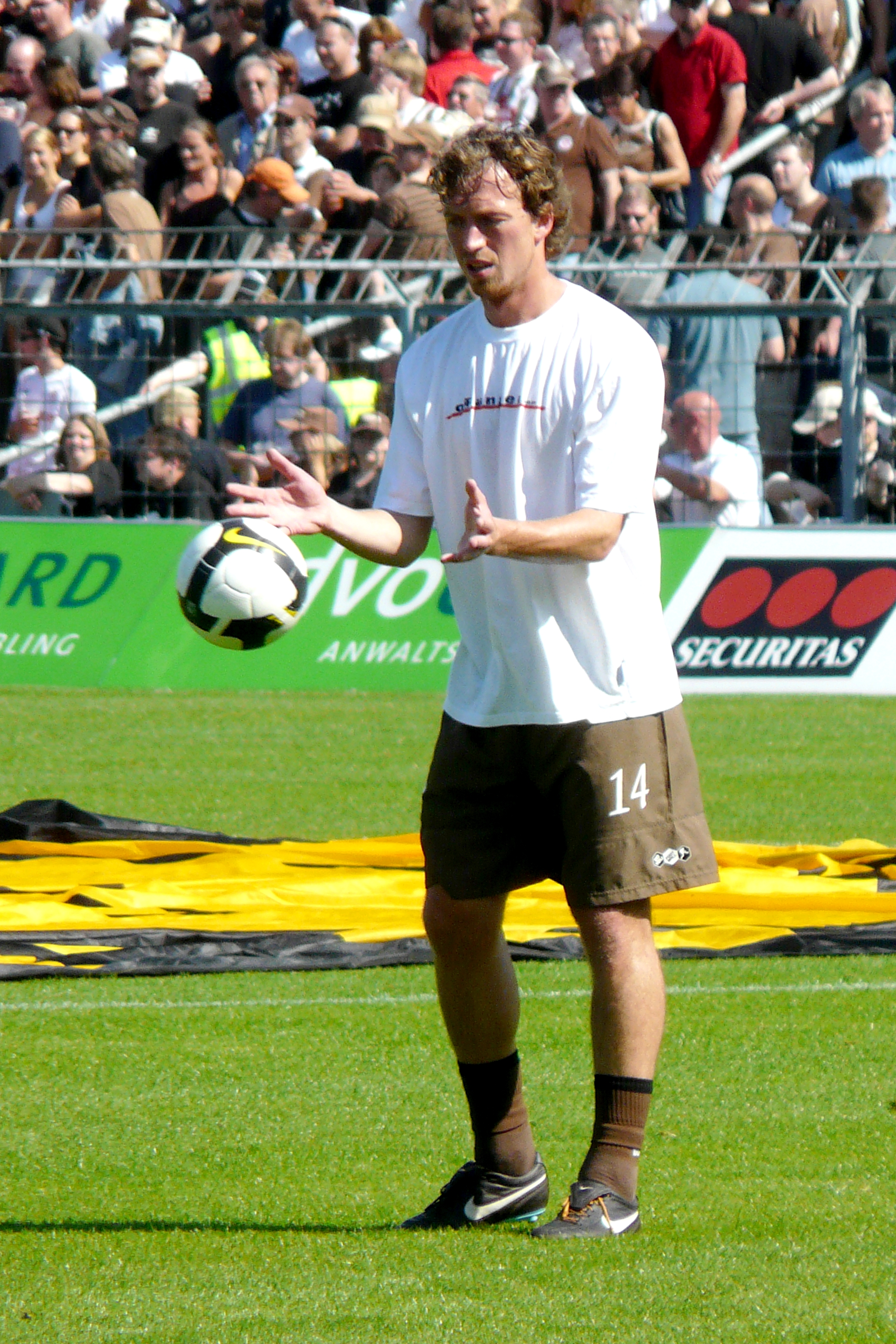
Former St. Pauli centre back Marcel Eger struggled to adapt to English football and made just 22 appearances during his only season at Griffin Park.

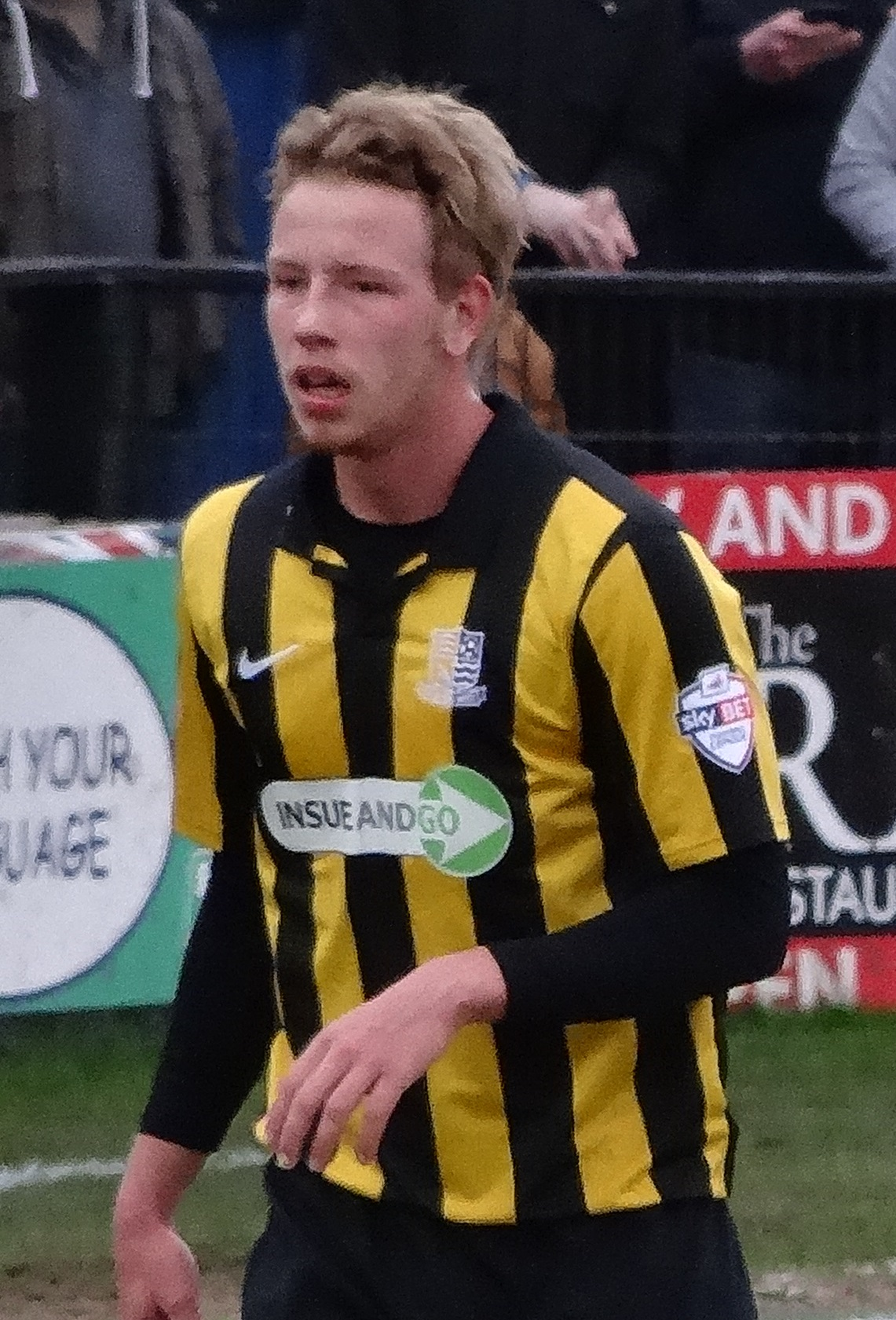
Northern Ireland U21 international defender Adam Thompson was one of many players with Watford connections signed on loan in 2011 and 2012.

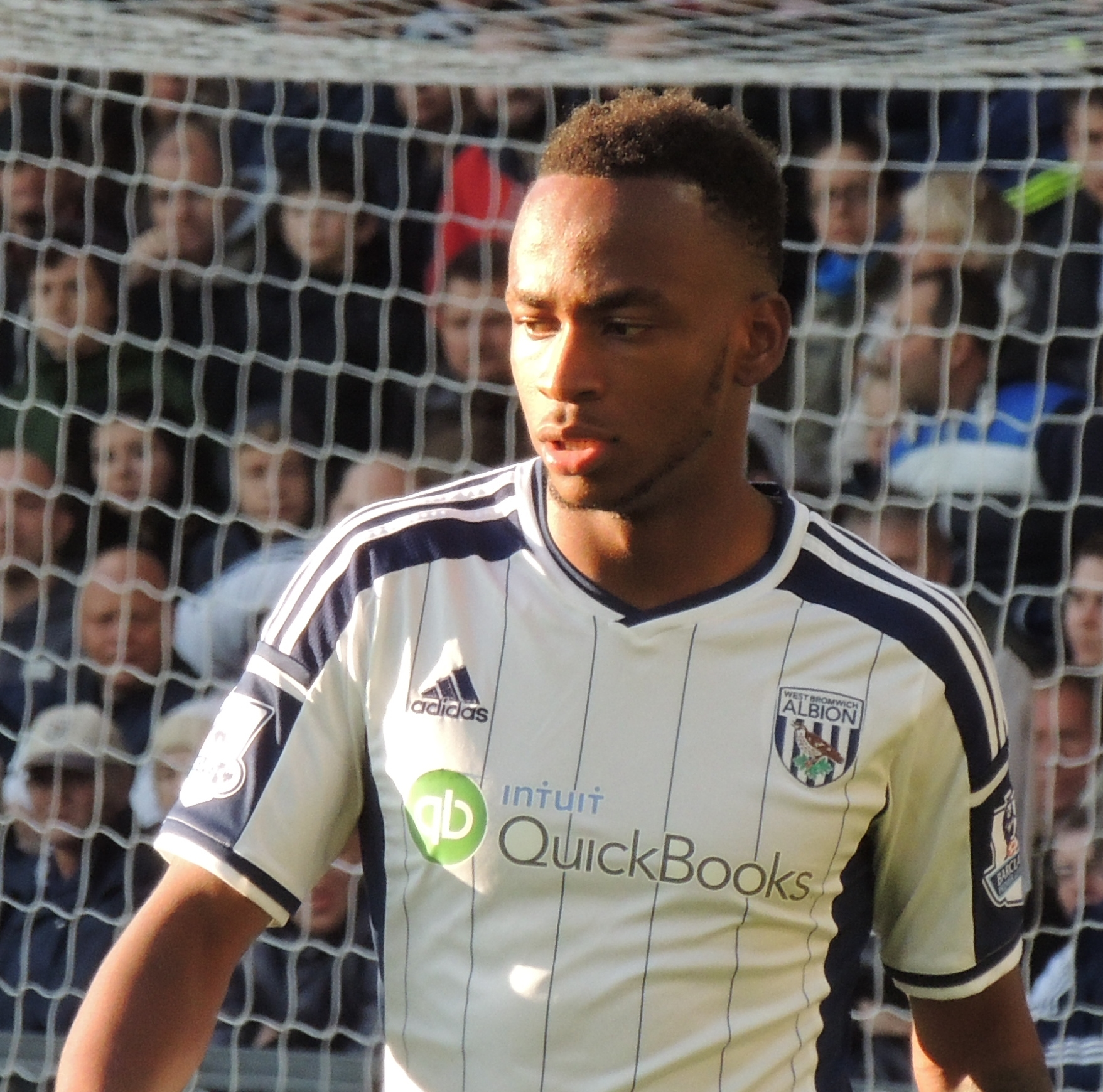
West Bromwich Albion forward Saido Berahino scored four goals in eight games in early 2012, before having his loan cut short due to disciplinary problems.

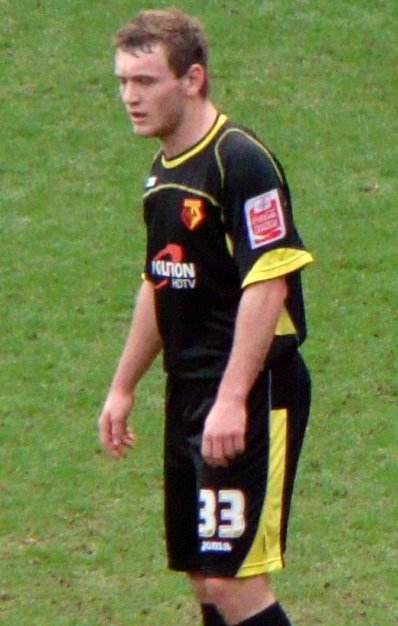
Former Northern Ireland international right back Lee Hodson made 18 appearances on loan from Watford during the 2012–13 season.

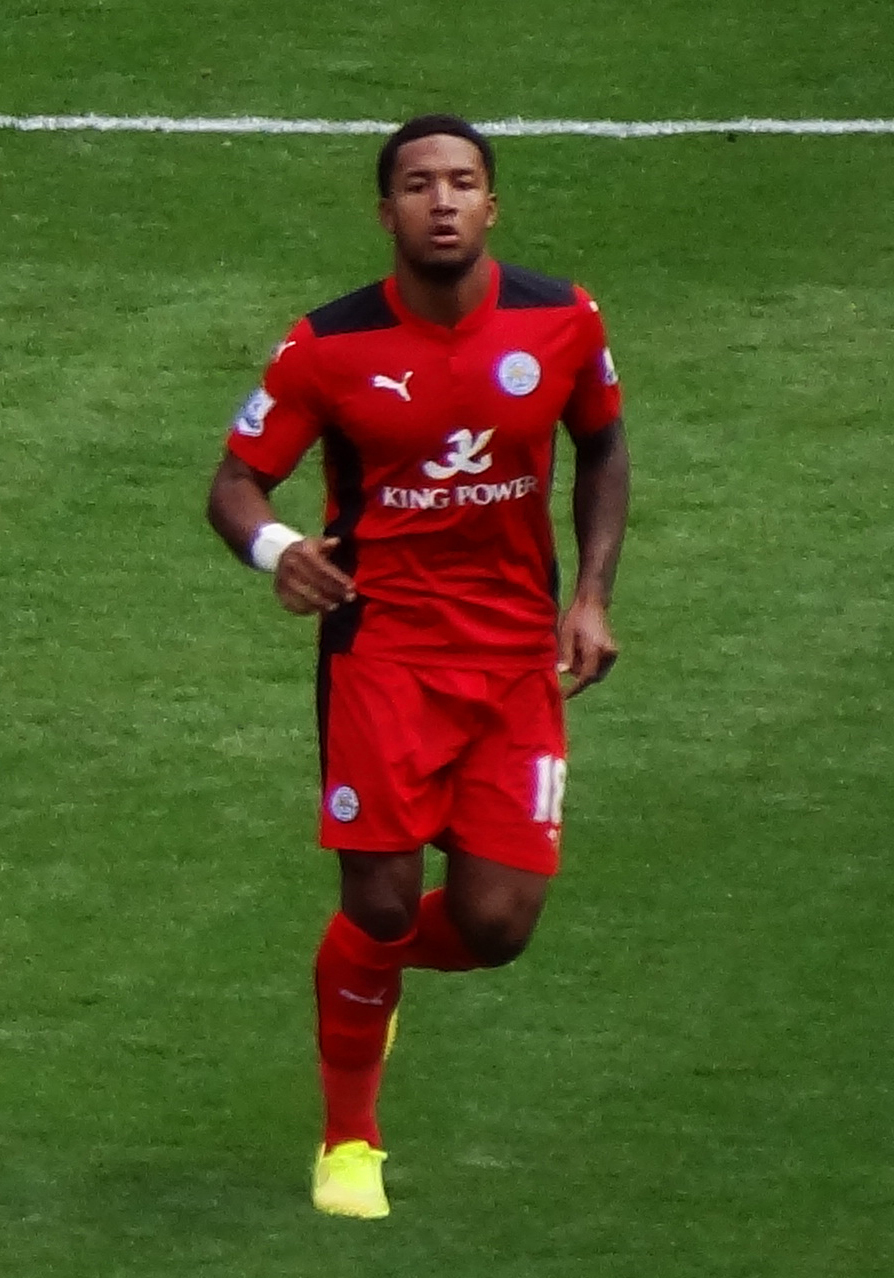
Leicester City's England U21 international centre back Liam Moore made seven appearances on loan in 2013 before being recalled. He rejoined on loan in 2015.

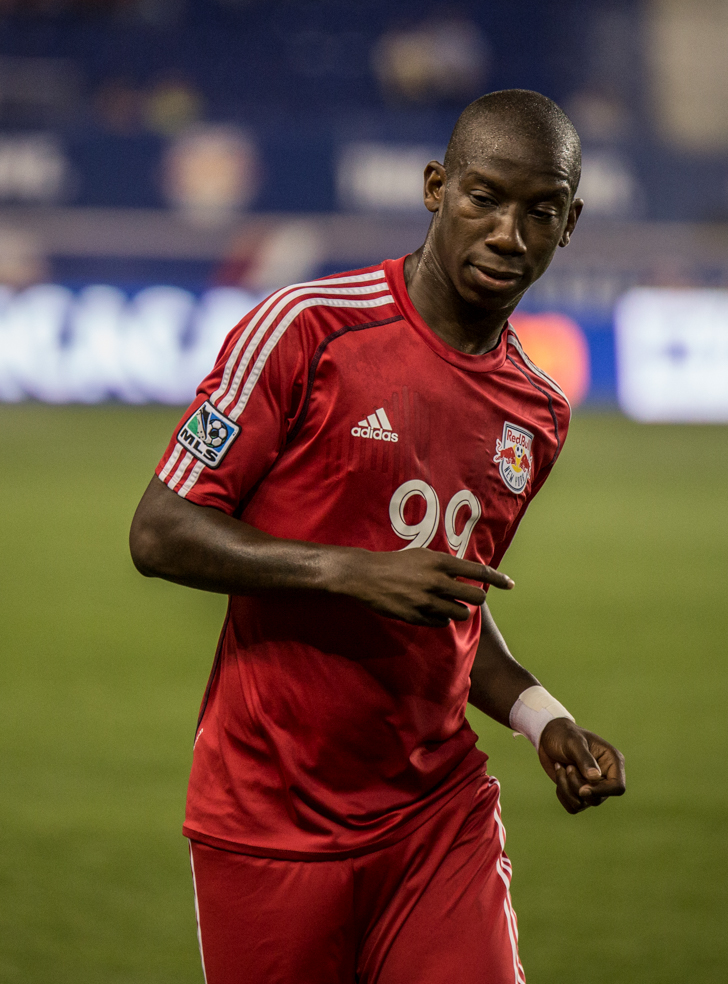
Signed on loan from Charlton Athletic to bolster the attack during the 2012–13 season run-in, Bradley Wright-Phillips scored five goals in 15 games.

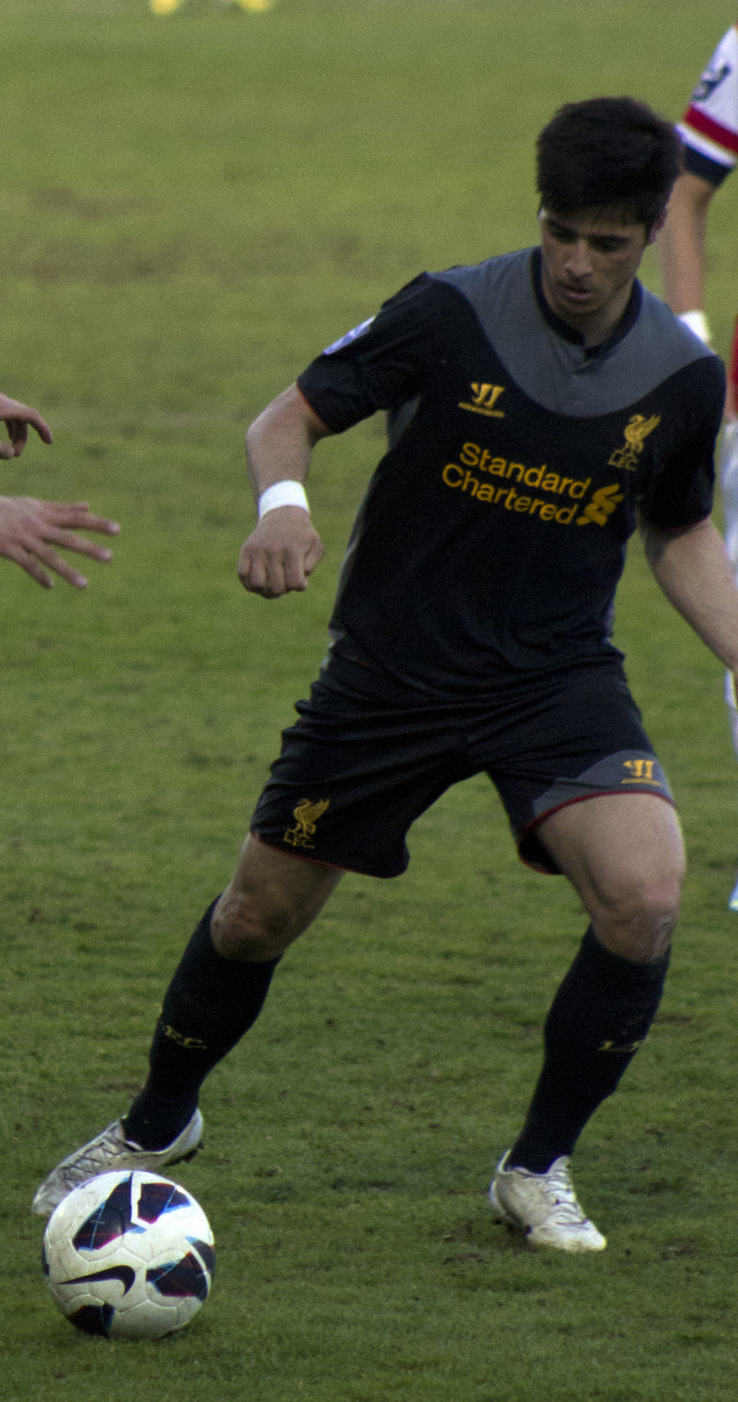
Liverpool's Portuguese U21 midfielder João Carlos Teixeira made the first professional appearance of his career while on loan at Brentford in September 2013.

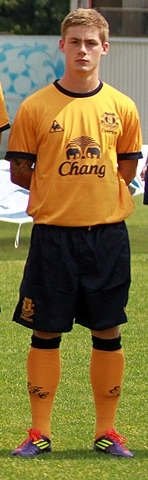
Young Everton striker Conor McAleny's half-season loan was cut short in late August 2013, when he broke his leg on his fourth appearance.

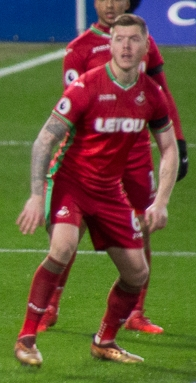
A product of the Brentford youth system, centre back Alfie Mawson made one appearance before his departure in 2015.

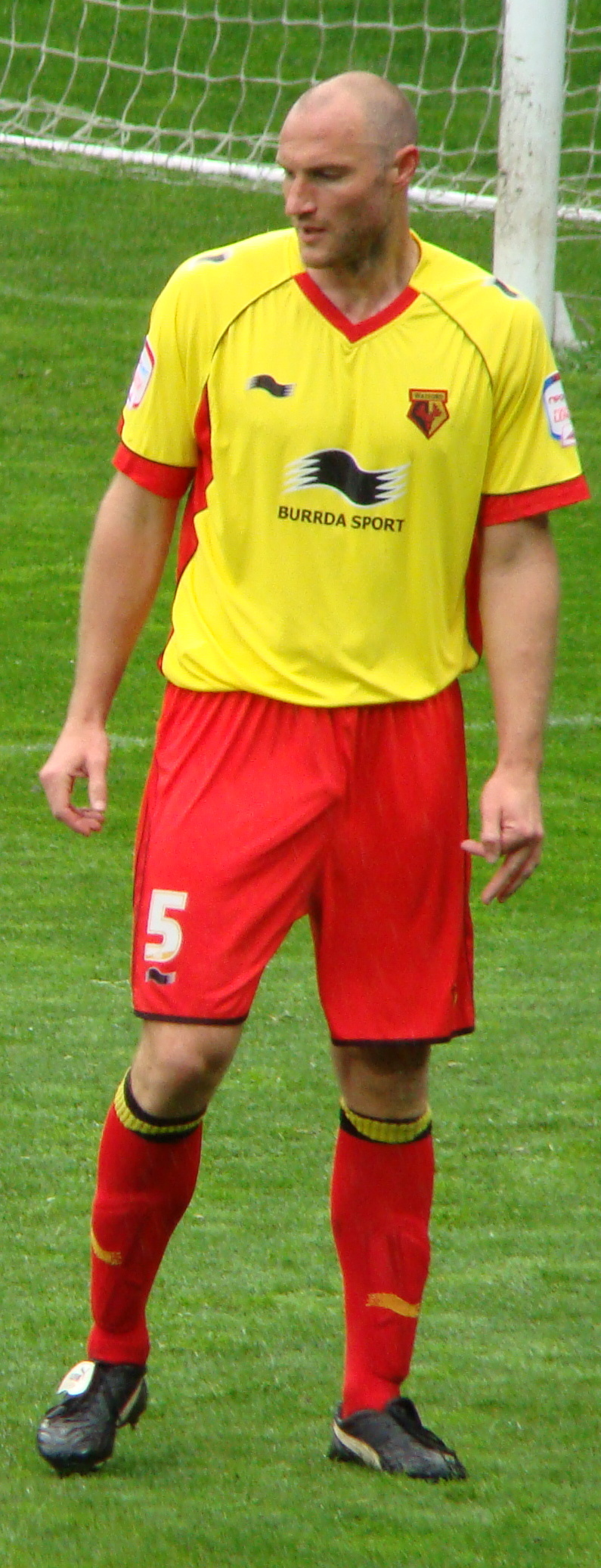
Sheffield Wednesday centre back Martin Taylor was signed on loan to alleviate a defensive injury crisis early in the 2013–14 season.

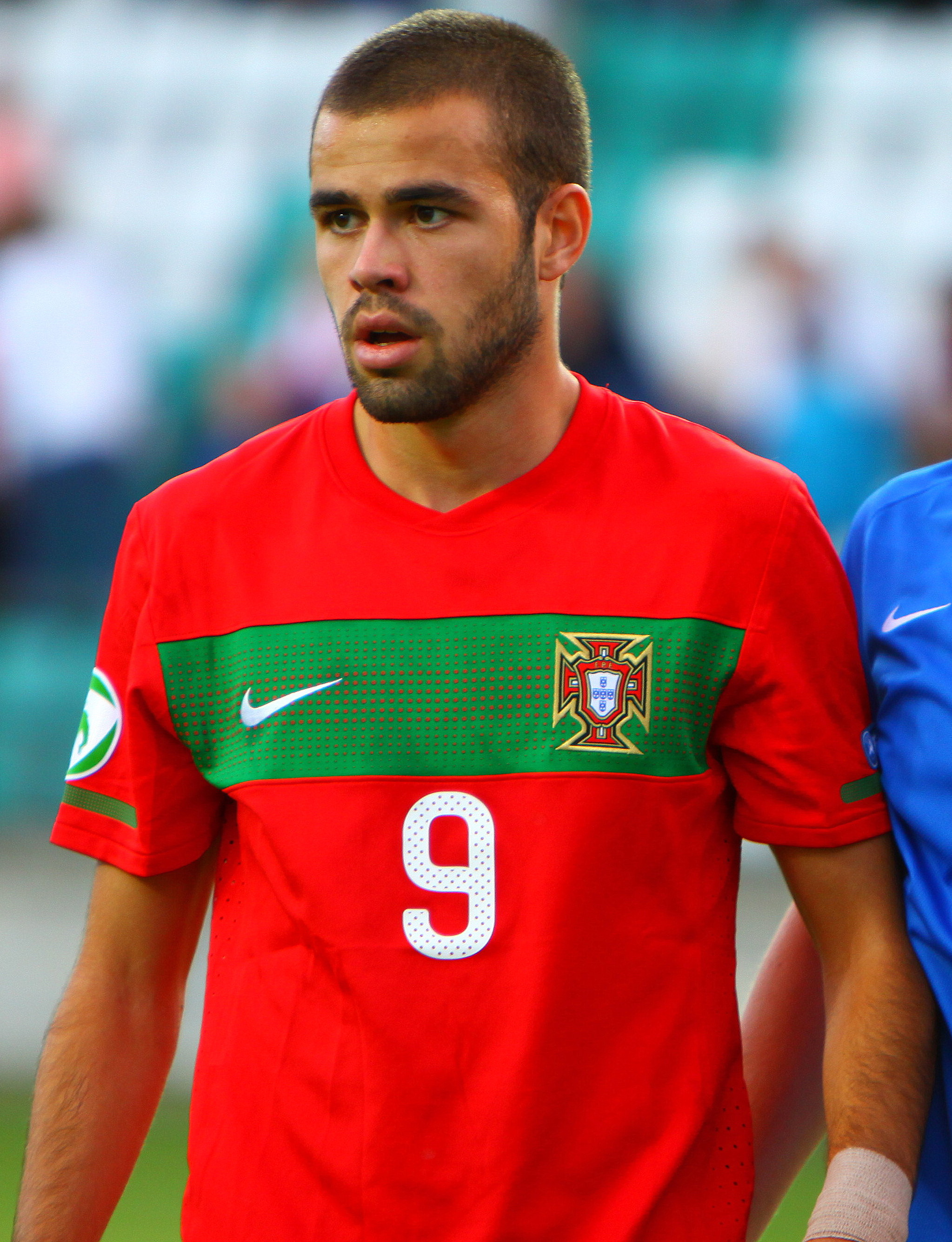
Signed on a season-long loan from Sporting CP, Portugal U21 international Betinho made his only Brentford appearance in September 2014.

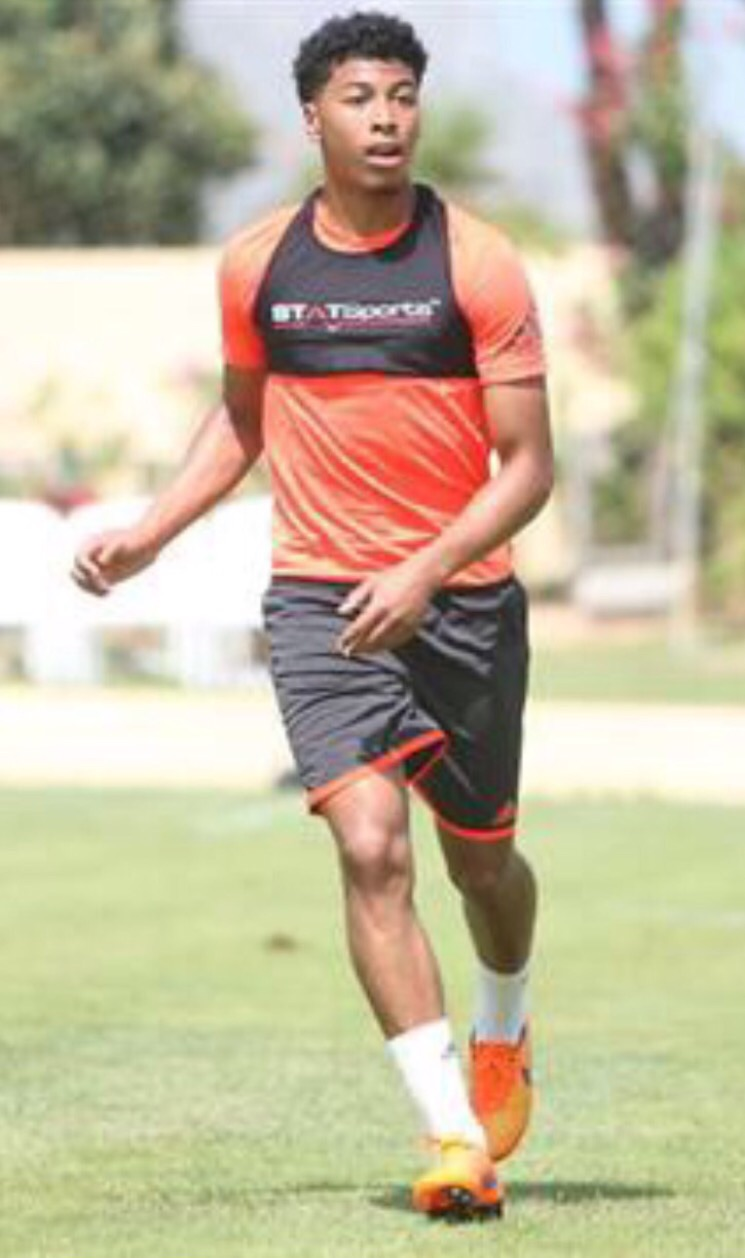
Development Squad player Josh Laurent made one first team appearance before his release in February 2016.

=== Early years (1889–1898) ===
Name	Nationality	Position	Brentford career	Appearances	Goals	Notes	Ref
George Bloomer	England	FW	1891–1892	2	3	(Note: Some appearance and goal records are untraced during the seasons in which the player played.)	
H. Leslie Edwardes	England	GK	1891–1892	1	0		
Collie Bennett	England	FW	1892–1893	1	0		
Henry Gomm	England	FW	1892–1893	2	0		
Tom Gomm	England	HB	1892–1893	2	0		
Arthur Harriss	England	GK	1892–1893	2	0		
Tom Knights	England	HB	1892–1893	2	0		
Steve Phillips	England	FB	1892–1893	2	0		
Will Phillips	England	FW	1892–1895	19	3		
Christopher Saunders	England	FW	1892–1894	14	4		
W. Vaughan	England	FW	1892–1893	3	0		
Frank Beckett	England	FB/FW	1893–1895	18	0		
T. Holding	England	HB	1893	1	0		
Charlie Pratley	England	FW	1893–1895	12	9		
Alex Ward	n/a	HB	1893–1895	15	0		
A. Adams	n/a	FW	1894–1896	7	2		
William Clements	England	HB	1894–1895	6	1		
Joseph Gettins	England	FW	1894–1895	3	1		
William Johnson	England	FW	1894	6	5		
George Simmonds	England	FW/HB	1894–1895	6	2		
Biggs	n/a	FW	1895	1	0		
W. Campbell	n/a	FW	1895	1	1		
George Hester	England	FW	1895–1896	11	4		
George Whitmarsh	Malta	FW	1895–1897	17	3		
Harry Williams	England	FW/FB	1895–1898	15	8		
G. E. Bailey	England	FW	1896–1897	10	4		
Harold Hudson	England	FW	1896–1898	18	7		
L. Ingram	England	FW	1896–1897	2	2		
Shields	n/a	FB	1896	1	0		
Billy Smith	England	HB	1896–1897	10	0		
J. Wade	n/a	FW	1896–1898	13	11		
Batchelor	n/a	FW	1897	1	1		
Fred Butcher	England	FW	1897–1898	4	2		
A. E. Collins	England	FB	1897	1	0		
George Haslen	England	HB	1897–1898	5	0		
E. J. Osborne	England	HB/FW	1897	3	0		
Arthur Pring	England	HB	1897	1	0		
Hilton Saunders	England	FW	1897	1	0		
'J. Bee'	n/a	HB	1898	1	0	(Note: Player played under an alias.)	
Blunt	n/a	HB	1898	1	0		
C. W. Fox	England	FW	1898	1	1		
W. Harrison	England	HB	1898	2	0		
David Lloyd	England	FW	1898	9	3		
'A. Newman'	n/a	FW	1898	1	2		
G. Pearce	England	HB	1898	2	0		
Harry Pennington	England	GK	1898	15	0		
J. T. Read	England	FB	1898	1	0		
James Rough	Scotland	FW	1898	4	0		
W. G. Walker	England	HB	1898–1900	22	4		
Arthur Yeoman	England	HB	1898	4	0		

=== Southern League era (1898–1920) ===
Name	Nationality	Position	Brentford career	Appearances	Goals	Notes	Ref
'A. D. Gosling'	n/a	FB	1898	2	0		
Frederick Johnson	England	FW	1898–1899	15	7		
Frank Lewis	Wales	FB	1898–1899	8	0		
William Mehew	England	HB	1898–1900	11	0		
J. McMillan	n/a	FW	1898	1	1		
John Owen	Wales	FW	1898	1	0		
George Turner	Scotland	FB	1898–1900	14	1		
C. Ward	n/a	FW	1898	6	9		
William Westhead	England	HB	1898–1899	23	1		
William Allwright	England	LB	1899–1900	5	1		
Benjamin Asbury	England	FW	1899–1900	9	2		
John Bayne	Scotland	FW	1899; 1903	4	2		
Ben Brown	England	GK	1899–1900	23	0		
Frank Burton	Scotland	GK	1899	1	0		
J. Chambers	England	FW	1899	2	0		
John Cotton	England	HB/FW	1899	2	0		
F. Dean	England	HB	1899	4	0		
E. H. Dicks	England	FB	1899–1900	17	0		
B. Edwards	England	FW	1899–1900	10	1		
Henry Gill	Scotland	GK/HB	1899	3	0		
W. Hancock	England	FW	1899	2	0		
Hay	n/a	HB	1899	1	0		
Joseph Hood	England	U	1899–1900	3	0		
Bert Lane	England	FB	1899–1900	11	0		
G. Pearce	England	HB	1899	7	0		
George Pollitt	England	FB	1899	1	0		
J. T. Read	England	U	1899	3	0		
Harry Thurston	England	FW	1899	2	0		
A. Watt	England	FW	1899–1900	11	2		
Bert Allen	England	FW	1900	1	0		
R. Allen	England	HB/FW	1900	3	0		
S. Andrews	England	GK	1900	1	0		
'Bailey'	n/a	FW	1900	1	0		
Henry Beagley	England	FW	1900–1901	3	0		
Frederick Carte	England	FW	1900	1	0		
Dave Clear	England	GK	1900–1901	18	0		
R. Davis	England	FB	1900	1	0		
P. Duncan	Scotland	HB	1900	1	0		
Jack Graham	England	FB	1900–1901	11	0		
M. Granger	England	FW	1900	1	0		
Billy Green	England	GK/CH	1900–1903	23	0		
William Hainsworth	England	HB	1900–1903	22	0		
Louis Hare	England	GK	1900	3	0		
Harry Harris	England	U	1900–1903	14	1		
John Haugh	Scotland	FB	1900	2	0		
William Hickman	England	FW	1900	1	0		
T. Jones	Wales	FB/HB	1900	7	0		
William Knight	England	FW	1900	1	0		
J. Lucas	England	HB	1900	3	0		
S. Marshall	England	GK	1900	1	0		
Roddy McLeod	Scotland	FW	1900–1902	24	14		
Walter Neal	England	HB	1900–1901	3	0		
John Pilgrim	England	FB	1900	1	0		
Alfred Townsend	England	FW	1900	2	0		
Joe Turner	England	FW	1900–1901	21	11		
S. Vincent	England	FW	1900	8	0		
Thomas Briddon	England	HB	1901	1	0		
Harry Crump	England	FW/HB	1901–1902	6	1		
Francis Dexter	England	FW	1901	2	0		
Tom Grieve	Scotland	OR	1901–1902	22	1		
Horace Jury	England	FW	1901–1902	18	3		
Paddy Logan	Scotland	IF	1901–1902	22	4		
Ranald McSwan	Scotland	FW	1901	5	1		
Henry Spawton	England	FW	1901	1	0		
Henry Squires	England	FW	1901–1902	4	0		
A. Wylie	Scotland	FB	1901	2	0		
Ball	n/a	FB	1902	1	0		
Charles Carr	England	FW	1902	1	0		
William Childs	England	FW	1902–1903	17	0		
Bob Crone ♦	Ireland	FB	1902–1903	2	0		
Harry Dutfield	England	FB	1902	1	0		
William Halley	Scotland	FB	1902–1903	15	0		
Bill Keech	England	HB	1902–1903	21	0		
Arthur Newsome	England	HB	1902–1903	23	0		
John Parkinson	England	FW/HB	1902	5	1		
George Pickering	England	FW	1902–1903	15	2		
E. Roberts	n/a	HB	1902	1	0		
Thomas Shufflebotham	England	HB	1902–1903	16	0		
Leonard Walker	England	FW	1902	2	0		
Arnold Warren	England	FW	1902–1903	22	2		
George Bishop	England	GK	1903–1904	3	0		
Ralph Brett	England	FW	1903–1904	17	1		
Joe Connor	Ireland	IR	1903	12	2		
Joe Frail	England	GK	1903	15	0		
Frederick Jordan	Ireland	FW	1903	1	0		
Charles Lanham	England	FW	1903–1904	4	0		
Tommy Leigh	England	FW	1903–1904	24	4		
James Swarbrick	England	FW	1903–1905	21	1		
Frederick Williams	England	HB	1903	1	0		
John Barron	Scotland	FW	1904	9	2		
John Boag	Scotland	CF	1904	2	0		
Harry Fletcher	England	FW	1904–1905	23	3		
George Gates	England	RH/FW	1904–1906	15	3		
Bill Howarth	England	GK	1904	1	0		
Frank Oliver	England	FW	1904–1905	12	3		
Alex Walker	Scotland	FW	1904–1905	8	0		
Bob Watson	Scotland	GK	1904	6	0		
Walter Cookson	England	FW	1905	2	0		
Willie Cross	Scotland	FW	1905–1906	16	1		
Jack Dewhurst	England	FW	1905	4	0		
Chris Duffy	England	FW	1905	6	0		
William McBride	United States	GK	1905	1	0		
John Moulder	England	FW	1905	2	0		
Harry Robotham	England	RH	1905–1906	21	0		
James Shinner	England	FB	1905	7	2		
David Greaves	England	FW	1906–1907	10	6		
James Greechan	Scotland	IL	1906–1907	12	2		
Neve Grice	England	OR	1906–1907	2	0		
Joshua Hardisty	England	HB	1906	1	0		
Robert Haworth	England	HB	1906–1907	10	0		
Lindsay Syrad	England	FW	1906–1910	18	1		
Raymond Abbott	England	FB	1907–1908	6	0		
Albert Bull	England	FB/HB	1907	3	0		
Vince Hayes	England	FB	1907–1908	13	0		
James Lloyd-Evans	England	OF	1907	2	0		
John McConnell	Scotland	FB	1907	2	0		
John McCourt	Scotland	IL	1907	1	0		
John Montgomery	Scotland	GK	1907–1908	19	0		
Alex Glen	Scotland	FW	1908–1909	11	3		
John Gordon	Scotland	HB	1908	3	0		
Gladstone Hamilton	Scotland	FW	1908	3	0		
Joe Hisbent	England	HB	1908–1909	16	0		
William Jaffray	Scotland	FW	1908	4	0		
Alex McCulloch	Scotland	FW	1908	12	3		
Arthur Nicholson	England	FW	1908–1909	7	3		
George Podmore	England	HB	1908	1	0		
Ernest Ramsden	England	FB	1908–1909	12	1		
Arthur Cowley	England	FW	1909	2	0		
Billy Grassam	Scotland	FW	1909–1910	4	0		
Bill McCafferty	Scotland	FW	1909–1910	18	3		
James McDonald	England	IF	1909–1911	5	0		
Ronald McKenzie	Scotland	CF	1909	10	1		
George Rushton	England	OR	1909–1910	16	2		
Tommy Stewart	England	FB	1909–1910	14	0		
Alf Walker	England	OL	1909–1910	14	3		
Albert Wise	England	GK	1909	1	0		
Charlie Blackall	England	HB	1910	7	0		
John Christie	Scotland	RB/LH	1910	5	0	(Note: Represented the London XI.)	
George Frost (c)	England	FW	1910–1911	7	0		
Jack Land	England	HB/FW	1910–1911; 1915	5	0		
Walter Allen	England	HB	1911	2	0		
Arthur Cleverley	England	FB	1911–1912	14	0		
Harry Furr	England	GK	1911	8	0		
Thomas Graham	England	FW	1911–1912	17	4		
Henry Purver	England	FW	1911–1912	2	0		
Fred Rouse	England	FW	1911–1912	17	5		
Hugh Dolby	England	FW	1912	4	0		
Willie Furr	England	FW	1912	2	0		
John Morrison	Scotland	FW	1912–1913	10	0		
Charles Symes	England	FW	1912–1914	4	0		
Tommy Clark	England	FW	1913	4	3		
Charlie Elliott	England	FW	1913–1914	20	2		
Tommy Fells	England	FB	1913–1914	15	0		
Tommy Kent	England	FW	1913–1915	19	2		
Carter	England	FW	1914	1	0		
Jack Cock	England	CF	1914	3	1		
George Curtis	England	HB	1914	3	0		
Jack Curtis	England	OL	1914–1915	16	1		
Herbert Farnfield	England	FW	1914	1	1		
Richard Fraser	England	FW	1914–1915	3	0		
Charles Hibbert	England	FW	1914–1915	11	1		
Percy Matthews	England	FW	1914	3	0		
John Meehan	England	FW	1914	1	1		
Frank Price	England	FB	1914–1915	10	1		
James Sangster	England	FW	1914	2	0		
Richard Sloley	England	IR	1914	6	7		
Stephen Stonley	England	CF	1914–1915	17	5		
Henry White	England	CF	1914–1915	18	9		
Charles Allwright	England	HB	1915	5	0		
Herbert Allwright	England	FW/HB	1915	2	0		
F. Arnold	England	FW	1915	7	2		
Charles Bedell	England	FW	1915	1	0		
Norman Carson	England	FW	1915	2	0		
Walter Chalk	England	FW	1915	9	6		
Harry Crane	England	HB	1915	1	0		
Michael Donaghy	England	FW	1915	7	0		
William Hughes	England	GK	1915	1	0		
Mick O'Brien	Ireland	HB	1915	9	3		
Cecil Salisbury	England	FW	1915	1	0		
Herbert Ashford	England	WH	1919–1920	9	0		
George Cannon	England	IR	1919	6	1		
Harry Dale	England	GK	1919	1	0		
Bertram Gilboy	England	FW	1919–1920	19	3		
Ernest Hanks	England	FW	1919	1	0		
Edward Hawkins	England	FB	1919–1920	14	0		
Robert Parr	England	FW	1919	1	0		
John Searby	England	FW	1919–1920	11	3		
Fred Taylor	England	RH	1919–1920	22	1		
Fred Webster	England	FB	1919–1920	11	0		
Sidney Embury	England	FW	1920	4	1		
John Henery	England	OF	1920–1921	22	1		
James Lockwood	England	FW	1920	1	1		
Walter Loveday	England	FB	1920	1	0		
Bert Spreadbury	England	CF	1920–1921	22	6		

=== Interwar era (1920–1945) ===
Name	Nationality	Position	Brentford career	Appearances	Goals	Notes
Billy Baker	England	OF	1920–1921	4	0	
William Kearney	England	FB	1920–1921	6	0	
Ernest Levitt	England	CH	1920	6	0	
George Smith	England	OF	1920–1921	9	0	
George Taylor	England	OF	1920–1921	23	0	
George Bertram	England	FW	1921	10	2	
John Bethune	Scotland	FB	1921–1922	10	0	
Herbert Cock	England	CF	1921	1	0	
Charles Fisher	England	WH	1921	6	0	
Fred Howe	England	WH	1921	3	0	
Archie Mitchell ♦	England	CH	1921–1922	16	2	(Note: Represented the Football League XI.)
Horace Norton	England	FW	1921–1922	19	3	
George Pither	England	OF	1921–1922	7	0	
Ralph Shields	England	FW	1921–1922	9	1	
Phillip Allen	England	FB	1922–1923	3	0	
Peter Duncan	Scotland	IL	1922–1923	13	2	
John Haggan	England	WH	1922–1923	21	1	
Sidney Mulford	England	IF	1922–1924	24	4	
Harry Stott	England	OF	1922–1923	24	0	
Edmund Wright	England	GK	1922	6	0	
Bert Gower	England	FB	1923	2	0	
Bobby Hughes	England	OF	1923–1924	17	7	
Henry Parkinson	England	CF	1923–1924	7	2	
John Thain	England	OR	1923	5	1	
Billy Broadbent	England	U	1924–1925	18	0	
Tommy Cain	England	WH	1924–1925	12	0	
Edwin Cooke	England	FB	1924	4	0	
Albert Gilbert	England	GK	1924–1925	11	0	
Frank Henderson	England	LH	1924	8	0	
Harold Hughes	Wales	OF	1924–1925	14	1	
Charles McGuigan	England	OF	1924	2	0	
William Relph	England	OF	1924	8	1	
Ronald Rowe	England	WH	1924–1925	8	0	
Vivian Rowe	England	IF	1924–1925	4	1	
Edward Shepherd	England	FB	1924	2	0	
Ralph Williams	Wales	CF	1924	7	1	
Evan Evans	Wales	WH	1925	8	0	
Bill Finlayson	Scotland	FW	1925–1926	22	5	
Arthur Isaac	Wales	IF	1925	2	1	
Jimmy McCree	Scotland	OF	1925	3	0	
Harry Stanford	England	GK	1925	2	0	
John Steel	Scotland	FB	1925	16	0	
Frank Watson	England	FW/OR	1925–1926	7	0	
George Anderson	Scotland	FW	1926–1927	8	2	
Joe Craddock	England	FW	1926–1928	24	11	
John Hodgson	England	FB	1926	4	0	
Joe Hodnett	England	HB	1926–1927	9	0	
Jack Price	England	FB	1926	12	0	
Charlie Reddock	Scotland	WH	1926–1930	9	0	
Archie Clark	England	HB	1927	1	0	
Arthur Collins	England	GK	1927	4	0	
Frank Marshall	Scotland	WH	1927	21	0	
Jim McCafferty	Scotland	OF	1927	1	0	
Samuel Ward	Scotland	CH	1927–1928	7	0	
Joe Wiggins	England	CF	1927–1928	4	2	
John Cairns	Scotland	FW	1928	1	1	
George Dumbrell	England	FB	1928–1930; 1935–1937	17	0	
Andy Durnion	Scotland	FW	1928	2	1	
Andrew Heeps	Scotland	CH	1928	2	0	
Dick Hendrie	Scotland	FB	1928	1	0	
Charles McKinley	England	OF	1928–1929	15	1	
William Price	England	IF	1928	1	1	
Albert Purdy	England	FB	1928	1	0	
Albert Richards	England	CF	1928	2	0	
Martin Woosnam	Wales	CH	1928	1	0	(Note: Capped by Wales at amateur level.)
Bill Caesar	England	CH	1929	1	0	
Frederick Gamble	England	CF	1929–1931	13	5	
Norman Stone	England	CF	1929	4	2	
Percy Whipp	Scotland	IF	1929	7	1	
Alexander Wood	Scotland	IF	1929	1	0	
Bill Bann	Scotland	FB	1930–1932	7	0	
Frank McDonough	England	GK	1930	2	0	
Les Roberts	England	IF	1930–1931	5	0	
Ralph Allen	England	CF	1931–1934	13	4	
George Cook	England	FW	1931–1932	15	3	
James Shaw	England	IF	1931	1	0	
Norman Thomson	Scotland	IF	1931	1	0	
Les Wilkins	Wales	IF/WH	1931–1932	23	1	
Jack French	England	RB	1932	5	0	
Vivian Gibbins	England	FW	1932	8	5	(Note: Capped by England at amateur level.)
Bert Stephens	England	IF	1932–1933	6	1	
George Weeks	England	WH	1932	8	0	
Jack Clough	England	GK	1933–1934	21	0	
Joe McClure	England	WH	1933	1	0	
William Smith	England	WH	1933	1	0	
Charlie Walsh	England	IF	1933	10	3	
Alf Wheeler	England	IF	1933	1	0	
Walter Metcalf	England	LB	1934–1937	7	0	
Archie Scott	Scotland	CB	1934–1937	6	0	
Cecil Smith	England	LH	1934–1936	3	0	
Jim Brown	United States	IF	1935	1	0	
Billy Dunn	Scotland	CF	1935–1936	3	1	
James Raven	England	RH	1935	1	0	
James Nicholls	England	GK	1936–1937	7	0	
Vic Aicken	Ireland	RH	1937–1939	3	0	
Joe Murray	Scotland	WH	1937	1	0	
Sam Briddon	England	RH	1938–1939	7	0	
Maurice Edelston	England	IF	1938–1939	21	6	
Doug Anderson	Scotland	LB	1939	1	0	
Jimmy Anderson	England	LB	1939–1946	3	0	
Les Boulter	Wales	IL	1939	19	2	
Tommy Cheetham	England	CF	1939	19	8	
Harry Oliver	England	FB	1939–1948	20	0	
Percy Saunders	England	IF	1939	2	1	

=== Post-war era (1945–2000) ===
Name	Nationality	Position	Brentford career	Appearances	Goals	Notes
Harry Bamford	England	FB	1946	2	0	
Fred Durrant	England	CF	1946	10	7	
John Gillies	Scotland	OL	1946	5	0	
Jim Gotts	England	OF	1946	2	0	
Eric Jones	England	WH	1946	4	0	
Maurice Roberts	England	OL	1946	10	0	
Arthur Shaw	England	WH	1946–1947	4	0	
Alan Smith	England	OL	1946–1949	17	3	
Bob Thomas	England	IF	1946	8	1	
Cyril Toulouse	England	WH	1946–1947	13	0	
Bill Whittaker	England	WH	1946	4	0	(Note: On loan from Charlton Athletic.)
Tommy Dougall	Scotland	OF	1947	2	0	
José Gallego	Spain	OL	1947	6	0	
Percy Gleeson	England	IF	1947	9	1	
John Moore	England	WH	1947	4	0	
Bill Naylor	England	IF	1947	11	2	
Eric Ventom	England	FB	1947	1	0	
Paddy Harris	Republic of Ireland	WH/IF	1948	4	0	
Doug Keene	England	OF	1948–1950	13	1	
Viv Woodward	Wales	IF	1948–1949	20	4	
Jimmy Anders	England	OF	1949–1950	13	0	
Kevin O'Flanagan	Republic of Ireland	OF	1949–1950	7	0	(Note: Capped by Republic of Ireland at amateur level.)
Dennis Rampling	England	OR	1949	1	0	
Peter Broadbent	England	IR	1950–1951	16	2	
Tom Garneys	England	CF	1950	12	2	
Bill Pointon	England	IF	1950	16	2	
Tommy Sinclair	England	OF	1950–1951	17	5	
Tecwyn Jones	Wales	FB	1951–1953	5	0	
Bernard Kelly	England	OF	1951	1	1	
Jimmy Bowie	Scotland	FW	1952	9	0	
Jimmy D'Arcy	Northern Ireland	IF	1952–1953	13	3	(Note: Represented the IFA XI.)
Verdi Godwin	England	FW	1952–1953	7	1	
Frank Morrad	England	U	1952–1953	6	2	
Bill Slater	England	WH	1952; 1963	13	3	(Note: Represented Great Britain in at the 1952 Summer Olympics.)
Vernon Avis	England	FB	1953–1960	19	0	
Frank Broome	England	OF	1953	6	1	
Micky Bull	England	OF	1953	3	0	
Ian McPherson	Scotland	OF	1953	4	0	
Gerry Gazzard	England	IF	1954	13	6	(Note: On loan from West Ham United.)
Leonard Geard	England	WH	1955–1956	4	0	
Roy Hart	England	CH	1955	2	0	
John Pearson	England	IF	1955–1957	5	0	
Len Roe	England	WH	1955–1956	8	0	
Billy Bloomfield	England	IL	1957	2	0	
John Caven	Scotland	FW	1957–1958	7	1	
Christy Fletcher	Republic of Ireland	FW	1957	2	0	
Billy Horn	Scotland	OF	1958	1	0	
Bill Livingstone	Scotland	FB	1959–1960	21	0	
Charlie McInally	Scotland	WH	1959	1	0	
Terry Curran	England	IF	1960–1961	5	0	
Danny O'Donnell	Scotland	IF	1961–1962	11	0	
Ray Reeves	England	FB	1961	5	0	
Hugh McLaughlin	Scotland	WH	1963–1965	7	1	
Hamish MacKenzie	Scotland	FB	1964–1967	23	0	
Tim Soutar	England	IF	1964	1	0	
Ron Crisp	England	U	1965–1966	22	1	
Barry Thornley	England	OL/LB	1965–1966	7	0	
Phil Basey	Wales	OF	1966	2	0	
Brian Bedford	Wales	CF	1966–1967	22	10	
Brian Etheridge	England	IF	1966–1967	24	2	
Michael Ogburn	England	FB	1966	13	0	
John Regan	England	CF	1966	14	5	
Dennis Edwards	England	IF	1967	11	2	(Note: On loan from Portsmouth.)
Cliff Myers	England	IF	1967	15	3	
John South	England	CF	1967	2	0	
Ron Still	Scotland	CF	1967	1	0	
Bobby Wilson	England	IF	1967	1	1	
Brian Caterer	England	CH	1968	1	0	
Peter Deakin	England	IF	1968	10	3	
Denis Hunt	England	FB	1968–1969	14	0	
George Kirby	England	CF	1968	5	1	
Ron Willis	England	GK	1968	1	0	
Gerry Baker	United States	CF	1969–1970	8	2	(Note: On loan from Coventry City.)
Bill Brown	England	CF	1969	4	0	
Micky Cook	England	CF	1969–1970	24	4	
Ron Foster	England	IF	1969	4	0	
Roger Frude	England	IF	1969	4	0	
David Harney	England	CF	1969	1	0	
Alan Cocks	England	CF	1970	11	2	(Note: On loan from Chelsea.)
Alex Dawson	Scotland	CF	1970	11	7	(Note: On loan from Brighton & Hove Albion.)
Michael Maskell	England	FB	1970	1	0	
Brian Tawse	Scotland	OF	1970–1971	22	1	
Trevor Dawkins	England	MF	1971	4	0	(Note: On loan from Crystal Palace.)
Mick Heath	England	IF	1971	1	0	
Steven Tom	England	DF/MF	1971–1972	21	1	
Ken Wallace	England	FW	1971	3	0	
David Court	England	MF	1972	13	1	
Kevin Harding	England	DF	1972–1975	8	0	
David Jenkins	England	FW	1972–1973	18	1	
Richard Poole	England	FW	1972–1976	21	1	
Kieron Baker	England	GK	1973	6	0	(Note: On loan from Bournemouth.)
Michael Brown	Wales	CB	1973	3	0	
Roy Cotton	England	FW	1973–1974	2	0	
Hughie Reed	Scotland	W	1973	4	0	(Note: On loan from Plymouth Argyle.)
Gary Smith	England	CB	1973–1975	3	0	
Gary Towse	England	GK	1973	5	0	
Willie Brown	Scotland	CF	1974–1975	17	9	
Ian Filby	England	W	1974	3	0	(Note: On loan from Leyton Orient.)
Jimmy Gabriel	Scotland	WH	1974	9	0	
Graham Smith	England	MF	1974–1975	17	0	
Billy Stagg	England	FW	1974	4	0	
Graham Cox	England	GK	1975–1978	4	2	
Bill Glazier	England	GK	1975–1976	12	0	
Graham Horn	England	GK	1975	3	0	(Note: On loan from Arsenal.)
Steve Aylott	England	MF	1976–1978	7	0	
Bobby Goldthorpe	England	CB	1976–1977	23	2	
Keith Pritchett	Scotland	FB	1976	13	1	
Harry Redknapp	England	W	1976	1	0	
Gary Rolph	England	FW	1976–1979	14	1	
Steve Scrivens	England	W	1976	5	0	(Note: On loan from Fulham.)
Tom Sharp	Scotland	DF	1976–1977	17	1	
John Bain	Scotland	MF	1977	18	1	(Note: On loan from Bristol City.)
Tommy Baldwin	England	FW	1977–1978	4	1	
Tony Burns	England	GK	1977	6	0	
Terry Glynn	England	FW	1977	1	0	
Billy Eames	England	FW	1978	2	1	
Lee Frost	England	W	1978; 1980–1981	21	3	(Note: Joined on loan from Chelsea in October 1978 and returned to sign permanently in December 1980.)
Billy Holmes	England	FW	1978–1980	15	2	
John Murray	England	W	1978	5	1	
Trevor Porter	England	GK	1978–1980	17	0	
David Silman	England	DF	1978–1979	1	0	
Stephen Wilkins	England	MF	1978	1	0	
Keith Fear	England	FW	1979	8	2	
Iori Jenkins	Wales	DF	1979–1981	17	1	
Steve Harding	England	CB	1980	4	0	(Note: On loan from Bristol Rovers.)
Paul McCullough	England	GK	1980–1981	9	0	
Noel Parkinson	England	MF	1980	10	0	(Note: On loan from Ipswich Town.)
Barry Silkman	England	MF	1980	16	1	
Robbie Johnson	England	LB	1981–1982	2	0	
Kevin Teer	England	MF	1981	1	0	
Petar Borota	Yugoslavia	GK	1982	3	0	
David Kemp	England	FW	1982	3	1	
Tony Spencer	England	LB	1982–1984	22	0	
Les Strong	England	FB	1982	5	0	
Keith Tonge	England	MF	1982	1	0	
Ian Bolton	England	CB	1983–1984	17	1	
Ian Davies	England	LB	1983	2	0	(Note: On loan from Manchester City.)
Bill Garner	England	FW	1983	3	1	
Jimmy Holmes	Republic of Ireland	FB	1983	4	0	
Andy Rollings	England	CB	1983	1	0	
Steve Butler	England	FW	1984–1986	23	3	
Tommy Finney	Northern Ireland	W	1984	24	2	
Nigel Gray	England	CB	1984	17	1	(Note: On loan from Swindon Town.)
Richard Key	England	GK	1984; 1986	5	0	
Bill Roffey	England	LB	1984	13	0	
Gary Cooper	England	MF	1985	10	0	(Note: On loan from Queens Park Rangers.)
Steve Burke	England	LW	1986	10	1	
Micky Droy	England	CB	1986–1987	24	3	
David Geddis	England	FW	1986	5	1	(Note: On loan from Birmingham City.)
Henry Hughton	Republic of Ireland	DF/MF	1986	11	0	
Tony Obi	England	W	1986	10	0	(Note: On loan from Oxford United.)
Paul Birch	England	FW	1987–1988	20	2	
Warren Gravette	England	FW	1987–1988	5	0	
Paul Merson	England	W	1987	9	0	
Lee Nogan	Wales	FW	1987	11	2	
John Power	England	GK	1987	2	0	(Note: On loan from Kingstonian.)
Sean Priddle	England	MF	1987–1988	6	0	
Philip Priest	England	MF	1987	5	1	
Graham Rix	England	MF	1987	6	0	
Paul Smith	England	RW	1987–1988	18	1	
Steve Thorne	England	MF	1987	2	1	
Paul Williams	England	FW	1987	8	6	
Les Ferdinand	England	FW	1988	3	0	
Matthew Howard	England	RB	1988	1	0	
Tony Oliver	England	GK	1988	11	0	
Graham Pearce	England	LB/SW	1988–1989	23	0	
Jeremy Roberts	England	GK	1988–1989	9	0	
John Smeulders	England	GK	1988	9	0	
Ian Stewart	Northern Ireland	LW	1988	7	0	
Andy Ansah	England	FW	1989–1990; 1994; 1995	21	5	(Note: Returned on loan from Southend United for separate spells in November 1994 and November 1995.)
Keith Branagan	Republic of Ireland	GK	1989	3	0	(Note: On loan from Millwall.)
Andy Driscoll	England	RW	1989–1992	14	2	
Kelly Haag	England	FW	1989–1990	7	0	
Paul Miller	England	CB	1989	4	0	
John Moncur	England	MF	1989	6	1	(Note: On loan from Tottenham Hotspur.)
Jon Purdie	England	LW	1989	6	0	
Ashley Bayes	England	GK	1990–1993	12	0	(Note: Capped by England at U18 level.)
Garry Brooke	England	RW	1990–1991	13	0	
Stuart Cash	England	LB	1990	14	0	(Note: On loan from Nottingham Forest.)
Colin Scott	Scotland	GK	1990	6	0	
Sean Sparham	England	DF	1990	5	1	
Jim Carstairs	Scotland	LB	1991	11	0	
Clive Goodyear	England	RB	1991	11	0	
Simon Line	England	RB	1991	1	0	
Perry Suckling	England	GK	1991	9	0	
Grant Chalmers	England	MF	1992–1993	16	1	
Tony Finnigan	England	MF	1992	4	0	
Murray Jones	England	FW	1992–1993	20	0	
Detsi Kruszyński	Poland	MF	1992–1993	16	0	
Gerry Peyton	Republic of Ireland	GK	1992; 1993	22	0	(Note: Joined on loan from Everton in September 1992 and returned to sign permanently in April 1993.)
Ian Benjamin	England	FW	1993–1994	19	2	
Alan Dickens	England	DM	1993	15	1	
Matthew Metcalf	England	FW	1993–1994	9	0	
Scott Morgan	England	LB	1993–1994	3	0	
Paul Mortimer	England	LB	1993	8	0	
Craig Ravenscroft	England	FW/RW	1993–1995	12	1	
Kenny Sansom	England	LB	1993	8	0	
Steve Tilson	England	LW	1993	2	0	(Note: On loan from Southend United.)
Dean A. Williams	England	FW	1993–1994	3	1	
Dean P. Williams	England	GK	1993–1994	7	0	
Darren Annon	England	DF/W	1994–1995	23	2	
John Cornwell	England	CM	1994	4	0	
Tamer Fernandes	England	GK	1994–1997	17	0	
Jon Hooker	England	FW/MF	1994–1995	8	0	
George Parris	England	MF	1994	7	1	
David Thompson	England	CB	1994	10	1	
Kevin Watson	England	MF	1994	3	0	
Dennis Bailey	England	FW	1995	6	3	
Paul Davis	England	MF	1995	8	0	
Andy Sussex	England	MF/FW	1995	3	0	
Kevin Dennis	England	LW	1996–1998	21	0	
David Greene	Republic of Ireland	CB	1996	11	0	(Note: On loan from Luton Town.)
Paul Barrowcliff	England	MF	1997	16	0	
Nick Colgan	Republic of Ireland	GK	1997	5	0	
Ryan Denys	England	RW/FW	1997–1998	24	0	
Nigel Gleghorn	England	MF	1997–1998	12	1	(Note: On loan from Burnley.)
Richard Goddard	England	MF	1997	3	0	
Gareth Hall	Wales	RB/MF	1997	6	0	(Note: On loan from Sunderland.)
Mark Janney	England	MF	1997	2	1	
Malcolm McPherson	Scotland	RB/RM	1997–1998	14	0	
Stuart Myall	England	MF/DF	1997	2	0	
Ricky Reina	England	FW	1997	10	2	
Steve Slade	England	FW	1997	4	0	
Simon Spencer	England	MF	1997	2	0	
Leon Townley	England	CB	1997–1998	21	3	
Simon Wormull	England	RM	1997–1998	8	0	
Micky Adams ♦	England	LB/LM	1998	1	0	
Steven Blaney	Wales	RB	1998	5	0	
Drewe Broughton	England	FW	1998	1	0	
Dean Clark	England	MF	1998	5	0	
Chris Coyne	Australia	CB	1998	7	0	
Danny Cullip	England	CB	1998	17	0	
Leo Fortune-West	England	FW	1998–1999	15	1	
Dirk Hebel	Germany	MF	1998	19	0	
Graeme Hogg	Scotland	CB	1998	17	2	
Mike Pollitt	England	GK	1998	5	0	(Note: On loan from Notts County.)
Niall Thompson	Canada	FW	1998	8	0	
Patrick Agyemang	Ghana	FW	1999–2000	13	0	(Note: On loan from Wimbledon.)
Julian Charles	Saint Vincent and the Grenadines	FW	1999–2001	12	0	
Neil Clement	England	LB	1999–2000	8	0	
Gareth Graham	Northern Ireland	MF/RB	1999–2001	14	0	(Note: Joined on loan from Crystal Palace in September 1999 and transferred permanently in October 1999.) (Note: Capped by Northern Ireland at U21 level.)
Stephen Jenkins	England	DF	1999	7	0	(Note: Joined on loan from Southampton in March 1999 and transferred permanently in June 1999.)
Richard Kennedy	Republic of Ireland	MF	1999–2000	12	0	
Phil Warner	England	RB/MF	1999–2000	16	0	(Note: On loan from Southampton.)

=== 21st century (2000–present) ===
Name	Nationality	Position	Brentford career	Appearances	Goals	Notes	Ref
Kevin Austin	Trinidad and Tobago	CB	2000	3	0	(Note: On loan from Barnsley.)	
Jason Crowe	England	RB	2000	11	0		
Gunnar Einarsson	Iceland	CM	2000	4	0	(Note: On loan from Roda JC Kerkrade.)	
Jimmy Glass	England	GK	2000	2	0		
Clement James	England	FW	2000	1	0		
Jean-Philippe Javary	France	MF	2000–2001	9	0		
Steve Jones	England	FW	2000	10	0		
Simon Marsh	England	LB	2000	6	0		
Nevin Saroya	England	MF	2000	1	0		
Adrian Caceres	Australia	LM	2001	5	0		
Jason Price	Wales	RM/RB	2001	18	1		
Lloyd Blackman	England	FW	2002–2003	5	0		
Ben Chorley	England	CB	2002	3	0		
Leon Constantine	England	FW	2002–2003	19	0		
Stephen Hughes	England	FW	2002–2004	18	0		
Alan Julian	Northern Ireland	GK	2002–2004	19	0		
Mark Peters	England	FW	2002–2004	24	1		
Danny Allen-Page	England	RB	2003	1	0		
Mickaël Antoine-Curier	Guadeloupe	FW	2003	11	3		
Peter Beadle	England	FW	2003	1	0		
Lee Fieldwick	England	LB	2003	12	0		
Jide Olugbodi	Nigeria	FW	2003	5	0		
Bobby Traynor	England	RM	2003	3	0		
Dean Wells	England	DF	2003	1	0		
Ronnie Bull	England	LB	2004	20	0		
Steve Claridge	England	FW	2004–2005	4	0		
Scott Fitzgerald ♦	Republic of Ireland	CB	2004–2005	24	0	(Note: Joined on loan from Colchester United in March 2004 and transferred permanently in June 2004.)	
Sean Hillier	England	DF	2004	1	0		
Jamie Lawrence	Jamaica	CM	2004–2005	19	0		
Josh Lennie	England	GK	2004	1	0		
Luke Muldowney	England	MF	2004	1	0		
Andy Myers	England	LB	2004–2005	13	0		
Richard Pacquette	Dominica	FW	2004	1	0		
Jamie Palmer	England	RB	2004	1	0		
Scott Weight	England	MF	2004	1	0		
Ademola Bankole	Nigeria	GK	2005–2006	7	0		
Joe Keenan	England	MF	2005	4	0		
Junior Lewis	England	CM	2005–2006	15	0		
George Moleski	England	RW	2005	2	0		
Ólafur Ingi Skúlason	Iceland	LW	2005–2006	15	1		
Jerrome Sobers	England	W	2005	1	1		
Aaron Steele	England	DF	2005	1	0		
Ryan Watts	England	LB/LM	2005	3	0		
Nathan Abbey	England	GK	2006–2007	16	0		
Karle Carder-Andrews	England	MF	2006–2007	6	0		
Simon Cox	Republic of Ireland	FW	2006; 2006–2007	14	0	(Note: On loan from Reading.)	
Jamie England	England	MF	2006	1	0		
Clark Masters	England	GK	2006–2007	16	0		
Chris Moore	Wales	FW	2006	20	2		
Fola Onibuje	Nigeria	FW	2006	3	0		
Jamie Smith	England	MF	2006	9	0		
Gavin Tomlin	England	FW/W	2006	15	0		
Clyde Wijnhard	Netherlands	FW	2006	12	0		
Grant Basey	Wales	LB	2007	10	0		
Lewis Dark	England	CM/RB	2007	3	0		
Lewis Emanuel	England	LB/LW	2007	3	0		
Joe Keith	England	MF	2007	18	2		
Michael Leary	England	MF	2007	17	0		
John Mackie (c)	England	CB	2007	16	0		
Ross Montague	England	FW	2007–2008	16	1		
Sammy Moore	England	MF	2007–2008	24	2		
David Partridge	Wales	DF	2007	3	0	(Note: Joined on loan from Bristol City in January 2007 and returned to sign permanently in December 2007.)	
Adrian Pettigrew	England	CB	2007	14	0		
Garry Richards	England	DF	2007	10	1	(Note: On loan from Colchester United.)	
Neil Shipperley	England	FW	2007	11	0		
Emile Sinclair	England	FW	2007	4	0		
Ben Starosta	Poland	RB/MF	2007	23	0	(Note: On loan from Sheffield United.)	
Scott Taylor	England	FW	2007	6	0	(Note: On loan from Milton Keynes Dons.)	
Lee Thorpe	England	FW	2007–2008	21	4		
Che Wilson	England	FB	2007	3	0		
Moses Ademola	England	FW/W	2008–2009	11	0		
Mikkel Andersen	Denmark	GK	2008	1	0		
Lloyd Anderson	England	GK	2008	1	0		
Frankie Artus	England	CM	2008	2	0		
Dean Bowditch	England	FW	2008–2009	9	2		
Wayne Brown	England	MF	2008	11	1		
John Halls	England	MF	2008–2009	24	0		
Brett Johnson	England	CB/LB	2008–2009	12	0		
Robert Milsom	England	LB/MF	2008	6	0		
Lewis Ochoa	England	MF	2008	1	0		
Eric Odhiambo	England	FW	2008	1	0	(Note: On loan from Leicester City.)	
Jordan Parkes	England	FB	2008	1	0	(Note: On loan from Watford.)	
Reuben Reid	England	FW	2008	10	1		
Osei Sankofa	England	DF	2008	11	0		
Damian Scannell	England	FW/W	2008	2	0		
Craig Stone	England	MF	2008	6	0	(Note: On loan from Gillingham.)	
Josh Wright	England	MF	2008	6	0		
John Bostock	England	MF/W	2009–2010	10	2		
Nikki Bull	England	GK	2009–2010	7	0		
Billy Clarke	Republic of Ireland	FW	2009	8	5		
Steve Kabba	England	FW	2009	12	0		
Rhys Murphy	Republic of Ireland	FW	2009	6	0		
Lewis Price	Wales	GK	2009–2010	18	0	(Note: On loan from Derby County.)	
Jordan Rhodes	Scotland	FW	2009	14	7		
Damian Spencer	England	FW	2009	5	1	(Note: On loan from Cheltenham Town.)	
Cleveland Taylor	Jamaica	RW	2009	15	1		
Sam Williams	England	FW	2009	11	2	(Note: On loan from Aston Villa.)	
Nicky Adams	Wales	MF	2010	10	0		
Lionel Ainsworth	England	RW	2010	9	0	(Note: On loan from Huddersfield Town.)	
John Akinde	England	FW	2010	2	0		
Ryan Blake	Northern Ireland	LB	2010	1	0		
Kirk Hudson	England	FW/W	2010	4	0		
Alex McCarthy *	England	GK	2010	3	0		
David McCracken	Scotland	CB	2010	3	0		
Tommy Smith	New Zealand	CB	2010	8	0		
Stephen Wright	England	RB	2010–2011	14	0		
Blair Adams	England	LB	2011	9	1		
Dale Bennett	England	LM	2011–2012	5	1		
Nicholas Bignall	England	FW	2011	7	0		
Nathan Byrne *	England	FB/W	2011	11	0		
Trevor Carson	Northern Ireland	GK	2011	1	0		
David Clarkson	Scotland	FW	2011	5	1		
Marcel Eger	Germany	CB	2011–2012	22	0		
Mike Grella	United States	FW	2011–2012	17	4		
Marc Laird	Scotland	MF	2011	5	1		
Miguel Llera	Spain	CB	2011	14	0	(Note: On loan from Blackpool.)	
Robbie Neilson	Scotland	FB	2011	16	0		
Luke Norris	England	FW	2011–2013	4	1		
Manny Oyeleke	England	CM/RB	2011–2013	3	0		
Adam Reed	Philippines	W	2011	12	0		
Simon Royce	England	GK	2011	1	0		
Jeffrey Schlupp	Ghana	FW	2011	10	6		
Adam Thompson	Northern Ireland	CB	2011; 2012	22	1		
Owain Tudur Jones	Wales	DM	2011	6	0	(Note: On loan from Norwich City.)	
Scott Barron	England	LB/LM	2012–2013	22	0		
Saido Berahino	Burundi	FW	2012	8	4	(Note: On loan from West Bromwich Albion.)	
Ryan Fredericks	England	DF/MF	2012	5	0		
Antonio German	Grenada	FW/W	2012–2013	7	1		
Antoine Gounet	France	GK	2012	1	0		
Lee Hodson	Northern Ireland	RB	2012–2013	18	0		
Rob Kiernan	Republic of Ireland	CB	2012–2013	9	0	(Note: On loan from Wigan Athletic.)	
Clinton Morrison	Republic of Ireland	FW	2012	8	0	(Note: On loan from Sheffield Wednesday.)	
Aaron Pierre	Grenada	CB	2012–2013	3	0		
Jimmy Spencer	England	FW	2012	2	0		
Charlie Adams *	England	CM	2013–2014	4	0		
Jack Bonham *	Republic of Ireland	GK	2013–2017	7	0		
Raphaël Calvet	France	CB	2013	1	0	(Note: Capped by France at U20 level.)	
Martin Fillo	Czech Republic	RW	2013	9	1	(Note: On loan from Viktoria Plzeň.)	
Kadeem Harris *	England	W	2013	11	2	(Note: On loan from Cardiff City.)	
Alfie Mawson	England	CB	2013	1	0		
Conor McAleny	England	FW	2013	4	0	(Note: On loan from Everton.)	
Liam Moore	Jamaica	CB	2013; 2015	10	0		
Ben Nugent	England	CB	2013	5	2		
Martin Taylor	England	FB	2013	6	2		
João Carlos Teixeira *	Portugal	MF	2013	2	0	(Note: On loan from Liverpool.)	
Javi Venta	Spain	RB	2013	4	1		
Bradley Wright-Phillips	England	FW	2013	17	5		
Chuba Akpom *	England	FW	2014	4	0		
Betinho	Portugal	FW	2014	1	0	(Note: On loan from Sporting CP.)	
Montell Moore	England	MF	2014	1	1		
Nick Proschwitz	Germany	FW	2014	20	2		
Marcos Tébar	Spain	DM	2014	6	0		
Marco Djuricin	Austria	FW	2015–2016	23	4	(Note: On loan from Red Bull Salzburg.)	
Akaki Gogia	Germany	MF	2015–2016	14	0		
Josh Laurent *	England	MF	2015	1	0		
Chris Long	England	FW	2015	11	4		
Jack O'Connell	England	CB/LB	2015–2016	19	1		
Courtney Senior	England	AM	2015	1	0		
Jermaine Udumaga	England	FW	2015	4	0		
Ryan Williams *	England	CM	2015	1	0		
Callum Elder *	Australia	LB	2016	6	0		
Tom Field *	Republic of Ireland	LB	2016–2019	21	3	(Note: Capped by Republic of Ireland at U16 level.)	
Jan Holldack	Germany	RB	2016	1	0		
Sullay Kaikai *	Sierra Leone	W	2016	18	3		
Emmanuel Ledesma	Argentina	AM	2016	2	0		
Leandro Rodríguez	Uruguay	FW	2016	2	0		
Justin Shaibu	Denmark	FW	2016–2017	10	1	(Note: Capped by Denmark at U20 level.)	
Theo Archibald *	Scotland	RW	2017	3	0	(Note: Capped by Scotland at U21 level.)	
Ilias Chatzitheodoridis *	Greece	LB	2017–2018	4	0		
Reece Cole *	England	CM	2017	1	0		
Zain Westbrooke	England	CM	2017	1	0		
Chiedozie Ogbene *	Republic of Ireland	W	2018–2019	9	0		
Patrik Gunnarsson *	Iceland	GK	2019	1	0	(Note: Capped by Iceland at U21 level.)	
Nikos Karelis	Greece	FW	2019	4	0		
Nikolaj Kirk	Denmark	RB	2019	1	0	(Note: On loan from FC Midtjylland.)	
Jaakko Oksanen *	Finland	MF	2019–2020	3	0	(Note: Capped by Finland at U21 level.)	
Luka Racic *	Denmark	CB	2019–2020	9	1	(Note: Capped by Denmark at U21 level.)	
Dominic Thompson *	England	LB	2019–2022	19	0		
Joel Valencia	Ecuador	W	2019–2020	24	1		
Dru Yearwood *	England	MF	2019–2020	5	0		
Halil Dervişoğlu *	Turkey	FW	2020–2022	12	1	(Note: Capped by Turkey at U21 level.)	
Charlie Goode *	England	CB	2020–2021	20	0		
Fredrik Hammar *	Sweden	CM	2020	1	0	(Note: Capped by Sweden at U19 level.)	
Max Haygarth	England	W	2020–2021	3	0	(Note: Joined on loan from Manchester United in October 2020 and transferred permanently in January 2021.)	
Aaron Pressley *	Scotland	FW	2020–2021	3	0		
Fin Stevens *	Wales	RB	2020–2022	10	0	(Note: Capped by Wales at U21 level.)	
Mads Bidstrup *	Denmark	DM	2021–2022	14	0		
Álvaro Fernández *	Spain	GK	2021–2022	14	0	(Note: On loan from Huesca.)	
Alex Gilbert *	Republic of Ireland	AM	2021	2	0	(Note: Capped by Republic of Ireland at U21 level.)	
Lewis Gordon *	Scotland	LB	2021	1	0		
Myles Peart-Harris *	England	AM	2021–2026	9	0		
Winston Reid	New Zealand	CB	2021	12	0		
Christian Eriksen	Denmark	AM	2022	11	1		
Jonas Lössl	Denmark	GK	2022	3	0		
Thomas Strakosha *	Albania	GK	2022–2024	6	0		
Ryan Trevitt *	England	MF	2022–2024	5	0		
Nathan Young-Coombes	England	FW	2022	1	0		
Ellery Balcombe ‡	England	GK	2023–	2	0	(Note: Capped by England at U20 level.)	
Ethan Brierley *	England	MF	2023	1	0		
Michael Olakigbe ‡	England	LW	2023–	12	0		
Kim Ji-soo ‡	South Korea	CB	2024–	5	0	(Note: Capped by South Korea at U23 level.)	
Yunus Emre Konak ‡	Turkey	DM	2024–	13	0		
Paris Maghoma *	England	CM	2024–2025	10	0		
Jayden Meghoma ‡	England	LB	2024–	4	0		
Sergio Reguilón *	Spain	LB	2024	16	0		
Hákon Valdimarsson ‡	Iceland	GK	2024–	13	0		
Tony Yogane *	England	LW	2024	1	0		
Benjamin Arthur ‡	England	CB	2025–	3	0	(Note: Capped by England at U19 level.)	
Romelle Donovan ‡	England	AM	2025–	9	0	(Note: Joined on loan from Birmingham City in January 2025 and transferred permanently in June 2025.)	
Antoni Milambo ‡	Netherlands	AM	2025–	3	0	(Note: Capped by Netherlands at U21 level.)	
Reiss Nelson *	England	LW	2025–2026	14	1		
Gustavo Nunes ‡	Brazil	LW	2025–	5	0	(Note: Capped by Brazil at U20 level.)	
Jaidon Anthony ‡	England	LW	2026–	7	1		
Luka Bentt ‡	Belgium	MF	2026–	1	0	(Note: Capped by Belgium at U19 level.)	
El Hadji Malick Diouf ‡	Senegal	LB	2026–	3	0		
Kaye Furo ‡	Belgium	FW	2026–	3	0		
Mamadou Sangaré ‡	Mali	MF	2026–	7	0		
Jannik Schuster ‡	Austria	CB	2026–	5	0	(Note: Capped by Austria at U21 level.)	
Callum Wilson ‡	England	FW	2026–	5	2		
