= Jeremy Roberts =

Jeremy Roberts may refer to:

- Jeremy Roberts (footballer), English footballer
- Jeremy Dale Roberts, English composer and teacher
- Jeremy Roberts (politician), Canadian politician
