= 1924–25 Brentford F.C. season =

English football team season

Brentford
1924–25 season
- Chairman: H. Jason-Saunders
- Manager: Archie Mitchell (until 2 December 1924); Fred Halliday (from 3 December 1924)
- Stadium: Griffin Park
- Third Division South: 21st
- FA Cup: Fifth qualifying round
- Top goalscorer: League: Allen (14); All: Allen (14)
- Highest home attendance: 11,000
- Lowest home attendance: 3,000
- Average home league attendance: 7,010
Home colours

During the 1924–25 English football season, Brentford competed in the Football League Third Division South. After finishing in 21st place, the club successfully applied for re-election. The 41 goals scored during the season is the fewest in club history.

== Season summary ==
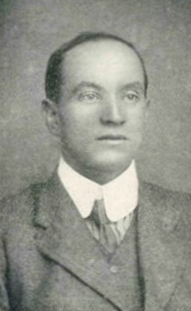
Fred Halliday took over as Brentford manager for the fourth and final time in December 1924.

Brentford manager Archie Mitchell conducted an overhaul of his half back and forward lines during the 1924 off-season, releasing James Kerr, Freddy Capper, Bobby Hughes, Sidney Mulford and Henry Parkinson and signing 12 new players, which included new forward Jack Allen to partner Reginald Parker in attack. Aside from a three-match winning streak in September, which lifted the club as high as 9th, 10 defeats in the following 12 games saw Mitchell step down as manager after a 5–3 defeat to Isthmian League club St Albans City in the FA Cup fifth qualifying round on 29 November 1924. He was replaced by Fred Halliday, who stepped up from an administrative role to take over as Brentford manager for the third time.

At the time of Halliday's first match in charge, Brentford had been rooted to the bottom of the Third Division South for nearly a month. Halliday fared little better than his predecessor, despite a 10-match spell from mid-December to early February which saw the Bees lose just three times. Mid-season signings Jimmy McCree, Bert Young and new captain Alex Graham failed to strengthen the team, though four goals in 9 late-season appearances from new acquisition Jack Lane at least inspired the team to score 12 goals in the matches in which he played.

Brentford finished the 1924–25 season in 21st place and successfully applied for re-election to the Football League. Though statistically it was not Brentford's worst season, many Football League club records were set or equalled during the campaign, including fewest away victories (1), fewest victories (9), fewest draws (0), consecutive home draws (4), most away defeats (20), most defeats (26), fewest away goals scored (10), fewest goals scored (38) and most away goals conceded (65). A 7–0 defeat to Swansea Town on 8 November 1924 is Brentford's joint-worst league defeat and together with a 7–1 defeat to Plymouth Argyle on 6 September 1924, is a joint-club record for most goals conceded in an away league loss.

== League table ==
Pos	Team	Pld	W	D	L	GF	GA	GAv	Pts	Qualification
18	Aberdare Athletic	42	14	9	19	54	67	0.806	37	
19	Queens Park Rangers	42	14	8	20	42	63	0.667	36	
20	Bournemouth & Boscombe Athletic	42	13	8	21	40	58	0.690	34	
21	Brentford	42	9	7	26	38	91	0.418	25	Re-elected
22	Merthyr Town	42	8	5	29	35	77	0.455	21	Re-elected

== Results ==
Brentford's goal tally listed first.

=== Legend ===
Win	Draw	Loss

=== Football League Third Division South ===
No.	Date	Opponent	Venue	Result	Attendance	Scorer(s)
1	30 August 1924	Brighton & Hove Albion	H	2–4	8,500	Garnish, Parker
2	3 September 1924	Gillingham	A	0–1	5,000	
3	6 September 1924	Plymouth Argyle	A	1–7	9,000	Parker
4	8 September 1924	Gillingham	H	2–1	6,000	Parker, Allen
5	13 September 1924	Bristol City	H	1–0	9,000	Allen
6	15 September 1924	Newport County	H	2–0	7,000	Parker (2)
7	20 September 1924	Swindon Town	A	0–2	4,000	
8	27 September 1924	Aberdare Athletic	H	2–2	9,000	Parker, H. Williams
9	4 October 1924	Norwich City	A	0–3	6,000	
10	11 October 1924	Queens Park Rangers	H	0–1	8,000	
11	18 October 1924	Millwall	H	1–0	11,000	R. Williams
12	22 October 1924	Bournemouth & Boscombe Athletic	A	0–2	6,000	
13	25 October 1924	Merthyr Town	A	0–4	5,000	
14	1 November 1924	Reading	H	0–1	2,500	
15	8 November 1924	Swansea Town	A	0–7	5,000	
16	15 November 1924	Exeter City	H	2–5	2,500	Garnish, Parker
17	22 November 1924	Bristol Rovers	A	0–2	5,000	
18	6 December 1924	Southend United	A	1–6	4,000	Relph
19	13 December 1924	Watford	H	0–0	4,000	
20	20 December 1924	Northampton Town	A	2–0	6,000	Allen (2)
21	25 December 1924	Charlton Athletic	A	0–3	7,000	
22	26 December 1924	Charlton Athletic	H	1–0	10,000	Allen
23	27 December 1924	Brighton & Hove Albion	A	1–4	2,500	Parker
24	3 January 1925	Plymouth Argyle	H	1–0	8,000	Graham (pen)
25	10 January 1925	Southend United	H	2–2	7,000	Garnish, V. Rowe
26	17 January 1925	Bristol City	A	0–3	8,500	
27	24 January 1925	Swindon Town	H	0–0	7,000	
28	7 February 1925	Norwich City	H	1–1	7,000	Allen
29	14 February 1925	Queens Park Rangers	A	0–1	10,000	
30	16 February 1925	Aberdare Athletic	A	1–2	3,000	Hughes
31	21 February 1925	Millwall	A	0–3	14,000	
32	28 February 1925	Merthyr Town	H	2–2	7,000	Isaac, H. Williams
33	7 March 1925	Reading	A	1–3	6,312	Allen
34	14 March 1925	Swansea Town	H	3–1	9,000	Allen (2), Lane
35	21 March 1925	Exeter City	A	1–5	3,000	Lane
36	28 March 1925	Bristol Rovers	H	1–1	4,000	Allen
37	4 April 1925	Newport County	A	0–1	5,000	
38	10 April 1925	Luton Town	H	3–0	7,000	Allen (2), Lane
39	13 April 1925	Luton Town	A	1–3	6,000	Garnish
40	18 April 1925	Watford	A	1–3	4,000	Allen
41	25 April 1925	Northampton Town	H	1–3	5,000	Lane
42	2 May 1925	Bournemouth & Boscombe Athletic	H	1–2	4,000	Allen

=== FA Cup ===
Round	Date	Opponent	Venue	Result	Attendance	Scorer(s)
5QR	29 November 1924	St Albans City	A	3–5	8,825	Parker, H. Williams, Garnish

- Sources: Statto, 100 Years of Brentford, The Complete History

== Playing squad ==
Players' ages are as of the opening day of the 1924–25 season.

Pos.	Name	Nat.	Date of birth (age)	Signed from	Signed in	Notes
Goalkeepers
GK	Albert Gilbert	(England)	9 February 1892 (aged 32)	Civil Service	1924	
GK	William Young	(England)	4 August 1892 (aged 32)	South Shields	1920	
Defenders
DF	Charles Alton	(England)	24 December 1891 (aged 32)	Rotherham County	1921	
DF	Edwin Cooke	(England)	26 February 1903 (aged 21)	Barnsley	1924	
DF	George Kell	(England)	13 July 1896 (aged 28)	The Wednesday	1922	
DF	Edward Shepherd	(England)	18 May 1903 (aged 21)	Harrow Weald	1924	
DF	John Steel	(Scotland)	1895 (aged 28–29)	Arsenal	1925	
Midfielders
HB	Billy Broadbent	(England)	20 November 1901 (aged 22)	Oldham Athletic	1924	
HB	Tommy Cain	(England)	10 November 1892 (aged 31)	Sheppey United	1924	
HB	Alex Graham (c)	(Scotland)	11 July 1889 (aged 35)	Arsenal	1924	
HB	Frank Henderson	(England)	24 September 1900 (aged 23)	Stockport County	1924	
HB	Bill Inglis	(England)	4 September 1899 (aged 24)	Derby County	1922	
HB	Gordon Johnstone	(England)	21 April 1900 (aged 24)	Houghton Rovers	1922	
HB	Horace Jones	(England)	n/a	Ton Pentre	1922	
HB	Ronald Rowe	(England)	11 October 1902 (aged 21)	Wimbledon	1924	Amateur
HB	Jimmy Walton	(England)	3 November 1898 (aged 25)	Bristol Rovers	1924	
Forwards
FW	Jack Allen	(England)	31 January 1903 (aged 21)	Leeds United	1924	
FW	Billy Clayson	(England)	12 July 1897 (aged 27)	Wellingborough Town	1922	
FW	Tom Garnish	(England)	3 May 1900 (aged 24)	Wandsworth	1923	
FW	Harold Hughes	(Wales)	1902 (aged 21–22)	Aberdare Athletic	1924	
FW	Arthur Isaac	(England)	1898 (aged 25–26)	Cambridge Town	1923	Amateur
FW	Jack Lane	(England)	29 May 1898 (aged 26)	Chesterfield	1925	
FW	Jimmy McCree	(Scotland)	16 November 1902 (aged 21)	London Caledonians	1925	Amateur
FW	Charles McGuigan	(England)	13 December 1900 (aged 23)	Newcastle United	1924	
FW	Reginald Parker	(England)	8 July 1902 (aged 22)	Boldon Comrades	1922	
FW	William Relph	(England)	26 January 1900 (aged 24)	Ashington	1924	
FW	Vivian Rowe	(England)	18 February 1901 (aged 23)	Dulwich Hamlet	1924	Amateur
FW	Harry Williams	(England)	29 July 1898 (aged 26)	Manchester United	1923	
FW	Ralph Williams	(Wales)	2 October 1905 (aged 18)	Aberdare Athletic	1924	
FW	Bert Young	(England)	4 September 1899 (aged 24)	Aberdare Athletic	1925	

- Sources: 100 Years of Brentford, Timeless Bees, Football League Players' Records 1888 to 1939

== Coaching staff ==
=== Archie Mitchell (30 August–2 December 1924) ===
Name	Role
(England) Archie Mitchell	Manager
(England) Dusty Rhodes	Trainer

=== Fred Halliday (3 December 1924 – 2 May 1925) ===
Name	Role
(England) Fred Halliday	Manager
(England) Dusty Rhodes	Trainer

== Statistics ==
=== Appearances and goals ===

Brentford's highest appearance-makers in each position during the Football League season.

Pos	Nat	Name	League		FA Cup		Total	
Pos	Nat	Name	Apps	Goals	Apps	Goals	Apps	Goals
GK	(England)	Albert Gilbert	10	0	1	0	11	0
GK	(England)	William Young	32	0	0	0	32	0
DF	(England)	Charles Alton	17	0	1	0	18	0
DF	(England)	Edwin Cooke	6	0	0	0	6	0
DF	(England)	George Kell	35	0	1	0	36	0
DF	(England)	Edward Shepherd	2	0	0	0	2	0
DF	(Scotland)	John Steel	16	0	—		16	0
HB	(England)	Billy Broadbent	17	0	1	0	18	0
HB	(England)	Tommy Cain	9	0	1	0	10	0
HB	(Scotland)	Alex Graham	22	1	—		22	1
HB	(England)	Frank Henderson	8	0	0	0	8	0
HB	(England)	Bill Inglis	25	0	0	0	25	0
HB	(England)	Gordon Johnstone	2	0	0	0	2	0
HB	(England)	Horace Jones	16	0	0	0	16	0
HB	(England)	Ronald Rowe	8	0	0	0	8	0
HB	(England)	Jimmy Walton	23	0	1	0	24	0
FW	(England)	Jack Allen	36	14	1	0	37	14
FW	(England)	Billy Clayson	26	0	0	0	26	0
FW	(England)	Tom Garnish	25	4	1	1	26	5
FW	(Wales)	Harold Hughes	14	1	0	0	14	1
FW	(England)	Arthur Isaac	2	1	0	0	2	1
FW	(England)	Jack Lane	9	4	—		9	4
FW	(Scotland)	Jimmy McCree	3	0	—		3	0
FW	(England)	Charles McGuigan	2	0	0	0	2	0
FW	(England)	Reginald Parker	41	8	1	1	42	9
FW	(England)	William Relph	7	1	1	0	8	1
FW	(England)	Vivian Rowe	4	1	0	0	4	1
FW	(England)	Harry Williams	27	2	1	1	28	3
FW	(Wales)	Ralph Williams	7	1	0	0	7	1
FW	(England)	Bert Young	11	0	—		11	0

- Source: 100 Years of Brentford

=== Goalscorers ===
Pos.	Nat	Player	FL3	FAC	Total
FW	(England)	Jack Allen	14	0	14
FW	(England)	Reginald Parker	8	1	9
FW	(England)	Tom Garnish	4	1	5
FW	(England)	Jack Lane	4	—	4
FW	(England)	Harry Williams	2	1	3
HB	(Scotland)	Alex Graham	1	—	1
FW	(Wales)	Harold Hughes	1	0	1
FW	(England)	Arthur Isaac	1	0	1
FW	(England)	William Relph	1	0	1
FW	(England)	Vivian Rowe	1	0	1
FW	(Wales)	Ralph Williams	1	0	1
Total			38	3	41

- Source: 100 Years of Brentford

=== Management ===
Name	Nat	From	To	Record All Comps					Record League				
Name	Nat	From	To	P	W	D	L	W %	P	W	D	L	W %
Archie Mitchell	(England)	30 August 1924	29 November 1924	18	4	1	13	22.22|	17	4	1	12	23.53
Fred Halliday	(England)	6 November 1924	2 May 1925	25	5	6	14	20.00|	25	5	6	14	20.00

=== Summary ===
Games played	43 (42 Third Division South, 1 FA Cup)
Games won	9 (9 Third Division South, 0 FA Cup)
Games drawn	7 (7 Third Division South, 0 FA Cup)
Games lost	27 (26 Third Division South, 1 FA Cup)
Goals scored	41 (38 Third Division South, 3 FA Cup)
Goals conceded	96 (91 Third Division South, 5 FA Cup)
Clean sheets	9 (9 Third Division South, 0 FA Cup)
Biggest league win	3–0 versus Luton Town, 10 April 1925
Worst league defeat	7–0 versus Swansea Town, 8 November 1924
Most appearances	42, Reginald Parker (42 Third Division South, 1 FA Cup)
Top scorer (league)	14, Jack Allen
Top scorer (all competitions)	14, Jack Allen

== Transfers & loans ==
Cricketers are not included in this list.

Players transferred in
Date	Pos.	Name	Previous club	Fee	Ref.
June 1924	DF	(England) Edward Shepherd	(England) Harrow Weald	Amateur	
June 1924	FW	(Wales) Ralph Williams	(Wales) Aberdare Athletic	Free	
July 1924	HB	(England) Tommy Cain	(England) Sheppey United	Free	
August 1924	FW	(England) Jack Allen	(England) Leeds United	Free	
August 1924	HB	(England) Billy Broadbent	(England) Oldham Athletic	Free	
August 1924	DF	(England) Edwin Cooke	(England) Barnsley	Free	
August 1924	HB	(England) Frank Henderson	(England) Stockport County	Free	
August 1924	FW	(Wales) Harold Hughes	(Wales) Aberdare Athletic	Free	
August 1924	FW	(Scotland) Jimmy McCree	(England) London Caledonians	Amateur	
August 1924	FW	(England) William Relph	(England) Ashington	Free	
August 1924	FW	(England) Vivian Rowe	(England) Dulwich Hamlet	Amateur	
September 1924	GK	(England) Albert Gilbert	(England) Civil Service	Amateur	
18 November 1924	HB	(England) Jimmy Walton	(England) Bristol Rovers	£125	
3 December 1924	HB	(Scotland) Alex Graham	(England) Arsenal	£450	
1924	HB	(England) Charles Kelly	n/a	Amateur	
1924	FW	(England) Charles McGuigan	(England) Newcastle United	Free	
1924	HB	(England) Ronald Rowe	(England) Wimbledon	Amateur	
January 1925	DF	(Scotland) John Steel	(England) Arsenal	Free	
7 February 1925	n/a	(Scotland) John Stock	(Scotland) Arthurlie	n/a	
February 1925	FW	(England) Bert Young	(Wales) Aberdare Athletic	n/a	
March 1925	FW	(England) Jack Lane	(England) Chesterfield	£115	
Players released
Date	Pos.	Name	Subsequent club	Join date	Ref.
May 1925	HB	(England) Billy Broadbent	(England) Clapton Orient	June 1925	
May 1925	FW	(England) Billy Clayson	(England) Crewe Alexandra	1925	
May 1925	DF	(England) Edwin Cooke	(England) Grantham	1925	
May 1925	FW	(England) Tom Garnish	(England) Fulham	September 1925	
May 1925	HB	(England) Frank Henderson	Retired		
May 1925	FW	(Wales) Harold Hughes	n/a		
May 1925	HB	(England) Bill Inglis	(England) Reading	May 1925	
May 1925	FW	(England) Arthur Isaac	(England) Corinthian	1925	
May 1925	FW	(England) Gordon Johnstone	(England) Felling Colliery	1925	
May 1925	HB	(England) Horace Jones	(England) Hednesford Town	n/a	
May 1925	DF	(England) George Kell	(England) Hartlepools United	1925	
May 1925	HB	(England) Charles Kelly	n/a	n/a	
May 1925	FW	(Scotland) Jimmy McCree	(England) London Caledonians	1925	
May 1925	FW	(England) Charles McGuigan	(England) Wheatley Hill Colliery	1925	
May 1925	HB	(England) Ronald Rowe	(England) Wimbledon	1925	
May 1925	FW	(England) Vivian Rowe	(England) Wimbledon	1925	
May 1925	DF	(England) Edward Shepherd	Retired		
May 1925	n/a	(Scotland) John Stock	n/a		
May 1925	FW	(England) Harry Williams	Retired		
May 1925	FW	(Wales) Ralph Williams	(Wales) Aberaman Athletic	1925	
May 1925	GK	(England) William Young	Retired		
