= 1923–24 Brentford F.C. season =

English football team season

Brentford
1923–24 season
- Manager: Archie Mitchell
- Stadium: Griffin Park
- Third Division South: 17th
- FA Cup: Sixth qualifying round
- Top goalscorer: League: Parker (18); All: Parker (20)
- Highest home attendance: 12,000
- Lowest home attendance: 3,000
- Average home league attendance: 6,825
Home colours

During the 1923–24 English football season, Brentford competed in the Football League Third Division South and finished in 17th place.

== Season summary ==
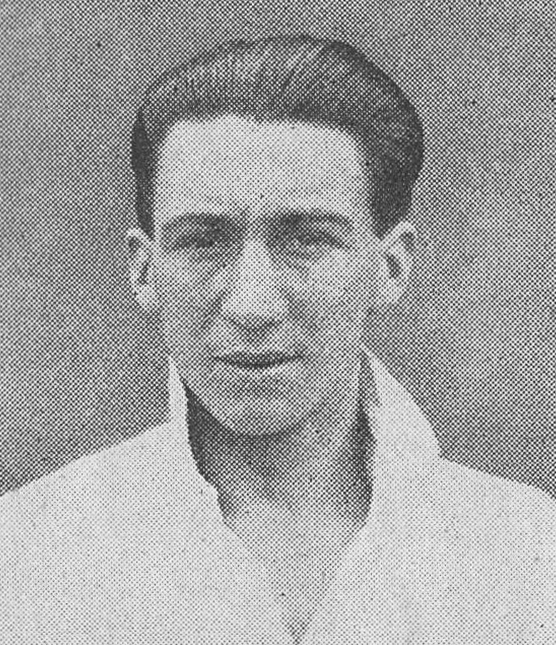
Reginald Parker scored almost half of Brentford's goals during the season.

Third Division South club Brentford decided not to conduct an overhaul of its squad during the 1923 off-season. Goalkeeper and half backs William Young, Cyril Hunter, Bill Inglis and James Kerr were retained, as was outside forward Patsy Hendren. Up front, Bobby Hughes, Henry Parkinson and Harry Williams were signed to boost the team's strikeforce. Forwards Freddy Capper, Billy Clayson and Sidney Mulford were all retained, despite scoring just 11 goals between them during the 1922–23 season.

Aside from a six-match unbeaten run in November and December 1923, Brentford spent much of the 1923–24 season in the bottom four of the Third Division South. Three wins in the final four matches lifted the club to a 17th-place finish. Youngster Reginald Parker proved to be a revelation up front and became the first Brentford player to hit 20 goals in a season since the club entered the Football League in 1920. Billy Clayson also scored 10 goals, which meant Parker and Clayson accounted for 30 of the 45 goals the Bees scored during the season. Brentford failed to draw an away league match during the campaign, a joint-club record.

== League table ==
Pos	Team	Pld	W	D	L	GF	GA	GAv	Pts
15	Gillingham	42	12	13	17	43	58	0.741	37
16	Exeter City	42	15	7	20	37	52	0.712	37
17	Brentford	42	14	8	20	54	71	0.761	36
18	Reading	42	13	9	20	51	57	0.895	35
19	Southend United	42	12	10	20	53	84	0.631	34

== Results ==
Brentford's goal tally listed first.

=== Legend ===
Win	Draw	Loss

=== Football League Third Division South ===
No.	Date	Opponent	Venue	Result	Attendance	Scorer(s)
1	25 August 1923	Queens Park Rangers	A	0–1	18,000	
2	27 August 1923	Plymouth Argyle	H	1–1	6,500	Hughes
3	1 September 1923	Queens Park Rangers	H	0–1	12,000	
4	3 September 1923	Plymouth Argyle	A	1–4	10,000	Clayson
5	8 September 1923	Luton Town	H	2–1	10,000	Clayson, Parkinson
6	10 September 1923	Aberdare Athletic	A	2–1	6,000	Parkinson, Hughes
7	15 September 1923	Luton Town	A	1–2	8,000	Hunter
8	22 September 1923	Brighton & Hove Albion	H	1–2	5,000	Hunter
9	29 September 1923	Brighton & Hove Albion	A	0–2	7,000	
10	6 October 1923	Bristol Rovers	A	0–2	10,000	
11	13 October 1923	Bristol Rovers	H	1–2	9,000	Mulford
12	20 October 1923	Southend United	A	1–3	6,000	Capper
13	27 October 1923	Southend United	H	3–1	5,000	Hughes, Parker (2)
14	3 November 1923	Portsmouth	A	0–3	9,867	
15	10 November 1923	Portsmouth	H	1–1	9,000	Capper
16	24 November 1923	Exeter City	H	1–0	4,000	Williams
17	8 December 1923	Aberdare Athletic	H	1–1	6,000	Clayson
18	22 December 1923	Gillingham	H	3–2	5,000	Johnstone, Clayson, Parker
19	25 December 1923	Bournemouth & Boscombe Athletic	A	4–2	5,000	Parker (2)
20	26 December 1923	Bournemouth & Boscombe Athletic	H	2–0	7,000	Clayson, Parker
21	29 December 1923	Millwall	A	1–4	9,000	Parker (pen)
22	5 January 1924	Millwall	H	1–3	7,000	Amos (og)
23	26 January 1924	Newport County	H	0–0	5,000	
24	2 February 1924	Merthyr Town	A	0–2	6,000	
25	9 February 1924	Merthyr Town	H	0–0	3,000	
26	16 February 1924	Charlton Athletic	A	1–3	3,000	Parker
27	24 February 1924	Charlton Athletic	H	0–0	5,000	
28	1 March 1924	Norwich City	A	3–2	7,000	Parker (2), Williams
29	8 March 1924	Norwich City	H	3–0	7,794	Mulford, Parker, Inglis
30	15 March 1924	Swindon Town	H	2–2	6,000	Alton (pen), Parker
31	19 March 1924	Gillingham	A	0–6	8,000	
32	22 March 1924	Swindon Town	A	1–2	6,000	Parker
33	29 March 1924	Watford	H	4–1	6,500	Parker (2), Garnish, Clayson
34	2 April 1924	Exeter City	A	0–1	3,500	
35	5 April 1924	Watford	A	1–0	4,500	Williams
36	12 April 1924	Swansea Town	H	2–2	7,000	Parker, Clayson
37	18 April 1924	Reading	A	0–1	11,8782	
38	19 April 1924	Swansea Town	A	0–4	6,000	
39	21 April 1924	Reading	H	4–1	5,000	Williams (2), Parker, Alton (pen)
40	22 April 1924	Newport County	A	2–3	6,000	Hughes, Parker
41	26 April 1924	Northampton Town	H	1–0	3,000	Clayson
42	3 May 1924	Northampton Town	A	3–2	4,000	Hughes (3)

=== FA Cup ===
Round	Date	Opponent	Venue	Result	Attendance	Scorer(s)	Notes
5QR	1 December 1923	Botwell Mission	A	1–2	7,629	Parker	(Note: Match played at RAF Stadium, Uxbridge.)
5QR (replay)	5 December 1923	Botwell Mission	H	2–0	6,200	Clayson, Parker (pen)	
6QR	15 December 1923	Portsmouth	H	1–1	9,059	Clayson	
6QR (replay)	19 December 1923	Portsmouth	A	0–1	11,664		

- Sources: Statto, 100 Years of Brentford, The Complete History

== Playing squad ==
Players' ages are as of the opening day of the 1923–24 season.

Pos.	Name	Nat.	Date of birth (age)	Signed from	Signed in	Notes
Goalkeepers
GK	William Young	(England)	4 August 1892 (aged 31)	South Shields	1920	
Defenders
DF	Philip Allen	(England)	5 November 1902 (aged 20)	Grenadier Guards	1922	
DF	Charles Alton	(England)	24 December 1891 (aged 31)	Rotherham County	1921	
DF	George Kell	(England)	13 July 1896 (aged 27)	The Wednesday	1922	
DF	John Pearson	(England)	14 March 1896 (aged 27)	Burnley	1923	
Midfielders
HB	Cyril Hunter	(England)	8 February 1898 (aged 25)	Leadgate Park	1921	
HB	Bill Inglis	(England)	4 September 1899 (aged 23)	Derby County	1922	
HB	Roland James	(England)	4 May 1897 (aged 26)	West Bromwich Albion	1922	
HB	Horace Jones	(England)	n/a	Ton Pentre	1922	
HB	James Kerr	(Scotland)	7 April 1894 (aged 29)	Blackburn Rovers	1921	
Forwards
FW	Freddy Capper (c)	(England)	8 May 1892 (aged 32)	The Wednesday	1921	
FW	Billy Clayson	(England)	12 July 1897 (aged 26)	Wellingborough Town	1922	
FW	Tom Garnish	(England)	3 May 1900 (aged 23)	Wandsworth	1923	
FW	Patsy Hendren	(England)	5 February 1889 (aged 34)	Queens Park Rangers	1911	Played when his cricket commitments allowed
FW	Bobby Hughes	(England)	5 September 1892 (aged 30)	Sheffield United	1923	
FW	Gordon Johnstone	(England)	21 April 1900 (aged 23)	Houghton Rovers	1922	
FW	Sidney Mulford	(England)	23 November 1896 (aged 26)	Kew Association	1922	
FW	Reginald Parker	(England)	8 July 1902 (aged 21)	Boldon Comrades	1922	
FW	Henry Parkinson	(England)	1 April 1899 (aged 24)	Hazel Grove	1923	
FW	Harry Williams	(England)	29 July 1898 (aged 25)	Manchester United	1923	
Players who left the club mid-season
DF	Bert Gower	(England)	26 March 1899 (aged 24)	Ealing Celtic	1923	Amateur, transferred to Southall

- Sources: Timeless Bees, Football League Players' Records 1888 to 1939, 100 Years Of Brentford

== Coaching staff ==
Name	Role
(England) Archie Mitchell	Manager
(England) Dusty Rhodes	Trainer

== Statistics ==
=== Appearances and goals ===

Brentford's highest appearance-makers in each position during the Football League season.

Pos	Nat	Name	League		FA Cup		Total	
Pos	Nat	Name	Apps	Goals	Apps	Goals	Apps	Goals
GK	(England)	William Young	42	0	4	0	46	0
DF	(England)	Bert Gower	2	0	0	0	2	0
DF	(England)	Philip Allen	2	0	0	0	2	0
DF	(England)	Charles Alton	31	2	0	0	31	2
DF	(England)	George Kell	24	0	4	0	28	0
DF	(England)	John Pearson	26	0	4	0	30	0
HB	(England)	Cyril Hunter	31	2	3	0	34	2
HB	(England)	Bill Inglis	30	1	4	0	34	1
HB	(England)	Roland James	15	0	0	0	15	0
HB	(England)	Horace Jones	12	0	1	0	13	0
HB	(Scotland)	James Kerr	23	0	4	0	27	0
FW	(England)	Freddy Capper	23	3	4	0	27	3
FW	(England)	Billy Clayson	26	8	3	2	29	10
FW	(England)	Tom Garnish	19	1	1	0	20	1
FW	(England)	Patsy Hendren	27	0	4	0	31	0
FW	(England)	Bobby Hughes	16	7	1	0	17	7
FW	(England)	Gordon Johnstone	29	1	0	0	29	1
FW	(England)	Sidney Mulford	14	2	0	0	14	2
FW	(England)	Reginald Parker	39	18	4	2	43	20
FW	(England)	Henry Parkinson	7	2	0	0	7	2
FW	(England)	Harry Williams	25	5	3	0	28	5

- Players listed in italics left the club mid-season.
- Source: 100 Years of Brentford

=== Goalscorers ===
Pos.	Nat	Player	FL3	FAC	Total
FW	(England)	Reginald Parker	18	2	20
FW	(England)	Billy Clayson	9	2	11
FW	(England)	Bobby Hughes	7	0	7
HB	(England)	Harry Williams	5	0	5
FW	(England)	Freddy Capper	3	0	3
DF	(England)	Charles Alton	2	0	2
HB	(England)	Cyril Hunter	2	0	2
FW	(England)	Sidney Mulford	2	0	2
FW	(England)	Henry Parkinson	2	0	2
FW	(England)	Tom Garnish	1	0	1
HB	(England)	Bill Inglis	1	0	1
FW	(England)	Gordon Johnstone	1	0	1
Opponents			1	0	1
Total			41	4	45

- Players listed in italics left the club mid-season.
- Source: 100 Years of Brentford

=== Management ===
Name	Nat	From	To	Record All Comps					Record League				
Name	Nat	From	To	P	W	D	L	W %	P	W	D	L	W %
Archie Mitchell	(England)	25 August 1923	3 May 1924	46	14	14	18	30.43|	42	13	12	17	30.95

=== Summary ===
Games played	46 (42 Third Division South, 4 FA Cup)
Games won	14 (13 Third Division South, 1 FA Cup)
Games drawn	14 (12 Third Division South, 2 FA Cup)
Games lost	18 (17 Third Division South, 1 FA Cup)
Goals scored	45 (41 Third Division South, 4 FA Cup)
Goals conceded	55 (51 Third Division South, 4 FA Cup)
Clean sheets	9 (8 Third Division South, 1 FA Cup)
Biggest league win	3–0 versus Norwich City, 8 March 1924; 4–1 on two occasions
Worst league defeat	6–0 versus Gillingham, 19 March 1924
Most appearances	46, William Young (42 Third Division South, 4 FA Cup)
Top scorer (league)	18, Reginald Parker
Top scorer (all competitions)	20, Reginald Parker

== Transfers & loans ==
Cricketers are not included in this list.

Players transferred in
Date	Pos.	Name	Previous club	Fee	Ref.
July 1923	FW	(England) Henry Parkinson	(England) Hazel Grove	Free	
July 1923	DF	(England) John Pearson	(England) Burnley	Free	
August 1923	DF	(England) Bert Gower	(England) Ealing Celtic	Free	
August 1923	FW	(England) Bobby Hughes	(England) Sheffield United	Free	
September 1923	FW	(England) Harry Williams	(England) Manchester United	£300	
1923	FW	(England) James Batchelor	(England) Gillingham	n/a	
1923	FW	(England) Tom Garnish	(England) Wandsworth	Free	
1923	FW	(England) Arthur Isaac	(England) Cambridge Town	Amateur	
Players transferred out
Date	Pos.	Name	Subsequent club	Fee	Ref.
February 1924	DF	(England) Bert Gower	(England) Southall	Amateur	
Players released
Date	Pos.	Name	Subsequent club	Join date	Ref.
May 1924	DF	(England) Philip Allen	(England) Peterborough & Fletton United	1924	
May 1924	FW	(England) Freddy Capper	Retired		
May 1924	FW	(England) Bobby Hughes	(England) Rochdale	1924	
May 1924	HB	(England) Cyril Hunter	(England) South Shields	September 1924	
May 1924	HB	(England) Roland James	(England) Stockport County	1924	
May 1924	HB	(Scotland) James Kerr	(Scotland) Annandale United	1924	
May 1924	FW	(England) Sidney Mulford	(England) Northfleet United	1924	
May 1924	FW	(England) Henry Parkinson	(England) Lytham	1924	
May 1924	DF	(England) John Pearson	(England) Grimsby Town	1924	
