= Gordon Johnstone =

Gordon Johnstone may refer to:

- Gordon Johnstone (cricketer) (1885–1961), Australian cricketer
- Gordon Johnstone (footballer) (1900–1961), English footballer
