= Peter Duncan =

Peter Duncan may refer to:

- Peter Duncan (actor) (born 1954), former Blue Peter presenter and former UK Chief Scout
- Peter Duncan (British politician) (born 1965), Scottish Conservative Party politician, former Member of Parliament
- Peter Duncan (Australian politician) (born 1945), former member of the South Australian and Federal parliaments
- Peter Duncan (director) (born 1964), Australian filmmaker
- Peter Duncan (alpine skier) (born 1944), Canadian skier
- Peter Duncan (swimmer) (born 1935), South African Olympic swimmer
- Peter Duncan (footballer) (1890–1974), Scottish football inside left
- Peter Martin Duncan (1824–1891), English palaeontologist
