= 1926–27 Newport County A.F.C. season =

Welsh association football club season

Newport County
1926–27 season
- Manager: Jimmy Hindmarsh
- Stadium: Somerton Park
- Third Division South: 9th
- FA Cup: 1st round
- Welsh Cup: 6th round
- Top goalscorer: League: James (9); All: James (9)
- Highest home attendance: 9,262 vs Plymouth Argyle (28 August 1926)
- Lowest home attendance: 1,721 vs Brentford (25 April 1927)
- Average home league attendance: 5,193
| Home colours | Away colours |

The 1926–27 season was Newport County's seventh season in the Football League, sixth season in the Third Division South and seventh season overall in the third tier.

== Season review ==
=== Results summary ===
| Overall | | | | | | | | Home | | | | | | Away | | | | | |
| Pld | W | D | L | GF | GA | GAv | Pts | W | D | L | GF | GA | Pts | W | D | L | GF | GA | Pts |
|---|---|---|---|---|---|---|---|---|---|---|---|---|---|---|---|---|---|---|---|
| 42 | 19 | 6 | 17 | 57 | 71 | 0.803 | 44 | 15 | 4 | 2 | 40 | 20 | 34 | 4 | 2 | 15 | 17 | 51 | 10 |

Source: rsssf.com

=== Results by round ===
| Round | 1 | 2 | 3 | 4 | 5 | 6 | 7 | 8 | 9 | 10 | 11 | 12 | 13 | 14 | 15 | 16 | 17 | 18 | 19 | 20 | 21 | 22 | 23 | 24 | 25 | 26 | 27 | 28 | 29 | 30 | 31 | 32 | 33 | 34 | 35 | 36 | 37 | 38 | 39 | 40 | 41 | 42 |
|---|---|---|---|---|---|---|---|---|---|---|---|---|---|---|---|---|---|---|---|---|---|---|---|---|---|---|---|---|---|---|---|---|---|---|---|---|---|---|---|---|---|---|
| Ground | H | A | A | H | A | H | A | H | H | A | H | A | H | A | H | A | A | H | A | H | A | H | A | A | H | H | H | A | H | A | H | A | H | H | A | H | A | A | H | A | A | H |
| Result | W | L | W | D | W | W | D | W | W | L | W | L | W | L | W | L | W | D | L | W | L | W | W | L | W | W | W | L | W | L | W | L | W | L | L | L | D | L | D | L | L | D |
| Position | 7 | 13 | 8 | 9 | 6 | 5 | 8 | 4 | 2 | 4 | 3 | 5 | 4 | 4 | 4 | 5 | 5 | 5 | 5 | 5 | 6 | 5 | 5 | 5 | 5 | 5 | 6 | 6 | 5 | 6 | 6 | 6 | 6 | 6 | 6 | 6 | 6 | 8 | 7 | 7 | 8 | 9 |

Updated to match(es) played on 7 May 1927. Source: statto.com
A = Away; H = Home; W = Win; D = Draw; L = Loss

== Fixtures and results ==
=== Third Division South ===
| Date | Opponents | Venue | Result | Scorers | Attendance |
|---|---|---|---|---|---|
| 28 Aug 1926 | Plymouth Argyle | H | 2–1 | Nairn, Holland | 9,262 |
| 1 Sep 1926 | Bristol City | A | 1–4 | Carney | 13,478 |
| 4 Sep 1926 | Merthyr Town | A | 2–1 | Forward, OG | 5,259 |
| 9 Sep 1926 | Bristol City | H | 0–0 | | 7,888 |
| 11 Sep 1926 | Aberdare Athletic | A | 1–0 | Johnson | 2,741 |
| 18 Sep 1926 | Gillingham | H | 1–0 | Price | 7,141 |
| 25 Sep 1926 | Watford | A | 0–0 | | 7,720 |
| 30 Sep 1926 | Charlton Athletic | H | 2–1 | Nairn, Price | 4,687 |
| 2 Oct 1926 | Crystal Palace | H | 2–1 | Price, Gittins | 6,985 |
| 9 Oct 1926 | Coventry City | A | 1–3 | James | 7,931 |
| 16 Oct 1926 | Luton Town | H | 3–2 | Johnson, James, Gittins | 6,821 |
| 23 Oct 1926 | Southend United | A | 0–5 | | 6,481 |
| 30 Oct 1926 | Exeter City | H | 2–0 | James, Gittins | 6,454 |
| 6 Nov 1926 | Swindon Town | A | 1–3 | Gittins | 4,870 |
| 13 Nov 1926 | Bristol Rovers | H | 1–0 | Nairn | 3,927 |
| 20 Nov 1926 | Millwall | A | 1–4 | Holland | 7,004 |
| 4 Dec 1926 | Northampton Town | A | 2–1 | Price 2 | 5,508 |
| 11 Dec 1926 | Millwall | H | 1–1 | Nairn | 5,345 |
| 18 Dec 1926 | Norwich City | A | 0–1 | | 6,667 |
| 25 Dec 1926 | Bournemouth & Boscombe Athletic | H | 2–1 | Nairn, Forward | 6,359 |
| 27 Dec 1926 | Bournemouth & Boscombe Athletic | A | 1–2 | Nairn | 8,916 |
| 1 Jan 1927 | Northampton Town | H | 1–0 | Johnson | 5,006 |
| 8 Jan 1927 | Gillingham | A | 1–0 | Price | 4,611 |
| 15 Jan 1927 | Plymouth Argyle | A | 1–4 | Price | 8,943 |
| 22 Jan 1927 | Merthyr Town | H | 4–3 | Johnson, Price, Nairn, Forward | 5,083 |
| 29 Jan 1927 | Aberdare Athletic | H | 5–2 | Johnson 2, Drinnan, Forward, Gittins | 3,436 |
| 12 Feb 1927 | Watford | H | 2–1 | Gittins, Hiles | 4,291 |
| 19 Feb 1927 | Crystal Palace | A | 2–6 | Johnson, Weaver | 10,328 |
| 26 Feb 1927 | Coventry City | H | 4–1 | James 2, Bowsher, Gittins | 3,856 |
| 5 Mar 1927 | Luton Town | A | 1–4 | Johnson | 5,240 |
| 12 Mar 1927 | Southend United | H | 3–0 | Gittins, Hiles, Weaver | 4,725 |
| 19 Mar 1927 | Exeter City | A | 1–2 | James | 6,509 |
| 26 Mar 1927 | Swindon Town | H | 5–3 | James 2, Weaver 2, Hiles | 4,751 |
| 31 Mar 1927 | Brighton & Hove Albion | H | 0–1 | | 2,956 |
| 2 Apr 1927 | Bristol Rovers | A | 0–4 | | 5,544 |
| 15 Apr 1927 | Queens Park Rangers | H | 0–2 | | 5,938 |
| 16 Apr 1927 | Brentford | A | 1–1 | Walker | 7,801 |
| 18 Apr 1927 | Queens Park Rangers | A | 0–2 | | 9,057 |
| 25 Apr 1927 | Brentford | H | 0–0 | | 1,721 |
| 28 Apr 1927 | Charlton Athletic | A | 0–3 | | 4,010 |
| 30 Apr 1927 | Brighton & Hove Albion | A | 0–1 | | 6,045 |
| 7 May 1927 | Norwich City | H | 0–0 | | 2,425 |

=== FA Cup ===
| Round | Date | Opponents | Venue | Result | Scorers | Attendance |
|---|---|---|---|---|---|---|
| 1 | 27 Nov 1926 | Poole Athletic | A | 0–1 | | 2,666 |

=== Welsh Cup ===
| Round | Date | Opponents | Venue | Result | Scorers | Attendance |
|---|---|---|---|---|---|---|
| 6 | 10 Mar 1927 | Lovells Athletic | A | 0–1 | | |

== League table ==
| Pos | Team | Pld | W | D | L | F | A | GA | Pts |
|---|---|---|---|---|---|---|---|---|---|
| 1 | Bristol City | 42 | 27 | 8 | 7 | 104 | 54 | 1.926 | 62 |
| 2 | Plymouth Argyle | 42 | 25 | 10 | 7 | 95 | 61 | 1.557 | 60 |
| 3 | Millwall | 42 | 23 | 10 | 9 | 89 | 51 | 1.745 | 56 |
| 4 | Brighton & Hove Albion | 42 | 21 | 11 | 10 | 79 | 50 | 1.580 | 53 |
| 5 | Swindon Town | 42 | 21 | 9 | 12 | 100 | 85 | 1.176 | 51 |
| 6 | Crystal Palace | 42 | 18 | 9 | 15 | 84 | 81 | 1.037 | 45 |
| 7 | Bournemouth & Boscombe Athletic | 42 | 18 | 8 | 16 | 78 | 66 | 1.182 | 44 |
| 8 | Luton Town | 42 | 15 | 14 | 13 | 68 | 66 | 1.030 | 44 |
| 9 | Newport County | 42 | 19 | 6 | 17 | 57 | 71 | 0.803 | 44 |
| 10 | Bristol Rovers | 42 | 16 | 9 | 17 | 78 | 80 | 0.975 | 41 |
| 11 | Brentford | 42 | 13 | 14 | 15 | 70 | 61 | 1.148 | 40 |
| 12 | Exeter City | 42 | 15 | 10 | 17 | 76 | 73 | 1.041 | 40 |
| 13 | Charlton Athletic | 42 | 16 | 8 | 18 | 60 | 61 | 0.984 | 40 |
| 14 | Queens Park Rangers | 42 | 15 | 9 | 18 | 65 | 71 | 0.915 | 39 |
| 15 | Coventry City | 42 | 15 | 7 | 20 | 71 | 86 | 0.826 | 37 |
| 16 | Norwich City | 42 | 12 | 11 | 19 | 59 | 71 | 0.831 | 35 |
| 17 | Merthyr Town | 42 | 13 | 9 | 20 | 63 | 80 | 0.787 | 35 |
| 18 | Northampton Town | 42 | 15 | 5 | 22 | 59 | 87 | 0.678 | 35 |
| 19 | Southend United | 42 | 14 | 6 | 22 | 64 | 77 | 0.831 | 34 |
| 20 | Gillingham | 42 | 11 | 10 | 21 | 54 | 72 | 0.750 | 32 |
| 21 | Watford | 42 | 12 | 8 | 22 | 57 | 87 | 0.655 | 32 |
| 22 | Aberdare Athletic | 42 | 9 | 7 | 26 | 62 | 101 | 0.614 | 25 |

| Key | |
|---|---|
| | Division Champions |
| | Re-elected |
| | Failed re-election |

P = Matches played; W = Matches won; D = Matches drawn; L = Matches lost; F = Goals for; A = Goals against; GA = Goal average; Pts = Points
