= Harold Hughes (footballer) =

Welsh footballer

Personal information
- Full name: Harold Hughes
- Date of birth: 1902
- Place of birth: Merthyr Tydfil, Wales
- Position: Inside right

Senior career*
Years	Team	Apps	(Gls)
1921	Merthyr Town	7	(0)
1923	Aberdare Athletic	9	(2)
1924–1925	Brentford	14	(1)
- * Club domestic league appearances and goals

Harold Hughes was a Welsh professional footballer who played in the Football League for Brentford, Aberdare Athletic and Merthyr Town as a forward.

== Career statistics ==
Appearances and goals by club, season and competition
Club	Season	League			FA Cup		Total	
Club	Season	Division	Apps	Goals	Apps	Goals	Apps	Goals
Brentford	1924–25	Third Division South	14	1	0	0	14	1
Career total			14	1	0	0	14	1
