= James Batchelor =

James Batchelor may refer to:

- James Batchelor (footballer) (1895–1951), English footballer
- James Batchelor (rugby league) (born 1998), English rugby league footballer
