= Arthur Isaac =

Arthur Isaac may refer to:

- Arthur Isaac (cricketer) (1873–1916), English first-class cricketer
- Arthur Isaac (footballer) (1898–?), Argentinian-born English amateur footballer

== See also ==
- Isaac Arthur, science educator and YouTuber
