= Edward Shepherd (footballer) =

English footballer

Personal information
- Full name: Edward Arthur Shepherd
- Date of birth: 18 May 1903
- Place of birth: Harrow, England
- Date of death: November 1984 (aged 81)
- Place of death: Hillingdon, England
- Position: Full back

Senior career*
Years	Team	Apps	(Gls)
–1924	Harrow Weald		
1924–1925	Brentford	2	(0)
- * Club domestic league appearances and goals

Edward Arthur Shepherd (18 May 1903 – November 1984) was an English professional footballer who played as a full back in the Football League for Brentford.

== Career statistics ==
Appearances and goals by club, season and competition
Club	Season	League			FA Cup		Total	
Club	Season	Division	Apps	Goals	Apps	Goals	Apps	Goals
Brentford	1924–25	Third Division South	2	0	0	0	2	0
Career total			2	0	0	0	2	0
