= Frank Henderson (footballer) =

English footballer

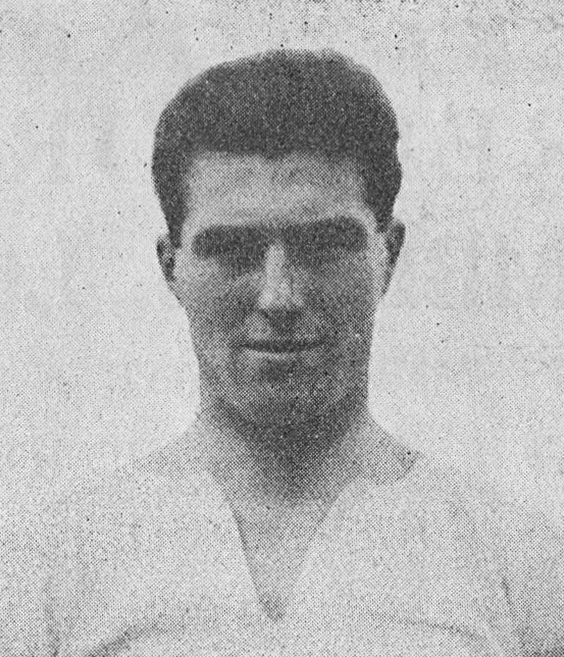
- Henderson while with Brentford in 1924.

Personal information
- Full name: Frank Henderson
- Date of birth: 24 September 1900
- Place of birth: Stockport, England
- Date of death: September 1966 (aged 65–66)
- Place of death: Manchester, England
- Height: 5 ft 8 1/2 in (1.74 m)
- Position: Left half

Senior career*
Years	Team	Apps	(Gls)
1923–1924	Stockport County	3	(0)
1924–1925	Brentford	8	(0)
- * Club domestic league appearances and goals

Frank Henderson (24 September 1900 – September 1966) was an English footballer who played as a left half in the Football League for Brentford and Stockport County.

== Career statistics ==
Appearances and goals by club, season and competition
Club	Season	League			FA Cup		Total	
Club	Season	Division	Apps	Goals	Apps	Goals	Apps	Goals
Stockport County	1923–24	Second Division	3	0	0	0	3	0
Brentford	1924–25	Third Division South	8	0	0	0	8	0
Career total			11	0	0	0	11	0
