= Horace Jones (footballer) =

English footballer

Personal information
- Full name: Horace Jones
- Place of birth: Stafford, England
- Position: Wing half

Senior career*
Years	Team	Apps	(Gls)
- Ton Pentre
1922–1925	Brentford	31	(0)
- Hednesford Town
- * Club domestic league appearances and goals

Horace Jones was an English professional footballer who played as a wing half in the Football League for Brentford.

== Career statistics ==
Appearances and goals by club, season and competition
Club	Season	League			FA Cup		Total	
Club	Season	Division	Apps	Goals	Apps	Goals	Apps	Goals
Brentford	1922–23	Third Division South	3	0	0	0	3	0
Brentford	1923–24	Third Division South	12	0	1	0	13	0
Brentford	1924–25	Third Division South	16	0	0	0	16	0
Career Total			31	0	1	0	32	0
