= Harry Williams (footballer, born 1898) =

English footballer

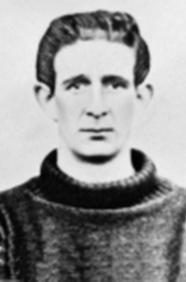
- Williams while with Manchester United in 1922.

Personal information
- Full name: Henry Archibald Williams
- Date of birth: 29 July 1898
- Place of birth: Hucknall Torkard, England
- Date of death: 8 April 1980 (aged 81)
- Place of death: Sheerness, England
- Height: 5 ft 11 in (1.80 m)
- Positions: Inside left; centre half

Senior career*
Years	Team	Apps	(Gls)
- Hucknall Olympic
1918–1921	Sunderland	1	(0)
1921–1922	Chesterfield	29	(10)
1922–1923	Manchester United	5	(2)
1923–1925	Brentford	52	(7)
- * Club domestic league appearances and goals

Henry Archibald Williams (29 July 1898 – 8 April 1980) was an English professional footballer who played as an inside left in the Football League for Sunderland, Chesterfield, Manchester United and Brentford.

== Career statistics ==
Appearances and goals by club, season and competition
Club	Season	League			FA Cup		Other		Total	
Club	Season	Division	Apps	Goals	Apps	Goals	Apps	Goals	Apps	Goals
Sunderland	1920–21	First Division	1	0	0	0	—		1	0
Chesterfield	1920–21	Midland League	1	0	0	0	2 (Note: Appearances in Derbyshire Senior Cup)	2	3	2
Chesterfield	1921–22	Third Division North	28	10	0	0	—		28	10
Chesterfield	Total		29	10	0	0	2	2	31	10
Manchester United	1922–23	Second Division	5	2			—		5	2
Brentford	1923–24	Third Division South	25	5	3		—		28	5
Brentford	1924–25	Third Division South	27	2	1	1	—		28	3
Brentford	Total		52	7	4	1	—		56	8
Career total			87	19	4	1	2	2	93	20

== Honours ==
Chesterfield

- Derbyshire Senior Cup: 1920–21
