= John Haggan =

English footballer

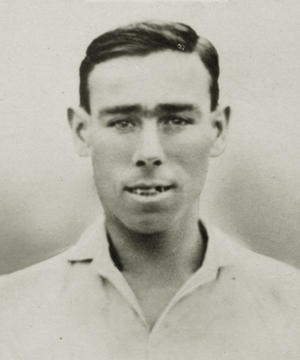
- Haggan while with Brentford in 1921

Personal information
- Full name: John Haggan
- Date of birth: 16 December 1896
- Place of birth: Boldon, England
- Date of death: June 1982 (aged 85)
- Place of death: Gateshead, England
- Height: 5 ft 8 1/2 in (1.74 m)
- Position: Wing half

Senior career*
Years	Team	Apps	(Gls)
- Usworth Colliery
1919–1920	Sunderland	2	(0)
1922–1923	Brentford	18	(1)
1923–1924	Preston Colliery		
1924	Hamilton United		
1925–1926	Usworth Colliery		
1926	Washington Co-op Wednesday		
- * Club domestic league appearances and goals

John Haggan (16 December 1896 – June 1982) was an English professional footballer who played as a wing half in the Football League for Brentford and Sunderland.

== Career statistics ==
Appearances and goals by club, season and competition
Club	Season	League			FA Cup		Total	
Club	Season	Division	Apps	Goals	Apps	Goals	Apps	Goals
Sunderland	1919–20	First Division	2	0	0	0	2	0
Brentford	1922–23	Third Division South	18	1	3	0	21	1
Career total			20	1	3	0	23	1
