= Ronald Rowe (footballer) =

English footballer

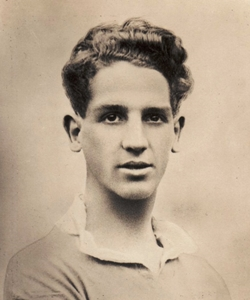
- Rowe while with Wimbledon in 1925.

Personal information
- Full name: Ronald George Rowe
- Date of birth: 11 October 1902
- Place of birth: Fulham, England
- Date of death: December 1977 (aged 75)
- Place of death: Chatham, England
- Position: Wing half

Senior career*
Years	Team	Apps	(Gls)
- Olympus Athletic
–1921	St Paul's		
1921–1924	Wimbledon		
1924–1925	Brentford	8	(0)
1925–1929	Wimbledon		
1929–1932	Hayes		
1931	Uxbridge		
1932–1934	Golders Green	42	(17)
- Pinner
- * Club domestic league appearances and goals

Ronald George Rowe (11 October 1902 – December 1977) was an English amateur footballer who played in the Football League for Brentford as a wing half. He made over 300 appearances in non-League football for Wimbledon and Hayes and is a member of the latter club's Hall of Fame.

== Personal life ==
Rowe was the father of table tennis sisters Rosalind and Diane Rowe and his older brother Vivian was also an amateur footballer. He attended Latymer Upper School.

== Career statistics ==
Appearances and goals by club, season and competition
Club	Season	League			FA Cup		Other		Total	
Club	Season	Division	Apps	Goals	Apps	Goals	Apps	Goals	Apps	Goals
Brentford	1924–25	Third Division South	8	0	0	0	—		8	0
Golders Green	1932–33	Athenian League	23	13	3	6	11 (Note: 6 appearances and 5 goals in AFA Senior Cup, 3 appearances and 4 goals in Middlesex Senior Charity Cup, 1 appearance in FA Amateur Cup, 1 appearance in Middlesex Senior Cup)	9	37	28
Golders Green	1933–34	Athenian League	19	4	1	2	13 (Note: 4 appearances and 2 goals in AFA Senior Cup, 4 appearances and 2 goals in Middlesex Senior Cup, 4 appearances and 1 goal in Middlesex Senior Charity Cup, 1 appearance in London Senior Cup)	5	33	11
Golders Green	Total		42	17	4	8	24	14	70	39
Career total			50	17	4	8	24	14	78	39

== Honours ==
Hayes

- London Senior Cup: 1931–32

Individual

- Hayes Hall of Fame
