= Harry Stott (footballer) =

English footballer (1899–1955)

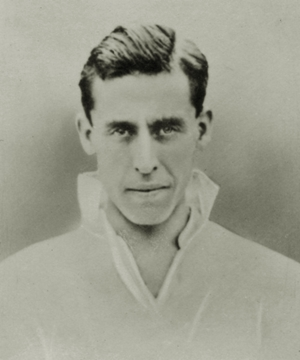
- Stott while with Brentford in 1921.

Personal information
- Full name: Harold Stott
- Date of birth: 24 April 1899
- Place of birth: North Shields, England
- Date of death: 14 February 1955 (aged 55)
- Place of death: Newcastle upon Tyne, England
- Height: 5 ft 6 1/2 in (1.69 m)
- Position: Outside forward

Senior career*
| Years | Team | Apps | (Gls) |
- Preston Colliery
| 1921–1922 | Aston Villa | 0 | (0) |
| 1922–1923 | Brentford | 24 | (0) |
| 1923– | Preston Colliery | | |
| 1927 | Barnsley | 0 | (0) |
- * Club domestic league appearances and goals

Harold Stott (24 April 1899 – 14 February 1955) was an English professional footballer who played as an outside forward in the Football League for Brentford.

== Career statistics ==
Appearances and goals by club, season and competition
| Club | Season | League | | | FA Cup | | Total | |
| Club | Season | Division | Apps | Goals | Apps | Goals | Apps | Goals |
|---|---|---|---|---|---|---|---|---|
| Brentford | 1922–23 | Third Division South | 24 | 0 | 0 | 0 | 24 | 0 |
| Career total | | | 24 | 0 | 0 | 0 | 24 | 0 |
