= Charles McGuigan =

English footballer

Personal information
- Full name: Charles McGuigan
- Date of birth: 13 December 1900
- Place of birth: Thornley, England
- Date of death: March 1949 (aged 48)
- Place of death: Durham, England
- Position: Outside forward

Senior career*
Years	Team	Apps	(Gls)
- Wheatley Hill Ramblers
- Houghton Rovers
- Wheatley Hill Alliance
	Newcastle United	0	(0)
1924–1925	Brentford	2	(0)
- Wheatley Hill Colliery
1925–1926	Weymouth	1	(0)
	Barrow	10	(0)
- Sheppey United
- Peterborough & Fletton United
- Shildon Colliery Welfare
- Horden Colliery Welfare
- Thornley Colliery Welfare
- Thornley St Godric's
- * Club domestic league appearances and goals

Charles McGuigan (13 December 1900 – March 1949) was an English professional footballer who played in the Football League for Brentford and Barrow as an outside forward.

== Career statistics ==
Appearances and goals by club, season and competition
Club	Season	League			FA Cup		Total	
Club	Season	Division	Apps	Goals	Apps	Goals	Apps	Goals
Brentford	1924–25	Third Division South	2	0	0	0	2	0
Career total			2	0	0	0	2	0
