= Edwin Cooke =

English footballer

Personal information
- Full name: Edwin Richard Cooke
- Date of birth: 26 February 1903
- Place of birth: Basford, England
- Date of death: 24 May 1978 (aged 75)
- Place of death: Kirkby-in-Ashfield, England
- Position: Full back

Youth career
- South Kirkby

Senior career*
Years	Team	Apps	(Gls)
- Mansfield Town
	Barnsley	0	(0)
1924–1925	Brentford	6	(0)
- Grantham
- Mansfield Town
- * Club domestic league appearances and goals

Edwin Richard Cooke (26 February 1903 – 24 May 1978) was an English professional footballer who played as a full back in the Football League for Brentford.

== Personal life ==
Cooke was one of three brothers to play League football.

== Career statistics ==
Appearances and goals by club, season and competition
Club	Season	League			FA Cup		Total	
Club	Season	Division	Apps	Goals	Apps	Goals	Apps	Goals
Brentford	1924–25	Third Division South	6	0	0	0	6	0
Career total			6	0	0	0	6	0
