= Bill Inglis (footballer, born 1899) =

English footballer and manager

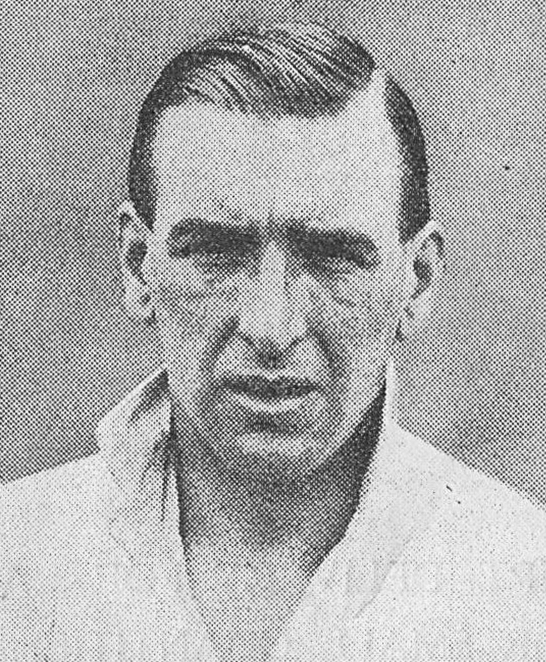
- Inglis while with Brentford in 1924.

Personal information
- Full name: William Inglis
- Date of birth: 4 September 1899
- Place of birth: Cramlington, England
- Date of death: 12 January 1977 (aged 77)
- Place of death: Dartford, England
- Positions: Half back; full back

Youth career
- Wallsend Juniors

Senior career*
Years	Team	Apps	(Gls)
- Newcastle United
–1921	Hebburn Colliery		
1921–1922	Derby County	0	(0)
1922–1925	Brentford	80	(1)
1925–1930	Reading	120	(1)
1930–1931	Exeter City	15	(0)
1931–1932	Stockport County	35	(1)
1932–1933	Watford	12	(0)
1933–1934	Dartford		
1934–1937	Cray Wanderers	91	(5)

Managerial career
- 1934–1937: Cray Wanderers (player-manager)
- * Club domestic league appearances and goals

William Inglis (4 September 1899 – 12 January 1977) was an English professional footballer who played as a half back in the Football League, most notably for Reading and Brentford. He later player-managed Kent League club Cray Wanderers.

== Career statistics ==
Appearances and goals by club, season and competition
Club	Season	League			FA Cup		Total	
Club	Season	Division	Apps	Goals	Apps	Goals	Apps	Goals
Brentford	1922–23	Third Division South	25	0	3	0	28	0
Brentford	1923–24	Third Division South	30	1	4	0	34	1
Brentford	1924–25	Third Division South	25	0	0	0	25	0
Brentford	Total		80	1	7	0	87	1
Stockport County	1931–32	Third Division North	35	1	1	0	36	1
Watford	1932–33	Third Division South	12	0	0	0	12	0
Career Total			127	2	8	0	135	2

== Honours ==
Reading

- Football League Third Division South: 1925–26
