= Roland James (footballer) =

English footballer (1897–1979)

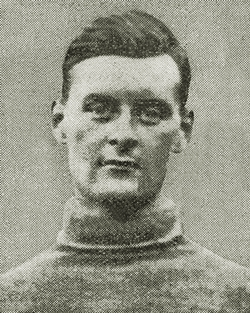
- James while with Brentford in 1922.

Personal information
- Full name: Roland William James
- Date of birth: 4 May 1897
- Place of birth: Smethwick, England
- Date of death: June 1979 (aged 82)
- Place of death: Stockport, England
- Height: 5 ft 10 in (1.78 m)
- Positions: Inside forward; right half

Youth career
- Smethwick Highfield

Senior career*
Years	Team	Apps	(Gls)
1919–1922	West Bromwich Albion	9	(4)
1922–1924	Brentford	35	(1)
1924–1928	Stockport County	33	(3)
- Manchester Central
- Stalybridge Celtic
- * Club domestic league appearances and goals

Roland William James (4 May 1897 – June 1979), sometimes known as Roly James, was an English professional footballer who played as an inside forward and right half in the Football League for Stockport County, Brentford and West Bromwich Albion.

== Career statistics ==
Appearances and goals by club, season and competition
Club	Season	League			FA Cup		Total	
Club	Season	Division	Apps	Goals	Apps	Goals	Apps	Goals
West Bromwich Albion	1920–21	First Division	8	4	0	0	8	4
West Bromwich Albion	1921–22	First Division	1	0	0	0	1	0
West Bromwich Albion	Total		9	4	0	0	9	4
Brentford	1922–23	Third Division South	20	1	1	0	21	1
Brentford	1923–24	Third Division South	15	0	0	0	15	0
Brentford	Total		35	1	1	0	36	1
Stockport County	1923–24	Second Division	4	1	0	0	4	1
Stockport County	1924–25	Second Division	3	0	0	0	3	0
Stockport County	1925–26	Third Division North	25	2	1	0	26	2
Stockport County	1926–27	Third Division North	1	0	0	0	1	0
Stockport County	Total		33	3	1	0	34	3
Career Total			77	8	2	0	79	8
