= John Steel (footballer, born 1895) =

Scottish footballer

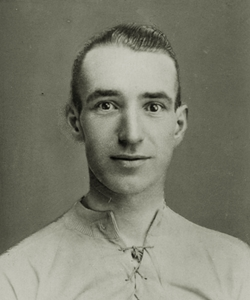
- Steele while with Nelson in 1923.

Personal information
- Full name: John Hay Steel
- Date of birth: 1895
- Place of birth: Glasgow, Scotland
- Date of death: 1 April 1953 (aged 57–58)
- Place of death: Cathcart, Scotland
- Height: 5 ft 8 in (1.73 m)
- Position: Defender

Senior career*
Years	Team	Apps	(Gls)
1919–1920	Queens Park	38	(1)
1920–1921	Third Lanark	12	(0)
1921–1924	Nelson	50	(0)
1924	Arthurlie	14	(0)
1924–1925	Arsenal	0	(0)
1925–1926	Brentford	16	(0)
- * Club domestic league appearances and goals

John Hay Steel (1895 – 1 April 1953) was a Scottish professional footballer who played in the Football League for Nelson and Brentford as a full back. He also played in his native Scotland for Queen's Park, Third Lanark and Arthurlie.

== Career statistics ==
Appearances and goals by club, season and competition
Club	Season	League			National Cup		Other		Total	
Club	Season	Division	Apps	Goals	Apps	Goals	Apps	Goals	Apps	Goals
Queen's Park	1919–20	Scottish Division One	38	1	3	0	4 (Note: 3 appearances in Glasgow Merchants Charity Cup, 1 appearance in Glasgow Cup)	0	45	1
Third Lanark	1920–21	Scottish Division One	12	0	0	0	—		12	0
Nelson	1921–22	Third Division North	25	0	0	0	—		25	0
Nelson	1922–23	Third Division North	24	0	2	0	—		26	0
Nelson	1923–24	Second Division	1	0	0	0	—		1	0
Nelson	Total		50	0	2	0	—		52	0
Arthurlie	1924–25	Scottish Division Two	14	0	0	0	—		14	0
Brentford	1924–25	Third Division South	16	1	—		—		16	1
Career total			130	2	5	0	4	0	139	2

== Honours ==
Nelson

- Football League Third Division North: 1922–23
