= George Kell (footballer) =

English footballer (1896–1985)

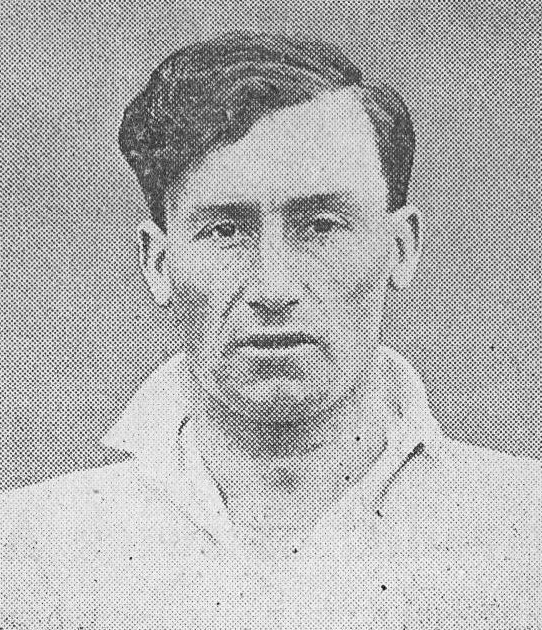
- Kell while with Brentford in 1924

Personal information
- Full name: George Kell
- Date of birth: 13 July 1896
- Place of birth: Gateshead, England
- Date of death: 1985 (aged 88–89)
- Place of death: Sheffield, England height = 5 ft 9 in (1.75 m)
- Position: Full back

Youth career
- Allhusen Works

Senior career*
Years	Team	Apps	(Gls)
1920–1922	The Wednesday	5	(0)
1922–1925	Brentford	76	(0)
1925–1928	Hartlepools United	71	(1)
- Gainsborough Trinity
- * Club domestic league appearances and goals

George Kell (13 July 1896 – 1985) was an English professional footballer who played as a full back in the Football League for Brentford, Hartlepools United and The Wednesday.

== Career statistics ==
Club	Season	League			FA Cup		Total	
Club	Season	Division	Apps	Goals	Apps	Goals	Apps	Goals
The Wednesday	1920–21	Second Division	5	0	1	0	6	0
Brentford	1922–23	Third Division South	17	0	0	0	17	0
Brentford	1923–24	Third Division South	24	0	4	0	28	0
Brentford	1924–25	Third Division South	35	0	1	0	36	0
Brentford	Total		76	0	5	0	81	0
Hartlepools United	1925–26	Third Division North	29	0	3	0	32	0
Hartlepools United	1926–27	Third Division North	33	1	1	0	34	1
Hartlepools United	1927–28	Third Division North	9	0	0	0	9	0
Hartlepools United	Total		71	1	4	0	75	1
Career Total			152	1	10	0	162	1
