= John Pearson (footballer, born 1896) =

English footballer

Personal information
- Full name: John Cecil Pearson
- Date of birth: 14 March 1896
- Place of birth: Dudley, England
- Date of death: 23 November 1979 (aged 83)
- Place of death: Wolverhampton, England
- Height: 5 ft 9 3/4 in (1.77 m)
- Position: Full back

Senior career*
Years	Team	Apps	(Gls)
- Halesowen Town
–1921	Cradley Heath St Luke's		
1921–1923	Burnley	1	(0)
1923–1924	Brentford	26	(0)
1924–1926	Grimsby Town	5	(0)
- * Club domestic league appearances and goals

John Cecil Pearson (14 March 1896 – December 1979) was an English professional footballer who played as a full back in the Football League for Burnley, Brentford and Grimsby Town.

== Career statistics ==
Appearances and goals by club, season and competition
Club	Season	League			FA Cup		Total	
Club	Season	Division	Apps	Goals	Apps	Goals	Apps	Goals
Brentford	1923–24	Third Division South	26	0	4	0	30	0
Career Total			26	0	4	0	30	0
