= Edmund Wright (footballer) =

English footballer

Personal information
- Full name: Edmund Wright
- Date of birth: 7 March 1902
- Place of birth: Leytonstone, England
- Date of death: 1978 (aged 75–76)
- Position: Goalkeeper

Senior career*
| Years | Team | Apps | (Gls) |
- Worcester City
- High Wycombe
| 1919–1921 | Aston Villa | 2 | (0) |
| 1921–1923 | Brentford | 6 | (0) |
- * Club domestic league appearances and goals

Edmund Wright (7 March 1902 – 1978) was an English professional footballer who played as a goalkeeper in the Football League for Brentford and Aston Villa.

== Career statistics ==
Appearances and goals by club, season and competition
| Club | Season | League | | | FA Cup | | Total | |
| Club | Season | Division | Apps | Goals | Apps | Goals | Apps | Goals |
|---|---|---|---|---|---|---|---|---|
| Aston Villa | 1920–21 | First Division | 2 | 0 | 0 | 0 | 2 | 0 |
| Brentford | 1922–23 | Third Division South | 6 | 0 | 0 | 0 | 6 | 0 |
| Career total | | | 8 | 0 | 0 | 0 | 8 | 0 |
