= Billy Broadbent =

English footballer

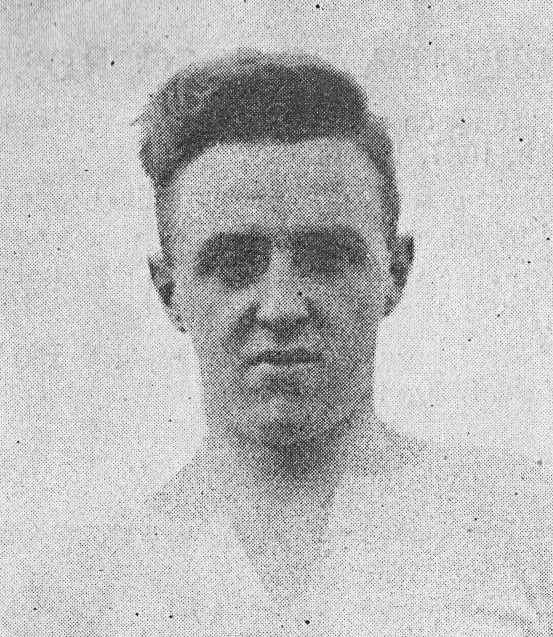
- Broadbent while with Brentford in 1924.

Personal information
- Full name: William Henry Broadbent
- Date of birth: 20 November 1901
- Place of birth: Oldham, England
- Date of death: March 1979 (aged 77)
- Place of death: Lancaster, England
- Height: 5 ft 8 in (1.73 m)
- Position: Utility player

Youth career
- 1919–1920: Wellington Albion

Senior career*
Years	Team	Apps	(Gls)
1920–1924	Oldham Athletic	12	(1)
1924–1925	Brentford	17	(0)
1925–1932	Clapton Orient	198	(8)
1932–1933	Preston North End	2	(0)
- Manchester North End
- * Club domestic league appearances and goals

William Henry Broadbent (20 November 1901 – March 1979) was an English professional footballer who played as a utility player in the Football League, most notably for Clapton Orient. Over the course of his career, Broadbent played every position bar goalkeeper. Broadbent began his sporting career with rugby league club Droylsden.

== Career statistics ==
Appearances and goals by club, season and competition
Club	Season	League			FA Cup		Total	
Club	Season	Division	Apps	Goals	Apps	Goals	Apps	Goals
Oldham Athletic	1920–21	First Division	1	0	0	0	1	0
Oldham Athletic	1921–22	First Division	5	1	0	0	5	1
Oldham Athletic	1922–23	First Division	7	0	0	0	7	0
Oldham Athletic	Total		13	1	0	0	13	1
Brentford	1924–25	Third Division South	17	0	1	0	18	0
Career total			30	1	1	0	21	1
