= Reginald Parker (footballer) =

English footballer

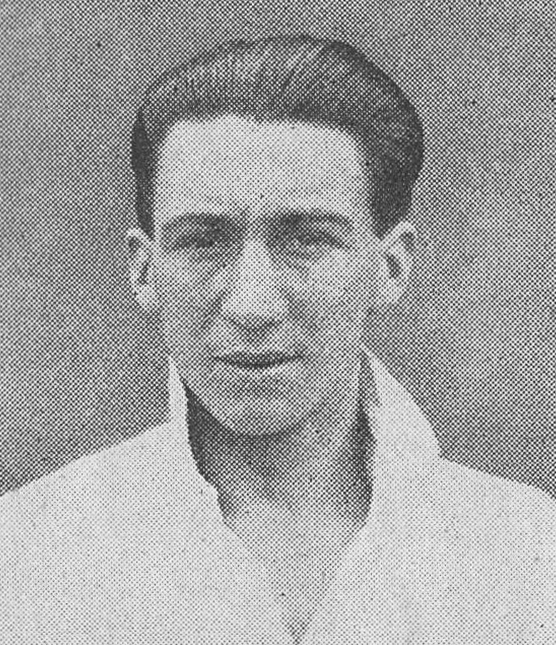
- Parker while with Brentford in 1924.

Personal information
- Full name: Reginald Parker
- Date of birth: 8 July 1902
- Place of birth: Willington Quay, England
- Position: Forward

Senior career*
Years	Team	Apps	(Gls)
- Boldon Comrades
1922–1925	Brentford	99	(32)
1925–1928	South Shields	102	(41)
1928–1929	Merthyr Town	44	(15)
- Tunbridge Wells Rangers
- * Club domestic league appearances and goals

Reginald Parker, sometimes erroneously cited as Richard Parker, was an English footballer who played in the Football League for Brentford, South Shields and Merthyr Town as a forward.

== Career ==
After beginning his career in the northeast with Boldon Comrades, Parker joined Third Division South club Brentford during the 1922 off-season. After a slow start at inside forward, he came to prominence during the 1923–24 season, scoring 20 goals in 43 games and finishing as the team's top scorer. After switching to centre forward, Parker could muster only 9 goals in 42 appearances during the 1924–25 season. After scoring 35 goals in 104 appearances, Parker departed the Bees to join Second Division club South Shields. Parker was top scorer for the team during the 1926–27 season and scored 41 league goals in three seasons with the club. He moved on to spend the 1928–29 season with Third Division South club Merthyr Town, before ending his career with Southern League club Tunbridge Wells Rangers.

== Career statistics ==
Appearances and goals by club, season and competition
Club	Season	League			FA Cup		Total	
Club	Season	Division	Apps	Goals	Apps	Goals	Apps	Goals
Brentford	1922–23	Third Division South	14	4	0	0	14	4
Brentford	1923–24	Third Division South	39	18	4	2	43	20
Brentford	1924–25	Third Division South	41	8	1	1	42	9
Brentford	1925–26	Third Division South	5	2	—		5	2
Career total			99	32	5	3	104	35
