= Vivian Rowe =

English footballer

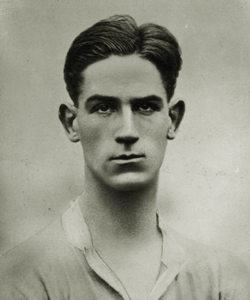
- Rowe while with Wimbledon in 1925.

Personal information
- Full name: Vivian Frederick Rowe
- Date of birth: 18 February 1901
- Place of birth: Lambeth, England
- Date of death: September 1967 (aged 66)
- Place of death: Ashford, England
- Position: Inside forward

Senior career*
| Years | Team | Apps | (Gls) |
| 1921–1924 | Wimbledon | | |
| 1924 | Dulwich Hamlet | | |
| 1924–1925 | Brentford | 4 | (1) |
| 1925–1927 | Hampstead | 12 | (7) |
| 1927–1929 | Wimbledon | | |
| 1932–1933 | Hampstead | 1 | (0) |
- * Club domestic league appearances and goals

Vivian Frederick Rowe (18 February 1901 – September 1967) was an English amateur footballer who played in the Football League for Brentford as an inside forward.

== Personal life ==
Rowe was the uncle of table tennis sisters Rosalind and Diane Rowe. His younger brother, Ronald, was also an amateur footballer.

== Career statistics ==
Appearances and goals by club, season and competition
| Club | Season | League | | | FA Cup | | Other | | Total | |
| Club | Season | Division | Apps | Goals | Apps | Goals | Apps | Goals | Apps | Goals |
|---|---|---|---|---|---|---|---|---|---|---|
| Brentford | 1924–25 | Third Division South | 4 | 1 | 0 | 0 | ― | | 4 | 1 |
| Hampstead | 1924–25 | Athenian League | 6 | 4 | 0 | 0 | 1 (Note: Appearance in Middlesex Senior Cup) | 0 | 7 | 4 |
| Hampstead | 1925–26 | Athenian League | 2 | 3 | 0 | 0 | 1 (Note: Appearance in Middlesex Senior Charity Cup) | 0 | 3 | 3 |
| Hampstead | 1926–27 | Athenian League | 4 | 0 | 0 | 0 | 1 | 0 | 5 | 0 |
| Hampstead | 1927–28 | Athenian League | 0 | 0 | 0 | 0 | 1 | 1 | 1 | 1 |
| Hampstead | Total | | 12 | 7 | 0 | 0 | 4 | 1 | 16 | 8 |
| Hampstead | 1932–33 | Athenian League | 1 | 0 | 0 | 0 | 0 | 0 | 1 | 0 |
| Hampstead | Total | | 13 | 7 | 0 | 0 | 4 | 1 | 17 | 8 |
| Career total | | | 17 | 8 | 0 | 0 | 4 | 1 | 21 | 9 |
