= John Thain (footballer) =

English footballer

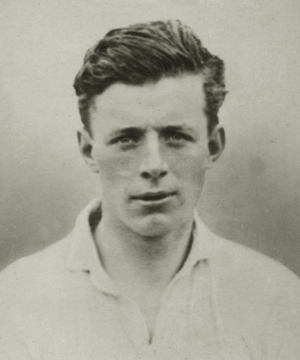
- Thain while with Brentford in 1922

Personal information
- Full name: John William Thain
- Date of birth: 3 February 1903
- Place of birth: Pelaw, England
- Date of death: December 1977 (aged 74)
- Place of death: Peterborough, England
- Height: 5 ft 9 1/2 in (1.77 m)
- Position: Outside right

Youth career
- Pelaw Juniors

Senior career*
Years	Team	Apps	(Gls)
1921–1922	Newcastle United	1	(0)
1922–1923	Brentford	5	(1)
- Peterborough & Fletton United
1925	Grimsby Town	26	(4)
- Peterborough & Fletton United
- * Club domestic league appearances and goals

John William Thain (3 February 1903 – December 1977) was an English professional footballer who played as an outside right in the Football League for Brentford, Grimsby Town and Newcastle United.

== Career statistics ==
Appearances and goals by club, season and competition
Club	Season	League			FA Cup		Total	
Club	Season	Division	Apps	Goals	Apps	Goals	Apps	Goals
Newcastle United	1921–22	First Division	1	0	0	0	1	0
Brentford	1922–23	Third Division South	5	1	0	0	5	1
Career total			6	1	0	0	6	1
