= Jimmy McCree =

Scottish footballer

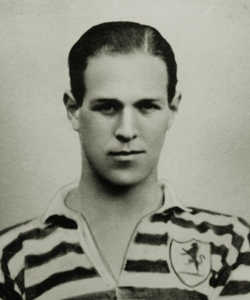
- McCree while with London Caledonians in 1924.

Personal information
- Full name: James McCree
- Date of birth: 16 November 1902
- Place of birth: Cathcart, Scotland
- Date of death: 21 October 1984 (aged 81)
- Place of death: Surrey, England
- Position: Half back

Senior career*
Years	Team	Apps	(Gls)
	Queen's Park	0	(0)
- London Caledonians
1925	Brentford	3	(0)
1923–1925	London Caledonians		
1925	Fulham	2	(0)
1926	Watford	0	(0)
- London Caledonians
1927	Middlesbrough	0	(0)

International career
1930	Scotland Amateurs	1	(0)
- * Club domestic league appearances and goals

James McCree (16 November 1902 – 21 October 1984) was a Scottish amateur footballer who played as a half back in the Football League for West London rivals Brentford and Fulham. Playing for most of his career as an amateur, he also represented Civil Service and London Caledonians, winning silverware with the latter club. McCree played for Scotland Amateurs in a match against England Amateurs on 14 March 1930.

== Career statistics ==
Appearances and goals by club, season and competition
Club	Season	League			National Cup		Total	
Club	Season	Division	Apps	Goals	Apps	Goals	Apps	Goals
Brentford	1924–25	Third Division South	3	0	—		3	0
Fulham	1925-26	Second Division	2	0	0	0	2	0
Career total			5	0	0	0	5	0

== Honours ==
London Caledonians

- FA Amateur Cup: 1922–23
- Isthmian League: 1924–25
