= 1921–22 Aberdare Athletic F.C. season =

Aberdare Athletic
1921–22 season
- Manager: William Lot
- Third Division South: 8th
- FA Cup: Extra preliminary round
- Biggest win: 6–1 vs Gillingham
- Biggest defeat: 1–5 vs Bristol Rovers
| Home colours | Away colours |

The 1921–22 season was Aberdare Athletic's first season in the Football League. They were founder members of the new Football League Third Division South.

== Season review ==
=== League ===
==== Results summary ====
Note: Two points for a win

| Overall | | | | | | | | Home | | | | | | Away | | | | | |
| Pld | W | D | L | GF | GA | Ave | Pts | W | D | L | GF | GA | Ave | W | D | L | GF | GA | Ave |
|---|---|---|---|---|---|---|---|---|---|---|---|---|---|---|---|---|---|---|---|
| 42 | 17 | 10 | 15 | 57 | 51 | 1.12 | 44 | 11 | 6 | 4 | 38 | 18 | 2.11 | 6 | 4 | 11 | 19 | 33 | 0.58 |

Last updated: 6 May 1922.

==== Results by round ====
| Round | 1 | 2 | 3 | 4 | 5 | 6 | 7 | 8 | 9 | 10 | 11 | 12 | 13 | 14 | 15 | 16 | 17 | 18 | 19 | 20 | 21 | 22 | 23 | 24 | 25 | 26 | 27 | 28 | 29 | 30 | 31 | 32 | 33 | 34 | 35 | 36 | 37 | 38 | 39 | 40 | 41 | 42 |
|---|---|---|---|---|---|---|---|---|---|---|---|---|---|---|---|---|---|---|---|---|---|---|---|---|---|---|---|---|---|---|---|---|---|---|---|---|---|---|---|---|---|---|
| Ground | H | A | A | H | H | A | H | A | H | A | A | H | H | A | A | H | A | H | A | A | H | H | A | A | H | A | H | A | A | H | A | H | A | H | H | A | A | H | H | A | H | H |
| Result | D | W | D | W | W | W | W | L | D | L | L | W | W | L | L | D | D | L | W | L | W | W | L | W | D | L | W | L | W | L | D | W | L | W | D | D | L | L | D | W | W | L |
| Position | 7 | 5 | 9 | 3 | 2 | 4 | 2 | 5 | 6 | 6 | 7 | 6 | 6 | 7 | 7 | 7 | 7 | 8 | 7 | 9 | 6 | 6 | 7 | 6 | 7 | 10 | 6 | 8 | 7 | 7 | 7 | 6 | 8 | 6 | 6 | 6 | 6 | 7 | 8 | 7 | 6 | 8 |

Updated to match(es) played on 6 May 1922. Source: statto.com
A = Away; H = Home; W = Win; D = Draw; L = Loss

== Fixtures and results ==
=== Third Division South ===
| Date | Opponents | Venue | Result | Scorers | Attendance |
|---|---|---|---|---|---|
| 27 Aug 1921 | Portsmouth | H | 0–0 | | |
| 29 Aug 1921 | Swansea Town | A | 2–1 | | |
| 3 Sep 1921 | Portsmouth | A | 2–2 | | |
| 5 Sep 1921 | Swansea Town | H | 2–1 | | |
| 10 Sep 1921 | Brighton & Hove Albion | H | 2–0 | | |
| 17 Sep 1921 | Brighton & Hove Albion | A | 2–1 | | |
| 24 Sep 1921 | Watford | H | 3–0 | | |
| 1 Oct 1921 | Watford | A | 0–3 | | |
| 8 Oct 1921 | Charlton Athletic | H | 3–3 | | |
| 15 Oct 1921 | Charlton Athletic | A | 1–2 | | |
| 22 Oct 1921 | Northampton Town | A | 0–2 | | |
| 29 Oct 1921 | Northampton Town | H | 4–2 | | |
| 5 Nov 1921 | Queens Park Rangers | H | 4–2 | | |
| 12 Nov 1921 | Queens Park Rangers | A | 0–1 | | |
| 19 Nov 1921 | Southend United | A | 2–3 | | |
| 26 Nov 1921 | Southend United | H | 1–1 | | |
| 10 Dec 1921 | Norwich City | A | 0–0 | | |
| 17 Dec 1921 | Reading | H | 0–1 | | |
| 24 Dec 1921 | Reading | A | 1–0 | | |
| 26 Dec 1921 | Brentford | A | 1–2 | | |
| 27 Dec 1921 | Brentford | H | 2–0 | | |
| 31 Dec 1921 | Bristol Rovers | H | 2–0 | | |
| 14 Jan 1922 | Bristol Rovers | A | 1–5 | | |
| 28 Jan 1922 | Merthyr Town | A | 1–0 | | |
| 4 Feb 1922 | Plymouth Argyle | H | 0–0 | | |
| 11 Feb 1922 | Plymouth Argyle | A | 0–3 | | |
| 18 Feb 1922 | Newport County | H | 3–0 | | 7.000 |
| 25 Feb 1922 | Newport County | A | 0–1 | | 9.000 |
| 11 Mar 1922 | Luton Town | A | 2–1 | | |
| 16 Mar 1922 | Norwich City | H | 1–2 | | |
| 18 Mar 1922 | Swindon Town | A | 2–2 | | |
| 25 Mar 1922 | Swindon Town | H | 3–2 | | |
| 1 Apr 1922 | Gillingham | A | 1–3 | | |
| 8 Apr 1922 | Gillingham | H | 6–1 | | |
| 10 Apr 1922 | Merthyr Town | H | 0–0 | | |
| 15 Apr 1922 | Millwall | A | 0–0 | | |
| 17 Apr 1922 | Southampton | A | 0–1 | | |
| 18 Apr 1922 | Southampton | H | 0–1 | | |
| 22 Apr 1922 | Millwall | H | 0–0 | | |
| 29 Apr 1922 | Exeter City | A | 1–0 | | |
| 1 May 1922 | Luton Town | H | 2–0 | | |
| 6 May 1922 | Exeter City | H | 0–2 | | |

== League table ==
| Pos | Team | Pld | W | D | L | GF | GA | GD | Pts |
|---|---|---|---|---|---|---|---|---|---|
| 6 | Swindon Town | 42 | 16 | 13 | 13 | 72 | 60 | +12 | 45 |
| 7 | Watford | 42 | 13 | 18 | 11 | 54 | 48 | +6 | 44 |
| 8 | Aberdare Athletic (Note: New club in the league; elected from Southern League) | 42 | 17 | 10 | 15 | 57 | 51 | +6 | 44 |
| 9 | Brentford | 42 | 16 | 11 | 15 | 52 | 43 | +9 | 43 |
| 10 | Swansea Town | 42 | 13 | 15 | 14 | 50 | 47 | +3 | 41 |
