= Charles Alton =

English footballer

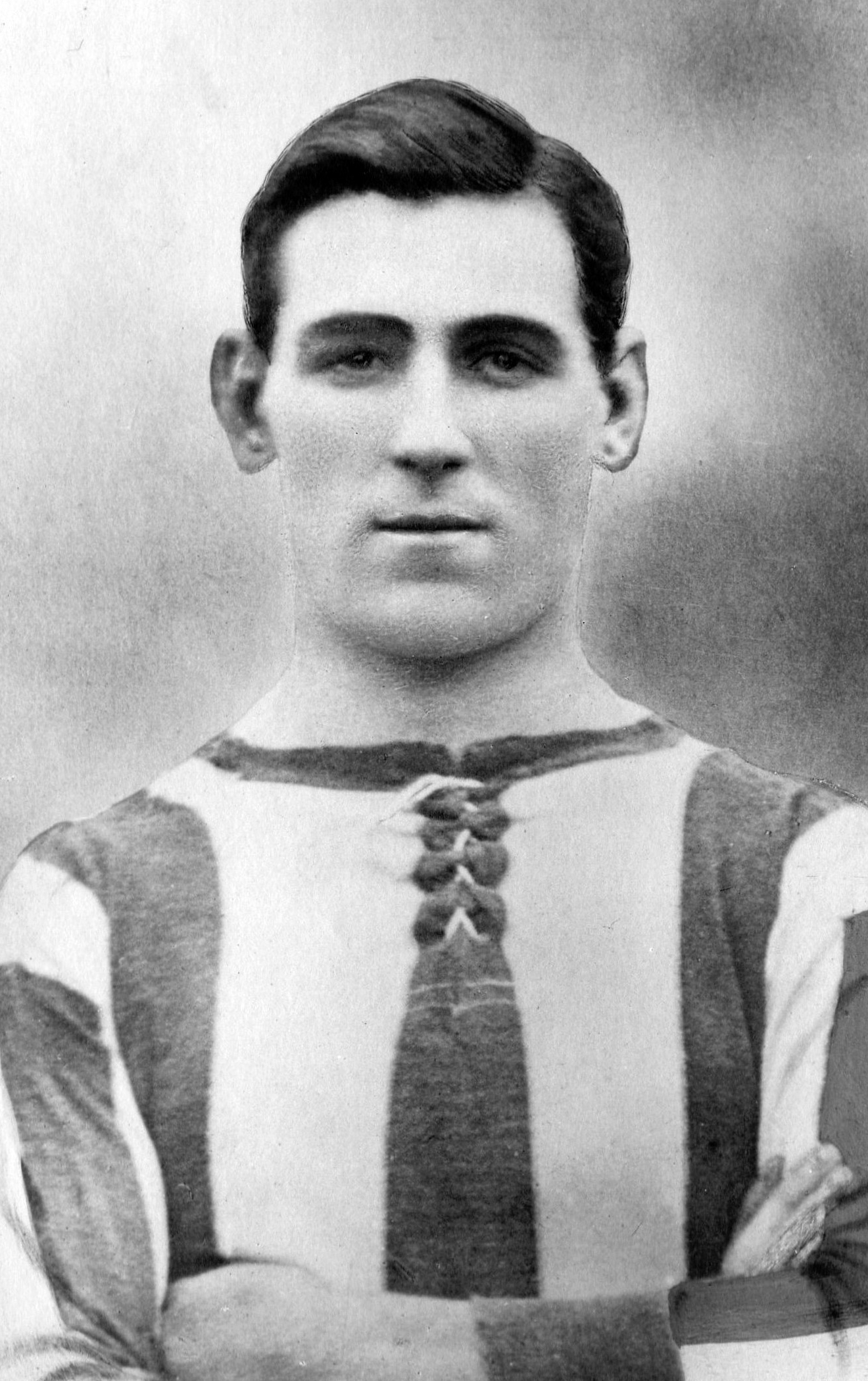
- Alton while with Brentford in 1922.

Personal information
- Full name: Charles Alton
- Date of birth: 24 December 1891
- Place of birth: Brampton, England
- Date of death: 22 September 1969 (aged 77)
- Place of death: Birmingham, England
- Position: Full back

Senior career*
Years	Team	Apps	(Gls)
- Spital Olympic
1912–1914	Chesterfield Town	4	(0)
1914–1915	Castleford Town		
1915	Stalybridge Celtic		
1915–1916	Doncaster Rovers		(0)
1918–1921	Rotherham County	55	(1)
1921–1925	Brentford	126	(5)
1925–1926	Northfleet United		
- * Club domestic league appearances and goals

Charles Alton (24 December 1891 – 22 September 1969) was an English footballer who played as a full back in the Football League for Rotherham County and Brentford.

== Career ==
A full back, Alton began his career with spells at Spital Olympic, Chesterfield Town, Castleford Town, Doncaster Rovers and Stalybridge Celtic prior to the outbreak of the First World War in 1914. He signed for Second Division club Rotherham County in 1919 and made 55 appearances, scoring one goal during two seasons with the club. Alton joined Third Division South club Brentford in 1921 and he was a virtual ever-present during his time at Griffin Park, making 133 appearances and scoring six goals (all from penalties) before being given a free transfer in August 1925. He ended his career with a spell at Southern League club Northfleet United.

== Personal life ==
Alton served as a corporal in the Royal Engineers during the First World War.

== Career statistics ==
Appearances and goals by club, season and competition
Club	Season	League			FA Cup		Total	
Club	Season	Division	Apps	Goals	Apps	Goals	Apps	Goals
Chesterfield Town	1912–13	Midland League	4	0	0	0	4	0
Brentford	1921–22	Third Division South	36	0	3	0	39	0
Brentford	1922–23	Third Division South	42	3	3	1	45	4
Brentford	1923–24	Third Division South	31	2	0	0	31	2
Brentford	1924–25	Third Division South	17	0	1	0	18	0
Brentford	Total		126	5	7	1	133	6
Career total			130	5	7	1	137	6
