= 1922–23 Brentford F.C. season =

English football team season

Brentford
1922–23 season
- Chairman: George Pauling
- Manager: Archie Mitchell
- Stadium: Griffin Park
- Third Division South: 14th
- FA Cup: Sixth qualifying round
- Top goalscorer: League: Morris (13); All: Morris (13)
- Highest home attendance: 16,000
- Lowest home attendance: 4,000
- Average home league attendance: 8,350
Home colours

During the 1922–23 English football season, Brentford competed in the Football League Third Division South and finished in 14th place.

== Season summary ==
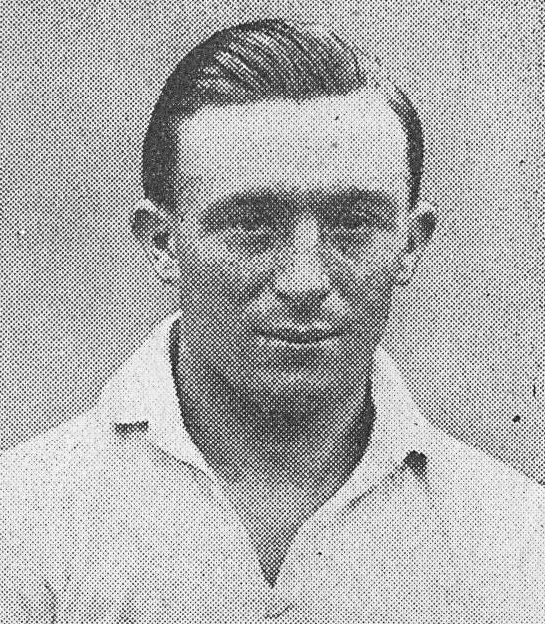
Inside forward Billy Clayson was one of the few successful signings of Brentford's early years in the Football League.

After a promising 9th-place finish at the end of the 1921–22 Third Division South season, Brentford player-manager Archie Mitchell retired from playing in order to concentrate solely on management. Financial problems during the off-season meant that the squad was hit by the triple-departure of forwards Harry Anstiss, George Pither and long-serving wing half Alf Amos to league rivals Millwall. The previous season's leading goalscorer Harry Morris was successfully retained and the money generated from the sales allowed the squad's wages to be paid through the off-season. 11 new players were transferred in, with a contingent from the North East, including full back George Kell, half backs Bill Inglis and John Haggan and forwards Gordon Johnstone, Reginald Parker, Harry Stott and John Thain. Trainer Michael Whitham was replaced by former Bees manager Dusty Rhodes.

Despite Harry Morris scoring 10 goals in an 11 match spell early in the season, by early November 1921, Brentford were rooted in mid-table. A failure to convert draws into wins dropped the club down to 18th on Christmas Day and the sales of Harry Morris to Millwall and long-serving full back Bertie Rosier to Clapton Orient in February 1923 exacerbated the team's problems scoring and conceding goals. Though never looking in any danger of having to seek re-election, a run of goals from Gordon Johnstone and Reginald Parker inspired a seven match unbeaten spell from mid-March to mid-April which lifted Brentford to 14th. Three draws and two defeats in the final five matches of the season saw the Bees secure a 14th-place finish.

== League table ==
Pos	Team	Pld	W	D	L	GF	GA	GAv	Pts
12	Charlton Athletic	42	14	14	14	55	51	1.078	42
13	Bristol Rovers	42	13	16	13	35	36	0.972	42
14	Brentford	42	13	12	17	41	51	0.804	38
15	Southend United	42	12	13	17	49	54	0.907	37
16	Gillingham	42	15	7	20	51	59	0.864	37

== Results ==
Brentford's goal tally listed first.

=== Legend ===
Win	Draw	Loss

=== Football League Third Division South ===
No.	Date	Opponent	Venue	Result	Attendance	Scorer(s)
1	26 August 1922	Gillingham	A	0–2	9,000	
2	28 August 1922	Luton Town	H	3–2	8,000	Morris (3)
3	2 September 1922	Gillingham	H	2–0	10,000	Morris, Haggan
4	4 September 1922	Luton Town	A	0–4	11,000	
5	9 September 1922	Norwich City	A	2–0	8,597	Morris, Clayson
6	11 September 1922	Queens Park Rangers	H	1–3	15,000	Clayson
7	16 September 1922	Norwich City	H	1–4	7,000	Alton (pen)
8	23 September 1922	Northampton Town	A	1–1	8,000	Johnstone
9	30 September 1922	Northampton Town	H	2–1	7,000	Clayson, Morris
10	7 October 1922	Exeter City	A	2–0	6,000	Morris (2)
11	14 October 1922	Exeter City	H	0–1	7,000	
12	21 October 1922	Brighton & Hove Albion	A	1–2	8,000	Capper
13	28 October 1922	Brighton & Hove Albion	H	1–2	7,000	Morris
14	4 November 1922	Merthyr Town	H	3–1	6,000	Hendren, Morris, Alton (pen)
15	11 November 1922	Merthyr Town	A	0–1	5,000	
16	18 November 1922	Reading	H	1–1	6,000	Clayson
17	25 November 1922	Reading	A	0–1	5,000	
18	9 December 1922	Queens Park Rangers	A	1–1	19,000	Clayson
19	23 December 1922	Bristol Rovers	H	0–1	10,000	
20	25 December 1922	Watford	A	0–2	8,000	
21	26 December 1922	Watford	H	2–1	10,000	Morris, Duncan
22	6 January 1923	Plymouth Argyle	H	2–0	14,000	Morris, Duncan
23	20 January 1923	Charlton Athletic	A	1–1	6,464	Hendren
24	27 January 1923	Charlton Athletic	H	0–3	9,000	
25	3 February 1923	Swindon Town	A	0–3	9,000	
26	10 February 1923	Swindon Town	H	3–0	4,000	Thain, Mulford, Morris
27	17 February 1923	Aberdare Athletic	A	0–0	6,000	
28	24 February 1923	Aberdare Athletic	H	0–1	5,000	
29	3 March 1923	Swansea Town	A	0–0	6,000	
30	10 March 1923	Swansea Town	H	0–1	4,000	
31	17 February 1923	Newport County	H	0–0	5,000	
32	24 March 1923	Newport County	A	1–0	4,000	James
33	30 March 1923	Southend United	H	0–0	6,000	
34	31 March 1923	Bristol City	H	4–0	9,500	Johnstone (2), Parker (2)
35	2 April 1923	Southend United	A	2–1	10,000	Clayson, Alton (pen)
36	7 April 1923	Bristol City	H	1–1	16,000	Johnstone
37	14 April 1923	Portsmouth	H	1–0	7,000	Parker
38	21 April 1923	Portsmouth	A	0–3	8,106	
39	28 April 1923	Millwall	H	1–1	12,000	Parker
40	30 April 1923	Bristol Rovers	A	1–1	2,000	Johnstone
41	2 May 1923	Plymouth Argyle	A	0–3	7,000	
42	5 May 1923	Millwall	H	1–1	12,000	Johnstone

=== FA Cup ===
Round	Date	Opponent	Venue	Result	Attendance	Scorer(s)
5QR	2 December 1922	Maidstone United	A	0–0	10,500	
5QR (replay)	6 December 1922	Maidstone United	H	4–0	5,408	Clayson (2), Mulford, Alton (pen)
6QR	16 December 1922	Merthyr Town	H	0–1	12,000	

- Sources: 100 Years of Brentford, Brentford Football Club History, The Complete History

== Playing squad ==
Players' ages are as of the opening day of the 1922–23 season.

Pos.	Name	Nat.	Date of birth (age)	Signed from	Signed in	Notes
Goalkeepers
GK	Edmund Wright	(England)	7 March 1902 (aged 20)	Aston Villa	1921	
GK	William Young	(England)	4 August 1892 (aged 30)	South Shields	1920	
Defenders
DF	Philip Allen	(England)	5 November 1902 (aged 19)	Grenadier Guards	1922	
DF	Charles Alton	(England)	24 December 1891 (aged 30)	Rotherham County	1921	
DF	George Kell	(England)	13 July 1896 (aged 26)	The Wednesday	1922	
Midfielders
HB	John Haggan	(England)	16 December 1896 (aged 25)	Sunderland	1922	
HB	Cyril Hunter	(England)	8 February 1898 (aged 24)	Leadgate Park	1921	
HB	Bill Inglis	(England)	4 September 1899 (aged 22)	Derby County	1922	
HB	Roland James	(England)	4 May 1897 (aged 25)	West Bromwich Albion	1922	
HB	James Kerr	(Scotland)	7 April 1894 (aged 28)	Blackburn Rovers	1921	
Forwards
FW	Freddy Capper (c)	(England)	8 May 1892 (aged 31)	The Wednesday	1921	
FW	Billy Clayson	(England)	12 July 1897 (aged 25)	Wellingborough Town	1922	
FW	Peter Duncan	(Scotland)	1 July 1890 (aged 32)	Blackburn Rovers	1922	
FW	Thomas Elliott	(England)	6 April 1890 (aged 32)	Nottingham Forest	1921	
FW	Patsy Hendren	(England)	5 February 1889 (aged 33)	Queens Park Rangers	1911	Played when his cricket commitments allowed
FW	Gordon Johnstone	(England)	21 April 1900 (aged 22)	Houghton Rovers	1922	
FW	Horace Jones	(England)	n/a	Ton Pentre	1922	
FW	Sidney Mulford	(England)	23 November 1896 (aged 25)	Kew Association	1922	
FW	Reginald Parker	(England)	8 July 1902 (aged 20)	Boldon Comrades	1922	
FW	Harry Stott	(England)	24 April 1899 (aged 23)	Aston Villa	1922	
FW	John Thain	(England)	3 February 1903 (aged 19)	Newcastle United	1922	
Players who left the club mid-season
DF	Bertie Rosier	(England)	21 March 1893 (aged 29)	Southall	1913	Transferred to Clapton Orient
FW	Harry Morris	(England)	25 November 1897 (aged 24)	Fulham	1921	Transferred to Millwall

- Sources: 100 Years of Brentford, Timeless Bees, Football League Players' Records 1888 to 1939, 100 Years Of Brentford

== Coaching staff ==
Name	Role
(England) Archie Mitchell	Manager
(England) Dusty Rhodes	Trainer

== Statistics ==
=== Appearances and goals ===

Brentford's highest appearance-makers in each position during the Football League season.

Pos	Nat	Name	League		FA Cup		Total	
Pos	Nat	Name	Apps	Goals	Apps	Goals	Apps	Goals
GK	(England)	Edmund Wright	6	0	0	0	6	0
GK	(England)	William Young	36	0	3	0	39	0
DF	(England)	Philip Allen	1	0	0	0	1	0
DF	(England)	Charles Alton	42	3	3	1	45	4
DF	(England)	George Kell	17	0	0	0	17	0
DF	(England)	Bertie Rosier	24	0	3	0	27	0
HB	(England)	John Haggan	18	1	3	0	21	1
HB	(England)	Cyril Hunter	26	0	0	0	26	0
HB	(England)	Bill Inglis	25	0	3	0	28	0
HB	(England)	Roland James	20	1	1	0	21	1
HB	(Scotland)	James Kerr	42	0	2	0	44	0
FW	(England)	Freddy Capper	38	1	3	0	41	1
FW	(England)	Billy Clayson	29	6	3	2	32	8
FW	(Scotland)	Peter Duncan	13	2	0	0	13	2
FW	(England)	Thomas Elliott	10	0	3	0	13	0
FW	(England)	Patsy Hendren	25	2	3	0	28	2
FW	(England)	Gordon Johnstone	14	6	0	0	14	6
FW	(England)	Horace Jones	3	0	0	0	3	0
FW	(England)	Harry Morris	23	13	1	0	24	13
FW	(England)	Sidney Mulford	7	1	2	1	9	2
FW	(England)	Reginald Parker	14	4	0	0	14	4
FW	(England)	Harry Stott	24	0	0	0	24	0
FW	(England)	John Thain	5	1	0	0	5	1

- Players listed in italics left the club mid-season.
- Source: 100 Years of Brentford

=== Goalscorers ===
Pos.	Nat	Player	FL3	FAC	Total
FW	(England)	Harry Morris	13	0	13
FW	(England)	Thomas Elliott	8	1	9
FW	(England)	Billy Clayson	6	2	8
FW	(England)	Gordon Johnstone	6	0	6
FW	(England)	Reginald Parker	4	0	4
DF	(England)	Charles Alton	3	1	4
FW	(Scotland)	Peter Duncan	2	0	2
FW	(England)	Patsy Hendren	2	0	2
FW	(England)	Sidney Mulford	1	1	2
FW	(England)	Freddy Capper	1	0	1
HB	(England)	John Haggan	1	0	1
HB	(England)	Roland James	1	0	1
FW	(England)	John Thain	1	0	1
Total			41	4	45

- Players listed in italics left the club mid-season.
- Source: 100 Years of Brentford

=== Management ===
Name	Nat	From	To	Record All Comps					Record League				
Name	Nat	From	To	P	W	D	L	W %	P	W	D	L	W %
Archie Mitchell	(England)	26 August 1922	5 May 1923	45	14	13	18	31.11|	42	13	12	17	30.95

=== Summary ===
Games played	45 (42 Third Division South, 3 FA Cup)
Games won	14 (13 Third Division South, 1 FA Cup)
Games drawn	13 (12 Third Division South, 1 FA Cup)
Games lost	18 (17 Third Division South, 1 FA Cup)
Goals scored	45 (41 Third Division South, 4 FA Cup)
Goals conceded	52 (51 Third Division South, 1 FA Cup)
Clean sheets	14 (12 Third Division South, 2 FA Cup)
Biggest league win	4–0 versus Bristol City, 31 March 1923
Worst league defeat	4–0 versus Luton Town, 4 September 1922
Most appearances	45, Charles Alton (42 Third Division South, 3 FA Cup)
Top scorer (league)	13, Harry Morris
Top scorer (all competitions)	13, Harry Morris

== Transfers and loans ==
Cricketers are not included in this list.

Players transferred in
Date	Pos.	Name	Previous club	Fee	Ref.
May 1922	HB	(England) Bill Inglis	(England) Derby County	n/a	
May 1922	HB	(England) John Thain	(England) Newcastle United	n/a	
July 1922	DF	(England) George Kell	(England) The Wednesday	n/a	
August 1922	FW	(England) Horace Jones	(Wales) Ton Pentre	n/a	
1922	DF	(England) Philip Allen	(England) Grenadier Guards	n/a	
1922	FW	(England) Billy Clayson	(England) Wellingborough Town	n/a	
1922	FW	(Scotland) Peter Duncan	(England) Blackburn Rovers	n/a	
1922	HB	(England) John Haggan	(England) Sunderland	n/a	
1922	HB	(England) Roland James	(England) West Bromwich Albion	n/a	
1922	FW	(England) Gordon Johnstone	(England) Houghton Rovers	n/a	
1922	FW	(England) Sidney Mulford	(England) Kew Association	n/a	
1922	FW	(England) Reginald Parker	(England) Boldon Comrades	n/a	
1922	HB	(England) Peter Scott	(England) Newcastle United	n/a	
1922	FW	(England) Harry Stott	(England) Aston Villa	n/a	
Players transferred out
Date	Pos.	Name	Subsequent club	Fee	Ref.
20 May 1922	FW	(England) George Pither	(England) Millwall	n/a	
May 1922	DF	(England) Alf Amos	(England) Millwall	n/a	
May 1922	FW	(England) Harry Anstiss	(England) Millwall	£650	
February 1923	FW	(England) Harry Morris	(England) Millwall	£750	
February 1923	DF	(England) Bertie Rosier	(England) Clapton Orient	n/a	
Players released
Date	Pos.	Name	Subsequent club	Join date	Ref.
May 1923	FW	(Scotland) Peter Duncan	(Scotland) Armadale	17 July 1923	
May 1923	FW	(England) Thomas Elliott	(England) Durham City	September 1923	
May 1923	HB	(England) John Haggan	(England) Preston Colliery	1923	
May 1923	HB	(England) Peter Scott	(England) Preston Colliery	1923	
May 1923	FW	(England) Harry Stott	(England) Preston Colliery	1923	
May 1923	FW	(England) John Thain	(England) Peterborough & Fletton United	1923	
May 1923	GK	(England) Edmund Wright	Retired		
