= William Relph =

English footballer

Personal information
- Full name: William Relph
- Date of birth: 26 January 1900
- Place of birth: Morpeth, England
- Date of death: September 1978 (aged 78)
- Place of death: Newcastle upon Tyne, England
- Height: 5 ft 9 in (1.75 m)
- Position: Outside forward

Senior career*
Years	Team	Apps	(Gls)
1919–1920	Seaton Delaval		
1920–1921	Blyth Spartans		
1921–1924	Ashington	32	(14)
1924–1926	Brentford	7	(1)
1926–1930	Blyth Spartans		
1930–1931	Morpeth Church Institute		
1931–1933	Pegswood United		
- Morpeth Town
- * Club domestic league appearances and goals

William Relph (26 January 1900 – September 1978) was an English professional footballer who played in the Football League for Ashington and Brentford as a forward.

== Career statistics ==
Appearances and goals by club, season and competition
Club	Season	League			FA Cup		Total	
Club	Season	Division	Apps	Goals	Apps	Goals	Apps	Goals
Brentford	1924–25	Third Division South	7	1	1	0	8	1
Career total			7	1	1	0	8	1

== Honours ==
Blyth Spartans

- Northumberland Aged Miners Homes Cup: 1919–20, 1920–21 (joint winners)
