= Tom Garnish =

English footballer

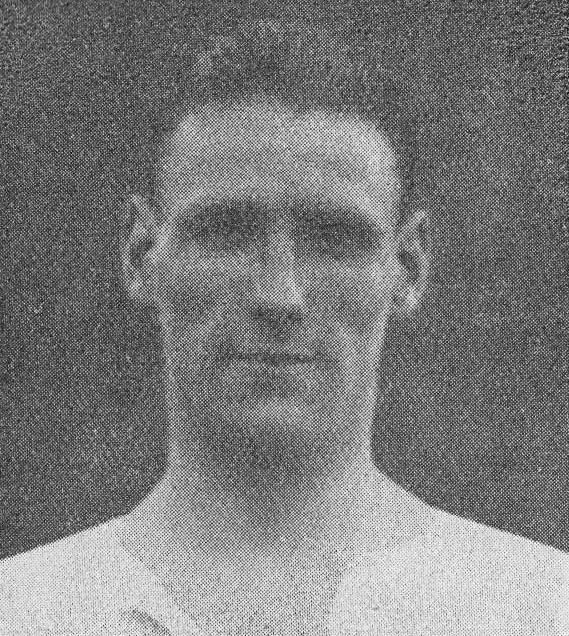
- Garnish while with Brentford in 1924.

Personal information
- Full name: Thomas Frederick Garnish
- Date of birth: 3 May 1900
- Place of birth: Wandsworth, England
- Date of death: 1991 (aged 90–91)
- Position: Outside right

Senior career*
Years	Team	Apps	(Gls)
–1923	Wandsworth		
1923–1925	Brentford	44	(5)
1925–1926	Fulham	1	(0)
- Sheppey United
- * Club domestic league appearances and goals

Tom Frederick Garnish (3 May 1900 – 1991) was an English professional footballer who played as an outside right in the Football League for Brentford and Fulham.

== Club career ==
=== Brentford ===
After beginning his career in non-League football with hometown club Wandsworth, Garnish signed for Third Division South club Brentford in 1923. He joined at a time when the club was at a low ebb and made 46 appearances, scoring 6 goals, in two seasons at Griffin Park, before departing in September 1925.

=== Fulham ===
Garnish joined Brentford's West London rivals Fulham on trial in September 1925. He made just one Second Division appearance before departing the following year.

=== Sheppey United ===
Garnish dropped back into non-League football to join Kent League First Division club Sheppey United in 1926. He won the league title and promotion to the Southern League with the club in the 1927–28 season.

== Honours ==
Sheppey United

- Kent League First Division: 1927–28

== Career statistics ==
Appearances and goals by club, season and competition
Club	Season	League			FA Cup		Total	
Club	Season	Division	Apps	Goals	Apps	Goals	Apps	Goals
Brentford	1923–24	Third Division South	19	1	1	0	20	1
Brentford	1924–25	Third Division South	25	4	1	1	26	5
Brentford	Total		44	5	2	1	46	6
Fulham	1924–25	Second Division	1	0	0	0	1	0
Career Total			45	5	2	1	47	6
