= Albert Gilbert (footballer) =

English footballer

Personal information
- Full name: Albert George Gilbert
- Date of birth: 9 February 1892
- Place of birth: Harrow, England
- Date of death: 18 January 1955 (aged 62)
- Place of death: Ealing, England
- Position: Goalkeeper

Senior career*
Years	Team	Apps	(Gls)
- Civil Service
1924–1925	Brentford	10	(0)
- Park Royal
- * Club domestic league appearances and goals

Albert George Gilbert (9 February 1892 – 18 January 1955) was an English professional footballer who played in the Football League for Brentford as a goalkeeper.

== Career statistics ==
Appearances and goals by club, season and competition
Club	Season	League			FA Cup		Total	
Club	Season	Division	Apps	Goals	Apps	Goals	Apps	Goals
Brentford	1924–25	Third Division South	10	0	1	0	10	0
Career total			10	0	1	0	10	0
