= Bert Gower =

English footballer and cricketer

Personal information
- Full name: Herbert Henry Gower
- Date of birth: 26 March 1899
- Place of birth: Brentford, England
- Date of death: 23 August 1959 (aged 60)
- Place of death: Harrogate, England
- Position: Full back

Senior career*
Years	Team	Apps	(Gls)
- Ealing Celtic
1923–1924	Brentford	2	(0)
1924–1925	Southall		
- Dulwich Hamlet
- Botwell Mission
- Dulwich Hamlet
1929–1932	Hayes	159	(24)
1932–1934	Uxbridge Town		

Managerial career
- 1934–1935: Uxbridge Town
- 1935–1936: Hayes
- * Club domestic league appearances and goals

Herbert Henry Gower (26 March 1899 – 23 August 1959), sometimes known as Nobby Gower, was an English amateur footballer and cricketer. As a footballer, he made two appearances in the Football League for Brentford and then embarked on a 10-year career in amateur football. Gower later opened the batting and kept wicket for Hayes Cricket Club.

== Personal life ==
Gower worked for the Civil Service and lived in Central Avenue, Hayes until 1939. Upon the outbreak of the Second World War that year, Gower's Civil Service department was relocated to Harrogate and he later settled there permanently. His son Phil was killed in an accident in 1943, while training with the Royal Navy Commandos in the New Forest.

== Career statistics ==
Appearances and goals by club, season and competition
Club	Season	League			FA Cup		Total	
Club	Season	Division	Apps	Goals	Apps	Goals	Apps	Goals
Brentford	1923–24	Third Division South	2	0	0	0	2	0
Career total			2	0	0	0	2	0

== Honours ==
Southall

- Middlesex Senior Charity Cup: 1923–24 (shared)

Hayes

- London Senior Cup: 1931–32
- Middlesex Senior Cup: 1930–31
