= Philip Allen (footballer) =

English footballer

Personal information
- Full name: Philip John Allen
- Date of birth: 5 November 1902
- Place of birth: Hanwell, England
- Date of death: May 1992 (aged 89)
- Place of death: Newton Abbott, England
- Position: Full back

Youth career
- Grenadier Guards

Senior career*
Years	Team	Apps	(Gls)
1922–1924	Brentford	3	(0)
- Peterborough & Fletton United
- Wellingborough Town
- Stamford
- * Club domestic league appearances and goals

Philip John Allen (5 November 1902 – May 1992) was an English professional footballer who played as a full back in the Football League for Brentford.

== Career ==
A full back, Allen joined Third Division South club Brentford in 1922. Confined mostly to the reserve team, he made just three first team appearances before departing at the end of the 1923–24 season. After his release, Allen dropped into non-League football and played for Southern League club Peterborough & Fletton United and Northamptonshire League clubs Wellingborough Town and Stamford.

== Personal life ==
Allen served in the Grenadier Guards.

== Career statistics ==
Appearances and goals by club, season and competition
Club	Season	League			FA Cup		Total	
Club	Season	Division	Apps	Goals	Apps	Goals	Apps	Goals
Brentford	1922–23	Third Division South	1	0	0	0	1	0
Brentford	1923–24	Third Division South	2	0	0	0	2	0
Career total			3	0	0	0	3	0
