= Cyril Hunter =

English footballer

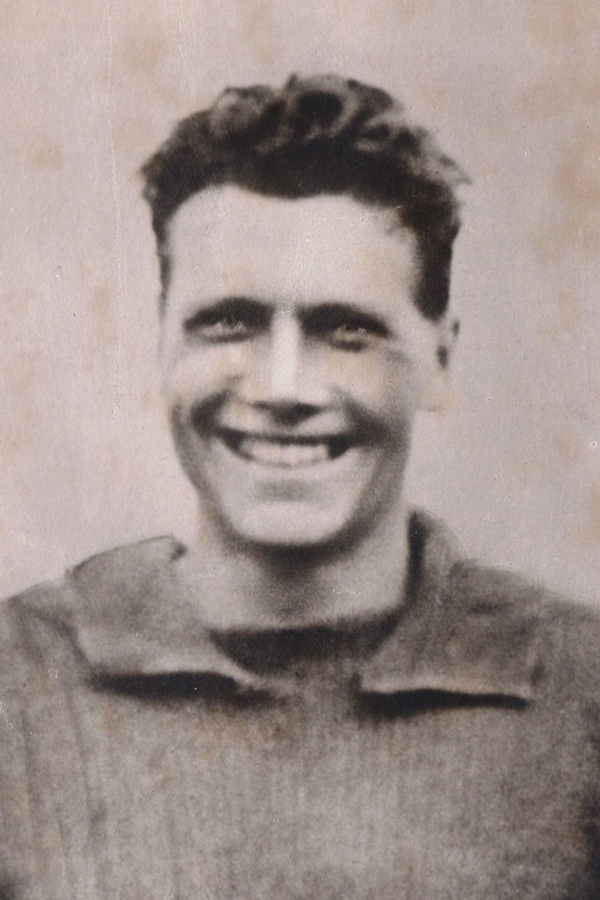
- Hunter while with Brentford in 1922.

Personal information
- Full name: Cyril Hunter
- Date of birth: 8 February 1898
- Place of birth: Pelaw, England
- Date of death: 1962 (aged 63–64)
- Position: Centre half

Senior career*
Years	Team	Apps	(Gls)
1919–1920	Woodturners		
1920–1921	Leadgate Park		
1921–1924	Brentford	78	(2)
1924–1927	South Shields	105	(3)
1928–1929	Fall River	33	(2)
1929–1930	Lincoln City	14	(1)
- Gateshead
- * Club domestic league appearances and goals

Cyril Hunter (8 February 1898 – 1962) was an English professional footballer who played in the Football League for South Shields, Brentford and Lincoln City as a centre half. While a South Shields player, he received a six-month ban (then the longest in English football history) for exceptional rough play in a Second Division match versus rivals Middlesbrough in March 1927. He was sent off in a Gateshead reserve team match in April 1931 and was suspended until the end of the 1931–32 season.

== Career statistics ==
Appearances and goals by club, season and competition
Club	Season	League			National Cup		Total	
Club	Season	Division	Apps	Goals	Apps	Goals	Apps	Goals
Brentford	1921–22	Third Division South	21	0	—		21	0
Brentford	1922–23	Third Division South	26	0	0	0	26	0
Brentford	1923–24	Third Division South	31	2	3	0	34	2
Brentford	Total		78	2	3	0	81	2
Fall River	1928–29	American Soccer League	33	2	—		33	2
Lincoln City	1929–30	Third Division North	14	1	0	0	14	1
Career total			125	5	3	0	128	5
