= Henry Parkinson (footballer, born 1899) =

English footballer

Personal information
- Full name: Henry Parkinson
- Date of birth: 1 April 1899
- Place of birth: Little Hulton, England
- Date of death: 22 January 1994 (aged 94)
- Place of death: Oldham, England
- Height: 5 ft 8 1/2 in (1.74 m)
- Position: Centre forward

Senior career*
Years	Team	Apps	(Gls)
- Walkden Primitives
- Raphael Street Wesleyans
- Breightmet United
1920–1921	Altrincham		
1921–1923	Oldham Athletic	3	(0)
- Macclesfield
- Hazel Grove
1923–1924	Brentford	7	(2)
- Lytham
- Morecambe
- Lostock Hall
- Lytham
- Ribble Motors
- * Club domestic league appearances and goals

Henry Parkinson (1 April 1899 – 22 January 1994) was an English professional footballer who played as a centre forward in the Football League for Brentford and Oldham Athletic.

== Career statistics ==
Appearances and goals by club, season and competition
Club	Season	League			FA Cup		Total	
Club	Season	Division	Apps	Goals	Apps	Goals	Apps	Goals
Oldham Athletic	1921–22	First Division	2	0	0	0	2	0
Oldham Athletic	1922–23	First Division	1	0	0	0	1	0
Oldham Athletic	Total		3	0	0	0	3	0
Brentford	1923–24	Third Division South	7	2	0	0	7	2
Career total			10	2	0	0	10	2
