= Gordon Johnstone (cricketer) =

Australian cricketer

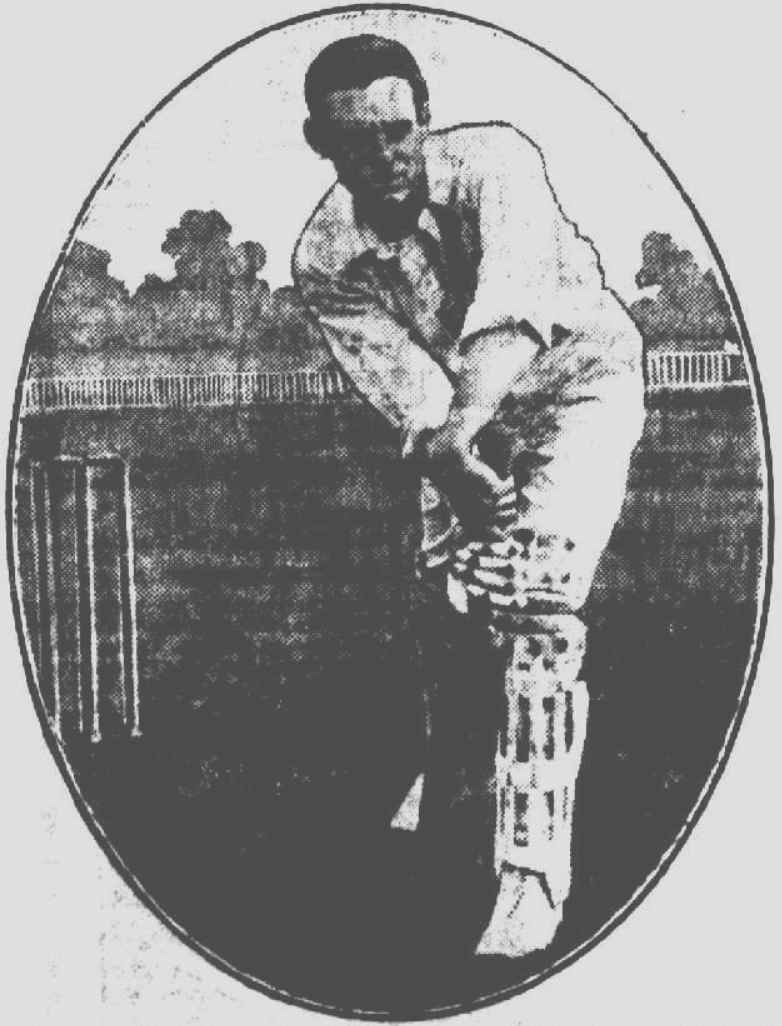

Personal information
- Born: 9 February 1885; Melbourne, Australia
- Died: 9 November 1961 (aged 76); Melbourne, Australia

Domestic team information
- Years: Team
- 1910-1913: Victoria
- Source: Cricinfo, 16 November 2015

Gordon Johnstone (9 February 1885 – 9 November 1961) was an Australian cricketer. He played three first-class cricket matches for Victoria between 1910 and 1913.

== See also ==
- List of Victoria first-class cricketers
