= Gordon Johnstone (footballer) =

English footballer (1900–1961)

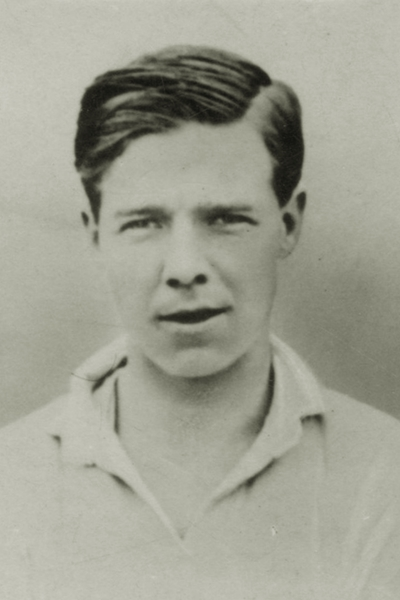
- Johnstone while with Brentford in 1923.

Personal information
- Full name: Gordon Stewart Johnstone
- Date of birth: 21 April 1900
- Place of birth: Felling, England
- Date of death: 6 October 1961 (aged 61)
- Place of death: Durham, England
- Positions: Centre forward; wing half

Senior career*
Years	Team	Apps	(Gls)
–1922	Houghton Rovers		
1922–1925	Brentford	45	(7)
- Felling Colliery
- * Club domestic league appearances and goals

Gordon Stewart Johnstone (21 April 1900 – 6 October 1961) was an English professional footballer who played as a centre forward and wing half in the Football League for Brentford.

== Career statistics ==
Appearances and goals by club, season and competition
Club	Season	League			FA Cup		Total	
Club	Season	Division	Apps	Goals	Apps	Goals	Apps	Goals
Brentford	1922–23	Third Division South	14	6	0	0	14	6
Brentford	1923–24	Third Division South	29	1	0	0	29	1
Brentford	1924–25	Third Division South	2	0	0	0	2	0
Career Total			45	7	0	0	45	7
