= Bobby Hughes (footballer) =

English footballer (1892–1955)

Personal information
- Full name: Robert Hughes
- Date of birth: 5 September 1892
- Place of birth: Bill Quay, England
- Date of death: September 1955 (aged 62–63)
- Place of death: Kingston upon Hull, England
- Height: 5 ft 8 in (1.73 m)
- Position: Outside forward

Youth career
- Primitive Sunday School
- Pelaw

Senior career*
Years	Team	Apps	(Gls)
1909–1915	Northampton Town	112	(23)
1917–1922	Hull City	66	(9)
1922–1923	Sheffield United	2	(0)
1923–1924	Brentford	16	(7)
1924–1927	Rochdale	127	(48)
1928–1930	Wigan Borough	70	(15)
- Ashton National
Total		393	(102)

International career
1915	Southern League XI	1	
- * Club domestic league appearances and goals

Robert Hughes (5 September 1892 – September 1955) was an English professional footballer who played in the Football League as an outside forward, most notably for Rochdale, Wigan Borough and Hull City. He scored more than 100 goals during his career and represented the Southern League XI versus the Football League XI in 1915.

== Personal life ==
As of 1917, Hughes was working in a government job across Northern England. After retiring from football, he returned to Hull in the 1930s and worked as a plumber in an oil refinery.

== Career statistics ==
Appearances and goals by club, season and competition
Club	Season	League			FA Cup		Other		Total	
Club	Season	Division	Apps	Goals	Apps	Goals	Apps	Goals	Apps	Goals
Hull City	1919–20	Second Division	27	3	1	0	―		28	3
Hull City	1920–21	Second Division	12	1	0	0	―		12	1
Hull City	1921–22	Second Division	27	5	2	0	―		29	5
Hull City	Total		66	9	3	0	―		69	9
Sheffield United	1922–23	First Division	2	0	0	0	―		2	0
Brentford	1923–24	Third Division South	16	7	1	0	―		17	7
Rochdale	1924–25	Third Division North	33	11	1	0	1 (Note: Appearance in Lancashire Senior Cup)	0	35	11
Rochdale	1925–26	Third Division North	36	16	3	1	0	0	39	17
Rochdale	1926–27	Third Division North	32	16	1	0	1	0	34	16
Rochdale	1927–28	Third Division North	26	5	0	0	0	0	26	5
Rochdale	Total		127	48	5	1	2	0	134	49
Wigan Borough	1928–29	Third Division North	41	6	3	1	5 (Note: 3 appearances and 1 goal in Lancashire Senior Cup, 2 appearances in Manchester Senior Cup)	1	49	8
Wigan Borough	1929–30	Third Division North	29	9	1	0	4 (Note: 3 appearances and 1 goal in Manchester Senior Cup, 1 appearance in Lancashire Senior Cup)	1	34	10
Wigan Borough	Total		70	15	4	1	9	2	83	18
Career total			281	79	13	2	11	2	305	83

== Honours ==
Wigan Borough

- Manchester Senior Cup: 1929–30
