= Peter Duncan (footballer) =

Scottish footballer (1890–1974)

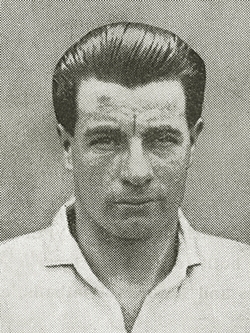
- Duncan while with Brentford in 1922.

Personal information
- Full name: Peter Stewart Duncan
- Date of birth: 1 July 1890
- Place of birth: Baillieston, Scotland
- Date of death: 8 April 1974 (aged 83)
- Place of death: East Hartford, Connecticut, United States
- Position: Inside left

Youth career
- Musselburgh

Senior career*
Years	Team	Apps	(Gls)
- Blackburn Rovers
1922–1923	Brentford	13	(2)
1923–1924	Armadale	7	(0)
- * Club domestic league appearances and goals

Peter Stewart Duncan (1 July 1890 – 8 April 1974) was a Scottish professional footballer who played as an inside left in the Football League for Brentford. He also played in the Scottish League for Armadale.

== Career statistics ==
Appearances and goals by club, season and competition
Club	Season	League			National cup (Note: Includes FA Cup, Scottish Cup)		Total	
Club	Season	Division	Apps	Goals	Apps	Goals	Apps	Goals
Brentford	1922–23	Third Division South	13	2	0	0	13	2
Armadale	1923-24	Scottish Second Division	7	0	0	0	7	0
Career total			20	2	0	0	20	2
