= Sidney Mulford =

English footballer (1896–1973)

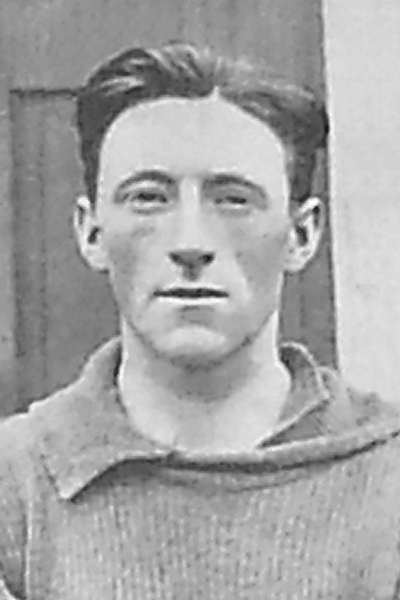
- Mulford while with Brentford in 1923.

Personal information
- Full name: Sidney Richard Mulford
- Date of birth: 23 November 1896
- Place of birth: Brentford, England
- Date of death: June 1973 (aged 76)
- Place of death: Hounslow, England
- Height: 5 ft 5 in (1.65 m)
- Position: Forward

Senior career*
| Years | Team | Apps | (Gls) |
| 1920–1922 | Kew Association | | (85) |
| 1922–1924 | Brentford | 21 | (3) |
- Northfleet United
- Dartford
- Ealing Celtic
- * Club domestic league appearances and goals

Sidney Richard Mulford (23 November 1896 – June 1973) was an English professional footballer who played as a forward in the Football League for Brentford. He began his career as an amateur and turned professional in May 1923.

== Personal life ==
Mulford served as a private in the Middlesex Regiment during the First World War and saw action in India and Mesopotamia.

== Career statistics ==
Appearances and goals by club, season and competition
| Club | Season | League | | | FA Cup | | Total | |
| Club | Season | Division | Apps | Goals | Apps | Goals | Apps | Goals |
|---|---|---|---|---|---|---|---|---|
| Brentford | 1922–23 | Third Division South | 7 | 1 | 2 | 1 | 9 | 2 |
| Brentford | 1923–24 | Third Division South | 14 | 2 | 0 | 0 | 14 | 2 |
| Career total | | | 21 | 3 | 2 | 1 | 23 | 4 |
