= Arthur Isaac (footballer) =

British footballer

Personal information
- Full name: Arthur Henry Isaac
- Date of birth: 1898
- Place of birth: Buenos Aires, Argentina
- Position: Inside forward

Senior career*
Years	Team	Apps	(Gls)
- Ealing Association
- Ipswich Town
- Cambridge Town
1923–1925	Brentford	2	(1)
- Corinthian
- Casuals
- Ealing Celtic
- * Club domestic league appearances and goals

Arthur Henry Isaac (born 1898, year of death unknown) was an Argentinian-born English amateur footballer who played as an inside forward in the Football League for Brentford. He was also a cricketer.

== Personal life ==
Isaac attended Brighton College and Royal Military College, Sandhurst.

== Career statistics ==
Appearances and goals by club, season and competition
Club	Season	League			FA Cup		Total	
Club	Season	Division	Apps	Goals	Apps	Goals	Apps	Goals
Brentford	1924–25	Third Division South	2	1	0	0	2	1
Career total			2	1	0	0	2	1
