= James Batchelor (footballer) =

English footballer

Personal information
- Full name: James William Frank Batchelor
- Date of birth: 4 July 1895
- Place of birth: Hoo St Werburgh, England
- Date of death: 1951 (aged 55–56)
- Position: Outside left

Senior career*
Years	Team	Apps	(Gls)
–1922	Chatham Town		
1922–1923	Gillingham	3	(0)
1923	Brentford	0	(0)
- * Club domestic league appearances and goals

James William Frank Batchelor (4 July 1895 – 1951) was an English professional footballer who played in the Football League for Gillingham as an outside left.

== Career ==
Born in Hoo St Werburgh, Batchelor joined Third Division South club Gillingham from non-League Chatham Town in September 1922. He made three appearances for the club before leaving to join Brentford in 1923.

== Career statistics ==
Appearances and goals by club, season and competition
Club	Season	League			FA Cup		Total	
Club	Season	Division	Apps	Goals	Apps	Goals	Apps	Goals
Gillingham	1922–23	Third Division South	3	0	0	0	3	0
Career total			3	0	0	0	3	0
