= Aberdare Athletic F.C. =

Former association football club in Wales

Aberdare Athletic
- Full name: Aberdare Athletic Football Club
- Founded: 1893
- Dissolved: 1928; 98 years ago
- Ground: Athletic Ground, Aberdare
Home colours

Aberdare Athletic Football Club were a Welsh football club founded in 1893 and based at the Athletic Ground in Aberdare. They joined the Football League in 1921 but were replaced by Torquay United after failing to be re-elected in 1927.

== History ==
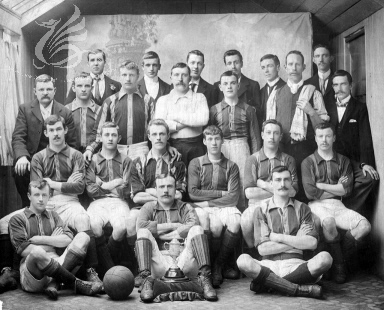
The Aberdare team of 1908–09.

=== Foundation ===
Founded in 1893, Aberdare were Welsh Cup runners-up in 1903–04, 1904–05 and 1922–23. In 1920–21, they joined the Welsh Section of the Southern League and finished runners-up in their first season. That gained them entry to the Football League Third Division South for the next season along with Charlton Athletic.

=== League football ===
Despite a promising start in league football, finishing 8th in the 1921–22 season, Aberdare suffered financial instablility throughout the 1920s. The club merged with Aberaman Athletic in 1926 with the first team competing in the Football League under the name Aberdare Athletic, while the reserve team played in the Welsh League under the name Aberdare & Aberaman Athletic. However the merged clubs still had to operate on a tight player budget meant it was unable to secure new players. In the 1926–27 season, Aberdare Athletic finished bottom of the Third Division South and failed to gain re-election to the League, with Torquay United taking their place.

Aberdare's loss of their Football League place was controversial. In the first ballot, Aberdare and Southern League side Torquay, the latter having previously applied to join the League in 1923, tied with 21 each. That round of voting was marred by controversy as the potentially tie-breaking ballot was reported to be "spoilt" and Aberdare's secretary claimed that one of the scrutineers was "an interested party". Aberdare lost the second ballot with 19 votes to Torquay's 26; fellow League side Watford, who had finished second-bottom, were comfortably re-elected with 44 votes. The club now fully adopted the name "Aberdare & Aberaman Athletic", and rejoined the Southern League.

=== Decline ===
The club only survived for another season, and in 1928, the Aberaman faction split away to re-form Aberaman Athletic, while the Aberdare half folded. Aberdare & Aberaman Athletic was again re-formed in 1945, but that side also split in 1947. Aberdare Town F.C. continue to play in the Welsh Football League today.

== Managers ==
The following were managers around the time the team was Football League side:

- William Lot, June 1920 – March 1922
- Frank Bradshaw, May 1923 – April 1924
- Sydney Beaumont, 1924–1927
- Harry Hadley, November 1927 – April 1928

== History ==
Welsh Football League

- Winners (4): 1904–05, 1908–09, 1911–12, 1920–21

== League and Cup history ==
Season	League record									FA Cup	Notes
Season	Division	P	W	D	L	F	A	Pts	Pos	FA Cup	Notes
1921–22	Div 3 South	42	17	10	15	57	51	44	8th	Extra preliminary round	
1922–23	Div 3 South	42	9	11	22	42	70	29	21st	First round	Re-elected
1923–24	Div 3 South	42	12	14	16	45	58	38	12th	First round	
1924–25	Div 3 South	42	14	9	19	54	67	37	18th	Fourth qualifying round	
1925–26	Div 3 South	42	17	8	17	74	66	42	9th	Third round	
1926–27	Div 3 South	42	9	7	26	62	101	25	22nd	First round	Failed re-election
All-time league results:		252	78	59	115	334	413	215			
