= Kelly (surname) =

- Pronunciation: /ˈkɛli/
- Language: English

Origin
- Languages: Irish, English

Other names
- See also: Kelly (given name); O'Kelly

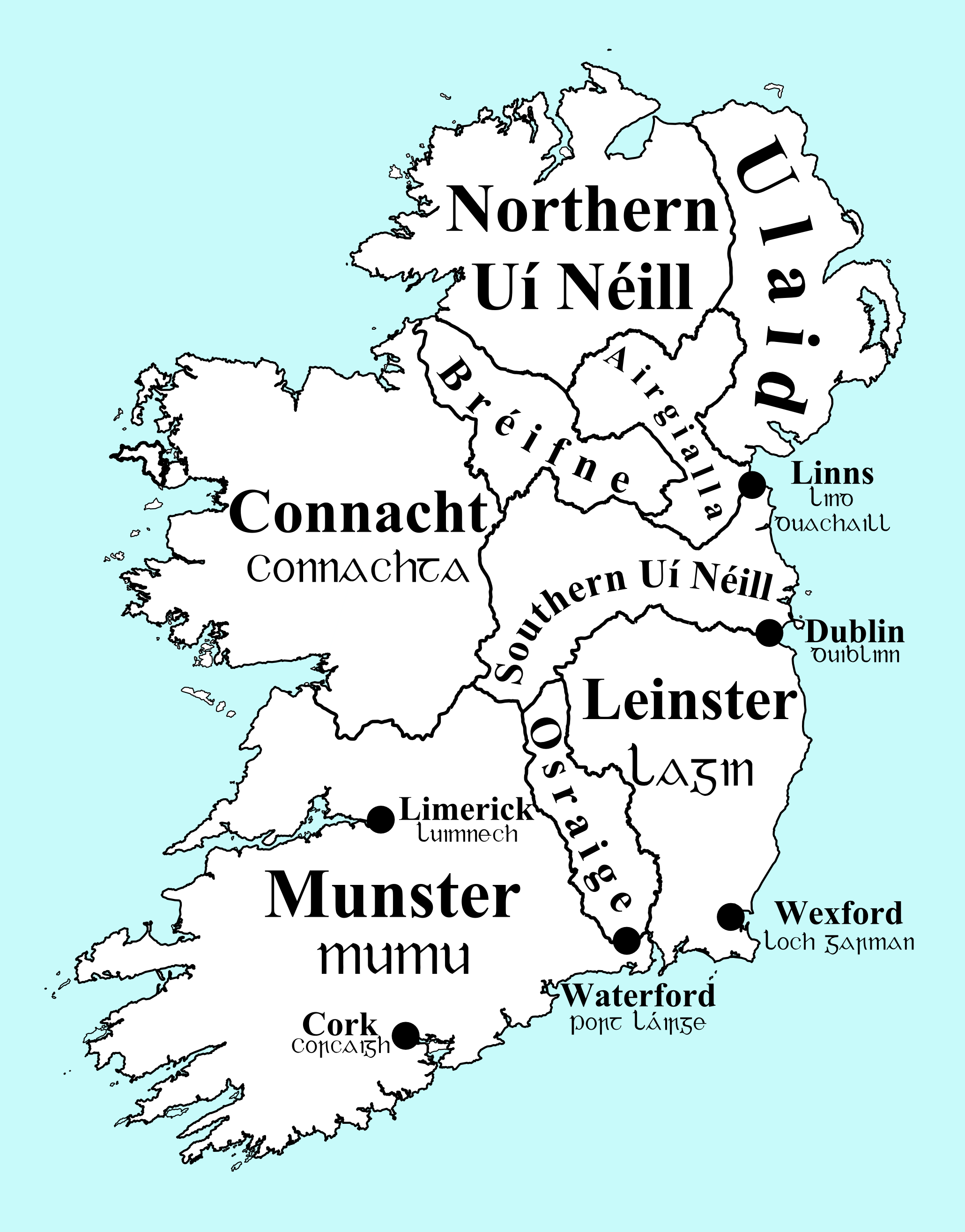
Map of medieval Gaelic Ireland showing the location of Ulaid circa 900 A.D.

Kelly or O'Kelly is a surname of Irish origin. It derives from the Kings of Uí Maine. The name is a partially anglicised version of older Irish names and has numerous origins, most notably from the Ui Maine. In some cases it is derived from toponyms located in Ireland and Great Britain; in other cases it is derived from patronyms in the Irish language.

== Etymology ==
In many cases Kelly is an anglicisation of the Irish surname Ó Ceallaigh (Irish pronunciation: [oː ˈcal̪ˠiː]), which means "descendant of Ceallach", but it can also mean warrior or fighter. The personal name Ceallach has been thought to mean "bright-headed", but the current understanding is that the name means "frequenting churches", derived from the Irish ceall. In other cases the surname Kelly is an Anglicisation of the Irish Ó Cadhla, which means "descendant of Cadhla". The O'Kelly or Kelly of the Clan Brasil Mac Coolechan originated as a chieftain clan of the Ulaid.

The surname can also be derived from several place names. For example, the surname can be derived from two places in Scotland: Kelly, near Arbroath; and Kellie, in Fife. The surname can also be derived from a place name in England: Kelly, in Devon. This place name is derived from the Cornish celli, meaning "wood" or "grove".

== Prevalence ==
The surname is one of the most common in Ireland. It is also very common in Galloway, and the Isle of Man. Many Irish immigrated to Galloway before and during the Irish famine. When including all of its variations, the name O'Kelly, Kelly, Kelley, Kellie and the Gaelic form Ó Ceallaigh, makes it the most prevalent surname in Ireland. There are approximately half a million people worldwide who bear this name. The name O'Kelly did not spring from a single source, but arose independently in several areas in Ireland, also in Scotland and the Isle of Man and in England. In other areas, notably in Isle of Man, Cornwall and probably in Antrim, the name Kelly arose from Celli, meaning man of the woods.

== People with the surname ==
=== A–I ===
- Alan Kelly (disambiguation), several people
- Alexandra Filia Kelly, English businesswoman
- Amanda Kelly (born 1982), Scottish kickboxer
- Amethyst Kelly (born 1990), Australian rapper known as Iggy Azalea
- Archie Kelly (1921–2005), Scottish footballer
- Arthur Kelly (disambiguation), several people
- Arvesta Kelly (born 1945), American basketball player
- Austin Kelly (born 1989), American basketball coach
- Autumn Kelly (born 1978), wife of Peter Phillips, grandson of Queen Elizabeth II
- Barbara Kelly (1924–2007), Canadian-born English actress
- Barbara L. Kelly (born 1966), Scottish-Irish musicologist
- Benedictus Marwood Kelly (1785–1867), British naval officer
- Bernadette Kelly (born 1964), British civil servant
- Bernard Kelly (disambiguation), several people
- Bernie Kelly (disambiguation), several people
- Brian Kelly (disambiguation), several people
- Brigid Kelly (1983–2024), American politician
- Brigit Pegeen Kelly (1951–2016), American poet
- Bryan Kelly (1934–2026), English composer
- Caden Kelly (born 2003), Irish association footballer
- Carson Kelly (born 1994), American baseball player
- Cassandra Kelly, company director from Australia
- Cassandra Kelly (athlete) (born 1963), athlete from New Zealand
- Chad Kelly (born 1994), American football player
- Charles Kelly (disambiguation), several people
- Charlie Kelly (disambiguation), multiple people
- Chip Kelly (born 1963), American football coach
- Chris Kelly (1978–2013), American hip hop artist; half of the duo Kris Kross
- Claire Kelly (1934–1998), American actress
- Clare Kelly (1922–2001), English actress
- Colin Kelly (1915–1941), World War II ace pilot
- Colin Kelly (American football) (born 1989), American football player
- Craig Kelly (actor) (born 1970), British actor
- Craig Kelly (politician) (born 1963), Australian politician
- Dan Kelly (bushranger), Australian bushranger, member of the Kelly family
- Darren Kelly (born 1978), Northern Irish footballer
- Dave Kelly (disambiguation)
- David Kelly (disambiguation)
  - David Patrick Kelly (born 1951), American actor, musician, and lyricist
- Dean Lennox Kelly (born 1975), British actor
- De-Anne Kelly (born 1954), Australian politician
- Deja Kelly (born 2001), American basketball player
- Derrick Kelly II (born 1995), American football player
- Des Kelly (born 1965), British journalist
- Diane Kelly, British microbiologist
- Don Kelly (baseball) (born 1980), American professional baseball player
- Donal Kelly (1938–2025), Irish journalist and broadcaster
- Eamon Kelly (actor) (1914–2001), Irish actor and author
- Edmond Kelly (1874–1955), WWI Chaplain and Irish Parish Priest in County Tipperary, member of the Kelly family
- Edmund Kelly (disambiguation)
- Edna F. Kelly (1906–1997), American politician
- Edward Kelly (disambiguation)
- Elizabeth Kelly (1921–2025), English actress
- Ellsworth Kelly (1923–2015), American painter and sculptor
- Elsa Kelly (born 1939), Argentine lawyer and diplomat
- Elsie Kelly (1936–2026), English actress
- Emma Kelly (1918–2001), American musician
- Emmett Kelly (1898–1979), American circus performer
- Eric P. Kelly (1884–1960), American author
- Erin Kelly (disambiguation), several people
- Ethel Knight Kelly (1875–1949), Canadian–Australian actress and writer
- Eugene Kelly (born 1965), Scottish musician
- Everett Kelly (politician) (1926–2018), American politician from Florida
- Fitzroy Kelly (1796–1880), British judge
- Florence Finch Kelly (1858–1939), American journalist and novelist
- Fran Kelly, Australian radio journalist
- Francis Kelly (Canadian politician) (1803–1879)
- Francis Kelly (Medal of Honor) (1860–1938), American sailor
- Frank Kelly (disambiguation)
- Frederick Kelly (disambiguation)
- Gabriella Cázares-Kelly (born 1982), Tohono Oʼodham and American educator, community organizer, and politician
- Gabrielle Kelly, Irish statistician
- Gene Kelly (1912–1996), American actor
- George Kelly (baseball) (1895–1984), American baseball player
- George "Machine Gun" Kelly (1895–1954), American gangster
- George Kelly (disambiguation), several peole
- Gerry Kelly (broadcaster) (born 1948), Northern Irish television presenter
- Gerry Kelly, Sinn Féin politician
- Grace Kelly (1929–1982), American film actress, Princess of Monaco
- Graham Kelly (disambiguation), several people
- Guillermo Patricio Kelly (1921–2005), Argentine politician and activist
- Guy E. Kelly, American politician
- Gwen Kelly (1922–2012), Australian novelist and short-story writer
- Harry Kelly (politician) (1895–1971), Governor of Michigan
- Helen Kelly (trade unionist) (1964–2016), New Zealand trade unionist
- Henry Kelly (disambiguation), several people, including
  - Henry Kelly (1946–2025), Irish television presenter
- Hugh Kelly (poet) (1739–1777), Irish dramatist and poet
- Hughie Kelly (1923–2009), Scottish international footballer
- Hugh Kelly (goalkeeper) (1919–1977), Northern Irish international footballer
- Hugh Craine Kelly (1848–1891), farmer and MHA in South Australia

=== J–M ===
- Jack Kelly (actor) (1927–1992), American actor
- Jackie Kelly (born 1964), Australian politician
- James Kelly (basketball) (born 1993), American basketball player in the Israel Basketball Premier League
- James Kelly (Irish Army officer) (1929–2003), Irish army officer
- James Kelly (congressman) (1760–1819), U.S. politician
- James A. Kelly (born 1936), U.S. politician
- James Butler Knill Kelly (1832–1907), Scottish-born Canadian Anglican bishop, later Primus of the Scottish Episcopal Church
- James K. Kelly (1819–1903), American senator
- James M. Kelly (astronaut) (born 1964), American astronaut
- James M. Kelly (Boston politician) (1940–2007), American politician, former president of the Boston City Council.
- James M. Kelly (Maryland politician) (born 1960), American
- James Patrick Kelly (born 1951), American science fiction author
- James Plunkett Kelly (1920–2003), Irish writer, author of Strumpet City
- Jane Louise Kelly, Judge of the United States Court of Appeals for the Eighth Circuit
- Janis Kelly (volleyball) (born 1971), Canadian volleyball player
- Janis Kelly (soprano), Scottish operatic soprano
- Jean-Baptiste Kelly (1783–1854), Canadian vicar-general
- Jean Louisa Kelly (born 1972), American actress
- Jeremiah Kelly (1900–1962), Scottish footballer
- Jermaine Kelly (born 1995), American football player
- Jewel Kelly Jr., American politician
- Jill Kelly (actress) (born 1971), American pornographic actress
- Jim "Spider" Kelly (1912–?), Northern Irish boxer of the 1920s, '30s and '40s
- Jim Kelly (born 1960), American football quarterback
- Jimmy Kelly (American football), NFL player
- Jo Ann Kelly (1944–1990), English blues singer and guitarist
- Joanne Kelly (born 1980), Canadian actress
- Joe Kelly (disambiguation), several people
- John Kelly (architect) (1840–1904)
- John William Kelly (academic) (born 1955), Vice President Clemson University and President Florida Atlantic University
- John Kelly (coal merchant) (1840–1904), John Kelly Limited shipowner and coal merchant
- John Kelly (running back) (born 1996), American football player
- John Robert Kelly (1849–1919), politician in South Australia, farmer in SA then Queensland.
- Joe Kelly (racing driver), Formula 1 driver in the 1950 & 1951 British Grand Prix
- John B. Kelly Sr., Olympic medaling rower; father of Grace Kelly and John B. Kelly Jr.
- John B. Kelly Jr., aka Jack Kelly, Olympic medaling rower, politician, president of the US Olympic Committee
- John F. Kelly (born 1950), U.S. Marine Corps general, Trump administration chief of staff
- John J. Kelly, Medal of Honor recipient
- John Larry Kelly Jr., Bell Labs scientist who formulated the Kelly criterion
- John Melville Kelly (1877–1962), American artist
- John Norman Davidson Kelly (1909–1997), theologian and principal of St Edmund Hall, Oxford University
- Johnny Kelly (born 1968), American musician
- Joseph Michael Kelly (born 1956), American architect, engineer and merchant mariner
- Joseph Kelly (disambiguation), multiple people
- Josephine Gates Kelly (1888–1976), Native American activist and politician
- Josh Kelly (disambiguation), multiple people
- Kathryn Kelly (born 1988), American track and field athlete
- Kameron Kelly (born 1996), American football player
- Kemesha Kelly (born 1989), Jamaican beauty pageant winner and activist
- Karen Kelly Irish camogie player
- Kate Kelly (disambiguation)
- Katherine Kelly (actress), English actress, best known as Becky McDonald in Coronation Street
- Kathy Kelly, pacifist
- Keith Kelly (singer) (born 1935), English pop singer, guitarist and songwriter
- Kelly Kelly, ring name of American professional wrestler Barbara Blank (born 1987)
- Kelly O'Rourke, local grocer
- Ken Kelly (disambiguation)
- Kevin Kelly (disambiguation)
- Kevin T. Kelly (born 1960), American Postmodern Pop Artist
- Kieran Kelly (disambiguation)
- King Kelly (1857–1894), American baseball player
- Klesie Kelly, American soprano
- Kyu Blu Kelly (born 2000), American football player
- Laura Kelly (born 1950), American politician
- Leonard "Red" Kelly (1927–2019), Canadian hockey player and politician
- Liam Kelly (Irish republican), (1922–2011), paramilitary leader and elected official
- Linda L. Kelly (born 1949), Attorney General of Pennsylvania
- Linda Kelly (author) (1936–2019), English historian
- Linda Kelly (cyclist) (born 1993), Irish cyclist
- Lisa Kelly (singer) (born 1977), Irish singer (Celtic Woman soloist)
- Lisa Kelly (trucker) (born 1980), American television personality
- Lisa Robin Kelly (1975–2013), American actress
- Lorraine Kelly, Scottish television presenter
- Luke Kelly (1940–1984), Irish singer and folk musician
- Luke Kelly (rugby league) (born 1989), Australian rugby league player
- Lynne Kelly (science writer) (born 1951), Australian writer
- Maeve Kelly (1930–2025), Irish writer
- Makenna Kelly (born 2005), American social media influencer
- Manus Kelly, Irish businessman and rally driver
- Marie-Noële Kelly (1901–1995), Belgian-born hostess and traveller
- Mark Kelly (disambiguation), several people
- Martin Kelly (disambiguation), several people
  - Martin Kelly (footballer), English footballer, currently playing for Crystal Palace
- Mary Kelly (artist) (born 1941), American artist and writer
- Mary Jane Kelly (c. 1863 – 1888), British prostitute and victim of Jack the Ripper
- Matthew Kelly (born 1950), British television presenter
- Matthew Kelly (musician), American rock musician
- Maya Kelly (diver) (born 2006), American high diver
- Megyn Kelly (born 1970), American newscaster
- Melissa J. Kelly (born 1962), American politician
- Merrill Kelly (born 1988), American baseball player
- Mervin Kelly (1894–1971), American physicist
- Michael Kelly (disambiguation)
  - Michael Kelly (physicist), New Zealand-British physicist
  - Michael Kelly (tenor) (1762–1826), Irish actor, singer and composer
  - Michael Kelly (bishop), fourth Roman Catholic Archbishop of Sydney
  - Michael Kelly (sport shooter) (1872–1923), American Olympic sport shooter
  - Michael Kelly (editor), American writer and editor
  - Michael Kelly (Lord Provost), former Lord Provost of the City of Glasgow and businessman
  - Michael Kelly (actor), American actor featured in Dawn of the Dead (2004)
  - Michael Kelly (baseball), American baseball player
  - Michael Eugene Kelly, automotive manufacturing entrepreneur and investment holding businessman
- Micaela Kelly (born 1998), American basketball player
- Mike Kelly (journalist), contemporary American journalist
- Mike Kelly (born 1942), English football goalkeeper and goalkeeping coach
- Mike Kelly (outfielder) (born 1970), baseball outfielder
- Mike Kelly (Australian politician), contemporary Australian politician
- Minka Kelly, American actress
- Moira Kelly, American actress
- Moiya Kelly (1934–2023), British actress

=== N–Z ===
- Nancy Kelly (1921–1995), American actress
- Natália Kelly (born 1994), Austrian singer
- Ned Kelly (1854–1880), Australian Bushranger, member of Kelly family
- Neil Kelly, British rugby league footballer and coach
- Noel Kelly (disambiguation), several people
- Nyjalik Kelly (born 2004), American football player
- Omari Kelly (born 2003), American football player
- Parker Kelly (born 1999), Canadian ice hockey player
- Pat Kelly (trade unionist) (1929–2004), New Zealand trade unionist
- Patrick Kelly (disambiguation)
- Paul Kelly (journalist), Australian
- Paul Kelly (disambiguation), multiple people
- Paula Kelly (disambiguation), several people
- Petra Kelly (1947–1992), co-founder of German Green Party
- Raymond Kelly (disambiguation), multiple people
- Regan Kelly (born 1981), Canadian ice hockey player
- Reniya Kelly (born 2005), American basketball player
- Richard Kelly (director) (born 1975), American
- Richard Kelly (Florida politician) (1924–2005), American
- Rick Kelly (born 1983), Australian racing driver
- Robert Kelly (poet) (born 1935), American poet
- Robert Kelly (politician) (1845–1920), MHA of South Australia
- Robert Kelly (singer) (born 1967), birth name of R. Kelly, American singer-songwriter, and record producer
- Rozie Kelly (born 1988/1989), English novelist
- Ruth Kelly (born 1968), British politician
- Ryan Kelly (disambiguation)
- Samantha Kelly (born 1997), American voice actress
- Samuel Kelly (coal merchant) (1818–1877), Unionist gun-runner and John Kelly Limited coal merchant
- Scott Kelly (disambiguation), several people
- Sean Kelly (cyclist) (born 1956), Irish
- Siena Kelly (born 1996), British actress
- Sir Samuel Kelly (1879 - 1937), philanthropist and John Kelly Limited coal merchant
- Stephen Kelly (footballer, born 1983), Irish association footballer
- Stuart Kelly (rugby league) (born 1976), Australian rugby league player
- Stuart Kelly (footballer) (born 1981), Scottish footballer
- Stuart Kelly (literary critic), Scottish critic and author
- Sue W. Kelly (born 1936), American politician
- T. C. Kelly (1917–1985), Irish composer
- The Kelly Family, European-American musicians
- Thomas Kelly (cricketer)
- Thomas Kelly (Medal of Honor, 1898), American Medal of Honor recipient
- Thomas C. Kelly, Archbishop of the Archdiocese of Louisville, Kentucky
- Thomas Forrest Kelly (born 1943), American musicologist
- Thomas J. Kelly (Irish nationalist)
- Thomas J. Kelly (Medal of Honor), American Medal of Honor recipient
- Thomas Raymond Kelly (Quaker mystic) (1893–1941), Quaker mystic
- Todd Kelly (born 1979), Australian racing driver
- Tom Kelly (baseball) (born 1950), manager of the American baseball team the Minnesota Twins
- Thomas J. Kelly (aerospace engineer) (1929–2002), American aerospace engineer
- Tom Kelly (Gaelic footballer), footballer
- Tom Kelly (SDLP politician), media commentator and member of the Social Democratic and Labour Party in Northern Ireland
- Tom Kelly (musician), American songwriter
- Tommy Kelly (actor) (1925–2016), American child actor
- Tori Kelly (1992-), American singer-songwriter
- Tracy Kelly, Northern Ireland politician
- Ty Kelly (born 1988), American-Israeli baseball player
- Tyson Kelly, American musician, former member of Beatles tribute bands The Bootleg Beatles and The Fab Four; son of songwriter Tom Kelly
- Van Kelly, baseball player
- Walt Kelly (1913–1973), American cartoonist
- Walter F. Kelly (1874–1961), American college sports coach
- William Kelly (inventor) (1811–1888), American
- William Kelly (Alabama politician) (1786–1834), American politician
- William Kelly (Bible scholar) (1821–1906), member of the Plymouth Brethren
- William Osmund Kelly (1909–1974), Flint, Michigan Mayor, 1940–44
- William W. J. Kelly, Lieutenant Governor of Florida, 1865–68
- Wynton Kelly (1931–1971), Jamaican-born jazz pianist
- Xavier Kelly (born 1997), American football player
- Zack Kelly (born 1995), American baseball player

=== O'Kelly ===
- Albéric O'Kelly de Galway (1911–1980), Belgian chess grandmaster
- Aloysius O'Kelly (1853–1936), Irish painter, brother of James Joseph O'Kelly
- Christopher O'Kelly (1895–1922), Canadian recipient of the Victoria Cross
- Claire O'Kelly (1916–2004), Irish archaeologist
- Don O'Kelly (1924–1966), American actor
- Gabriel O'Kelly (died 1731), Bishop of Elphin from 1718 to 1731
- James O'Kelly (politician) (1845–1916), Irish politician, brother of Aloysius O'Kelly
- John J. O'Kelly (1872–1957), Irish politician
- Joseph O'Kelly (1828–1885), Franco-Irish composer, and his brothers Auguste (1829–1900) and George (1831–1914)
- Malcolm O'Kelly (born 1974), Irish rugby player
- Seán T. O'Kelly (1882–1966), second President of Ireland
- Seumas O'Kelly (1881–1918), Irish writer
