= 1950–51 Brentford F.C. season =

English football team season

Brentford
1950–51 season
- Chairman: Frank Davis
- Secretary-Manager: Jackie Gibbons
- Stadium: Griffin Park
- Second Division: 9th
- FA Cup: Third round
- Top goalscorer: League: Dare (16); All: Dare (16)
- Highest home attendance: 26,393
- Lowest home attendance: 9,808
- Average home league attendance: 19,593
Home colours

During the 1950–51 English football season, Brentford competed in the Football League Second Division. Amidst a period of transition, the Bees repeated the previous season's 9th-place finish.

== Season summary ==
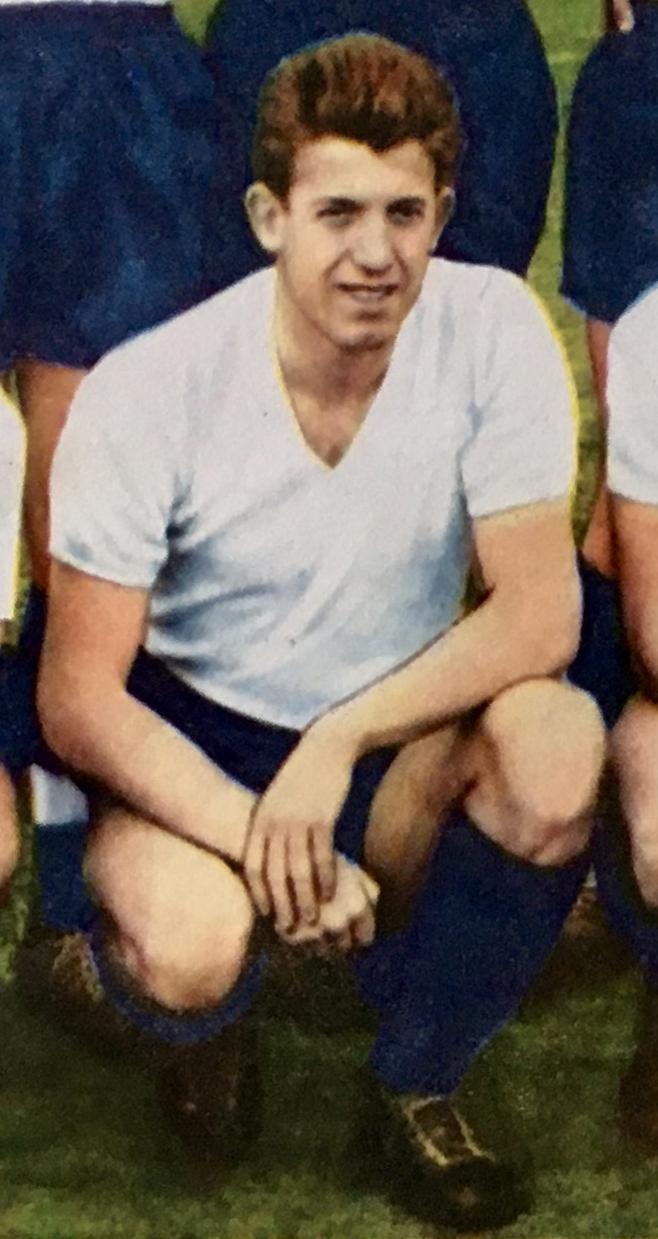
Future England international inside forward Peter Broadbent departed Griffin Park for a £10,000 fee in February 1951.

Jackie Gibbons' Brentford began the 1950–51 season with Billy Dare as the only recognised goalscorer on the club's books. The squad was augmented by young forward Bernard Kelly and former Blackpool right half Ken Horne replaced the retired Malky MacDonald. Aside from four wins in a row in August and September 1950, Brentford had a torrid first half of the season and fell to just one place above relegation by mid-November. Injuries and constant tinkering meant manager Gibbons had been unable to field a settled XI.

A 4–0 win over Southampton on Boxing Day was the turning point. A new half back line was formed, with forwards Tony Harper and Jimmy Hill moving back to play alongside captain Ron Greenwood. Fred Monk, who had been converted into a full back, was re-deployed in his original forward position. Manager Jackie Gibbons also recruited football analyst Charles Reep in February 1951. Fred Monk, Billy Sperrin and Billy Dare scored regularly from mid-January 1951 through to the end of the season and helped the team secure a second-successive 9th-place finish. Monk set a new club record when he scored in 10 consecutive matches between February and April 1951.

== League table ==
Pos	Team	Pld	W	D	L	GF	GA	GAv	Pts
7	Coventry City	42	19	7	16	75	59	1.271	45
8	Sheffield United	42	16	12	14	72	62	1.161	44
9	Brentford	42	18	8	16	75	74	1.014	44
10	Hull City	42	16	11	15	74	70	1.057	43
11	Doncaster Rovers	42	15	13	14	64	68	0.941	43

Rules for classification: 1) Points; 2) Goal average; 3) Goals scored

== Results ==
Brentford's goal tally listed first.

=== Legend ===
Win	Draw	Loss

=== Football League Second Division ===
No.	Date	Opponent	Venue	Result	Attendance	Scorer(s)
1	19 August 1950	Luton Town	A	0–2	17,721	
2	21 August 1950	Blackburn Rovers	A	2–3	30,176	Garneys, Goodwin
3	26 August 1950	Leeds United	H	1–2	20,276	Manley
4	30 August 1950	Blackburn Rovers	H	3–2	12,122	Hill (2), Manley (pen)
5	2 September 1950	West Ham United	A	2–1	21,246	Dare, Hill
6	6 September 1950	Barnsley	A	3–2	15,505	Hill, Sinclair (2)
7	9 September 1950	Swansea Town	H	2–1	23,572	Hill, Sinclair
8	13 September 1950	Barnsley	H	0–2	18,448	
9	16 September 1950	Hull City	A	0–3	31,925	
10	23 September 1950	Doncaster Rovers	H	1–1	21,544	Dare
11	30 September 1950	Preston North End	A	2–4	29,881	Dare (2)
12	7 October 1950	Coventry City	H	0–4	19,754	
13	14 October 1950	Manchester City	A	0–4	39,646	
14	21 October 1950	Birmingham City	H	2–1	19,273	Sinclair, Goodwin
15	28 October 1950	Cardiff City	A	1–1	22,885	Hill
16	4 November 1950	Notts County	H	1–3	26,393	Goodwin
17	11 November 1950	Grimsby Town	A	2–7	14,985	Goodwin, Broadbent
18	18 November 1950	Leicester City	H	0–0	16,277	
19	25 November 1950	Chesterfield	A	2–2	9,719	Sperrin (2)
20	2 December 1950	Queens Park Rangers	H	2–1	23,121	Dare, Goodwin
21	9 December 1950	Bury	A	1–2	10,825	Goodwin
22	16 December 1950	Luton Town	H	1–0	9,808	Coote
23	23 December 1950	Leeds United	A	0–1	19,839	
24	26 December 1950	Southampton	H	4–0	22,435	Dare (4)
25	30 December 1950	West Ham United	H	1–1	19,291	Paton
26	13 January 1951	Swansea Town	A	1–2	15,422	Sperrin
27	20 January 1951	Hull City	H	2–1	20,523	Sperrin, Sinclair
28	27 January 1951	Queens Park Rangers	A	1–1	26,290	Dare
29	3 February 1951	Doncaster Rovers	A	3–0	20,733	Sperrin, Monk, Greenwood
30	10 February 1951	Bury	H	4–0	14,986	Griffiths (og), Broadbent, Monk (2)
31	17 February 1951	Preston North End	H	2–4	23,434	Goodwin, Monk
32	24 February 1951	Coventry City	H	3–3	22,892	Sperrin (2), Monk (pen)
33	3 March 1951	Manchester City	H	2–0	24,288	Monk (pen), Sperrin
34	17 March 1951	Cardiff City	H	4–0	19,663	Paton, Monk, Sperrin, Hill
35	23 March 1951	Sheffield United	H	3–1	23,188	Harper, Dare, Monk
36	24 March 1951	Notts County	A	3–2	24,936	Monk, Sperrin (2)
37	24 March 1951	Sheffield United	A	1–5	20,816	Monk
38	31 March 1951	Grimsby Town	H	5–1	15,777	Kelly, Monk, Dare, Paton (2)
39	7 April 1951	Leicester City	A	2–1	20,384	Goodwin, Dare
40	14 April 1951	Chesterfield	H	4–0	17,278	Goodwin, Dare (2), Monk
41	25 April 1951	Birmingham City	A	1–1	13,643	Dare
42	5 May 1951	Southampton	A	1–2	14,441	Monk

=== FA Cup ===
Round	Date	Opponent	Venue	Result	Attendance	Scorer
3R	6 January 1951	Stockport County	A	1–2	16,346	Paton

- Sources: Statto, 11v11, 100 Years Of Brentford

== Playing squad ==
Players' ages are as of the opening day of the 1950–51 season.

Pos.	Name	Nat.	Date of birth (age)	Signed from	Signed in	Notes
Goalkeepers						
GK	Ted Gaskell	(England)	19 December 1916 (aged 33)	Buxton	1937	
GK	Alf Jefferies	(England)	9 February 1922 (aged 28)	Oxford City	1945	
GK	Reg Newton	(England)	30 June 1926 (aged 24)	Leyton Orient	1949	
Defenders						
DF	Ken Horne	(England)	25 June 1926 (aged 24)	Blackpool	1950	
DF	Fred Monk	(England)	9 October 1920 (aged 29)	Guildford City	1948	
DF	Roddy Munro	(Scotland)	27 July 1920 (aged 30)	Rangers	1946	
DF	Wally Quinton	(England)	13 December 1917 (aged 32)	Birmingham City	1949	
Midfielders						
HB	George Bristow	(England)	25 June 1933 (aged 17)	Youth	1950	
HB	Ron Greenwood (c)	(England)	11 November 1921 (aged 28)	Bradford Park Avenue	1949	
HB	Tony Harper	(England)	26 May 1925 (aged 25)	Headington United	1948	
HB	Jimmy Hill	(England)	22 July 1928 (aged 22)	Reading	1949	
HB	Frank Latimer	(England)	3 October 1923 (aged 26)	Snowdown Colliery Welfare	1945	
HB	Tom Manley	(England)	7 October 1912 (aged 37)	Manchester United	1939	
Forwards						
FW	Jimmy Anders	(England)	8 March 1928 (aged 22)	Preston North End	1948	
FW	Ken Coote	(England)	19 May 1928 (aged 22)	Wembley	1949	
FW	Billy Dare	(England)	14 February 1927 (aged 23)	Hendon	1948	
FW	Tom Garneys	(England)	25 August 1923 (aged 26)	Chingford Town	1949	
FW	Jackie Goodwin	(England)	29 September 1920 (aged 29)	Birmingham City	1949	
FW	Bernard Kelly	(England)	21 August 1928 (aged 21)	Bath City	1950	
FW	Johnny Paton	(Scotland)	2 April 1923 (aged 27)	Celtic	1949	
FW	Bill Pointon	(England)	25 November 1920 (aged 29)	Queens Park Rangers	1950	
FW	Tommy Sinclair	(England)	13 October 1921 (aged 28)	Aldershot	1950	
FW	Billy Sperrin	(England)	9 April 1922 (aged 28)	Guildford City	1949	
Players who left the club mid-season
FW	Peter Broadbent	(England)	15 May 1933 (aged 17)	Dover	1950	Transferred to Wolverhampton Wanderers

- Sources: 100 Years Of Brentford, Timeless Bees

== Coaching staff ==
Name	Role
(England) Jackie Gibbons	Secretary-Manager
(Scotland) Jimmy Bain	Assistant manager
(England) David Richards	Trainer
(England) Jack Cartmell	Assistant trainer
(England) George Poyser	Assistant trainer

== Statistics ==
=== Appearances and goals ===

Brentford's highest appearance-makers in each position during the Football League season.

Pos	Nat	Name	League		FA Cup		Total	
Pos	Nat	Name	Apps	Goals	Apps	Goals	Apps	Goals
GK	(England)	Ted Gaskell	2	0	0	0	2	0
GK	(England)	Alf Jefferies	35	0	1	0	36	0
GK	(England)	Reg Newton	5	0	0	0	5	0
DF	(England)	Ken Horne	20	0	0	0	20	0
DF	(England)	Fred Monk	37	13	1	0	38	13
DF	(Scotland)	Roddy Munro	38	0	1	0	39	0
DF	(England)	Wally Quinton	5	0	0	0	5	0
HB	(England)	George Bristow	5	0	0	0	5	0
HB	(England)	Ron Greenwood	42	1	1	0	43	1
HB	(England)	Frank Latimer	24	0	1	0	25	0
HB	(England)	Tony Harper	29	1	1	0	30	1
HB	(England)	Jimmy Hill	38	7	0	0	38	7
HB	(England)	Tom Manley	5	2	0	0	5	2
FW	(England)	Jimmy Anders	3	0	0	0	3	0
FW	(England)	Peter Broadbent	16	2	0	0	16	2
FW	(England)	Ken Coote	6	1	1	0	7	1
FW	(England)	Billy Dare	33	16	1	0	34	16
FW	(England)	Tom Garneys	11	1	0	0	11	1
FW	(England)	Jackie Goodwin	31	9	0	0	31	9
FW	(England)	Bernard Kelly	1	1	0	0	1	1
FW	(Scotland)	Johnny Paton	31	4	1	1	32	5
FW	(England)	Bill Pointon	4	0	0	0	4	0
FW	(England)	Tommy Sinclair	16	5	1	0	17	5
FW	(England)	Billy Sperrin	26	11	1	0	27	11

- Players listed in italics left the club mid-season.
- Source: 100 Years Of Brentford

=== Goalscorers ===
Pos.	Nat	Player	FL2	FAC	Total
FW	(England)	Billy Dare	16	0	16
DF	(England)	Fred Monk	13	0	13
FW	(England)	Billy Sperrin	11	0	11
FW	(England)	Jackie Goodwin	9	0	9
HB	(England)	Jimmy Hill	7	0	7
FW	(England)	Tommy Sinclair	5	0	5
FW	(Scotland)	Johnny Paton	4	1	5
FW	(England)	Peter Broadbent	2	0	2
HB	(England)	Tom Manley	2	0	2
FW	(England)	Ken Coote	1	0	1
FW	(England)	Tom Garneys	1	0	1
HB	(England)	Ron Greenwood	1	0	1
HB	(England)	Tony Harper	1	0	1
FW	(England)	Bernard Kelly	1	0	1
Opponents			1	0	1
Total			75	1	76

- Players listed in italics left the club mid-season.
- Source: 100 Years Of Brentford

=== Management ===
Name	Nat	From	To	Record All Comps					Record League				
Name	Nat	From	To	P	W	D	L	W %	P	W	D	L	W %
Jackie Gibbons	(England)	19 August 1950	5 May 1951	43	18	8	17	41.86	42	18	8	16	42.86

=== Summary ===
Games played	43 (42 Second Division, 1 FA Cup)
Games won	18 (18 Second Division, 0 FA Cup)
Games drawn	8 (8 Second Division, 0 FA Cup)
Games lost	17 (16 Second Division, 1 FA Cup)
Goals scored	76 (75 Second Division, 1 FA Cup)
Goals conceded	76 (74 Second Division, 2 FA Cup)
Clean sheets	8 (8 Second Division, 0 FA Cup)
Biggest league win	4–0 on four occasions, 5–1 versus Grimsby Town, 31 March 1951
Worst league defeat	7–2 versus Grimsby Town, 11 November 1950
Most appearances	43, Ron Greenwood (42 Second Division, 1 FA Cup)
Top scorer (league)	16, Billy Dare
Top scorer (all competitions)	16, Billy Dare

== Transfers & loans ==
Players transferred in
Date	Pos.	Name	Previous club	Fee	Ref.
May 1950	FW	(England) Peter Broadbent	(England) Dover	n/a	
May 1950	DF	(England) Ken Horne	(England) Blackpool	n/a	
May 1950	FW	(England) Terry Ledgerton	(England) Huyton	n/a	
June 1950	HB	(England) Roy Hart	n/a	n/a	
June 1950	FW	(England) Bernard Kelly	(England) Bath City	n/a	
August 1950	HB	(England) Cyril Bacon	(England) Leyton Orient	n/a	
August 1950	n/a	(Scotland) Jack Nicholson	(Scotland) Dennistoun Waverley	n/a	
August 1950	FW	(England) Tommy Sinclair	(England) Aldershot	n/a	
December 1950	FW	(England) Tommy Mycock	(Ireland) Distillery	n/a	
Players transferred out
Date	Pos.	Name	Subsequent club	Fee	Ref.
October 1950	DF	(Republic of Ireland) Bill Gorman	(England) Deal Town	Free	
February 1951	FW	(England) Peter Broadbent	(England) Wolverhampton Wanderers	£10,000	
Players released
Date	Pos.	Name	Subsequent club	Join date	Ref.
May 1951	FW	(England) Jimmy Anders	(England) Bradford City	June 1951	
May 1951	FW	(England) Tom Garneys	(England) Ipswich Town	May 1951	
May 1951	DF	(Scotland) William Gibson	(England) Tranmere Rovers	June 1951	
May 1951	FW	(England) Dickie Girling	(England) Bournemouth & Boscombe Athletic	July 1951	
May 1951	FW	(England) Bill Pointon	Retired		
May 1951	FW	(England) Tommy Sinclair	(England) Aldershot	August 1951	
