= Edmund Kelly =

Edmund Kelly (also Ned Kelly, Ed Kelly, or Edmond Kelly) may refer to:

== Clergy ==
- Edmund Kelly (bishop) (1658–1732), Irish Roman Catholic bishop of Clonfert
- Edmond Kelly (1874–1955), Irish Catholic priest, missionary in South Africa, and British Army chaplain

== Politics ==
- Edmund Kelly (Jamaican politician), Jamaican politician, speaker of the House of Assembly of Jamaica in 1719
- Ed Kelly (Illinois politician, born 1924) (1924–2016), American politician and member of the Illinois House of Representatives
- Edmund Kelly (Baptist minister), African-American Baptist minister in Tennessee

== Other people ==
- Ed Kelly (soccer) (born 1948), Irish-American soccer player and coach
- Ned Kelly (1854–1880), Australian bushranger and outlaw, folk hero of Australia

== See also ==
- Edward Kelly (disambiguation)
- Ed Kelly (disambiguation)
- Ned Kelly (disambiguation)
- Kelly (surname)
