= Chuck Kelley =

Chuck Kelley may refer to:

- Chuck Kelley (actor), "Sarge" in the film Skid Marks
- Chuck Kelley, consultant, computer architect and co-author of the book Rdb/VMS: Developing the Data Warehouse with Bill Inmon
- Chuck Kelley, music consultant on Pulp Fiction and From Dusk Till Dawn
- Chuck Kelley, poker player, appeared in World Poker Tour: Season 5
- Charles S. Kelley (born 1952), American pastor, evangelist, author

== See also ==
- Charles Kelley (disambiguation)
- Charles Kelly (disambiguation)
