= Bernard Kelly =

Bernard Kelly may refer to:

- Bernard Kelly (Irish politician) (1808–1887), Irish nationalist politician
- Bernard Kelly (American politician) (c.1823–?), American politician from New York
- Bernard Philip Kelly (1907–1958), English Catholic philosopher
- Bernard Matthew Kelly (1918–2006), Roman Catholic bishop
- Bernard Kelly (footballer) (born 1928), English footballer
- Bernard Kelly (banker) (1930–2022), British banker

== See also ==
- Bernie Kelly (disambiguation)
