= Melissa Kelly =

Melissa Kelly may refer to:

- Melissa J. Kelly, member of the Maryland House of Delegates
- Melissa Kelly (chef), American chef
