= J. J. O'Kelly =

J. J. O'Kelly may refer to:

- James O'Kelly (politician) (1845–1916) Irish nationalist MP and journalist
- John J. O'Kelly (1872–1957), "Sceilg", Irish language writer and republican

== See also ==
- O'Kelly (surname)
