= Alfred Whitehead =

Alfred Whitehead may refer to:

- Alfred Whitehead (composer) (1887–1974), English composer and organist
- Alfred North Whitehead (1861–1947), English mathematician and philosopher
- Alfred Whitehead (co-operator) (1862–1945), British co-operative activist
- Alfred K. Whitehead (1929–2021), American labor union leader
