= Patrick Kelly =

Patrick or Paddy Kelly may refer to:

== Politicians ==
- Patrick Kelly (Irish politician) (1875–1934), Irish soldier, farmer and politician, Teachta Dála (TD) for Clare 1927–1932
- Patrick Kelly (Canadian politician) (1846–1916), Prince Edward Island, Canada politician
- Patrick H. Kelly (1890–1965), American politician in Wisconsin

== Musicians ==
- Michael Patrick Kelly (born 1977), known as Paddy, member of the Kelly Family of musicians
- Patrick Kelly (fiddler) (1903–1975), Irish musician

== Religious figures ==
- Patrick Kelly (archbishop of Liverpool) (born 1938), British Roman Catholic prelate, previously bishop of Salford
- Patrick Kelly (bishop of Benin City) (1894–1991), Irish Roman Catholic prelate
- Patrick Kelly (bishop of Waterford and Lismore) (1779–1829), Irish Roman Catholic prelate, previously bishop of Richmond, United States
- Patrick E. Kelly, 14th Supreme Knight of the Knights of Columbus

== Sportspeople ==
=== Gaelic games ===
- Paddy Kelly (Cork footballer) (born 1985), Irish sportsman
- Patrick Kelly (Galway Gaelic footballer), Irish sportsman
- Paddy Kelly (Kerry footballer), Irish sportsman
- Paddy Kelly (hurler) (born 1955), Irish sportman
- Patrick Kelly (Clare hurler) (born 1986), Irish sportsman
- Paddy Kelly (Derry hurler), 2013 Champion 15 Awards winner
- Patrick Kelly (Kerry hurler), 2015 Champion 15 Awards winner
- Paddy Kelly (Laois hurler), played in the 1949 All-Ireland SHC final

=== Others ===
- Paddy Kelly (Australian footballer) (1896–1970), Australian rules footballer
- Patrick Kelly (cricketer) (1929–2002), English cricketer
- Patrick Kelly (association footballer) (1918–1985), Barnsley and Northern Irish international footballer
- Paddy Kelly (footballer, born 1978), Scottish association footballer
- Patrick J. Kelly (ice hockey) (born 1935), Canadian ice hockey player
- Patrick Kelly (racing driver) (born 1967), American racing driver
- Paddy Kelly (rugby union) (born 1995), Scottish rugby union player
- Patrick Kelly (footballer, born 2004), Northern Irish footballer

== Others ==
- Patrick Kelly (metrologist) (1756–1842), British, best known for his Oriental Metrology
- Patrick Kelly (Civil War) (c. 1822–1864), Union Officer, U.S. Civil War
- Patrick Kelly (fashion designer) (1954–1990), fashion designer
- Patrick J. Kelly (surgeon) (fl. 2000s), American neurosurgeon
- Patrick Kelly (Irish soldier) (1948–1983), Irish soldier killed by the Provisional IRA
- Patrick Joseph Kelly (1957–1987), East Tyrone Provisional IRA leader
- Patrick F. Kelly (1929–2007), U.S. federal judge
- Patrick Kelly (RCMP officer), former Royal Canadian Mounted Police undercover agent and convicted murderer
- Patrick E. Kelly, Supreme Knight of the Knights of Columbus
- Patrick Leo Kelly (1914–2007), writer and activist

== See also ==
- Pat Kelly (disambiguation)
- Patrick H. Kelley (1867–1925), politician
- Patrick E. Kelley, competition shooter
