= Charles Kelley (disambiguation) =

Charles Kelley (born 1981) is an American country music singer.

Charles Kelley may also refer to:

- J. Charles Kelley (1913–1997), American archaeologist
- Charles S. Kelley (born 1952), American pastor, evangelist, author
- Charles Edwin Kelley (1941–1962), American spree killer, see Charles Brown and Charles Kelley

== See also ==
- Charles Kelly (disambiguation)
- Chuck Kelley (disambiguation)
