= John Gannon =

John Gannon may refer to:

- John Gannon (Australian politician) (1830–1887), member of the New South Wales Legislative Assembly
- John Gannon (footballer) (born 1966), English footballer
- John D. Gannon (1948–1999), American computer scientist
- John A. Gannon (1923–1997), American labor union leader
- Sam Gannon (born 1947), real name John Gannon, Australian cricketer
- John Mark Gannon (1877–1968), American clergyman of the Roman Catholic Church
- John Gannon (Idaho politician), Idaho state representative
- John Gannon (Vermont politician), Vermont state Representative
