= Emil B. Pielke =

American politician

Member of the Maryland House of Delegates from District 9B
- In office January 14, 2002 – January 8, 2003
- Preceded by: Melissa J. Kelly
- Succeeded by: Susan W. Krebs

Personal details
- Born: March 4, 1942 (age 84) Baltimore, Maryland
- Died: June 6, 2008 Towson, Maryland
- Party: Republican
- Profession: lawyer, politician
- Website: Official website

Emil B. Pielke (March 4, 1942 – June 6, 2008) was appointed in 2002 to represent District 9B, which covers a portion of Baltimore County, Maryland.

== Background ==
Pielke was appointed on January 14, 2002, during what was a tumultuous time for this district and its representation in the Maryland House of Delegates. The position was held by James M. Kelly until he resigned to work for the White House under President George W. Bush. He was replaced by his wife Melissa J. Kelly, who resigned on January 11, 2002, after only several months in office. Pielke was the third delegate for the district in 4 months.

== Education ==
Pielke attended Parkville High School in Parkville, Maryland, the northeast suburb of Baltimore. After high school, he attended Capital University, graduating in 1964 with his B.A. in history. After serving in the military, Pielke returned to college, this time to get his J.D. from the University of Maryland School of Law, graduating in 1971.

== Career ==
Pielke served in the U.S. Air Force from 1964 to 1968. After receiving his law degree, Pielke was admitted to the Maryland Bar in 1972 and began his practice of real estate, tax and small business law. Pielke continued to serve in the Maryland Air National Guard as a judge advocate, retiring from the Air Force Reserve as a lieutenant colonel after 26 years of service.

Though only serving in the Maryland House of Delegates for a year, he did serve on the Economic Matters Committee and several subcommittees. He was even selected as a delegate to the 2004 Republican National Convention. He also served from 2003 until 2006 on the Baltimore County Republican Central Committee.

District 9B was redrawn to be included in Carroll County, Maryland, which was won by Susan W. Krebs. Pielke's district became District 42, where he lost in the 2002 Republican primary election to Susan L. M. Aumann, William J. Frank, and John G. Trueschler. All three Republican primary winners went on to win the general election.

== Election results ==
- 2002 Primary Race for Maryland House of Delegates – District 42

Voters to choose three:

Name	Votes	Percent	Outcome
Susan Aumann, Rep.	4,329	20.6%	Won
William J. Frank, Rep.	3,319	15.8%	Won
John G. Trueschler, Rep.	3,119	14.9%	Won
John J. Bishop, Rep.	2,581	12.3%	Lost
Emil B. Pielke, Rep.	2,084	9.9%	Lost
C. Rob Lee, Rep.	1,451	6.9%	Lost
Tony Campbell, Rep.	1,232	5.9%	Lost
Walter R. Hayes Jr., Rep.	1,051	5.0%	Lost
John C. Fiastro, Rep.	943	4.5%	Lost
Laura A. Downes, Rep.	859	4.1%	Lost

== Personal ==
Pielke married Gini Chapman in 1977 and the couple had one daughter.

Pielke died from pancreatic cancer in 2008 and was interred at Parkwood Cemetery in Baltimore.
