= Edward Kelley (disambiguation) =

Edward Kelley (1555–1597/8) was an English Renaissance occultist.

Edward Kelley may also refer to:

- Edward J. Kelley (1883–1960), American politician; mayor of Norwalk, Connecticut, 1945–1947
- Edward W. Kelley, American economist and member of the Federal Reserve Board of Governors
- Edward Kelley (American football) (1933–2014), American football player
- Edward Kelley (Capitol rioter), American convicted participant in the January 6 United States Capitol attack
- Jonah Edward Kelley (1923–1945), known as Eddie, American soldier of World War II
- Eddie Kelley (racing driver), American stock car racing driver

== See also ==
- Edward Kelly (disambiguation)
- Ned Kelly (1854–1880), Australian bushranger and outlaw
