= Mark Kelly (disambiguation) =

Mark Kelly (born 1964) is an American astronaut, naval officer, and U.S. senator from Arizona.

Mark Kelly or Mark Kelley may also refer to:

- Mark Kelley, Canadian journalist
- Mark Kelley (bassist), American bass player for The Roots
- Mark Kelly (Australian general) (born 1956), Australian soldier
- Mark Kelly (footballer, born 1966), English association football player
- Mark Kelly (footballer, born 1969), English-born Irish association football player
- Mark Kelly (hurler) (born 1988), Irish hurler
- Mark Kelly (keyboardist) (born 1961), Irish-British musician of the band Marillion
- Mark D. Kelly (born c. 1962), American air force officer
- Mark Kelly, American bass guitarist of Petra (band)

== See also ==
- Kelly (surname)
- Kelly Mark, Canadian artist
