= Aaron Kelly =

Aaron Kelly may refer to:

- Aaron Kelly (singer) (born 1993), American singer from Sonestown, Pennsylvania
- Aaron Kelly (Canadian football) (born 1986), Canadian football wide receiver
- Aaron Kelly (hurler), 2014 Champion 15 Awards winner

== See also ==
- Erin Kelly (disambiguation)
