= Maryland House of Delegates District 9B =

American legislative district

Maryland's legislative district 9B
- Represents part of Howard County
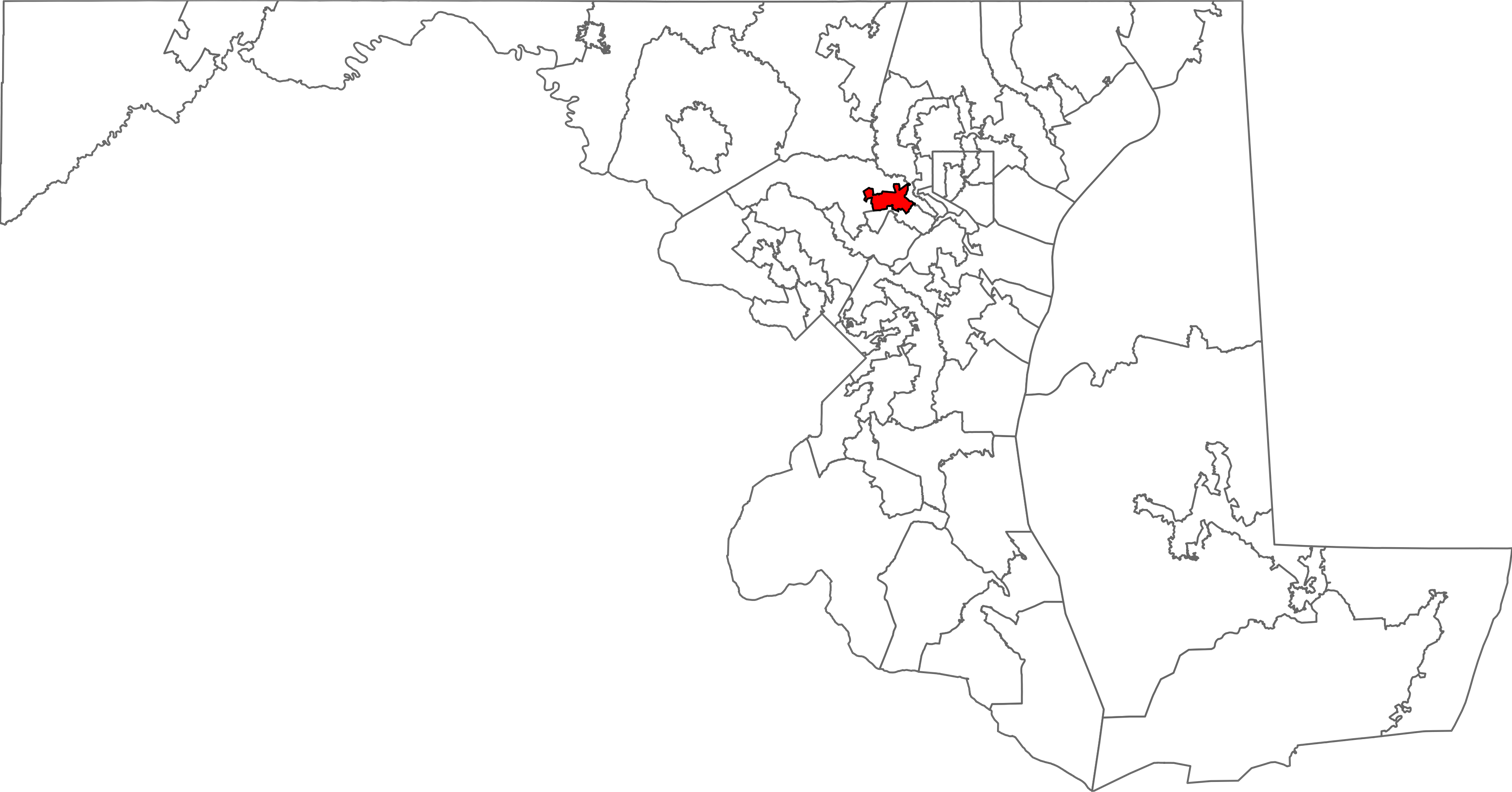
- Delegate(s): Courtney Watson (D)
- Registration: 50.2% Democratic; 24.3% Republican; 24.1% unaffiliated
- Demographics: 49.4% White; 10.2% Black/African American; 0.3% Native American; 31.7% Asian; 0.0% Hawaiian/Pacific Islander; 1.9% Other race; 6.5% Two or more races; 4.8% Hispanic
- Population (2020): 46,786
- Voting-age population: 35,064
- Registered voters: 31,234

Maryland House of Delegates District 9B is one of the 71 districts that compose the Maryland House of Delegates. Along with subdistrict 9A, it makes up the 9th district of the Maryland Senate. District 9B includes part of Howard County, and is represented by one delegate.

== Demographic characteristics ==
As of the 2020 United States census, the district had a population of 46,786, of whom 35,064 (74.9%) were of voting age. The racial makeup of the district was 23,113 (49.4%) White, 4,768 (10.2%) African American, 118 (0.3%) Native American, 14,835 (31.7%) Asian, 19 (0.0%) Pacific Islander, 912 (1.9%) from some other race, and 3,034 (6.5%) from two or more races. Hispanic or Latino of any race were 2,246 (4.8%) of the population.

The district had 31,234 registered voters as of October 17, 2020, of whom 7,542 (24.1%) were registered as unaffiliated, 7,575 (24.3%) were registered as Republicans, 15,665 (50.2%) were registered as Democrats, and 287 (0.9%) were registered to other parties.

== Past Election Results ==
=== 1998 ===
Name	Party	Votes	Percent	Outcome
James M. Kelly	Republican	9,514	100.0%	Won

=== 2002 ===
Name	Party	Votes	Percent	Outcome
Susan W. Krebs	Republican	10,093	62.0%	Won
Kenneth Holniker	Democratic	6,152	37.8%	Lost
Other Write-Ins		27	0.2%	

=== 2006 ===
Name	Party	Votes	Percent	Outcome
Susan Krebs	Republican	12,059	72.1%	Won
Anita Lombardi Riley	Democratic	4,621	27.6%	Lost
Other Write-Ins		38	0.2%	

=== 2010 ===
Name	Party	Votes	Percent	Outcome
Susan Krebs	Republican	12,488	73.5%	Won
Anita Lombardi Riley	Democratic	4,442	26.2%	Lost
Other Write-Ins		53	0.3%	

=== 2014 ===
Name	Party	Votes	Percent	Outcome
Robert Flanagan	Republican	8,202	54.9%	Won
Tom Coale	Democratic	6,736	45.1%	Lost
Other Write-Ins		12	0.1%	

=== 2018 ===
Name	Party	Votes	Percent	Outcome
Courtney Watson	Democratic	11,742	57.4%	Won
Robert Flanagan	Republican	8,680	42.4%	Lost
Other Write-Ins		26	0.1%	
