= David Kelly =

David Kelly may refer to:

== Entertainers ==
- David Kelly (actor) (1929–2012), Irish actor
- Matthew Kelly (born 1950 as David Kelly), English actor and television personality
- David Patrick Kelly (born 1951), American actor and musician

== Sportsmen ==
- David Kelly (Bahamian sailor) (1932–2009), Bahamian Olympic sailor
- David Kelly (Australian footballer) (born 1953), Australian footballer for Melbourne
- David Kelly (United States Virgin Islands sailor) (born 1955), United States Virgin Islands Olympic sailor
- David Kelly (association footballer) (born 1965), Irish association football player
- David Kelly (baseball announcer) (born 1967), American minor league baseball announcer
- David Kelly (Australian cricketer) (born 1959), Australian cricketer
- David Kelly (New Zealand cricketer) (born 1979), New Zealand cricketer
- David Kelly (Gaelic footballer) (born 1987), Gaelic footballer from Tubbercurry, County Sligo

== Others ==
- David Kelly (diplomat) (1891–1959), British diplomat
- David Kelly (mathematics educator) (1940–2025), American teacher
- David Kelly (weapons expert) (1944–2003), British UN weapons inspector
- David M. Kelly (1841–?), speaker of the Wisconsin State Assembly and member of the Wisconsin State Senate
- David Kelly (comic artist) (born 1965), American cartoonist and comics creator
- David Kelly (politician) (born 1956), West Virginia state delegate

== See also ==
- David Kelley (disambiguation)
- Dave Kelly (disambiguation)
