= Ken Kelley =

Ken Kelley may refer to:

- Ken Kelley (journalist) (1949–2008), American journalist and publisher
- Ken Kelley (American football) (born 1960), American linebacker

== See also ==
- Ken Kelly (disambiguation)
