= Harold Kelly =

Harold Kelly may refer to:

- Pat Kelly (outfielder), Harold Patrick Kelly (1944 – 2005), American baseball player
- Harold Kelly, of Och-Ziff Capital Management

== See also ==
- Harry Kelly (disambiguation)
- Harold Kelley (disambiguation)
