= Tom Garneys =

English footballer (1923–2007)

Personal information
- Full name: Thomas Thurston Garneys
- Date of birth: 25 August 1923
- Place of birth: Leytonstone, England
- Date of death: 13 March 2007 (aged 83)
- Place of death: Basildon, England
- Position: Centre forward

Senior career*
Years	Team	Apps	(Gls)
- Walthamstow Avenue
–1948	Leytonstone		
1948–1949	Notts County	0	(0)
1949	Chingford Town		
1949–1951	Brentford	12	(2)
1951–1958	Ipswich Town	247	(123)
- * Club domestic league appearances and goals

Thomas Thurston Garneys (25 August 1923 – 13 March 2007) was an English professional footballer who made over 240 appearances as a centre forward in the Football League for Ipswich Town. He scored 143 goals in a seven-year spell, which was cut short by a persistent back injury.

== Personal life ==
After his retirement from football, Garneys ran The Milestone pub (now known as The Mulberry Tree) in Ipswich. At the time of his death, he was living at a nursing home in Basildon.

== Career statistics ==
Appearances and goals by club, season and competition
Club	Season	League			FA Cup		Other		Total	
Club	Season	Division	Apps	Goals	Apps	Goals	Apps	Goals	Apps	Goals
Brentford	1949–50	Second Division	1	1	0	0	—		1	1
Brentford	1950–51	Second Division	11	1	0	0	—		11	1
Brentford	Total		12	2	0	0	—		12	2
Ipswich Town	1951–52	Third Division South	45	15	6	5	1 (Note: Appearance in Ipswich Hospital Cup)	0	52	20
Ipswich Town	1952–53	Third Division South	34	18	6	6	—		40	24
Ipswich Town	1953–54	Third Division South	44	19	7	5	—		51	24
Ipswich Town	1954–55	Second Division	23	20	1	1	—		24	21
Ipswich Town	1955–56	Third Division South	36	19	0	0	—		36	19
Ipswich Town	1956–57	Third Division South	28	12	3	3	—		31	15
Ipswich Town	1957–58	Second Division	33	19	0	0	—		33	19
Ipswich Town	1958–59	Second Division	4	1	0	0	—		4	1
Ipswich Town	Total		247	123	25	20	1	0	273	148
Career total			259	125	25	20	1	0	285	150

== Honours ==
Ipswich Town

- Football League Third Division South: 1953–54, 1956–57
