= Harry Kelley =

Harry or Henry Kelley may refer to:

- Harry Kelley (rower) (1832–1914), British oarsman on the Thames
- Harry Kelley (baseball) (1906–1958), Major League Baseball pitcher
- Henry J. Kelley (1926–1988), professor of aeronautical engineering

== See also ==
- Harry Kelly (disambiguation)
- Harold Kelley (disambiguation)
