= Henry Kelly (disambiguation) =

Henry Kelly (1946–2025) was an Irish TV presenter.

Henry Kelly may also refer to:

- Henry Kelly (cricketer) (1898–1983), South African cricketer
- Henry Kelly (VC) (1887–1960), English recipient of the Victoria Cross
- Henry A. Kelly (born 1934), professor of English at the University of California, Los Angeles

== See also ==
- Harry Kelly (disambiguation)
