= The Kelly Gang =

The Kelly Gang may refer to:

- Ned Kelly, Australian bushranger, outlaw, gang leader and convicted police-murderer
- The Kelly Gang (film), a 1920 Australian film about Ned Kelly
- The Kelly Gang (Denham play), an 1899 Australian play about Ned Kelly, attributed to Arnold Denham but likely others as well
- The Story of the Kelly Gang, 1906 Australian film about Ned Kelly, considered widely to be the worlds first feature film

== See also ==
- Ned Kelly (disambiguation)
