= Tommy Sinclair (footballer, born 1921) =

English footballer

Personal information
- Full name: Thomas Sinclair
- Date of birth: 13 October 1921
- Place of birth: Ince-in-Makerfield, England
- Date of death: October 2015 (aged 93–94)
- Place of death: Doncaster, England
- Position: Outside forward

Senior career*
Years	Team	Apps	(Gls)
1943–1944	Gainsborough Trinity		
1944–1950	Aldershot	70	(0)
1950–1951	Brentford	16	(5)
1951–1952	Bradford City	9	(0)
- * Club domestic league appearances and goals

Thomas Sinclair (13 October 1921 – October 2015) was an English professional footballer who played in the Football League for Aldershot, Bradford City and Brentford as an outside forward.

== Career statistics ==
Appearances and goals by club, season and competition
Club	Season	League			FA Cup		Total	
Club	Season	Division	Apps	Goals	Apps	Goals	Apps	Goals
Brentford	1950–51	Second Division	16	5	1	0	17	5
Career total			26	10	1	0	27	10
