= Pat Kelly =

Pat Kelly may refer to:

- Pat Kelly (American football) (1965–2003), former NFL tight end
- Pat Kelly (Australian footballer) (1923–1999), Australian rules footballer
- Pat Kelly (catcher) (born 1955), former Major League Baseball catcher
- Pat Kelly (climber) (1873–1922), early female climber and founder of the Pinnacle Club
- Pat Kelly (Gaelic footballer) (born 1981), Mayo and St Vincents footballer
- Pat Kelly (infielder) (born 1967), former Major League Baseball infielder
- Pat Kelly (musician) (1944–2019), reggae singer
- Pat Kelly (outfielder) (1944–2005), American right fielder in Major League Baseball
- Pat Kelly (politician) (born c. 1971), Canadian politician
- Pat Kelly (speed skater) (born 1962), Canadian ice speed skater
- Pat Kelly (trade unionist) (1929–2004), New Zealand trade unionist
- Patrick J. Kelly (ice hockey) (born 1935), Canadian ice hockey player

== See also ==
- Patrick Kelly (disambiguation)
