= Harry Kelly =

Harry Kelly may refer to:

- Harry Kelly (anarchist) (1871–1953), American anarchist
- Harry Kelly (basketball) (born 1961), American basketball player
- Harry Kelly (politician) (1895–1971), governor of Michigan, 1943–1947
- Harry C. Kelly (1908–1976), American physicist

== See also ==
- Harry Kelley (disambiguation)
- Henry Kelly (disambiguation)
- Harold Kelly (disambiguation)
