= Harold Kelley (disambiguation) =

Harold Kelley was a social psychologist.

Harold Kelley may also refer to:

- Harold Kelley (rugby league)
- Harold Killian Kelley, awarded Knox Trophy

== See also ==
- Harold Kelly (disambiguation)
- Harry Kelley (disambiguation)
