= Edward Kelly =

Edward Kelly may refer to:

== Sports ==
- Ed Kelly (baseball) (1888–1928), American baseball player
- Edward I. Kelly Sr. (1921–2004), American racehorse trainer
- Ed Kelly (soccer) (born 1948), Irish and American soccer player
- Eddie Kelly (boxer) (1885–1944), featherweight boxing contender from Buffalo, New York
- Eddie Kelly (footballer) (born 1951), Scottish footballer
- Edward Kelly (cricketer) (1932–1998), English cricketer

== Politics ==
- Ed Kelly (Illinois politician, born 1924), American politician, General Superintendent of the Chicago Park District
- Edward Joseph Kelly (1876–1950), American politician and mayor of Chicago
- Edward Kelly (Irish nationalist politician) (1883–1944), Irish Parliamentary Party MP from Donegal
- Edward Kelly (Monaghan politician) (1883–1972), Irish Fianna Fáil politician from Monaghan
- Edward A. Kelly (1892–1969), U.S. Representative from Illinois

== Religion ==
- Edward D. Kelly (1860–1926), American bishop
- Edward Wendall Kelly (1880–1964), American bishop of the Methodist Church
- Edward Kelly (American bishop) (1890–1956), American Roman Catholic clergyman
- Edward Kelly (Australian bishop) (1917–1944), Australian bishop of the Catholic Church.

== Other ==
- Edward Kelly (labor leader), American firefighter and trade union leader
- Edward J. Kelly (died 1877), alleged member of the 19th-century Irish-American Molly Maguires
- Ned Kelly (1854–1880), Australian bushranger and folk hero
- Edward Kelly (painter) (born 1946), British painter
- Edward J. Kelly (1897–1958), former superintendent of National Capital Parks, Washington, DC, after whom a park is named
- Edward Francis Kelly, American parapsychologist and neuroscientist

== See also ==
- Edward Kelley (disambiguation)
