= Courtney Watson (politician) =

American politician (born 1962)

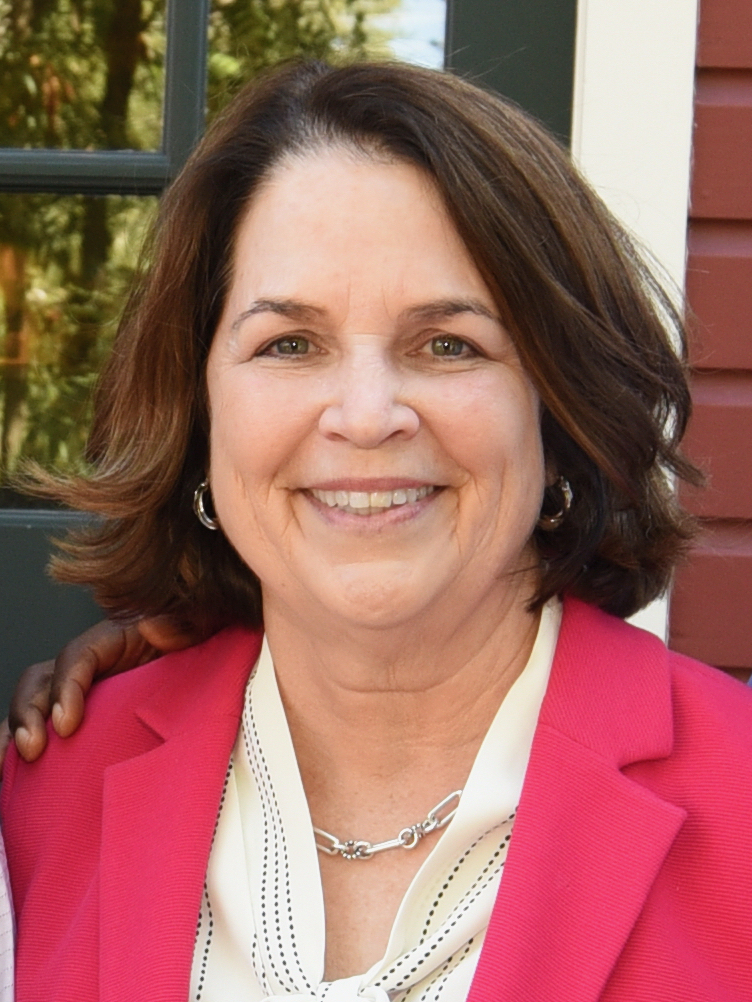

Member of the Maryland House of Delegates from the 9B district
- Incumbent
- Assumed office January 9, 2019
- Preceded by: Robert Flanagan

Personal details
- Born: September 8, 1962 (age 63) Baltimore, Maryland, U.S.
- Party: Democratic
- Spouse: Richard
- Children: 3
- Relatives: Edward L. Cochran (father)
- Education: Howard Community College; Loyola University Maryland (BA, MBA)
- Website: Official website

Mary Courtney Watson (born September 8, 1962) is a Democratic member of the Maryland House of Delegates. She was previously a member of the Howard County Council from 2006 to 2014, and she was a member of the Howard County Board of Education from 2002 to 2006.

== Early life and career ==
Watson was born in Baltimore, Maryland. She graduated from Atholton High School in Columbia, Maryland and attended Howard Community College and Loyola College, where she earned a B.A. degree in business in 1984 and a M.B.A. degree in 1986. After graduating, she started her own business, which she operated until 1991. Afterwards, she became the vice-president of sales at Rossmann-Hurt-Hoffman, a local insurance company. After finding out about crowding at Ilchester Elementary School, Watson joined a local parents committee in 1997 to lobby for strengthening county laws that limit development around crowded schools. She later co-founded County-Wide Citizens for the 12th High School, which lobbied for the opening of a new elementary school near Waterloo and a 12th high school in northwest Howard. The elementary school, Bellows Spring Elementary School, opened in 2003 and the high school, Marriotts Ridge High School, opened in 2005. She was eventually appointed to Howard County's Adequate Public Facilities Ordinance Committee by county executive James N. Robey.

In April 2002, Watson filed to run for the Howard County Board of Education, seeking to succeed board chairwoman Jane B. Schuchardt. She won the nonpartisan primary election in September, receiving 62 percent of the vote. At the time of her election, Watson was the youngest person on the Board of Education and was the only member with a child in the county school system. She won the general election with 67.6 percent of the vote.

In December 2005, Watson announced her candidacy for the Howard County Council in District 1, seeking to succeed county council chairman Christopher J. Merdon. She won the general election with 52.3 percent of the vote.

In September 2013, Watson announced her candidacy for Howard County executive, seeking to succeed Ken Ulman. She was defeated by state Senator Allan Kittleman, receiving 48.7 percent of the vote in the general election.

In March 2015, Watson launched Bridge to Give, a charitable organization. The organization did not collect any money or donations, instead using Facebook as a tool to bring awareness of need in different areas of the community.

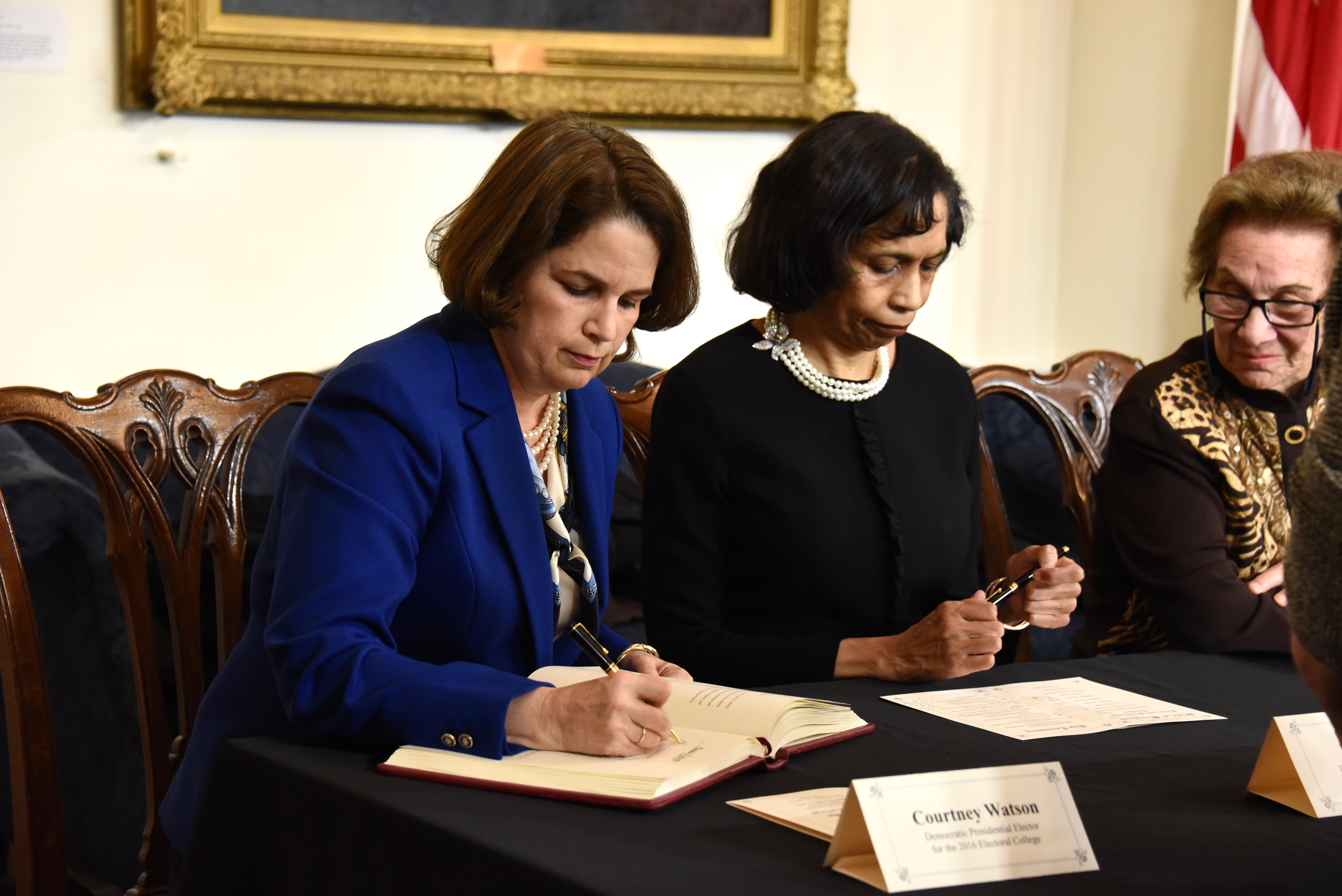
Watson as a member of the electoral college, 2016

In November 2015, Watson endorsed Hillary Clinton in the 2016 Democratic Party presidential primaries. In 2016, Watson served as DNC delegate from Maryland's 7th congressional district in the Democratic primary, pledged to Clinton. She was a presidential elector in the 2016 general election from Maryland, pledged to Clinton and Tim Kaine, when she signed a letter demanding an intelligence briefing on the alleged Russian hacking. After Clinton's defeat, Watson said she supported Electoral College reform.

Following the first Ellicott City flood, Watson led volunteer recovery and relief efforts in the city.

In August 2017, motivated by the results of the 2016 presidential election and the presidency of Donald Trump, Watson filed to run for the Maryland House of Delegates in District 9B, challenging Delegate Robert Flanagan. The district was one of the few legislative districts targeted by the Maryland Democratic Party. She won the Democratic primary with 65.6 percent of the vote. Ahead of the general election, she was endorsed by former president Barack Obama. She was criticized by progressives for supporting Governor Larry Hogan's re-election campaign over Democratic nominee Ben Jealous. She defeated Flanagan in the general election, receiving 57.4 percent of the vote.

== In the legislature ==
Watson was sworn into the Maryland House of Delegates on January 9, 2019.

In 2020, she again served as a DNC delegate from Maryland's 7th congressional district in the Democratic primary, pledged to Joe Biden. Ahead of the presidential election, Watson and Jazz Lewis led an effort to get voters to apply for mail-in ballots to vote in the election. She again applied to run as a delegate to the 2024 Democratic National Convention, pledged to Biden, but was denied by the Maryland Democratic Party.

=== Committee assignments ===
- Member, Economic Matters Committee, 2019–present (banking, consumer protection & commercial law subcommittee, 2019–present; property & casualty insurance subcommittee, 2019–present; chair, workers' compensation subcommittee, 2022–present)

=== Other memberships ===
- House Chair, Howard County Delegation, 2021–present
- Vice-Chair, Democratic Caucus, 2019–present
- Member, Maryland Legislative Transit Caucus, 2019–present
- Member, Women Legislators of Maryland, 2019–present

== Political positions ==
=== Alcohol ===
In 2021, Watson co-sponsored legislation that would allow restaurants and bars to permanently legalize alcohol delivery if it was bought along with prepared food. The bill passed and became law on May 18, 2021.

=== Education ===
During her 2002 campaign, Watson supported providing enrichment programs for children who do not qualify for gifted or special education classes. She also supported increasing pay for teachers and creating incentives to keep teachers at under-performing schools.

In September 2014, Watson unveiled a 17-point education platform as part of her campaign for Howard County executive. The plan's key points included creating an education liaison between county government and the county Board of Education, recruiting local businesses to create tech mentorships, and providing financial support to build new high schools and elementary schools to tackle school overcrowding.

=== Healthcare ===
In May 2010, Watson voted to halve funding for Healthy Howard, a county program to provide health care services to uninsured individuals, because she felt it wasn't helping enough people for the cost.

Watson supports the Affordable Care Act and expressed worries about how possible changes to it could affect Marylanders during her 2018 campaign.

=== Infrastructure ===
Watson introduced legislation in the 2019 legislative session that established a grant program to assist areas with infrastructure repairs and watershed restoration efforts associated with flood events. The bill passed and became law on May 25, 2019.

Watson introduced legislation in the 2020 legislative session that would allow local governments to seek funding from the Chesapeake Bay Restoration Fund for local climate resiliency projects. The bill passed and became law on May 8, 2020.

=== Labor ===
In February 2014, Watson said that she supported increasing the state minimum wage from $7.25 to $10.10 an hour. In December 2021, she sent a letter to the Howard County council asking its members to table legislation to raise the county's minimum wage to $16 an hour until discussions regarding minimum wage were held at the state level.

In June 2021, Watson criticized Governor Hogan's decision to end expanded unemployment benefits provided under the American Rescue Plan Act.

=== Transportation ===
During her 2014 executive campaign, Watson supported providing free bus transportation to the county's senior population.

== Electoral history ==
Howard County Board of Education primary election, 2002
| Candidate | Votes | % |
|---|---|---|
| Courtney Watson | 20,940 | 62.3 |
| Barry Tevelow | 6,955 | 20.7 |
| Arthur Neal Willoughby | 5,741 | 17.1 |

Howard County Board of Education election, 2002
| Candidate | Votes | % |
|---|---|---|
| Courtney Watson | 50,557 | 67.6 |
| Barry Tevelow | 23,865 | 31.9 |
| Write-in | 337 | 0.5 |

Howard County Council District 1 Democratic primary election, 2006
| Party | Candidate | Votes | % |
|---|---|---|---|
| Democratic | Courtney Watson | 3,807 | 100.0 |

Howard County Council District 1 election, 2006
| Party | Candidate | Votes | % |
|---|---|---|---|
| Democratic | Courtney Watson | 11,245 | 52.3 |
| Republican | Tony Salazar | 10,257 | 47.7 |
| Write-in | | 13 | 0.1 |

Howard County Council District 1 election, 2010
| Party | Candidate | Votes | % |
|---|---|---|---|
| Democratic | Courtney Watson (incumbent) | 11,638 | 52.7 |
| Republican | Robert Flanagan | 10,427 | 47.2 |
| Write-in | | 19 | 0.1 |

Howard County Executive Democratic primary election, 2014
| Party | Candidate | Votes | % |
|---|---|---|---|
| Democratic | Courtney Watson | 21,469 | 100.0 |

Howard County Executive election, 2014
| Party | Candidate | Votes | % |
|---|---|---|---|
| Republican | Allan H. Kittleman | 53,207 | 51.2 |
| Democratic | Courtney Watson | 50,543 | 48.7 |
| Write-in | | 101 | 0.1 |

Maryland House of Delegates District 9B Democratic primary election, 2018
| Party | Candidate | Votes | % |
|---|---|---|---|
| Democratic | Courtney Watson | 3,228 | 65.6 |
| Democratic | Daniel Medinger | 1,689 | 34.4 |

Maryland House of Delegates District 9B election, 2018
| Party | Candidate | Votes | % |
|---|---|---|---|
| Democratic | Courtney Watson | 11,742 | 57.4 |
| Republican | Robert Flanagan (incumbent) | 8,680 | 42.4 |
| Write-in | | 26 | 0.1 |

Maryland House of Delegates District 9B election, 2022
| Party | Candidate | Votes | % |
|---|---|---|---|
| Democratic | Courtney Watson (incumbent) | 11,287 | 65.9 |
| Republican | Lisa Kim | 5,826 | 34.0 |
| Write-in | | 15 | 0.1 |
