= Katherine Kelly =

Katherine or Kathryn Kelly may refer to:

- Katherine Kelly (actress) (born 1979), British actress
- Katherine Kelly Lang (born 1961), American actress
- Kate Kelly (sculptor) (1882–1964), American/Hawaiian sculptor
- Katherine C. Kelly (1924–2011), civil rights activist
- Kathryn Kelly (1904–1985), American criminal

== See also ==
- Kate Kelly (disambiguation)
- Catherine Kelly, Northern Irish politician
