= Joe Kelly =

Joe Kelly may refer to:

== Entertainment ==
- Joe Kelly (parenting writer) (born 1954), co-founder of the U.S. advocacy non-profit Dads and Daughters
- Joe Kelly (comics writer) (born 1971), comic book and animation writer
- Joe Kelly (General Hospital), fictional character on the ABC soap opera General Hospital
- Joey Kelly (born 1972), musician, songwriter, and athlete of Irish-American descent

== Sports ==
=== Baseball ===
- Joe Kelly (1910s outfielder) (1886–1977), outfielder in Major League Baseball, played for the Chicago Cubs, Pittsburgh Pirates, and Boston Braves
- Joe Kelly (1920s outfielder) (1900–1967), outfielder in Major League Baseball, played for the Chicago Cubs
- Joe Kelly (pitcher) (born 1988), pitcher in Major League Baseball for the St. Louis Cardinals, Boston Red Sox, Los Angeles Dodgers, and Chicago White Sox

=== Football ===
- Joe Kelly (American football) (born 1964), former NFL linebacker
- Joe Kelly (Canadian football) (1937–2022), Canadian football player
- Joe Kelly (footballer, born 1884) (1884–1961), Australian rules footballer for Geelong
- Joe Kelly (footballer, born 1907) (1907–1998), Australian rules footballer for Carlton, and coach of Footscray and South Melbourne

=== Other sports ===
- Joe Kelly (boxer) (born 1964), British bantamweight boxer
- Joe Kelly (racing driver) (1913–1993), Formula One driver
- Joe Kelly (hurler) (1923–1994), retired Irish hurler

== Other fields ==
- Joe W. Kelly (1910–1979), U.S. Air Force general
- Joe Kelly (New South Wales politician) (1905–1995), Australian politician
- Joe Kelly (Queensland politician) (born 1970), Australian politician
- Joe Kelly (Nebraska politician) (born 1956), Nebraska Lieutenant Governor

== See also ==
- Joe Kelley (1871–1943), American left fielder for the Baltimore Orioles
- Joseph Kelly (disambiguation)
