= International Association of Fire Fighters =

North American trade union

- Abbreviation: IAFF
- Formation: 1918
- Type: Trade union
- Headquarters: Washington, DC, US
- Locations: Canada; United States
- Members: 344,440 (2024)
- President: Edward Kelly
- Secretary-treasurer: Frank Lima
- Affiliations: AFL-CIO; Canadian Labour Congress
- Website: iaff.org

The International Association of Fire Fighters (IAFF) is a labor union representing paid full-time firefighters and emergency medical services personnel in the United States and Canada. The IAFF was formed in 1918 and is affiliated with the AFL–CIO in the United States and the Canadian Labour Congress in Canada. The IAFF has more than 344,440 members in its more than 3,500 affiliate organizations. Its political action committee is FIREPAC.

== History ==
The IAFF was formed in 1918. It has campaigned for better wages, benefits, working conditions and safety for union members, and for more full-time union firefighters.

== Center of Excellence for Behavioral Health Treatment and Recovery ==
The IAFF has announced plans to open the Center of Excellence for Behavioral Health Treatment and Recovery in 2017 located in Upper Marlboro, Maryland (outside Washington, DC). The center is intended for union members only and will offer treatment for post-traumatic stress and co-occurring addictions. It will also train peer support members in the treatment of post-traumatic stress and substance abuse among fire fighters.

== Legislative Conference ==
Each year the IAFF hosts a national legislative conference in Washington, DC, that is open to any IAFF member who wishes to register. Speakers have included President Bill Clinton, Vice President Joe Biden, Cabinet members of both Republican and Democratic administrations, members of Congress including the leadership of the Senate and House of Representatives, and congressional staff.

== Membership restrictions ==
IAFF as a union represents full-time paid firefighters and emergency medical technicians, and membership is not open to volunteer firefighters. Its bylaws do not allow members to work or volunteer with any other emergency service organization beyond their full-time employer, and can have their membership revoked if they do, though in practice this rarely, if ever happens.

== Fire Fighters Interested in Registration and Education Political Action Committee ==
FIREPAC (Fire Fighters Interested in Registration and Education Political Action Committee) is the federally registered political action committee of the IAFF. FIREPAC was established in 1978. During the 2009 – 2010 election cycle FIREPAC raised $5.3 million and was the tenth largest PAC in terms of donations to federal candidates. FIREPAC donates to candidates regardless of party affiliation.

== IAFF Charitable Foundation ==
The IAFF Charitable Foundation was formed in 2011. It assists IAFF union members and their families affected by natural disasters (including hurricanes, earthquakes and floods), promotes fire and burn prevention and fire fighter health and safety, and provides public education on how to prevent and recover from burn trauma.

== IAFF Fallen Fire Fighter Memorial ==
The IAFF Fallen Fire Fighter Memorial commemorates IAFF members and emergency medical services personnel who died in the line of duty. An annual Fallen Firefighters memorial ceremony is held each year in September in Colorado Springs, Colorado (with the exception of 2020 and 2021 due to the Coronavirus (Covid-19) pandemic). More than 8,800 names of IAFF members are inscribed on the wall.

== Muscular Dystrophy Association support ==
The IAFF is the largest national sponsor of the Muscular Dystrophy Association (MDA). Members raise funds primarily through the "Fill the Boot" campaign, which helps fund MDA summer camps for children, professional and public health education and other programs. Total donations since 1954 are over $558 million.

Since 1966 the International Association of Fire Fighters has appeared on and co-sponsored The Jerry Lewis MDA Labor Day Telethon.

== Leadership ==
=== Presidents ===
1918: Thomas G. Spellacy
1919: Fred Baer
1946: John P. Redmond
1957: William D. Buck
1968: William H. McClennan
1980: Jack Gannon
1988: Alfred K. Whitehead
2000: Harold A. Schaitberger
2021: Edward Kelly

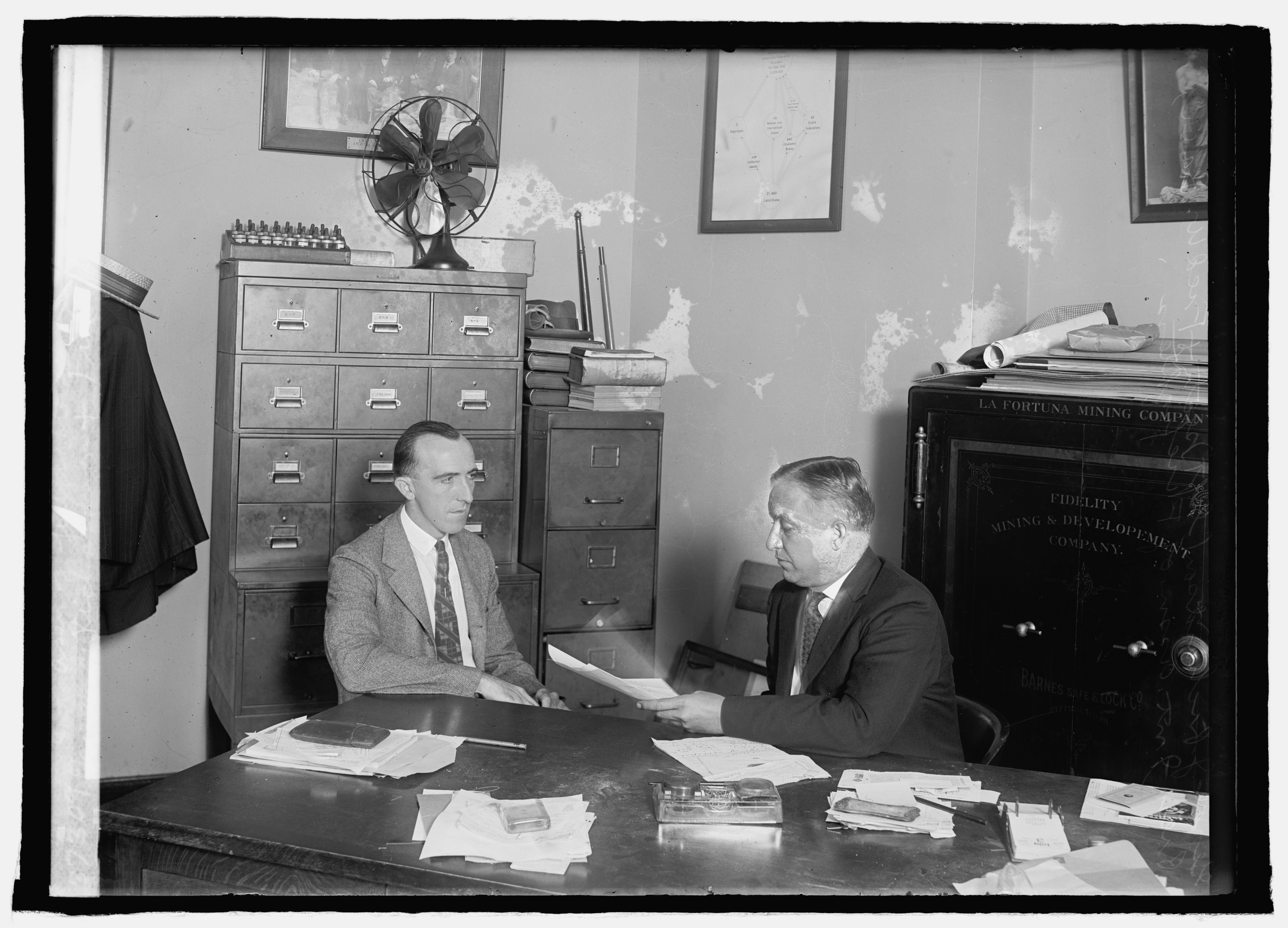
Baer and Richardson in 1925

=== Secretary-Treasurers ===
1918: William Smith
1920: George J. Richardson
1956: William D. Buck
1957: John C. Kabachus (acting)
1958: Albert E. Albertoni
1972: Frank A. Palumbo
1980: Martin E. Pierce
1982: Alfred K. Whitehead
1988: Vincent J. Bollon
2010: Thomas H. Miller
2016: Edward A. Kelly
2021: Frank V. Lima

== See also ==
- 1978 Memphis fire and police strikes - A labor dispute involving an IAFF local union
