= Dave Kelly =

Dave Kelly may refer to:

- Dave Kelly (actor), Canadian TV host and voice actor
- Dave Kelly (musician) (born 1947), British guitarist, vocalist, and member of the Blues Band
- Dave Kelly (producer) (born 1969), Jamaican songwriter, musician, engineer, producer, and owner of Madhouse Records in Jamaica
- Dave Kelly (ice hockey, born 1952), retired Canadian ice hockey player, played for the Detroit Red Wings
- Dave Kelly (ice hockey, born 1943), retired Canadian minor league ice hockey player
- Dave Kelly (politician) (born 1962), Western Australian politician
- Dave Kelly (plant ecologist), emeritus professor at the University of Canterbury

== See also ==
- David Kelly (disambiguation)
- David Kelley (disambiguation)
