= Harold A. Schaitberger =

American labor leader

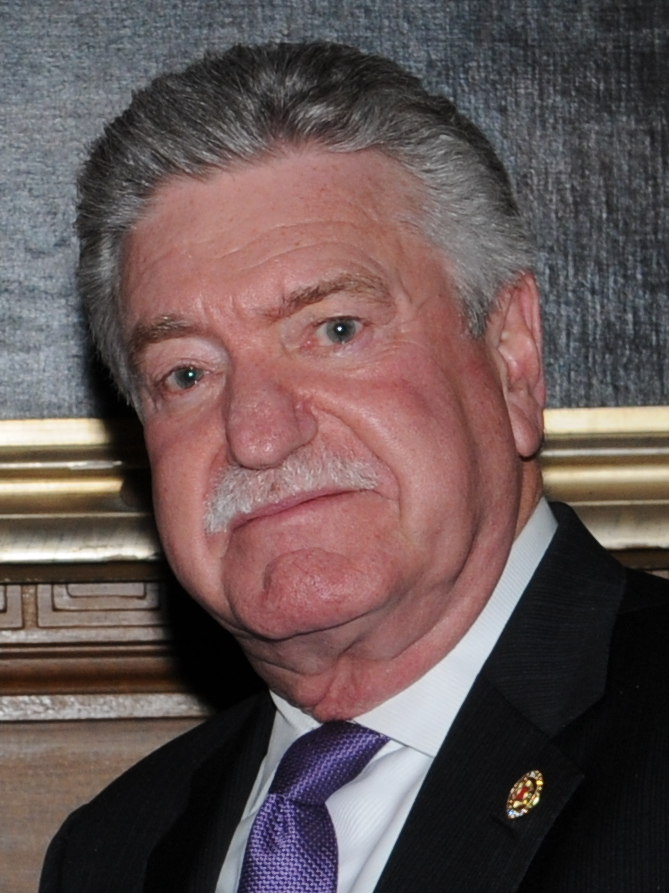

9th General President of the International Association of Fire Fighters
- In office 2000–2021
- Preceded by: Alfred K. Whitehead
- Succeeded by: Edward Kelly

Harold Allen Schaitberger (born June 24, 1946) is an American labor leader who served as General President of the International Association of Fire Fighters from 2000 to 2021.

Harold A. Schaitberger served as the ninth president in the IAFF's 100-year history, and was the first to have been elected by acclamation in 2000. He was re-elected to another four-year term in August 2016. Under his leadership, the IAFF's Political Action Committee, FIREPAC, grew to more than $4.6 million and ranks among the top one percent of PACs in the United States. Schaitberger focused on ensuring that the IAFF supported candidates and lawmakers who are friendly to firefighters and their issues, regardless of political party.

Prior to Schaitberger's first election as IAFF General President in 2000, he had served on the union's headquarters staff as a top advisor to three IAFF Presidents since 1976, and as President of the Virginia Professional Firefighters union since 1973. In 1970, he was elected as the first president of the local affiliate of the IAFF in Fairfax County, Virginia. He began his professional career as a firefighter rising to the rank of lieutenant.

Controversy and Departure In March 2020, an internal audit released by IAFF General Secretary-Treasurer Edward Kelly accused General President Harold Schaitberger of financial misconduct, including improperly receiving over $1 million from a union pension fund while continuing to draw his active executive salary. The report found these "in-service" pension payments violated IRS regulations and ERISA standards, while also raising concerns over unapproved personal reimbursements. The allegations triggered federal criminal investigations into the union's finances by the FBI, the Department of Labor, and the U.S. Attorney's Office. Though Schaitberger denied wrongdoing and an internal union committee cleared him of fault regarding pension trustee decisions, ongoing federal grand jury probes and mounting internal union pressure led Schaitberger to decline seeking re-election in March 2021, ending his 21-year presidency.
