= Ken Kelly =

Ken Kelly may refer to:

- Ken Kelly (artist) (1946–2022), American fantasy artist
- Ken Kelly (rugby league) (born 1952), English rugby league footballer
- Kenny Kelly (born 1979), American baseball player
- Kenneth Kelly (1905–1984), American football, basketball, and tennis player and coach
- Kenneth Kelly, a fictional child character in Barney & Friends

== See also ==
- Ken Kelley (disambiguation)
