= Erin Kelly =

Erin Kelly may refer to:

- Erin Kelly (author) (born 1976), British journalist
- Erin Entrada Kelly, Filipino-American writer of children's literature
- Erin I. Kelly, American philosopher

== See also ==
- Aaron Kelly (disambiguation)
- Erin Kellyman (born 1998), an English actress
