= Paula Kelly =

Paula Kelly is the name of:

- Paula Kelley (born 1971), American indie pop singer-songwriter
- Paula Kelly (singer) (1919–1992), American big band singer
- Paula Kelly (actress) (1943–2020), American actress and dancer
