= Joe Kelly (footballer, born 1884) =

Australian rules footballer

Personal information
- Full name: Joseph James Kelly
- Born: 25 March 1884; Geelong, Victoria
- Died: 2 June 1961 (aged 77); Preston, Victoria

Playing career^{1}
Years	Club	Games (Goals)
1905	Geelong	1 (0)
- ^{1} Playing statistics correct to the end of 1905.

Joseph James Kelly (25 March 1884 – 2 June 1961) was an Australian rules footballer who played with Geelong in the Victorian Football League (VFL).
