= Charlie Kelly =

Charlie Kelly may refer to:

== People ==
- Charlie Kelly (mountain biker) (born 1945), American businessman and mountain bike pioneer
- Charlie Kelly (baseball), 19th-century baseball player
- Charlie Kelly, former drummer with the rock group The Vaselines

== Fictional characters ==
- Charlie Kelly, a character in Fair City
- Charlie Kelly (It's Always Sunny in Philadelphia), character on the sitcom It's Always Sunny in Philadelphia

== See also ==
- Charles Kelly (disambiguation)
