= Ned Kelly (disambiguation) =

Ned Kelly (1854–1880) was an Australian bushranger, outlaw, gang leader and convicted police murderer.

Edmond Kelly also called Ned (1874–1955) was an Irish Catholic priest, missionary in South Africa, and British Army chaplain.

Ned Kelly may also refer to:

- Ned Kelly (1970 film), a film starring Mick Jagger and directed by Tony Richardson
- Ned Kelly (2003 film), a film starring Heath Ledger and directed by Gregor Jordan, or the subtitle of the soundtrack
- Ned Kelly (musical), a 1977 Australian musical by Reg Livermore and Patrick Flynn
- Ned Kelly (soundtrack), soundtrack album to the 1970 film, or the title track by Waylon Jennings
- Ned Kelly (1946–47), a series of 27 paintings by Sidney Nolan of the bushranger's exploits at the National Gallery of Australia
- David Kelly (association footballer) (born 1965), English footballer also known as 'Ned'
- Grevillea 'Mason's Hybrid', a grevillea cultivar marketed under the name 'Ned Kelly'
- "Ned Kelly", song by Johnny Cash, from Man in Black
- "Ballad of Ned Kelly" a song by Trevor Lucas
- Ned Kelly (play), a 1942 radio play by Douglas Stewart
  - Ned Kelly (television play), a 1959 Australian television play adapted from the radio play
- Ned Kelly Awards, Australia's leading literary awards for crime writing

== See also ==
- The Kelly Gang (disambiguation)
- Edward Kelley, an English occultist
- Cultural depictions of Ned Kelly
- The Last Outlaw, a 1980 TV mini-series
- True History of the Kelly Gang, a 2017 movie adaptation
