= Arthur Kelly =

Arthur Kelly may refer to:

- Arthur Kelly (rugby) (1886–1965), New Zealand rugby footballer
- Arthur D. Kelly (1873–1939), American politician
- Arthur Randolph Kelly (1900–1979), American archaeologist
- Arthur Rolland Kelly (1878–1959), American architect
