= Bernard Kelly (banker) =

British banker

Bernard Noel Terence Kelly
- Born: 23 April 1930; Brussels, Belgium
- Died: 16 May 2022 (aged 92)
- Education: Magdalen College, Oxford
- Occupation: Banker
- Known for: Establishment of the Eurobond market; co-founder of Compagnie Monegasque de Banque; senior roles at Lazard
- Spouse: Mirabel Magdalene Fitzalan Howard (m. 1952; died 2008)
- Children: 8

Bernard Noel Terence Kelly (23 April 1930 – 16 May 2022) was a British banker who contributed to the establishment of the Eurobond market in London during the 1960s. He later co-founded the Compagnie Monegasque de Banque and held senior positions at the merchant bank Lazard.

== Early life and education ==
Kelly was born in Brussels to Sir David Kelly, a British diplomat, and Comtesse Renée Marie Noële Ghislaine de Vaux. He was educated at Downside School in Somerset. Between 1948 and 1950, he completed National Service in the 8th Queen's Royal Irish Hussars in Aden. Kelly later studied history at Magdalen College, Oxford, but did not graduate. He qualified as a solicitor and became a partner at the law firm Simmons & Simmons.

== Career ==
In 1960, Kelly joined the merchant bank SG Warburg. He was involved in the early development of the Eurobond market and worked on transactions including a $200 million bond issue for the Irish government.

In the mid-1970s, Kelly relocated to Monaco and co-founded the Compagnie Monegasque de Banque. He returned to London in 1979 to join Lazard Brothers, where he worked during a period of restructuring at the firm.

== Personal life ==
In 1952, Kelly married Mirabel Magdalene Fitzalan Howard, with whom he had eight children. He had an interest in French culture and in his later years advised junior professionals in the finance sector. His wife died in 2008. Kelly died on 16 May 2022, at the age of 92, from complications related to Parkinson's disease.
