= Tommy Mycock =

English footballer

Personal information
- Full name: Thomas Mycock
- Date of birth: 22 August 1923
- Place of birth: New Silksworth, England
- Date of death: 17 June 1988 (aged 64)
- Place of death: Morecambe, England
- Position: Wing half

Youth career
- Swansea Town
- Silksworth Colliery Welfare

Senior career*
Years	Team	Apps	(Gls)
1946–1947	Southport	19	(3)
1947–1948	Aldershot	16	(4)
- Distillery
1950–1952	Brentford	0	(0)
1952–1954	Tranmere Rovers	46	(2)
1954–1955	Bradford City	21	(3)
- New Brighton
Total		102	(12)

International career
1950	Irish League XI	1	(0)
- * Club domestic league appearances and goals

Thomas Mycock (22 August 1923 – 17 June 1988) was an English professional footballer who played as a wing half in the Football League for Tranmere Rovers, Bradford City, Southport and Aldershot.

== Career statistics ==
Appearances and goals by club, season and competition
Club	Season	League			FA Cup		Other		Total	
Club	Season	Division	Apps	Goals	Apps	Goals	Apps	Goals	Apps	Goals
Southport	1946–47	Third Division North	19	3	0	0	5 (Note: 3 appearances and 1 goal in Liverpool Senior Cup, 2 appearances in Lancashire Senior Cup)	1	24	4
Career total			19	3	0	0	5	1	24	4
