= Kieran Kelly =

Kieran Kelly may refer to:

- Kieran Kelly (jockey) (1978–2003), Irish jump jockey
- Kieran Kelly (hurler), hurler for Antrim, Northern Ireland
- Kieran Patrick Kelly, Irish suspected serial killer
