= Raymond Kelly (disambiguation) =

Raymond Kelly or Ray Kelly may refer to:

== Sportspeople ==
- Ray Kelly (footballer) (born 1976), Irish soccer striker
- Ray Kelly (referee), Irish Gaelic games match official
- Ray Kelly (rugby league), Australian rugby league footballer
- Ray Kelly (sportswriter) (1914–1988), American journalist for Philadelphia Evening Bulletin
- Ray Kelly (born 1946), former ARCA Menards Series West driver
- Ray Kelly (tennis), Australian tennis player

== Other ==
- Raymond Kelly (born 1941), American law enforcement; former New York City Police Commissioner
- Raymond C. Kelly (born 1942), American cultural anthropologist, ethnologist, and academic
- Ray Kelly (EastEnders), fictional character introduced in 2018
- Thomas Kelly (GC) (Thomas Raymond Kelly, 1928–1947), British Merchant Navy seaman posthumously awarded the George Cross
- Ray "Gunner" Kelly (1906–1977), Australian police officer
- Raymond Kelley (1938–2025), American cellist
- Ray Kelly (singer) (born 1953), Irish singing priest

== See also ==
- Kelly (disambiguation)
