= Edward Kelly (labor leader) =

American labor leader

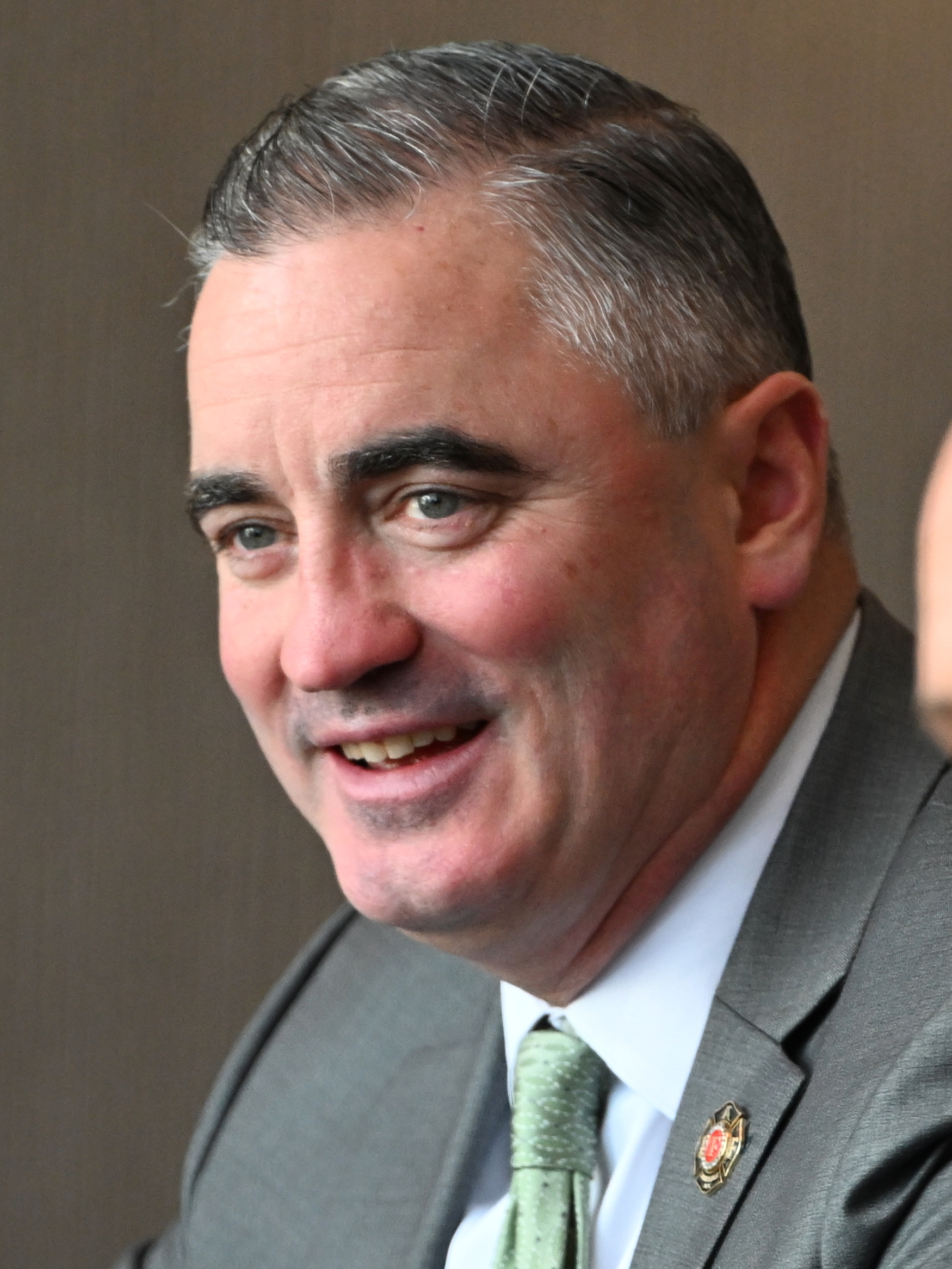
- Kelly in 2025

10th General President of the International Association of Fire Fighters
- Incumbent
- Assumed office 2021
- Preceded by: Harold A. Schaitberger

Edward A. "Edzo" Kelly is an American firefighter and trade union leader. Kelly joined the Boston Fire Department in 1997. He has been General President of the International Association of Fire Fighters (IAFF) since 2021 when he defeated Mahlon Mitchell of Wisconsin. Labor Notes described Kelly as a reflection of "the insular “old school” culture of this public sector craft union." Kelly replaced Harold A. Schaitberger, who did not seek re-election. Prior to being elected president, he had been president of both Boston's and Massachusetts' firefighters unions.
