= O'Kelly =

O'Kelly or Kelly is an Irish surname. It derives from the Kings of Uí Maine.

Notable people with the surname include:

- Aloysius O'Kelly (1853–1936), Irish painter, brother of James Joseph O'Kelly
- Auguste O'Kelly (1829–1900), music publisher in Paris
- Christopher O'Kelly (1895–1922), Canadian recipient of the Victoria Cross
- Don O'Kelly (1924–1966), American actor
- Edward Peter O'Kelly (1846–1914), Irish politician
- Gabriel O'Kelly (died 1731), Irish clergyman
- George O'Kelly (1831–1914), Franco-Irish pianist and composer
- Henri O'Kelly (1859–1938), Franco-Irish composer, pianist and organist
- James O'Kelly (1735–1826), American Methodist clergyman
- James O'Kelly (politician) (1845–1916), Irish politician, brother of Aloysius O'Kelly
- John J. O'Kelly (1872–1957), Irish politician
- Joseph O'Kelly (1828–1885), Franco-Irish composer and pianist
- Malcolm O'Kelly (born 1974), Irish rugby player
- Roger Demosthenes O'Kelly (1880–1962), African-American lawyer
- Seán T. O'Kelly (1882–1966), Irish politician, second President of Ireland
- Seumas O'Kelly (1881–1918), Irish writer
- Grayson O'Kelly (born 2011),

== Fictional characters ==
- Manuel Garcia O'Kelly-Davis, protagonist of The Moon Is a Harsh Mistress by Robert A. Heinlein
- Michael the O'Kelly, hero of seven books by Manning O'Brine
- One of the titular families in The Kellys and the O'Kellys, the second novel of Anthony Trollope

== See also ==
- Albéric O'Kelly de Galway (1911–1980), Belgian chess grandmaster
- Mary O'Kelly de Galway (1905-1999), Irish Belgian resistance operative
