= Noel Kelly =

Noel Kelly may refer to:

- Noel Kelly (agent), Irish talent agent at the centre of the Ryan Tubridy secret payments scandal
- Noel Kelly (footballer) (1921–1991), Irish association football player
- Noel Kelly (rugby league) (1936–2020), Australian rugby league player
- Noel Kelly, musician in The Hush Now
