= Edward Kelly (cricketer) =

English cricketer

Edward Arthur Kelly (26 November 1932 – 7 October 1998) was an English cricketer active from 1956 to 1957 who played for Lancashire. He was born in Bootle and died in Leyland. He appeared in four first-class matches as a righthanded batsman who bowled right arm fast medium pace. He scored 38 runs with a highest score of 16* and held one catch. He took four wickets with a best analysis of three for 77.
