= Bernie Kelly =

Bernie Kelly may refer to:

- Mike Kelly (baseball, born 1896) (1896–1968), also known as Bernie Kelly, American baseball coach and manager
- Bernie Kelly (footballer) (1932–2004), Scottish footballer
- Bernie Kelly, character in Fair City
- Bernie Kelly (Redwater), character in Redwater

== See also ==
- Bernard Kelly (disambiguation)
