= Martin Kelly =

Martin Kelly may refer to:

- Martin Kelly (footballer) (born 1990), English footballer
- Martin Kelly (Gaelic footballer), scored a goal in the 1934 All-Ireland Senior Football Championship final
- Martin Kelly (judoka) (born 1973), Australian judoka
- Martin Kelly (musician) (born 1965), British musician and record label boss
- Martin Kelly (rugby union) (born 1989), Irish rugby union player
- Martin Kelly (politician) (1842–1890), irish-born American politician in California
