= Bernard Kelly (footballer) =

English footballer

Personal information
- Full name: Bernard Alexander Kelly
- Date of birth: 21 August 1928
- Place of birth: Kensington, England
- Position: Outside right

Senior career*
Years	Team	Apps	(Gls)
–1949	Chelsea		
1949–1950	Bath City	33	(19)
1950–1952	Brentford	1	(1)
- Deal Town
- * Club domestic league appearances and goals

Bernard Alexander Kelly (born 21 August 1928) is an English retired professional footballer who played in the Football League for Brentford as an outside right.

== Career statistics ==
Appearances and goals by club, season and competition
Club	Season	League			FA Cup		Total	
Club	Season	Division	Apps	Goals	Apps	Goals	Apps	Goals
Brentford	1950–51	Second Division	1	0	0	0	1	0
Career total			1	0	0	0	1	0
