= David Kelly (Australian footballer) =

Australian rules footballer

Personal information
- Full name: David Kelly
- Born: 18 September 1953 (age 73)
- Original team: St Kevin's Old Boys
- Height: 199 cm (6 ft 6 in)
- Weight: 100 kg (220 lb)

Playing career^{1}
Years	Club	Games (Goals)
1975–76	Melbourne	3 (0)
- ^{1} Playing statistics correct to the end of 1976.

David Kelly (born 18 September 1953) is a former Australian rules footballer who played with Melbourne in the Victorian Football League (VFL).
