= Rozie Kelly =

English novelist

- Born: Rose Amelia Kelly; 1988/1989; Oxford, England
- Education: University of Warwick (BA); University of Manchester (MA)
- Years active: 2023–present
- Website: roziekelly.com

Rose Amelia Kelly (born 1988/1989), known professionally as Rozie Kelly, is an English novelist. Her debut novel Kingfisher (2025) was shortlisted for the Women's Prize for Fiction.

== Early life ==
Kelly was born in Oxford. Kelly returned to education at age 27. She graduated with a Bachelor of Arts (BA) in English Literature from the University of Warwick. She then completed a Master of Arts (MA) in Creative Writing at the University of Manchester in 2020.

== Career ==
Kelly began her post-MA career working for the Arvon Foundation. An extract from Kelly's work-in-progress Salt Tooth was shortlisted for the 2023 PFD Queer Fiction Prize in the Adult category. That summer, Kelly was selected for Protoype Publishing's 2024 inaugural Development Programme. Kelly's short story "The Woman Who Turner into a Jellyfish" received the 2025 Aurora Prize for Writing's Third Prize in the Short Fiction category.

The manuscript for Kelly's debut novel Kingfisher won the 2024 NorthBound Book Award. Through the prize, Saraband Book acquired the rights to publish the novel in 2025. Kingfisher was shortlisted for the 2026 Women's Prize for Fiction.

== Personal life ==
After completing her MA, Kelly moved to Hebden Bridge.

== Bibliography ==
- Kingfisher (2025)

== Accolades ==
Year	Award	Category	Title	Result	Ref.
2023	PFD Queer Fiction Prize	Adult	Salt Tooth	Shortlisted	
2024	NorthBound Book Award		Kingfisher	Won	
2025	Aurora Prize for Writing	Short Fiction	"The Woman Who Turned into a Jellyfish"	3rd	
2026	Women's Prize for Fiction		Kingfisher	Shortlisted	
