= Leo Kelly =

Australian journalist (1914–2007)

Patrick Leo Kelly
- Born: 1914; Scotland
- Died: 22 August 2007 (aged 92–93)
- Occupations: Journalist, publicist, writer, public activist

Patrick Leo Kelly (1914–2007) was a journalist, publicist, writer and public activist. Initially a journalist, he was a successful publicist for public charities and a campaigner for the interests of indigenous Australians. Well known to Australian newspaper readers in the 1950s and 1960s for his historical features on a wide variety of topics in the Daily Mirror and other tabloids.

He had innumerable artistic and literary pursuits, and his tastes were eclectic. He published poetry and plays, and in his youth was an accomplished actor.

== Family views ==
Like many people at the time, their anti-fascist views led them to the far Left. They were members of the Australian Communist Party, and Kelly claimed all his life to be an adherent of Marxism, though he could never be described as orthodox. Naomi Kelly developed a public speaking career as a columnist on Australian Broadcasting Commission current affairs broadcasts. Helping her research and polish her presentations, Leo discovered his own talents for analysis and presentation of complex materials.. Medically excluded from military service in World War II, he became a journalist on the Young Mercury, transferring to the Canberra Times under the legendary Bill Shakespeare. At one stage posted to cover General Douglas MacArthur's wartime operations from his headquarters in Brisbane, Leo took up a position in the Department of Information in Melbourne in the post-war era.

Returning to the private sector following the dismantling of the DOI by the incoming government of Robert Menzies, Leo brought his young family to Sydney in 1948. In 1950 they settled down in the far southern suburb of Heathcote, surrounded by his beloved Royal National Park. His constant roaming of this subtropical forest region, which he was to leave only after his final illness, was a great source of spiritual strength.

== Becoming an activist ==
In the 1960s, Kelly moved from journalism to public relations, becoming the national publicity officer for the Freedom From Hunger Campaign (which sent him on a memorable research visit to India and Sri Lanka), and for Tranby College, an institution serving indigenous youth in Glebe, Sydney. His interest in indigenous affairs grew stronger in later life. In 1981 he launched a major campaign entitled Operation Aborigine, and was campaign director for the Aboriginal leader Burnum Burnum's bid for a Senate seat in the 1980s.

Leo launched Goorialla, of which he was editor and principal writer, as a media vehicle for Operation Aborigine.

Leo kept up his historical writing throughout his life, commencing an epic research project into the history of the Australian Overland Telegraph Line in the 1960s. He worked through the archives in the State Library of South Australia in Adelaide, then traveled up the route of the "OT" from Adelaide to Darwin, by bus, car and on foot. Long delayed by his other commitments, the resulting Waddilecki the String was published in 2004 when he was 90.

While notionally an atheist in line with the teachings of Marx and Engels, Leo Kelly was in fact of a spiritual bent and was intrigued by mystical traditions in Buddhism, and Sufism in the Islamic world. He eventually found his transcendental moorings in Vedanta, to which he had been introduced by writers he respected like Christopher Isherwood and Aldous Huxley.

Leo Kelly died on 22 August 2007 after a long illness.
