= Paddy Kelly (Australian footballer) =

Australian rules footballer

Personal information
- Full name: Paddy Kelly
- Born: 8 February 1896
- Died: 30 October 1970 (aged 74)
- Original team: Paddington

Playing career^{1}
Years	Club	Games (Goals)
1920	St Kilda	7 (0)
- ^{1} Playing statistics correct to the end of 1920.

Paddy Kelly (8 February 1896 – 30 October 1970) was an Australian rules footballer who played with St Kilda in the Victorian Football League (VFL).
