= David Kelley =

David Kelley may refer to:

- David H. Kelley (1924–2011), American archaeologist, epigrapher and Mayanist scholar
- David G. Kelley (born 1928), American politician in the state of California
- David Kelley (poet) (1941–1999), British poet and scholar; co-founder of Black Apollo Press
- David Kelley (philosopher) (born 1949), American philosopher and author.
- David Douglas Kelley (1951–1996), Canadian LGBT and AIDS activist
- David M. Kelley (born 1951), American designer and businessman
- David E. Kelley (born 1956), American television writer and producer
- David N. Kelley (born 1959), American attorney and former United States Attorney

== See also ==
- David Kelly (disambiguation)
