= Alfred K. Whitehead =

American labor union leader (1929–2021)

Alfred K. Whitehead (October 12, 1929 – September 5, 2021) was an American labor union leader.

Born in Lennox, California, Whitehead studied at the East Los Angeles College, and then the University of California at Los Angeles. He joined the International Brotherhood of Electrical Workers in the late 1940s. In 1954, he began working for the Los Angeles Fire Department, and joined the International Association of Fire Fighters (IAFF). He was elected as president of his local union in 1970. He was also active in the Federated Fire Fighters of California, promoting its political activity and improving its financial position.

In 1982, Whitehead was elected as full-time secretary-treasurer of the IAFF, in which role he established a line-item budget, and averted a potential bankruptcy of the union. In 1988, he was instead elected as president of the union, defeating incumbent leader Jack Gannon. He also served as a vice-president of the AFL-CIO. In 2000, he retired from his union posts. From 2001 to 2005, he served on California's Public Employment Relations Board.

Trade union offices
| Preceded by Martin E. Pierce | Secretary-Treasurer of the International Association of Fire Fighters; 1982–1988 | Succeeded by Vincent J. Bolton |
| Preceded by Jack Gannon | President of the International Association of Fire Fighters; 1988–2000 | Succeeded by Harold A. Schaitberger |
