= Henry Kelly (cricketer) =

South African cricketer (1898–1983)

Personal information
- Born: 29 July 1898; Lady Frere, South Africa
- Died: 1 July 1983 (aged 84); East London, South Africa
- Source: Cricinfo, 6 December 2020

Henry Kelly (29 July 1898 – 1 July 1983) was a South African cricketer. He played in seventeen first-class matches from 1920/21 to 1926/27.
