= Kemesha Kelly =

Kemesha Alecia Kelly
- Born: 22 June 1989 (age 36); St.Ann, Jamaica
- Known for: JCDC Festival Queen (2012)
- Website: kemeshakelly.com

Kemesha Kelly (born 1989) is a former JCDC Festival Queen. She was crowned Miss Jamaica Festival Queen for Jamaica's Fiftieth Anniversary of Independence (6 August 2012).

In 2007, she was part of the three-member team that represented Jamaica and the Caribbean region at the British Parliament World Slavery Youth Debate in Westminster, England.

In her adult life, she has remained active in advocating for youth and was the civil society representative who signed Jamaica's 2013 Social Partnership Agreement.
