= Jack Gannon (unionist) =

American labor union leader (1923-1997)

John A. Gannon (September 16, 1923 – May 31, 1997) was an American labor union leader.

Born in Cleveland, Gannon was educated at Miami University and the University of Glasgow. During World War II, he served in a naval intelligence unit. In 1949, he became a firefighter, in Cleveland, and joined the International Association of Fire Fighters. He was elected as president of his local in 1970. In 1980, he was elected as president of the union, serving until 1988. While leader of the union, he focused on improving the health and safety of firefighters, and created the IAFF Burn Foundation, which funded research into the treatment of burns.

In 1989, Gannon was appointed to the National Council on Disability. He served under Reagan and Bush, then Bill Clinton appointed him as acting chair of the council. He died of leukemia in 1997.

Trade union offices
Preceded by Howie McClennan	President of the International Association of Fire Fighters; 1980–1988	Succeeded by Alfred K. Whitehead
