= Kate Kelly =

Kate Kelly is the name of:

- Kate Kelly (politician), 21st century Idaho state senator
- Kate Kelly (outlaw) (1863–1898), sister of outlaw Ned Kelly
- Kate Kelly (sculptor) (1882–1964), American-Hawaiian sculptor
- Kate Kelly (camogie), Wexford camogie player
- Kate Kelly (feminist) (born 1980), Washington, D.C. lawyer, and founder of Ordain Women
- Kate Kelly (journalist) (born 1975), American journalist

== See also ==
- Katherine Kelly (disambiguation)
