= Joseph Kelly =

Joseph Kelly may refer to:

== Politics ==
- Joseph D. Kelly (New York City) (1887–1953), New York politician and judge
- Joseph J. Kelly (1897–1963), mayor of Buffalo, New York from 1942 to 1945
- Joseph L. Kelly (1867–1925), Virginia judge and politician
- Joe Kelly (Nebraska politician) (born 1956), American attorney and Nebraska Lieutenant Governor
- Joseph P. Kelly (New York politician) (1894–1968), New York politician
- Joseph Kelly (New South Wales politician) (1855–1931), Australian politician
- Joe Kelly (Queensland politician) (born 1970, Joseph Patrick Kelly), Australian politician

== Other ==
- Joseph Kelly (crimper) (died 1900s), Portland crimper
- Joseph D. Kelly (sound engineer) (died 2006), American sound engineer
- Joseph Anthony Kelly (born 1958), Catholic writer, editor and publisher
- Joseph Kelly (academic) (born 1962), professor of English

== See also ==
- Joe Kelly (disambiguation)
- Joe Kelley, American baseball player
