= Cyril Bacon =

English footballer

Personal information
- Full name: Cyril William Bacon
- Date of birth: 9 November 1919
- Place of birth: Hammersmith, England
- Date of death: 26 March 2001 (aged 81)
- Place of death: Broward County, Florida, United States
- Position: Wing half

Senior career*
Years	Team	Apps	(Gls)
19??–1946	Hayes		
1946–1950	Leyton Orient	118	(3)
1950–1951	Brentford	0	(0)
1951–1952	Dartford		
1952–1954	Tunbridge Wells Utd		
1954–1956	Ashford Town	29	(9)
- * Club domestic league appearances and goals

Cyril William Bacon (9 November 1919 – 26 March 2001) was an English professional footballer who played as a wing half for Leyton Orient, making 118 appearances in the Football League.

Bacon joined Orient in June 1946 and made his league debut against Southend United in the following September. He made 121 league and cup appearances for Orient, scoring three goals, in four seasons before being released in May 1950 when he signed for Brentford

After a season with Brentford (where he didn't make a first team league appearance) he moved into non-league football: firstly for one season with Southern League club Dartford; then onto two Kent League clubs, Tunbridge Wells Utd again for two seasons, then Ashford Town for just over one season.
