= Ryan Kelly =

Ryan Kelly may refer to:

- Ryan Kelly (actor), Scottish born actor
- Ryan Kelly (American football) (born 1993), American football player
- Ryan Kelly (baseball) (born 1987), American baseball player
- Ryan Kelly (basketball) (born 1991), American professional basketball player
- Ryan Kelly (comics) (born 1976), American comic book artist
- Ryan Kelly (singer) (born 1978), Irish singer with Celtic Thunder
- Ryan Kelly (photojournalist) (born 1986), American photojournalist

== See also ==
- Ryan Kelley (born 1986), actor
