= James M. Kelly (Maryland politician) =

American politician (born 1960)

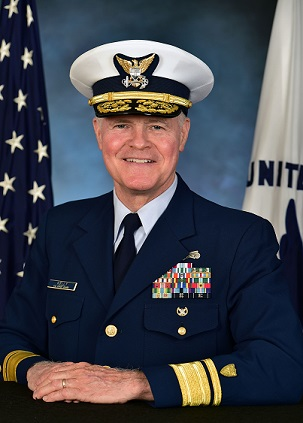
- Kelly in August 2020

Assistant Commandant for Reserve
- In office June 14, 2021 – June 18, 2022
- Preceded by: Todd C. Wiemers
- Succeeded by: Miriam L. Lafferty

Member of the Maryland House of Delegates from the 9B district
- In office January 11, 1995 – August 31, 2001
- Succeeded by: Melissa J. Kelly

Personal details
- Born: July 5, 1960 (age 66) Cleveland, Ohio, U.S.
- Party: Republican

James M. Kelly (born July 5, 1960) is a Washington, D.C. lobbyist and a former Maryland politician. He was first elected in 1994 to represent District 9B, which covers a portion of Baltimore County, Maryland. An officer in the United States Coast Guard Reserve, he became Assistant Commandant for Reserve in Washington, DC, on June 14, 2021.

== Background ==
Kelly was first elected in 1994 when he defeated Democrat Stephen W. Lafferty for the new District 9B seat. Previously, there was a District 9 that was served by Gerry L. Brewster, John J. Bishop, and Martha Scanlan Klima. Klima went on to win District 9A's election. In the 1998 Republican primary election, Kelly was unchallenged. Furthermore, he was unchallenged in the general election, as well.

Kelly resigned from his position in 2001 and was replaced by his wife, Melissa J. Kelly, by Governor Parris Glendening. Kelly resigned his position as he was appointed by President George W. Bush to serve in the White House as his Special Assistant for Intergovernmental Affairs.

== Education ==
Kelly Attended Towson High School in Towson, Maryland. After serving time in the military, Kelly joined the Maryland State Police and went to college, receiving his B.S. in business administration and finance from the University of Maryland University College in 1988.

While working in the White House, Kelly earned his Master of Arts degree in National Security and Strategic Studies through the U.S. Naval War College.

== Career ==
As mentioned previously, Kelly enlisted in U.S. Coast Guard Reserves in 1977 and attended Officer Candidate School, graduating in 1990. He has since been promoted to rear admiral. Kelly was also a Maryland State Trooper for the Maryland State Police from 1984 until 1989.

Kelly worked as a commercial lending and troubled-loan restructuring officer from 1989 until 1994. He was a small business owner from 1995 until 1997. In 2001, Kelly was hired as senior advisor to Undersecretary for Memorial Affairs for the U.S. Department of Veterans Affairs.

Kelly received numerous awards during his career. He is a member of the Reserve Officers Association and the Maryland Troopers Association. He was a recipient of the Award for Duty Beyond the Call of Duty as Maryland State Trooper, which he received in 1985. He also received the award for Outstanding Junior Officer from the U.S. Coast Guard Marine Safety Office in 1994. He holds a Certificate of Achievement from the Maryland Federation of College Republicans in 1995. In 1996, he was selected as Legislator of the Year by the Alliance for the Mentally Ill . Additionally, he was selected as Outstanding Junior Officer in entire Fifth District from the U.S. Coast Guard in 1997. Also in 1997, Kelly received the Certificate of Achievement from the Maryland Association of Psychiatric Support Services.

In 2001, as mentioned previously, Kelly was tapped by President Bush to work for the White House. Kelly was responsible for briefing the President on state, local, and tribal issues throughout the United States.

In 2005, together with Ken Meyer, Duane Parde and Daniel J. Ostergaard, he opened a lobbying firm in DC.

== Election results ==
- 1998 Race for Maryland House of Delegates – District 9B

Voters to choose one:

Name	Votes	Percent	Outcome
James M. Kelly, Rep.	9,514	100%	Won

- 1994 Race for Maryland House of Delegates – District 9B

Voters to choose one:

Name	Votes	Percent	Outcome
James M. Kelly, Rep.	7,343	56%	Won
Stephen W. Lafferty, Dem..	5,823	44%	Lost
