= Charles S. Kelley =

Baptist Pastor, former NOBTS seminary president, and active Southern Baptists Leader

Charles S. Kelley (born July 27, 1952) is an American pastor, evangelist, author, and former president of the New Orleans Baptist Theological Seminary (NOBTS). He is known for serving as the seminary’s eighth president. Kelley is a predominant leader within the Southern Baptist Convention (SBC), the largest Protestant denomination in the United States, and has written extensively on evangelism and denominational identity.

== Early life and education ==
Kelley was born in Beaumont, Texas, and was ordained for gospel ministry in 1972 at First Baptist Church of Beaumont. He earned a bachelor's degree from Baylor University before moving to New Orleans in 1975 to pursue graduate studies at NOBTS, completing a Master of Divinity in biblical studies and a Doctor of Theology with a concentration in preaching.

== Presidency of NOBTS ==
Kelley served as the eighth president of NOBTS from 1996 to 2019. Highlights of his presidency include his leadership during the aftermath of Hurricane Katrina, the introduction and expansion of online learning programs for pastoral training, and his emphasis on evangelism as a core institutional priority.

== Publications ==
Kelley has authored books such as The Best Intentions: How a Plan to Revitalize the SBC Accelerated Its Decline and co-authored The Baptist Faith & Message (2008 edition). His writing has primarily focused on the mission and work of the Southern Baptist Convention (SBC).

== Retirement and later work ==
Kelley has spent much of his retirement urging the SBC to reclaim what he describes as its historic missional identity and emphasis on evangelism. He has expressed concern that the SBC is losing its sense of identity by shifting focus away from evangelism, baptisms, and financial support for the Cooperative Program.
