= Melissa J. Kelly =

Maryland politician

Member of the Maryland House of Delegates from District 9B
- In office October 9, 2001 – January 11, 2002
- Preceded by: James M. Kelly
- Succeeded by: Emil B. Pielke

Personal details
- Born: December 28, 1962 (age 63) Silver Spring, Maryland
- Party: Republican
- Profession: teacher

Melissa J. Kelly (born December 28, 1962) was appointed in 2001 to represent District 9B, which covers a portion of Baltimore County, Maryland.

== Education ==
Kelly attended Towson State University, where she earned a B.S. degree in biology with honors in 1987.

== Career ==
Kelly was employed as a biology teacher by Towson Catholic High School. In August 2001, her husband James M. Kelly resigned from the Maryland House of Delegates to join the George W. Bush administration. She was appointed to complete his unexpired term, but resigned in January 2002. Emil B. Pielke was then appointed to complete the remainder of her husband's unexpired term.
