= Charles Kelly =

Charles Kelly may refer to:

== Military ==
- Charles E. Kelly (soldier) (1920–1985), United States Army soldier and recipient of the United States Medal of Honor
- Charles L. Kelly (1925–1964), United States Army helicopter pilot during the Vietnam War

== Sport ==
- Charles Kelly (American football) (born 1967), American football coach
- Charles Kelly (footballer) (1894–1969), footballer who played in the Football League for Tranmere Rovers and Stoke
- Chip Kelly (Charles Edward Kelly, born 1963), American football coach

== Others ==
- Bert Kelly (1912–1997), full name Charles Robert Kelly, Australian politician
- Charles Kelly (historian) (1889–1971), American historian and superintendent of Capitol Reef National Park
- Charles E. Kelly (cartoonist) (1902–1981), Irish cartoonist and founder of the magazine Dublin Opinion
- Charles H. Kelly (1833–1911), president of the Methodist Conference in 1889 and 1905

== See also ==
- Charlie Kelly (disambiguation)
- Charles Kelley (disambiguation)
