= Alex Kelly =

Alex Kelly may refer to:

- Alex Kelly (rapist) (born 1967), American convicted rapist from Connecticut
- Alex Kelly (The O.C.), fictional character played by Olivia Wilde in the U.S. television series The O.C.
- Alex Kelly (rugby union) (c. 1871–c. 1913), Australian rugby union player
- Alex Kelly (filmmaker) (born c. 1979), Australian filmmaker

== See also ==
- Alexander Kelly (disambiguation)
- Alexandra Kelly, UK-based entrepreneur
