= Alexander Kelly (disambiguation) =

Alexander Kelly (1840–1907) was a Union Army soldier during the American Civil War.

Alexander Kelly may also refer to:

- Alexander Kelly (pianist) (1929–1996), Scottish pianist and composer
- Alexander Kelly, Australian winemaker and wine writer; founder of Tintara Winery

== See also ==
- Alex Kelly (disambiguation)
