= HireRight =

American employment screening company

HireRight Holdings Corporation
- Type: Private
- Traded as: NYSE: HRT
- Industry: Pre-employment screening
- Founded: 1995; 31 years ago
- Headquarters: Nashville, Tennessee, U.S.
- Key people: Euan Menzies
- Services: Background check
- Revenue: ▲US$722 million (2023)
- Owners: General Atlantic; Stone Point Capital
- Number of employees: 3,190 (2023)
- Website: hireright.com

HireRight is a global family of background screening companies based in Nashville, Tennessee, United States, and registered in Delaware. In 2012, its HireRight Solutions Inc. entity was the first employment background screening firm the Federal Trade Commission (FTC) ever charged with violating the Fair Credit Reporting Act (FCRA).

Although the company became public via an initial public offering in 2021 with a listing on the New York Stock Exchange, in 2024, private equity firms General Atlantic and Stone Point Capital acquired the company for $1.65 billion. The transaction closed on June 28, 2024.

== Acquisitions and mergers ==
=== Powerchex ===
On June 23, 2010, HireRight announced that it had acquired Powerchex, a UK-based pre-employment screening company specialising in the financial services sector in the City of London. Powerchex was a full member of the UK chapter of the National Association of Professional Background Screeners or NAPBS, and was started by Alexandra Kelly in 2005 who is the former managing director and owner of the company.

In October 2010, Powerchex was rebranded as HireRight.

Both Powerchex and Kroll Background Screening (below) are now fully owned subsidiaries of HireRight.

=== Kroll ===
On August 3, 2010, HireRight then-parent company Altegrity Risk International announced it had completed the acquisition of Kroll Inc. from Marsh & McLennan Companies in an all-cash transaction valued at US$1.13 billion. In October 2010, Kroll Background Worldwide was rebranded as HireRight.

On March 13, 2018, it was reported that Duff & Phelps Corp. would buy Kroll, Inc. (which did not include background screening portion of the former Kroll business that had been rebranded with HireRight brands). On June 4, 2018, the transaction was completed.

=== General Information Services ===
On Friday, May 25, 2018, HireRight and General Information Services (GIS) announced their intent and agreement to a merger. The companies announced the closing of the merger on July 12, 2018. The resulting combined group is the largest provider of background screening services in the United States. Following the merger, HireRight rebranded, with both HireRight and GIS using the new branding.

=== J-Screen and PeopleCheck ===
On October 12, 2019, HireRight announced the acquisition of J-Screen in Japan and PeopleCheck in Australia.

== Legal issues with service ==
HireRight was the subject of a number of class-action and FCRA lawsuits. In 2011 the company paid $28 million to plaintiffs who accused HireRight of failing to provide copies of reports to job applicants and failing to resolve disputes. And on August 8, 2012, the US Department of Justice announced HireRight settled charges of violating the FCRA for $2.6M.

Companies that use background check services must follow FCRA procedures or face class-action liability with millions of dollars in exposure. According to a Wall Street Journal investigation into hiring practices in the trucking industry, class-action lawsuits were brought against trucking companies over how they use HireRight. HireRight customer U.S. Xpress settled in 2013 for $2.75M, and Swift in 2014 for $4.4M over their failure to disclose hiring practices.

== See also ==
- Background check
- Criminal record check
- Governance, risk management, and compliance
- Human resources
- Recruitment
- Security clearance
- Vetting
