= Alexandra Filia Kelly =

British businesswoman

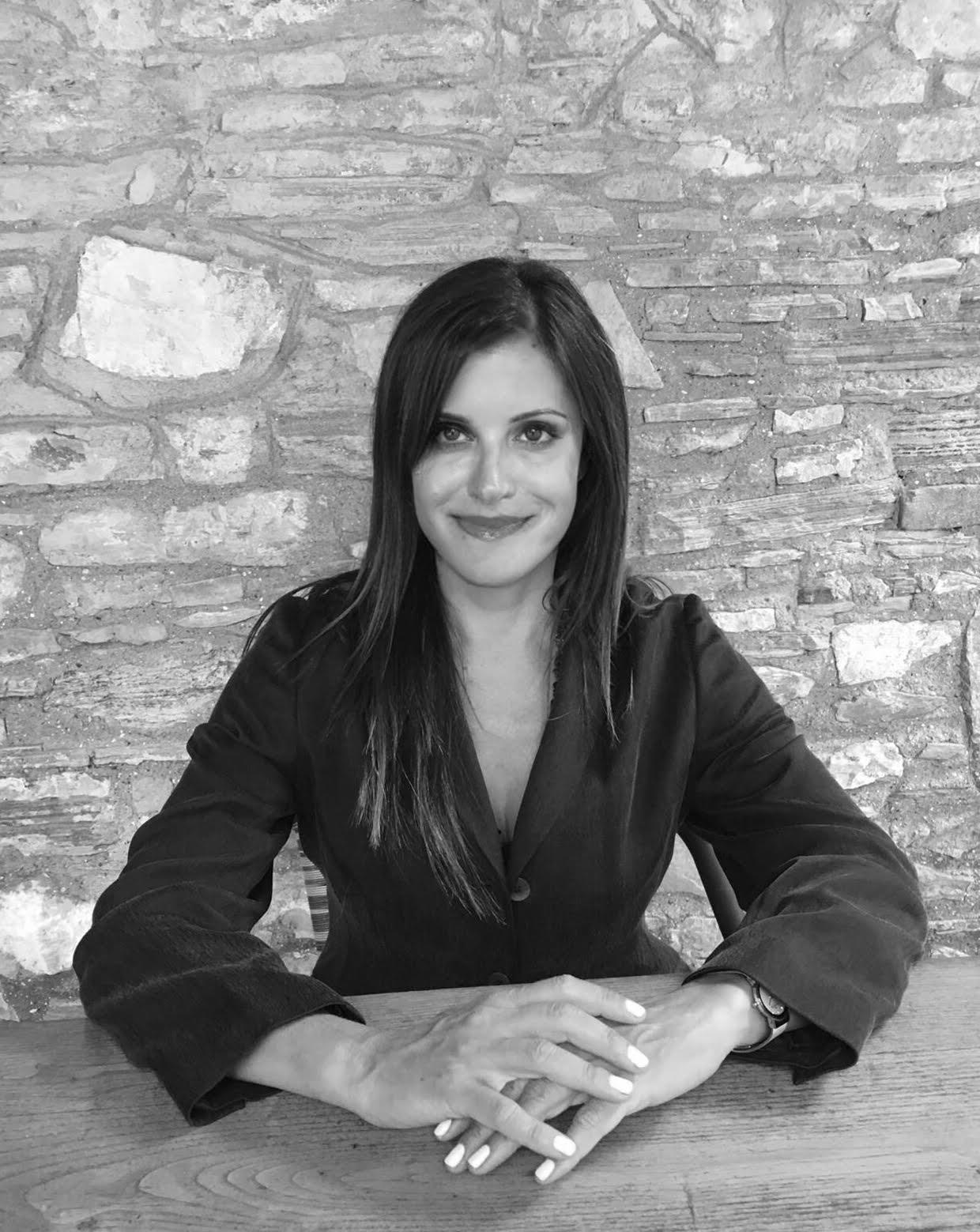
- Born: Greece
- Education: University of Rochester

Alexandra Filia Kelly is the founder and former managing director of UK pre-employment screening company, Powerchex, and formerly the MD of HireRight's background screening operations in Europe, the Middle East and Africa (EMEA).

Alexandra was born and raised in Greece and moved to the United States aged 25 to study for an MBA at one of the top business schools. She arrived in the UK in 2000 - interrupting a round the world sailing trip with her husband - after discovering she was expecting their first child.

In 2005 she started Powerchex, a pre-employment screening firm specifically targeted at the London financial sector. Seeking investment, she went to face the BBC’s Dragons' Den to pitch her business. The Dragons rejected her idea and said it couldn’t be done. Alexandra decided to go for it on her own, hired one employee and found a small office. On June 23, 2010, California based HireRight Inc., a U.S. background screening company, announced that it had acquired Powerchex, with Alexandra being made Managing Director of HireRight's background screening operations in the EMEA region.

In 2007 she won 'Business Person of the Year' in the Thames Gateway Business Awards, whilst also guiding Powerchex to awards for 'Growth Business' and 'Business of the Year'. In 2008 Powerchex was awarded the NatWest Thames Gateway Business of the Year. In 2009, Powerchex won the DBC & East London Chamber of Commerce Business of the Year award.

Alexandra was profiled in UK newspaper The Financial Times explaining the processes behind Powerchex and where she attributes her success. In August 2009 she was interviewed on BBC News about research which found that the number of job applicants lying on their CVs has been increasing since the beginning of the recession.

In 2011 and 2018, Alexandra was interviewed by the Financial Times on her views on the issues surrounding the sale of a business.

In 2019, Alexandra published her first book of the Dream Series of book for the modern woman: Love Is A Game, A Marriage Proposal In 90 days, followed by the second book of the series: The Good Breakup, Take a Deep Breath and Remember Who the F**k you Really Are and the third: Forever Young, An Anti-Ageing Guide for the Terrified.

Also in 2019 Alexandra published her first novel: As if I am not there.
