= 1915–16 Queens Park Rangers F.C. season =

English football club season

Queens Park Rangers
1915–16 season
- Chairman: J. H. Fielding
- Manager: James Howie
- Stadium: Kensal Rise
- 1915–16 London Combination Principal: 8th
- 1915–16 London Combination (Supplementary): 13th
- Top goalscorer: Arthur Humphreys 9
- Highest home attendance: 6,000 (Oct 23 1915) vs Chelsea
- Lowest home attendance: 1,500 (Jan 1 1916) Vs Crystal P, (Mar 4 1916) Vs Clapton Orient
- Biggest win: 5–1 (Jan 1 1916) Vs Crystal
- Biggest defeat: 0–6 (Feb 12 1916) vs Watford
Home colours	Away colours

The 1915–16 Queens Park Rangers season was the club's 28th season of existence and their first season in The London Combination, a competition made up of reserve and senior teams founded during World War I. QPR finished 9th in the Principal league and 13th in the supplementary league during the campaign.

== League table ==
=== London Combination Principal Tournament Table 1915/16 ===
Pos	Club	P	W	D	L	F	A	GA	Pts
6	Tottenham Hotspur	22	8	8	6	38	35	1.727	24
7	Brentford	22	6	8	8	36	40	1.636	20
8	Queens Park Rangers	22	8	3	11	27	41	1.227	19
9	Crystal Palace	22	8	3	11	35	55	1.590	19

=== London Combination (Supplementary) Table 1915/16 ===
Pos	Club	P	W	D	L	F	A	GA	Pts
11	Arsenal	14	3	4	7	22	44	1.571	10
12	Luton Town	14	4	1	9	31	44	2.214	9
13	Queens Park Rangers	14	2	5	7	14	37	1.000	9
14	Reading	14	3	2	9	23	64	1.642	8

=== Results ===
QPR scores given first

Win Draw Loss

=== London Combination Principal Tournament ===
Date	Venue	Opponent	Result	Score F–A	Scorers	Attendance	League Position
4 September 1915	A	Millwall	L	1–3	Humphreys	7,000	10
11 September 1915	H	Croydon Common	W	2–1	Fox, Coleman	3,000	9
18 September 1915	A	Arsenal	L	1–2	Humphreys	8,000	10
25 September 1915	H	Brentford	L	1–2	Humphreys	3,500	9
2 October 1915	A	West Ham	L	1–2	Fox	4,000	10
9 October 1915	H	Tottenham	L	0–4		4,000	12
16 October 1915	A	Crystal P	L	0–1		1,000	12
23 October 1915	H	Chelsea	W	1–0	Coleman	6,000	12
30 October 1915	H	Fulham	W	2–1	Humphreys 2	3,000	10
6 November 1915	A	Clapton Orient	W	2–0	Dale, Simons	3,000	9
13 November 1915	H	Millwall	L	1–5	Baldock	3,000	10
20 November 1915	A	Croydon Common	W	1–0	Humphreys	1,000	10
27 November 1915	H	Arsenal	D	1–1	Hicks	2,000	9
4 December 1915	A	Brentford	L	0–4		1,200	10
11 December 1915	H	West Ham	D	1–1	Dale	2,000	10
18 December 1915	A	Tottenham	L	1–2	Simons	3,000	10
25 December 1915	A	Watford	L	1–5	Humphreys	500	10
27 December 1915	H	Watford	W	3–1	Humphreys, Nisbet 2	2,000	10
1 January 1916	H	Crystal P	W	5–1	Hughes (og), Baldock, Fox, Humphreys, Nisbet	1,500	9
8 January 1916	A	Chelsea *	L	1–5	Mitchell (pen)	10,000	10
15 January 1916	A	Fulham	W	1–0	Mitchell	5,000	8
22 January 1916	H	Clapton Orient	D	0–0		2,000	8

=== London Combination (Supplementary) Tournament ===
Date	Venue	Opponent	Result	Score F–A	Scorers	Attendance	League Position
5 February 1916	H	Chelsea	L	0–3		3,000	13
12 February 1916	A	Watford	L	0–6		1,000	14
19 February 1916	H	Brentford	D	1–1	Simons	2,500	14
4 March 1916	H	Clapton Orient	D	1–1	Wagstaffe	1,500	13
11 March 1916	A	Tottenham	D	0–0		3,000	12
18 March 1916	H	Watford	D	2–2	Birch, Thompson	2,000	11
25 March 1916	A	Brentford	L	0–4		2,000	13
1 April 1916	H	Reading	L	2–6	Hicks, Mitchell	3,000	14
8 April 1916	A	Clapton Orient	D	1–1	Hicks	1,500	13
15 April 1916	H	Tottenham	L	1–3	Dale	4,000	14
21 April 1916	A	Millwall	L	2–6	Donald 2	5,000	14
22 April 1916	A	Reading	W	2–1	Fox, Simons		13
24 April 1916	H	Millwall	W	2–0	Broster, Simons	3,000	12
29 April 1916	A	Chelsea	L	0–3		12,000	13

== Squad ==
Position	Nationality	Name	London Combination Appearances	London Combination Goals
GK	(England)	Jack Durston		
GK	(England)	Wilf Nixon	11	
GK	(England)	F. Matthews	6	
GK	(England)	Harry Jefferies	19	
DF	(England)	Basil Loney	26	
DF	(England)	Billy Draper	16	
DF	(England)	Joe Wingrove	1	
DF	(England)	Harry Pullen	11	
DF	(England)	Joseph Wilde		
DF	(England)	Tom Millington		
DF	(England)	Bill Hooper	5	
DF	(England)	George Somerville	6	
DF	(England)	H. Green		
DF	(England)	Oscar Linkson	17	
DF	(England)	Smith, A G	4	
MF	(England)	John Pennifer		
MF	(England)	David Nisbet	14	1
MF	(England)	Jack Gregory	8	
MF	(England)	Archie Mitchell	31	3
MF	(England)	John Baldock	19	2
MF	(England)	Jack Broster	1	1
MF	(England)	Alf Whyman	15	
MF	(England)	George Fox	35	4
MF	(England)	Bill Wake	31	
MF	(England)	H. Matthews	3	
FW	(England)	David Donald	10	2
FW	(England)	Jimmy Birch	3	1
FW	(England)	Billy Thompson	2	1
FW	(England)	George Dale	24	3
FW	(England)	Tommy Simons	17	5
FW	(England)	Ben Ives	1	
FW	(England)	Alfred Hicks	20	3
FW	(England)	Tim Coleman	6	2
FW	(England)	Arthur Humphreys	22	9
FW	(England)	T. Hughes	1	
FW	(England)	Freddie Blake	1	
GK	Guest	Smith, B	1	
DF	Guest	Bellamy, George	1	
MF	Guest (Gainsborough Trinity)	Hunter, Joe	1	
MF	Guest (Dartford)	Elliott, J	1	
FW	Guest (Tooting Town)	Nicholson, Ernest	1	
FW	Guest (The Army)	Poulton, A (Pte)	1	
FW	Guest	Jackman, Vincent	1	
FW	Guest (The Army)	Walsh, H (Pte)	1	
FW	Guest	Wagstaffe, George	1	1
FW	Guest (The Army)	McRae (Pte)	1	

== Transfers in ==
Name	from	Date	Fee
Smith, A G		cs1915	
Oscar Linkson	Shelbourne	cs1915	
Robinson, T	Catford Southend	cs1915	
David Nisbet	London Caledonians	cs1915	
Arthur Humphreys	Hampstead Town	cs1915	
Wilf Nixon	Fulham	Sep 11,1915	Loan
Tim Coleman	Nottingham	Sep 11,1915	Loan
George Dale	Notts County	Oct1915	Loan
Harry Jefferies		Oct1915	
Alfred Hicks	Ilford	Oct1915	
Matthews, H W		Nov1915	
Bill Hooper	Hampstead Town	Feb1916	
George Somerville		Feb1916	
Hughes, T		Mar1916	
Green, H		cs1916	
Bennett, F		cs1916	

== Transfers out ==
Name	from	Date	Fee	Date	To	Fee
McLeod, Bob	Newport	May 4, 1914		cs 15	Clyde	
Weblin, Francis *	West Norwood	cs1912		cs 15		
Nitschke, William *	Kilburn	cs1914		cs 15		
Ovens, Gilbert	Chelsea	July 17, 1911	Free	cs 15		
Downing, Alfred		cs1914		cs 15		
Amstad, Jonas		June1914		cs 15		
Cannell, Alfred		July1914		cs 15		
Keech, George *		Apr1915		cs 15		
Tim Coleman	Nottingham	Sep 11,1915	Loan	Oct 15	Nottingham	Loan
McKinney, Edward	Broom Athletic	May 16, 1914		Oct 15	Dipton U	
Smith, A G		cs1915		Nov 15		
Miller, John	Vale of Leven	May 5, 1913		Dec 15	Dumbarton	
Matthews, H W		Nov1915		Feb 16		
Wilf Nixon	Fulham	Sep 11,1915	Loan	Mar 16	Fulham	Loan
Butler, Albert (Ben)	Hartlepools U	Sep 1,1913		May 16	Died in WW1	
Matthews, F W *	Hampstead Town	cs1913		cs 16		
Jefferies, Harry		Oct1915		cs 16		
Payne, Arthur	Old Crusaders	Aug1914		cs 16		
Robinson, T	Catford Southend	cs1915		cs 16		
Hughes, T		Mar1916		cs 16		
Cannell, Alfred		July1914		cs 16		
Arthur Humphreys	Hampstead Town	cs1915		cs 16		
