= Football Battalion =

17th (Service) Battalion, Middlesex Regiment
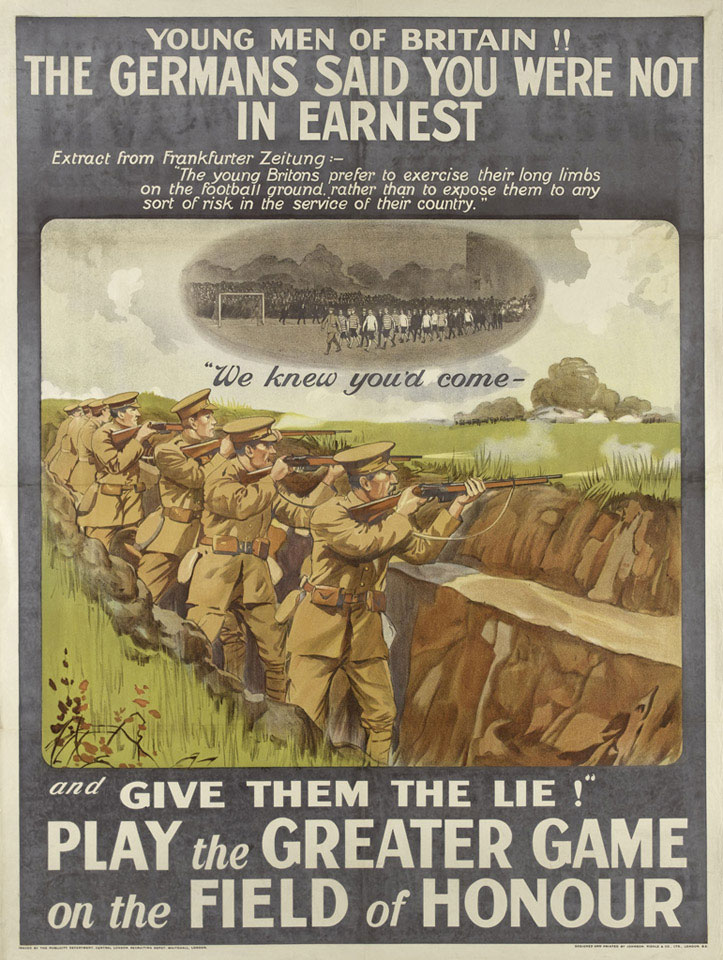
- Recruitment poster featuring the Football Battalion
- Active: 12 December 1914
- Country: United Kingdom
- Branch: British Army
- Type: Battalion
- Role: Infantry
- Size: 600 troops
- Nicknames: "The Football Battalion" "1st Football"

The 17th (Service) Battalion, Middlesex Regiment was an infantry battalion of the Middlesex Regiment, part of the British Army, which was formed as a Pals battalion during the Great War. The core of the battalion was a group of professional footballers, which was the reason for its most commonly used name, The Football Battalion (also the footballers' or players' battalion). The 23rd (Service) Battalion, Middlesex Regiment was formed in June 1915 and became known as the 2nd Football Battalion. The battalions fought in the Battle of the Somme in 1916 among others. Soldiers who fought in the 17th and 23rd Battalions included Second Lieutenant Walter Tull, who was possibly the first black infantry officer in the British Army.

== History ==
=== 17th (Service Battalion) ===
During the First World War there had been an initial push by clubs for professional football to continue, in order to keep the public's spirits up. This stance was not widely agreed with and public opinion turned against professional footballers. One soldier, serving in France, wrote to a British newspaper to complain that "hundreds of thousands of able-bodied young roughs were watching hirelings playing football" while others were serving their country. The suggestion was even made that King George V should cease being a patron of The Football Association.

William Joynson-Hicks formed the battalion on 12 December 1914 at Fulham Town Hall after Secretary of State for War, Lord Kitchener, suggested it as part of the Pals battalion scheme. England international Frank Buckley became the first player to join, out of thirty players who signed up at its formation. The formation was announced to the general public on 1 January 1915.

During training, the players were allowed leave on a Saturday to return to their clubs to take part in games. However, the clubs found themselves having to subsidise the train fares as the Army did not pay for them.

By March 1915, 122 professional footballers had signed up for the battalion, which led to press complaints as there were some 1800 eligible footballers. These recruits included 41 players, staff and supporters of Clapton Orient (later to be known as Leyton Orient) and 16 Heart of Midlothian players signed up for the 16th Royal Scots ('McCrae's Battalion'). In addition to footballers, officials and referees also joined the 17th, along with football fans themselves. Many football players deliberately chose to avoid the battalion by joining other regiments, causing the War Office to initially have difficulties filling the battalion.

A number of decorations were issued to the soldiers with the battalion. Lyndon Sandoe, of Cardiff City, was awarded the Distinguished Conduct Medal with bar, and the Military Medal. The battalion suffered heavy losses, including at the Battle of Delville Wood and the Battle of Guillemont during the Battle of the Somme. During the First World War, the battalion lost more than a thousand men, including 462 in one battle alone at the Battle of Arras in 1917.

The 17th was assigned to the 6th Infantry Brigade, part of the 2nd Infantry Division.

=== 23rd (Service Battalion) ===
A second football battalion, the 23rd (Service) Battalion was formed in June 1915. Former Tottenham Hotspur and Clapton Orient footballer Alan Haig-Brown was appointed commanding officer in September 1916.

The 23rd was assigned to the 123rd Brigade, part of the 41st Division.

== Legacy ==
A memorial to the Football Battalion was unveiled in 2010 in Longueval, France. It was attended by members of the Football Supporters' Federation and representatives of more than 20 clubs. It had been paid for through donations received from football supporters having been promoted by former professional footballer and SAS soldier Phil Stant. The ceremony was conducted by Father Owen Beament of Millwall and a two-minute silence was initiated by Gareth Ainsworth.

A granite memorial to the three Clapton Orient players who died in the Battle of the Somme whilst members of the battalion was unveiled in 2011, located in the village of Flers, Northern France. Over 200 Leyton Orient supporters travelled for the unveiling, which commemorated the lives of Richard McFadden, William Jonas and George Scott. A second memorial to commemorate the Clapton Orient side that served on the Somme, was installed and dedicated at the National Memorial Arboretum on Sunday, 23 October 2022. The memorial was unveiled by former O's captain Dean Smith and Stephen Jenkins, chairman of the O's Somme Memorial Fund.

== Key ==
- Players listed in **bold** won full international caps.

=== Playing positions ===
GK	Goalkeeper	RB	Right back	RW	Right winger	DF	Defender	HB	Half back	IF	Inside forward	DM	Defensive midfielder
OL	Outside left	LB	Left back	LW	Left winger	CB	Centre back	FW	Forward	FB	Full back	RM	Right midfielder
W	Winger	MF	Midfielder	ST	Striker	WH	Wing half	AM	Attacking midfielder	CM	Central midfielder	LM	Left midfielder
U	Utility player	OR	Outside right	SW	Sweeper	LH	Left half	RH	Right half				

== Soldiers ==
=== Officers ===
Rank	Name	Nationality	Position	Club prior to enlistment	Battalion(s)	Wartime death date	Wartime death place	Decorations	Notes	Ref
Lt Col	Alan Haig-Brown	England	OR	Clapton Orient	23rd	25 March 1918 (aged 40)	Nord-Pas-de-Calais, France	DSO, MiD	(Note: Appointed commanding officer of the 23rd Battalion on 16 September 1916.)	
Maj	**Frank Buckley**	England	DF	Bradford City	17th	—	—	—	(Note: Transferred in from the King's Regiment (Liverpool).)	
Cpt	Percy Barnfather	England	WH	Croydon Common	17th	—	—	MC	(Note: Commissioned on 31 October 1916.)	
Cpt	Edward Bell	England	OF	South Farnborough	17th	24 March 1918 (aged 31–32)	Somme, France	MC and Bar	(Note: Also served as the battalion's adjutant.)	
Cpt	**Vivian Woodward**	England	CF	Chelsea	17th	—	—	—	(Note: Previously served in the London Regiment prior to being commissioned into the Middlesex Regiment on 29 December 1914.)	
2nd Lt	Walter Tull	England	IF/HB	Northampton Town	17th, 23rd	25 March 1918 (aged 29)	Nord-Pas-de-Calais, France	MiD	(Note: Served in the 17th Battalion prior to being commissioned into the 23rd Battalion on 4 August 1917.)	

=== Senior non-commissioned officers ===
Rank	Name	Nationality	Position	Club prior to enlistment	Battalion(s)	Wartime death date	Wartime death place	Decorations	Notes	Ref
CSM	Tommy Gibson	Scotland	FB	Nottingham Forest	17th	—	—	—		
CSM	Richard McFadden	Scotland	FW	Clapton Orient	17th	23 October 1916 (aged 26–27)	Somme, France	MM		
CSM	Joe Smith	England	HB	Chesterfield	17th	13 November 1916 (aged 26–27)	Pas-de-Calais, France	MiD		
CSM	Lyndon Sandoe	Wales	FB	Cardiff City	17th	—	—	DCM and Bar, MM		
CSgt	Fred Bartholomew	England	OR	Reading	17th	—	—	—		
CSgt	Fred Parker	England	FW	Clapton Orient	17th	—	—	—		
Sgt	William Baker	England	WH	Plymouth Argyle	17th	22 October 1916 (aged 32–33)	Somme, France	MM		
Sgt	Ernie Coquet	England	FB	Fulham	17th	—	—	—	(Note: Later served in the Army Cyclist Corps and the Royal Engineers.)	
Sgt	Robert Dalrymple	Scotland	IF	Clapton Orient	17th	—	—	—		
Sgt	Nolan Evans	England	LB	Clapton Orient	17th	—	—	—		
Sgt	Harry Gibson	England	LH	Clapton Orient	17th	—	—	—	(Note: Served in the 17th Battalion prior to being commissioned into the Royal Guernsey Light Infantry on 24 August 1918.)	
Sgt	Fred Goodwin	England	OL	Exeter City	17th	—	—	—	(Note: Also served as a bomb-throwing instructor.) (Note: Later served in the London Regiment.)	
Sgt	Ted Hanney	England	CH	Manchester City	17th	—	—	—		
Sgt	Jimmy McCormick	England	RH	Plymouth Argyle	17th	—	—	—	(Note: Taken prisoner of war on 8 August 1916.)	
Sgt	Joe Mercer	England	CH	Nottingham Forest	17th	—	—	—	(Note: Taken prisoner of war on 27 April 1917.)	
Sgt	Sam Morris	England	WH	Bristol Rovers	17th	—	—	—		
Sgt	Charles Stewart	England	IF	Croydon Common	17th	—	—	—		
Sgt	Arthur Whalley	England	WH	Manchester United	23rd	—	—	—		
Sgt	Norman Wood	England	IL	Stockport County	17th	28 July 1916 (aged 26–27)	Delville Wood, France	—		
Sgt	Maurice Woodward	England	HB/LB	Southend United	17th	—	—	—		
Act Sgt	George Beech	England	LB	Brighton & Hove Albion	17th	—	—	—	(Note: Appointment, not rank.)	
Act Sgt	**Fred Keenor**	Wales	DF	Cardiff City	17th	—	—	—		
Lce Sgt	**Jack Cock**	England	CF	Huddersfield Town	17th	—	—	—		
Lce Sgt	George McDonald	Scotland	OR	Norwich City	17th	—	—	—		

=== Junior non-commissioned officers ===
Rank	Name	Nationality	Position	Club prior to enlistment	Battalion(s)	Wartime death date	Wartime death place	Decorations	Notes	Ref
Cpl	Ben Butler	England	CH	Queens Park Rangers	17th	13 May 1916 (aged 27–28)	Bruay-la-Buissière, France	—		
Cpl	**Jack Doran**	Ireland	CF	Coventry City	17th	—	—	MM		
Cpl	Alfred Edwards	England	CH	Coventry City	17th, 13th	4 November 1918 (aged 28–29)	—	—		
Cpl	George Ford	England	LB	Woolwich Arsenal	17th	—	—	—	(Note: Medically discharged on 10 October 1917.)	
Cpl	David Gray	Scotland	FW	St Mirren	17th	—	—	—		
Cpl	Jimmy Hugall	England	GK	Clapton Orient	17th	—	—	—	(Note: Served in the 17th Battalion prior to being commissioned into the Durham Light Infantry on 24 July 1916.)	
Cpl	George Pyke	England	CF	Newcastle United	17th	—	—	—		
Cpl	Arthur Roe	England	HB	Luton Town	17th	—	—	—		
Cpl	George Saunders	n/a	n/a	Clapton Orient	17th	—	—	—		
Cpl	Billy Spittle	England	IF	Woolwich Arsenal	17th	—	—	—	(Note: Medically discharged on 3 May 1918.)	
Cpl	Sandy Turnbull	Scotland	IF	Unattached	23rd	3 May 1917 (aged 32)	Chérisy, France	—	(Note: Transferred to the East Surrey Regiment in July 1916.) (Note: Died while serving with another unit.)	
Act Cpl	William Krug	England	GK	Chelsea	17th	—	—	—		
Lce Cpl	Joe Bailey	England	IF	Reading	17th	—	—	DSO, MC and Two Bars, MiD	(Note: Served in the 17th Battalion prior to being commissioned into the Royal Norfolk Regiment on 28 August 1917.) (Note: Decorations were won while serving with another unit.)	
Lce Cpl	Charlie Bell	Scotland	FW	Chesterfield	17th	—	—	—	(Note: Transferred to the Labour Corps and later commissioned.)	
Lce Cpl	**Fred Bullock**	England	DF	Huddersfield Town	17th	—	—	—		
Lce Cpl	Charles Bunyan, Sr.	England	GK	Standard Liège (manager)	17th	—	—	—		
Lce Cpl	Herbert Dersley	England	n/a	Croydon Common	17th	1 June 1916	Pas-de-Calais, France	—		
Lce Cpl	Edward Foord	England	FW	Chelsea	17th	—	—	—	(Note: Appointment, not rank. Medically discharged on 16 October 1918.)	
Lce Cpl	Pat Gallacher	Scotland	OF	Ton Pentre	17th, 23rd	—	—	—	(Note: Served as trainer of the battalion football team in June 1917.) (Note: Transferred to the Rifle Brigade on 27 May 1918.)	
Lce Cpl	Norman Holmes	England	DF	Clapton Orient	17th	—	—	—	(Note: Served in the 17th Battalion prior to being commissioned into the 21st Battalion on 25 June 1918.)	
Lce Cpl	Robert Houston	n/a	n/a	Woolwich Arsenal	17th	—	—	—		
Lce Cpl	Tom Pearson	n/a	n/a	Clapton Orient	17th	—	—	—	(Note: Served in the 17th Battalion prior to being commissioned into the Queen's Own (Royal West Kent Regiment) on 28 August 1917.)	
Lce Cpl	Henry Pennifer	England	HB	Queens Park Rangers	17th	24 March 1918	Somme, France	—		
Lce Cpl	Sidney Wheelhouse	England	RB	Grimsby Town	17th	19 September 1916 (aged 27–28)	Somme, France	—		

=== Ranks ===
Rank	Name	Nationality	Position	Club prior to enlistment	Battalion(s)	Wartime death date	Wartime death place	Decorations	Notes	Ref
Pte	Charles Abbs	n/a	n/a	Norwich City	17th	—	—	—		
Pte	Tommy Barber	England	HB/IL	Aston Villa	17th	—	—	—		
Pte	Jasper Batey	England	LH	Brighton & Hove Albion	17th	23 October 1916 (aged 25)	Pas-de-Calais, France	—		
Pte	Billy Booth	England	CH	Brighton & Hove Albion	17th	—	—	—		
Pte	Jack Borthwick	Scotland	CH	Millwall Athletic	17th	—	—	—		
Pte	George Bowler	England	RH	Tottenham Hotspur	17th, 23rd	—	—	—		
Pte	James Bowler	England	DF	Crystal Palace	17th	—	—	—		
Pte	David Chalmers	Scotland	CF	Grimsby Town	17th	—	—	—		
Pte	Tommy Codd	England	OL	Leicester Fosse	17th	—	—	—	(Note: Transferred to the Royal Army Service Corps and was medically discharged on 26 June 1918.)	
Pte	**Tim Coleman**	England	FW	Nottingham Forest	17th	—	—	—		
Pte	George Crowther	England	FW	Hurst	17th	—	—	MM	(Note: Transferred to the Labour Corps.)	
Pte	William Daley	England	n/a	Chelsea	17th	8 August 1916 (aged 30–31)	Guillemont, France	—		
Pte	Sam Davis	England	RB	Plymouth Argyle	17th	—	—	MM	(Note: Served in the 17th Battalion prior to being commissioned into the Duke of Cornwall's Light Infantry on 31 October 1917.)	
Pte	Charles Dexter	England	FB	Brighton & Hove Albion	17th	27 June 1917 (aged 26–27)	Derby, England	—	(Note: Medically discharged on 10 April 1916 and later died of septic poisoning.)	
Pte	John Dunn	England	IR	Luton Town	17th	—	—	—	(Note: Was released/discharged from the army before seeing active service.)	
Pte	Jack Dodds	England	FW	Oldham Athletic	17th	—	—	—		
Pte	Jack Durston	England	GK	Queens Park Rangers	17th	—	—	—		
Pte	Joe Fidler	England	FB	Port Vale	17th	—	—	—		
Pte	Allen Foster	England	IF	Reading	17th	8 August 1916 (aged 28–29)	Corbie, France	—		
Pte	Robert Frith	England	HB	Luton Town	17th	—	—	—		
Pte	Hugh Gallacher	Scotland	LH	Bristol Rovers	17th	—	—	—		
Pte	Billy Gerrish	England	IF	Unattached	17th	8 August 1916 (aged 31)	Delville Wood, France	—		
n/a	David Girdwood	n/a	FB	Chelsea	17th	—	—	—		
Pte	Charles Green	England	RB	Millwall Athletic	17th	28 April 1917 (aged 35)	Oppy Wood, France	—		
Pte	Haydn Green	England	IR	Reading	17th	—	—	—		
Pte	Alf Gregson	England	FW	Grimsby Town	17th	—	—	—		
Pte	Albert Holmes	England	OL	Coventry City	17th	—	—	—		
Pte	Henry Hogarth	England	HB	Burnley	17th	—	—	—		
Pte	**Percy Humphreys**	England	IR	FC Basel (manager)	17th	—	—	—		
Pte	Hunter	n/a	FW	Gainsborough Trinity	17th	—	—	—		
Pte	Harry Iremonger	England	GK	Nottingham Forest	17th	—	—	—		
Pte	William Jonas	England	FW	Clapton Orient	17th	27 July 1916 (aged 25)	Delville Wood, France	—		
Pte	Billy Jones	England	CF	Brighton & Hove Albion	17th	—	—	—		
Pte	David Kenny	Scotland	CH	Grimsby Town	17th	—	—	—		
—	Eddie King	England	RH	Clapton Orient	17th	—	—	—	(Note: Transferred to The Queen's (Royal West Surrey Regiment).)	
Pte	John Lamb	England	HB	The Wednesday	17th	—	—	—		
Pte	Frank Lindley	England	OR	Luton Town	17th	—	—	—		
Pte	Oscar Linkson	England	FB	Shelbourne	17th	8 August 1916 (aged 28)	Somme, France	—		
Pte	Tommy Lonsdale	England	GK	West Ham United	17th	—	—	—		
Pte	Frank Martin	England	DF	Grimsby Town	17th	—	—	—		
Pte	Tom McKenna	Ireland	FB	Grimsby Town	17th	—	—	—		
Pte	Joe McLauchlan	Scotland	CF	Watford	17th	—	—	—	(Note: Served in the 17th Battalion before transferring to the Suffolk Regiment prior to June 1916. Medically discharged in 1917.)	
Pte	Billy Middleton	England	FW	Crystal Palace	17th	—	—	—		
Pte	Arthur Mounteney	England	IF	Hinckley Athletic	17th	—	—	—		
Pte	Archie Needham	England	U	Brighton & Hove Albion	17th	—	—	—		
Pte	Thomas Newton	England	GK	Croydon Common	17th	—	—	—	(Note: Taken prisoner of war on 13 November 1916.)	
Pte	Wilf Nixon	England	GK	Fulham	17th	—	—	—	(Note: Taken prisoner of war on 28 April 1917.)	
Pte	John Nuttall	England	HB	Millwall Athletic	17th	—	—	—		
Pte	William Oliver	England	OL	Tottenham Hotspur	17th	—	—	—	(Note: Medically discharged on 15 September 1916.)	
Pte	Joseph Orme	England	GK	Millwall Athletic	17th	—	—	—		
Pte	Alonzo Poulton	England	IR	West Bromwich Albion	17th	—	—	—		
Pte	Thomas Ratcliff	n/a	n/a	Woolwich Arsenal (trainer)	17th	—	—	—		
Pte	Joseph Raw	n/a	FB	Clapton Orient	17th	—	—	—		
Pte	Jumbo Reason	England	LB	Clapton Orient	17th	—	—	—		
Pte	William Reed	England	CF	Brighton & Hove Albion	17th	—	—	—		
Pte	Stan Ripley	England	HB	Stoke City	17th	10 March 1917 (aged 23–24)	Sunderland, England	—		
Pte	Hugh Roberts	Wales	OR	Luton Town	17th	—	—	—		
Pte	George Robertson	Scotland	LH/IL	Birmingham	17th	—	—	—		
Pte	Harry Robotham	England	RH	Retired	23rd	12 September 1916 (aged 37)	Somme, France	—		
Pte	Fred Robson	England	FB	Southend United	17th	—	—	—		
Pte	Charles Romain	England	U	Croydon Common	17th	—	—	—		
Pte	Peter Roney	Scotland	GK	Bristol Rovers	17th	—	—	—	(Note: Transferred to the Machine Gun Corps in December 1916.)	
Pte	Ralph Routledge	England	n/a	Brighton & Hove Albion	17th	—	—	—	(Note: Discharged on 18 August 1916.)	
Pte	Ernest Russ	n/a	n/a	Chelsea	17th	—	—	—		
Pte	George Scott	England	CH	Clapton Orient	17th	16 August 1916 (aged 30)	Nord, France	—	(Note: Taken prisoner of war.)	
Pte	Angus Seed	England	RB	Leicester Fosse	17th	—	—	MM		
Pte	Jackie Sheldon	England	OR	Liverpool	17th	—	—	—		
Pte	**Ernie Simms**	England	CF	Luton Town	17th, 23rd	—	—	—		
Pte	Cyril Smith	Wales	IL	Croydon Common	17th	—	—	—	(Note: Later transferred to the Royal Army Medical Corps.)	
Pte	Frank Spencer	n/a	FB	Brighton & Hove Albion	17th	—	—	—		
Pte	John Stephenson	n/a	GK	Cardiff City	17th	—	—	—		
Pte	William Stephenson	England	RB	Wingate Albion	17th	—	—	—		
Pte	Alexander Stewart	Scotland	FB	Watford	17th	—	—	—	(Note: Medically discharged on 29 December 1916.)	
Pte	Percy Summers	England	GK	Grimsby Town	17th	—	—	—		
Pte	Frank Taylor	n/a	n/a	Northampton Town	17th	—	—	—		
Pte	Arthur Tilley	England	OR	Clapton Orient	17th, 23rd	—	—	—		
Pte	Albert Tomkins	England	HB/IF	Croydon Common	17th	—	—	—	(Note: Transferred to the Labour Corps in August 1918.)	
Pte	Alfred Tyler	England	OL	Brighton & Hove Albion	17th	—	—	—		
Pte	Dick Upex	England	IL	Croydon Common	17th	—	—	—		
Pte	Joe Webster	England	GK	West Ham United	17th	—	—	—		
Pte	Alf West	England	FB	Notts County	17th	—	—	—		
Pte	Bob Whiting	England	GK	Brighton & Hove Albion	17th	28 April 1917 (aged 34)	Oppy Wood, France	—	(Note: Whiting attained the rank of lance sergeant prior to being demoted to private in December 1916 after a court-martial. He was serving as a private at the time of his death.)	
Pte	Fred Whittaker	England	FW	Millwall Athletic	17th	—	—	—		
Pte	George Whitworth	England	CF	Northampton Town	17th	—	—	—		
Pte	Arthur Wileman	England	IR	Luton Town	17th	28 April 1918 (aged 31–32)	West Flanders, Belgium	MM		
Pte	**James Williams**	Wales	FW	Millwall Athletic	17th	5 June 1916 (aged 32)	Pas-de-Calais, France	—		
n/a	Skilly Williams	England	GK	Watford	17th	—	—	—		
Pte	**Ernest Williamson**	England	GK	Croydon Common	17th	—	—	—		
Pte	T. T. Wilson	n/a	HB	Luton Town	17th	—	—	—		
Pte	Jack Woodhouse	England	HB	Brighton & Hove Albion	17th	—	—	—		

== See also ==
- Association football during World War I
- McCrae's Battalion, the 16th (Service) Battalion of the Royal Scots
