= 1914–15 Queens Park Rangers F.C. season =

English football club season

Queens Park Rangers
1914–15 season
- Chairman: J. H. Fielding
- Manager: James Howie
- Stadium: New Park Royal , Kensal Rise (from Feb 1915)
- Southern League Division One 1914/15: 12th
- FA Cup: Round 3
- London Challenge Cup: Round 2
- Top goalscorer: League: John Miller 17; All: John Miller 18
- Highest home attendance: 7,000 (2 April 1915) Vs Croydon Common , (10 April 1915) vs Swindon
- Lowest home attendance: 3,000 (26 December 1914) vs Bristol,(27 March 1915) vs Luton
- Biggest win: 3–0 (27 February 1915) vs Gillingham,(13 March 1915) vs Cardiff
- Biggest defeat: 2–5 (18 March 1915) vs Watford
Home colours	Away colours

The 1914–15 Queens Park Rangers season was the club's 27th season of existence and their 16th and final season in the Southern League Division One, the top non-league division of football in England at the time. QPR finished 12th in the Southern League Division One 1914/15. They lost to Everton F.C. in the round of 16 of the FA Cup.

== League table ==
=== Southern League Division One 1914/15 ===
Pos	Club	P	W	D	L	F	A	GA	Pts
8	Millwall	38	16	10	12	50	51	0.98	42
9	Swindon Town	38	15	11	12	77	59	1.305	41
10	Brighton & Hove Albion	38	16	7	15	46	47	0.979	39
11	Exeter City	38	15	8	15	50	41	1.22	38
12	QPR	38	13	12	13	55	56	0.982	38

=== Results ===
QPR scores given first

Win Draw Loss

=== Southern League Division One 1914/15 ===
Date	Venue	Opponent	Result	Score F–A	Scorers	Attendance	League Position
1 September 1914	A	Millwall	L	1–3	Miller	6,000	13
5 September 1914	H	Reading	L	0–1		4,000	19
12 September 1914	A	Southampton	L	0–3		3,000	20
16 September 1914	A	Luton	W	4–2	Birch 2, Donald, Miller	4,000	18
19 September 1914	H	Northampton	D	0–0		5,000	18
26 September 1914	A	Watford	D	2–2	Birch, Whyman	5,000	17
3 October 1914	H	Plymouth	D	1–1	Miller	6,000	16
10 October 1914	A	West Ham	D	2–2	Baldock 2	7,000	16
17 October 1914	H	Norwich	D	1–1	Baldock	6,000	16
24 October 1914	A	Gillingham	W	1–0	Thompson	7,000	12
31 October 1914	H	Brighton	L	0–1		5,000	14
7 November 1914	A	Cardiff	L	0–2		10,000	17
14 November 1914	H	Exeter	L	0–2		4,000	18
28 November 1914	H	Portsmouth	L	1–2	Thompson	4,000	19
5 December 1914	A	Swindon	W	2–1	Simons, Birch	1,000	18
12 December 1914	H	Southend	W	4–2	Miller, Broster, Simons, Donald	4,000	17
19 December 1914	A	Crystal P	D	2–2	Simons, Gregory	3,000	15
25 December 1914	A	Bristol R	W	3–1	Miller, Birch 2	8,000	14
26 December 1914	H	Bristol R	W	2–1	Miller, Simons	3,000	12
28 December 1914	H	Millwall	L	0–1		6,000	13
2 January 1915	A	Reading	D	2–2	Miller 2	5,000	13
16 January 1915	H	Southampton	W	4–3	Miller 2, Simons, Birch	4,000	11
23 January 1915	A	Northampton	D	1–1	Miller	5,000	11
6 February 1915	A	Plymouth	D	1–1	Birch	3,000	12
13 February 1915	H	West Ham	D	1–1	Birch	5,000	12
27 February 1915	H	Gillingham	W	3–0	Miller 2, Donald	5,000	12
6 March 1915	A	Brighton	L	0–1		4,000	12
13 March 1915	H	Cardiff	W	3–0	Miller 2, Gregory	4,000	12
18 March 1915	H	Watford	L	2–5	Miller, Birch	5,000	12
20 March 1915	A	Exeter	W	1–0	Birch	3,000	12
25 March 1915	A	Norwich	L	1–2	Donald	3,000	12
27 March 1915	H	Luton	L	0–3		3,000	12
2 April 1915	H	Croydon Common	W	1–0	Baldock	7,000	12
3 April 1915	A	Portsmouth	D	1–1	Birch	6,000	12
5 April 1915	A	Croydon Common	L	0–1		6,000	12
10 April 1915	H	Swindon	W	4–2	Baldock, Miller, Thompson, Birch	7,000	11
17 April 1915	A	Southend	D	1–1	Whyman	2,000	12
24 April 1915	H	Crystal P	W	3–2	Simons 2, Donald	5,000	12

=== London Challenge Cup ===
Round	Date	Venue	Opponent	Result	Score F–A	Scorers	Attendance
First round	21 September 1914	H	Chelsea	W	1–0	Whyman	1,000
Second round	19 October 1914	A	Woolwich Arsenal	L	1–2	Broster	4,000

=== Southern Professional Charity Cup ===
Round	Date	Venue	Opponent	Result	Score F–A	Scorers	Attendance
First round	8 October 1914	H	Brentford	W	4–0	Thompson, Miller, Baldock, Donald	1,000
Second round			Norwich	withdrew			

=== London Professional Charity Fund ===
Date	Venue	Opponent	Result	Score F–A	Scorers	Attendance
28 September 1914	A	Fulham	L	0–2		

=== FA Cup ===
Round	Date	Venue	Opponent	Result	Score F–A	Scorers	Attendance
Sixth qualifying round	19 December 1914			BYE			
First round	9 January 1915	H	Glossop (Second Division)	W	2–1	Birch, Miller	7,000
Second round	30 January 1915	H	Leeds City (Second Division)	W	1–0	Simons	10,000
Third round	20 February 1915	Stamford Bridge	Everton (First Division)	L	1–2	Broster	33,000

== Squad ==
Position	Nationality	Name	Southern League Appearances	Southern League Goals	FA Cup Appearances	FA Cup Goals
GK	(England)	Jack Durston				
GK	(England)	F.W Matthews				
GK	(England)	Harry Jefferies				
GK	(England)	Bob McLeod	38		3	
DF	(England)	Basil Loney	1			
DF	(England)	Billy Draper				
DF	(England)	Joe Wingrove	4			
DF	(England)	Harry Pullen	35		3	
DF	(England)	Joseph Wilde	6			
DF	(England)	Tom Millington	27		3	
DF	(England)	Dan Higgins	9			
DF	(England)	Gilbert Ovens	14			
MF	(England)	John Pennifer				
MF	(England)	Jack Gregory	13	2		
MF	(England)	Archie Mitchell	31		3	
MF	(England)	John Baldock	11	5		
MF	(England)	Jack Broster	26	1	3	1
MF	(England)	Alf Whyman	23	2	3	
MF	(England)	George Fox				
MF	(England)	Bill Wake	15			
MF	(England)	Edward McKinney	2			
FW	(England)	David Donald	35	5	3	
FW	(England)	Jimmy Birch	38	13	3	1
FW	(England)	Billy Thompson	34	3	3	
FW	(England)	Tommy Simons	18	7	3	1
FW	(England)	Ben Ives	5			
FW	(England)	Freddie Blake				
FW	(England)	John Miller	33	17	3	1

== Transfers in ==
Name	from	Date	Fee
Archie Mitchell	Aston Villa	2 May 1907	
Bill Wake	Exeter	1 May 1909	
Jimmy Birch	Aston Villa	2 May 1912	£150
Alf Whyman	New Brompton	4 May 1909	
Harry Pullen	Kettering Town	4 May 1910	
Jack Broster	Chorley	6 July 1912	
Billy Thompson	Haslingden	23 July 1912	
Jack Gregory	Willenhall Swifts	25 July 1912	
Joseph Wilde	Burnley	20 August 1912	
Joe Wingrove	Uxbridge	Mar1913	
Ben Ives	Exeter	1 April 1913	£300
Billy Draper		cs1913	
Read, Albert *	Uxbridge	cs1913	
John Baldock	Luton Vandale	Nov1913	
David Donald	Watford	16 May 1914	
Matthews, F W *	Hampstead Town	cs1913	
John Miller	Vale of Leven	5 May 1913	
Edward McKinney	Broom Athletic	16 May 1914	
Amstad, Jonas		June1914	
Dan Higgins	Kingston-on-Thames	Jan1913	
Butler, Albert (Ben)	Hartlepools U	1 Sep 1913	
Read, Albert *	Uxbridge	cs1913	
John Pennifer	Hampstead Town	July1913	
Freddie Blake	Ilford	Jan1914	
Bob McLeod	Newport	4 May 1914	
Weblin, Francis *	West Norwood	cs1912	
Gilbert Ovens	Chelsea	17 July 1911	Free
Read, Albert *	Uxbridge	cs1913	
Nicholls, Alfred	Aston Villa	23 July 1907	
Harry Jefferies	Aberdare	30 June 1913	
Saunders, John		cs1913	
Weblin, Francis *	West Norwood	cs1912	
Cater, William	Kilburn	cs1913	
Butler, Albert (Ben)	Hartlepools U	1 Sep 1913	
Lilliott, Frank		Mar1914	
Wilson, Thomas *	Clapton	18 July 1910	
Strugnell, Herbert	Aston Villa	22 May 1913	
Ingham, James	Haslingden	16 June 1913	
Read, Albert *	Uxbridge	cs1913	
Brightwell, W		Mar1914	
Poplett, John *	Shepherd's Bush	May1914	
Thornton, Harry *	Shepherd's Bush	July1911	
Birch, Jimmy	Aston Villa	2 May 1912	£150
Miller, John	Vale of Leven	5 May 1913	
Fortune, Jimmy	Barrow	6 May 1913	
Thompson, Andy	Gateshead	3 June 1913	
Lockwood, James *	Ipswich Town	cs1913	
Stephenson, James	Luton	6 Sep 1913	
Browning, Bob	Brentford	May1914	
Amstad, Jonas		June1914	
Bowler, George	Tottenham	cs1914	
Downing, Alfred		cs1914	
Nitschke, William *	Kilburn	cs1914	
Cannell, Alfred		July1914	
Tom Millington	Bury	14 July 1914	
Payne, Arthur	Old Crusaders	Aug1914	
Jack Durston	Clophill	31 August 1914	
Marchant, George	Tufnell Park	Sep1914	
Gray, William		Sep1914	
Heaven, Harold		Sep1914	
Nesbitt, C		Oct1914	
Thompson, Andy		22 Oct 1914	
Brooks, George		6 Nov 1914	
Radnage, Joe *	Oxford City	Nov1914	Loan
Tommy Simons	Fulham	13 November 1914	
Basil Loney	Stockton	Jan1915	
George Fox	Hampstead Town	Mar1915	
Keech, George *		Apr1915	

== Transfers out ==
Name	from	Date	Fee	Date	To	Fee
Lockwood, James *	Ipswich Town	cs1913		Apr 1914	Ipswich Town	
Strugnell, Herbert	Aston Villa	22 May 1913		May 1914	Hartlepools U	£125
Fortune, Jimmy	Barrow	6 May 1913		May 1914	Bristol R	£100
Thompson, Andy	Gateshead	3 June 1913		May 1914		
Stephenson, James	Luton	6 Sep 1913		cs 1914	Bedlington United	
Harry Jefferies	Aberdare	30 June 1913		cs 1914		
Saunders, John		cs1913		cs 1914		
Cater, William	Kilburn	cs1913		cs 1914		
Lilliott, Frank		Mar1914		cs 1914		
Wilson, Thomas *	Clapton	18 July 1910		cs 1914		
Ingham, James	Haslingden	16 June 1913		cs 1914		
Brightwell, W		Mar1914		cs 1914		
Thornton, Harry *	Shepherd's Bush	July1911		cs 1914		
Nicholls, Alfred	Aston Villa	23 July 1907		Sep 1914	Atherstone Town	£100
Poplett, John *	Shepherd's Bush	May1914		Sep 1914	The Army	
Bowler, George	Tottenham	cs1914		Sep 1914	Tottenham	
Browning, Bob	Brentford	May1914		Sep 1914	The Army	
Gray, William		Sep1914		Oct 1914	Southall	
Heaven, Harold		Sep1914		Oct 1914		
Marchant, George	Tufnell Park	Sep1914		Nov 1914	Tufnell Park	
Nesbitt, C		Oct1914		Nov 1914		
Radnage, Joe *	Oxford City	Nov1914	Loan	Nov 1914	Oxford City	Loan
Thompson, Andy		22 Oct 1914		Nov 1914		
Brooks, George		6 Nov 1914		Mar 1915		
Bob McLeod	Newport	4 May 1914		cs 1915	Clyde	
Weblin, Francis *	West Norwood	cs1912		cs 1915		
Nitschke, William *	Kilburn	cs1914		cs 1915		
Gilbert Ovens	Chelsea	17 July 1911	Free	cs 1915		
Downing, Alfred		cs1914		cs 1915		
Amstad, Jonas		June1914		cs 1915		
Cannell, Alfred		July1914		cs 1915		
Keech, George *		Apr1915		cs 1915		
