= Dick Upex =

English footballer

Personal information
- Full name: Richard Upex
- Date of birth: 26 June 1892
- Place of birth: New Fletton, England
- Date of death: 22 May 1979 (aged 86)
- Place of death: Croydon, England
- Position: Inside left

Senior career*
Years	Team	Apps	(Gls)
1912	Great Eastern Locomotive Works		
1912	Peterborough City		
1912–1916	Croydon Common	22	(11)
1916–1917	Clapton Orient		
1919	Tottenham Hotspur	0	(0)
1919–1920	Southend United	17	(6)
1920–1922	Charlton Athletic	19	(6)
- * Club domestic league appearances and goals

Richard Upex (26 June 1892 – 22 May 1979) was an English professional footballer who played in the Football League for Charlton Athletic as an inside left. He also played Southern League football for Croydon Common and Southend United.

== Personal life ==
Upex worked as a sugar boiler in the confectionery trade. He served as a private with the Football Battalion of the Middlesex Regiment during the First World War and saw action at High Wood, Vimy Ridge, Loos, Cambrai and Lens. He also served in the Labour Corps. In 1937, Upex was working as a commission agent and during the 1950s he ran a turf accountancy business.

== Career statistics ==
Appearances and goals by club, season and competition
Club	Season	League			FA Cup		Total	
Club	Season	Division	Apps	Goals	Apps	Goals	Apps	Goals
Croydon Common	1912–13	Southern League Second Division	13	8	5	3	18	11
Croydon Common	1913–14	Southern League Second Division	3	1	0	0	3	1
Croydon Common	1914–15	Southern League First Division	6	2	1	0	7	2
Croydon Common	Total		22	11	6	3	28	14
Southend United	1919–20	Southern League First Division	17	6	0	0	17	6
Charlton Athletic	1920–21	Southern League English Section	16	6	5	4	21	10
Charlton Athletic	1921–22	Third Division South	3	0	0	0	3	0
Charlton Athletic	Total		19	6	5	4	24	10
Career total			58	23	11	7	69	30
