= Cyril Smith (footballer) =

Welsh footballer

Personal information
- Full name: Cyril C. Smith
- Date of birth: 1893
- Place of birth: Knighton, Wales
- Position: Inside left

Senior career*
Years	Team	Apps	(Gls)
- Aberdare Thursday
- Newtown
1912–1913	Royal Welch Fusiliers		
1913–1914	Aberdare		
1914–1916	Croydon Common	17	(5)
1919–1920	Crystal Palace	7	(0)
1920–1923	Charlton Athletic	7	(0)
1923–1924	Guildford United	18	(6)
1924–1925	Nuneaton Town		
- * Club domestic league appearances and goals

Cyril C. Smith was a Welsh professional footballer who played as an inside left in the Football League for Charlton Athletic.

== Personal life ==
Smith served in the Royal Welch Fusiliers until 1913 and served as a private in the Middlesex Regiment's 1st Football Battalion during the early years of the First World War. He was gassed at Delville Wood during the Battle of the Somme and was evacuated to a hospital in Liverpool. Smith ended the war as a private in the Royal Army Medical Corps.

== Career statistics ==
Appearances and goals by club, season and competition
Club	Season	League			FA Cup		Total	
Club	Season	Division	Apps	Goals	Apps	Goals	Apps	Goals
Croydon Common	1914–15	Southern League First Division	17	5	0	0	17	5
Crystal Palace	1919–20	Southern League First Division	7	0	0	0	7	0
Charlton Athletic	1920–21	Southern League English Section	21	6	5	3	26	9
Charlton Athletic	1921–22	Third Division South	7	0	0	0	7	0
Charlton Athletic	Total		28	6	5	3	33	9
Guildford United	1923–24	Southern League Eastern Division	18	6	4	1	22	7
Career total			70	17	9	4	79	21
