= Sam Davis (footballer) =

English footballer

Personal information
- Full name: Samuel George Davis
- Date of birth: 1890
- Place of birth: Plymouth, England
- Position: Right back

Senior career*
Years	Team	Apps	(Gls)
- Oreston Rovers
1913–1920	Plymouth Argyle	4	(1)
1915	→ Gillingham (guest)		
1920	Newport County	13	(0)
- Torquay United
- * Club domestic league appearances and goals

Samuel George Davis MM (born 1890; date of death unknown) was an English professional footballer who played in the Football League for Newport County as a right back.

== Personal life ==
Davis enlisted as a private in the Football Battalion of the Middlesex Regiment during the First World War and spent time attached to a Light Trench Mortar Battery. He was commissioned into the Duke of Cornwall's Light Infantry in October 1917 and ended the war with the rank of captain. He won the Military Medal during the course of his service.

== Career statistics ==
Appearances and goals by club, season and competition
Club	Season	League			FA Cup		Total	
Club	Season	Division	Apps	Goals	Apps	Goals	Apps	Goals
Plymouth Argyle	1914–15	Southern League First Division	2	1	0	0	2	1
Plymouth Argyle	1919–20	Southern League First Division	2	0	0	0	2	0
Career total			4	1	0	0	4	1
