= George Scott (footballer, born 1885) =

English footballer (1885–1916)

Personal information
- Date of birth: 29 September 1885
- Place of birth: Sunderland, England
- Date of death: 16 August 1916 (aged 30)
- Place of death: Saint-Quentin, Aisne, France
- Height: 5 ft 9 1/2 in (1.77 m)
- Positions: Midfielder; centre-half

Senior career*
Years	Team	Apps	(Gls)
- Braeside
?–1908	Sunderland West End		
1908–1915	Clapton Orient	205	(33)
- * Club domestic league appearances and goals

George Scott (29 September 1885 – 16 August 1916) was an English footballer.

Scott started his football career with Sunderland District Amateur League sides Braeside and Sunderland West End, before joining Clapton Orient in July 1908. He featured regularly throughout the next seven seasons, playing in various positions and scoring an average of five goals per season in all competitions. His most valuable goals included the only goal of the game in Orient's victory over Tottenham Hotspur at White Hart Lane on 9 April 1909. In 1911, Scott was selected for a London XI to face a Paris XI in France.

At the outbreak of World War I professional football was suspended, and Scott joined the 17th Middlesex Regiment, the "Footballers' Battalion", along with many other Orient players and staff. During the Battle of the Somme, Scott was wounded and taken prisoner, and died at a German military hospital on 16 August 1916. Scott was one of three Orient players killed in the war, along with William Jonas and Richard McFadden. He is buried at St. Souplet British Cemetery, a few miles south of Le Cateau.
