= John Dunn (footballer, born 1888) =

English footballer

Personal information
- Full name: John Henry Dunn
- Date of birth: November 1888
- Place of birth: Eccles, England
- Date of death: 1968 (aged 79–80)
- Height: 5 ft 10 1/2 in (1.79 m)
- Position: Inside right

Senior career*
Years	Team	Apps	(Gls)
- Eccles Borough
1913–1914	Leeds City	0	(0)
1914–1920	Luton Town	62	(0)
1915	→ Leeds City (guest)	1	(0)
1916–1917	→ Everton (guest)	4	(0)
- → Blackpool (guest)
1920–1921	The Wednesday	8	(0)
- * Club domestic league appearances and goals

John Henry Dunn (November 1888 – 1968) was an English professional footballer who played as a full back in the Football League for The Wednesday.

== Personal life ==
On 16 November 1914, four months since Britain's entry into the First World War, Dunn enlisted in the Football Battalion of the Middlesex Regiment. In November 1915, he was transferred to the regiment's 27th (Depot) Battalion and was released from the army in March 1916 to work in a munitions factory in Liverpool.

== Career statistics ==
Appearances and goals by club, season and competition
Club	Season	League			FA Cup		Total	
Club	Season	Division	Apps	Goals	Apps	Goals	Apps	Goals
Luton Town	1914–15	Southern League First Division	24	0	4	0	28	0
Luton Town	1919–20	Southern League First Division	38	0	4	0	42	0
Luton Town	Total		62	0	8	0	70	0
The Wednesday	1920–21	Second Division	8	0	0	0	8	0
Career total			70	0	8	0	78	0

== Honours ==
Eccles Borough

- Lancashire Combination First Division: 1912–13
