= Arthur Roe (footballer) =

English footballer

Personal information
- Full name: Arthur Roe
- Date of birth: 1892
- Place of birth: South Normanton, England
- Date of death: 1960 (aged 67–68)
- Positions: Half back; inside forward

Senior career*
Years	Team	Apps	(Gls)
–1914	South Normanton		
1914–1925	Luton Town	132	(3)
- → Luton Clarence (loan)
1925	Arsenal	1	(0)
1925–1927	Bournemouth & Boscombe Athletic	50	(2)
- Mansfield Town
- * Club domestic league appearances and goals

Arthur Roe (1892–1960) was an English professional footballer who played in the Football League for Luton Town, Bournemouth & Boscombe Athletic and Arsenal as a half back.

== Personal life ==
Four months after the outbreak of the First World War, Roe enlisted in the Football Battalion of the Middlesex Regiment on 16 December 1914.

== Career statistics ==
Appearances and goals by club, season and competition
Club	Season	League			FA Cup		Total	
Club	Season	Division	Apps	Goals	Apps	Goals	Apps	Goals
Luton Town	1914–15	Southern League First Division	14	2	0	0	14	2
Luton Town	1919–20	Southern League First Division	25	0	2	0	27	0
Luton Town	1920–21	Third Division	11	0	0	0	11	0
Luton Town	1921–22	Third Division South	35	0	3	0	38	0
Luton Town	1922–23	Third Division South	30	0	1	0	31	0
Luton Town	1923–24	Third Division South	11	0	0	0	11	0
Luton Town	1924–25	Third Division South	6	0	0	0	6	0
Luton Town	Total		132	3	6	0	138	3
Arsenal	1924–25	First Division	1	0	―		1	0
Career total			133	3	6	0	139	0
