= Percy Summers =

English footballer

Personal information
- Full name: Percy Summers
- Date of birth: 27 September 1889
- Place of birth: Sheffield, England
- Date of death: 21 June 1966 (aged 76)
- Place of death: Derby, England
- Position: Goalkeeper

Senior career*
| Years | Team | Apps | (Gls) |
- Wales
| 1910–1914 | Chesterfield Town | 127 | (0) |
| 1914–1915 | Grimsby Town | 34 | (0) |
| 1919–1920 | Luton Town | 32 | (0) |
- Margate
- * Club domestic league appearances and goals

Percy Summers (27 September 1889 – 21 January 1966) was an English professional footballer who played as a goalkeeper in the Football League for Grimsby Town. He notably made over 130 Midland League appearances for Chesterfield Town.

== Personal life ==
Prior to becoming a professional footballer, Summers worked as a mechanic in a coal mine near Rhondda. Summers served as a private in the Football Battalion of the Middlesex Regiment during the First World War. In 1916, he received hand and stomach wounds during the Battle of the Somme and was medically discharged from the army.

== Career statistics ==
Appearances and goals by club, season and competition
| Club | Season | League | | | FA Cup | | Total | |
| Club | Season | Division | Apps | Goals | Apps | Goals | Apps | Goals |
|---|---|---|---|---|---|---|---|---|
| Chesterfield Town | 1910–11 | Midland League | 26 | 0 | 4 | 0 | 30 | 0 |
| Chesterfield Town | 1911–12 | Midland League | 35 | 0 | 0 | 0 | 35 | 0 |
| Chesterfield Town | 1912–13 | Midland League | 35 | 0 | 0 | 0 | 3 | 0 |
| Chesterfield Town | 1913–14 | Midland League | 31 | 0 | 3 | 0 | 34 | 0 |
| Chesterfield Town | Total | | 127 | 0 | 7 | 0 | 134 | 0 |
| Grimsby Town | 1914–15 | Second Division | 34 | 0 | 1 | 0 | 35 | 0 |
| Luton Town | 1919–20 | Southern League First Division | 32 | 0 | 2 | 0 | 34 | 0 |
| Career Total | | | 193 | 0 | 10 | 0 | 203 | 0 |
