= Ben Butler (footballer) =

English footballer

Personal information
- Full name: Albert Victor Butler
- Place of birth: Reading, England
- Date of death: 13 May 1916 (aged 29)
- Place of death: Bruay-la-Buissière, France
- Height: 5 ft 9 in (1.75 m)
- Position: Centre half

Youth career
- –1908: Woolwich Arsenal

Senior career*
Years	Team	Apps	(Gls)
1908–1912	Reading		
1912–1913	Hartlepools United	25	(1)
1913–1916	Queens Park Rangers	0	(0)
- * Club domestic league appearances and goals

Albert Victor "Ben" Butler (died 13 May 1916) was an English professional footballer who played as a centre half in the Southern League for Reading.

== Personal life ==
Butler supplemented his football income by working as an engine cleaner for the South East Railway Company. During the First World War, he served as a corporal in the 1st Football Battalion of the Middlesex Regiment. On 3 May 1916, Butler was wounded in the right leg by a shell during urban combat in Liévin, France. The leg was subsequently amputated and he died as a result 10 days later at No.22 Casualty Clearing Station in Bruay-la-Buissière. Butler left a widow, Kate and two sons and was buried in Bruay Communal Cemetery Extension. Butler's will, in which he left everything to Kate, survives and is in the archives of Her Majesty's Courts and Tribunals Service.

== Career statistics ==
Appearances and goals by club, season and competition
Club	Season	League			FA Cup		Other		Total	
Club	Season	Division	Apps	Goals	Apps	Goals	Apps	Goals	Apps	Goals
Hartlepools United	1912–13	North Eastern League	25	1	1	0	—		26	1
Queens Park Rangers	1913–14	Southern League First Division	0	0	0	0	1 (Note: Appearance in London Challenge Cup)	0	1	0
Queens Park Rangers	1914–15	Southern League First Division	0	0	0	0	1	0	1	0
Queens Park Rangers	Total		0	0	0	0	2	0	2	0
Career total			25	1	1	0	2	0	28	1

== Honours ==
Reading

- Southern League Second Division: 1910–11
