= James McCormick =

James, Jim or Jimmy McCormick may refer to:

- James Hanna McCormick (1875–1955), Northern Ireland politician
- James Robinson McCormick (1824–1897), U.S. Representative from Missouri
- James McCormick (Irish republican) (1910–1940)
- Jim McCormick (American football) (1884–1959), American football player
- Jim McCormick (author) (born 1956), American speaker, author and skydiver
- Jim McCormick (infielder) (1868–1948), American baseball player
- Jim McCormick (pitcher) (1856–1918), right-handed pitcher in Major League Baseball
- Jim McCormick (rugby union) (1923–2006), New Zealand rugby union player
- Jim McCormick (songwriter), American songwriter
- Jim McCormick, head of the company that manufactured the ADE 651, a fake bomb detector
- Jimmy McCormick (1912–1968), English football player and manager
- Jimmy McCormick (footballer, born 1883) (1883–1935), English football player
