= Hugh Gallacher =

Hugh Gallacher may refer to:

- Hughie Gallacher (1903–1957), Scottish footballer
- Hugh Gallacher (footballer, born 1870) (1870–1941), Scottish footballer
- Hugh Gallacher (footballer, born 1891) (1891–1920), Scottish football left half
- Hugh Gallacher (footballer, born 1930) (1930–2013), Scottish footballer
