= Jack Dodds =

English footballer

Personal information
- Full name: John Thirlwell Dodds
- Date of birth: 1885
- Place of birth: Hexham, England
- Date of death: 1940 (aged 54–55)
- Positions: Outside forward; inside right

Senior career*
Years	Team	Apps	(Gls)
- Northern Star
1905–1906	Newcastle United	5	(0)
1908	Oldham Athletic	8	(0)
–1911	Darlington		
1911–1913	Merthyr Town		
1913–1914	Barrow		
1914–	Stalybridge Celtic		
1918	→ Heart of Midlothian (guest)	0	(0)
- * Club domestic league appearances and goals

John Thirlwell Dodds (1885–1940) was an English professional footballer who played as a forward in the Football League for Oldham Athletic and Newcastle United.

== Personal life ==
Dodds enlisted as a private in the Football Battalion of the Middlesex Regiment during the First World War. He later served in the Labour Corps.

== Career statistics ==
Appearances and goals by club, season and competition
Club	Season	League			FA Cup		Total	
Club	Season	Division	Apps	Goals	Apps	Goals	Apps	Goals
Newcastle United	1905–06	First Division	1	0	0	0	1	0
Newcastle United	1906–07	First Division	4	0	0	0	4	0
Career total			5	0	0	0	5	0

== Honours ==
Merthyr Town

- Southern League Second Division: 1911–12
- South Wales Cup: 1911–12
