= Sidney Wheelhouse =

English footballer

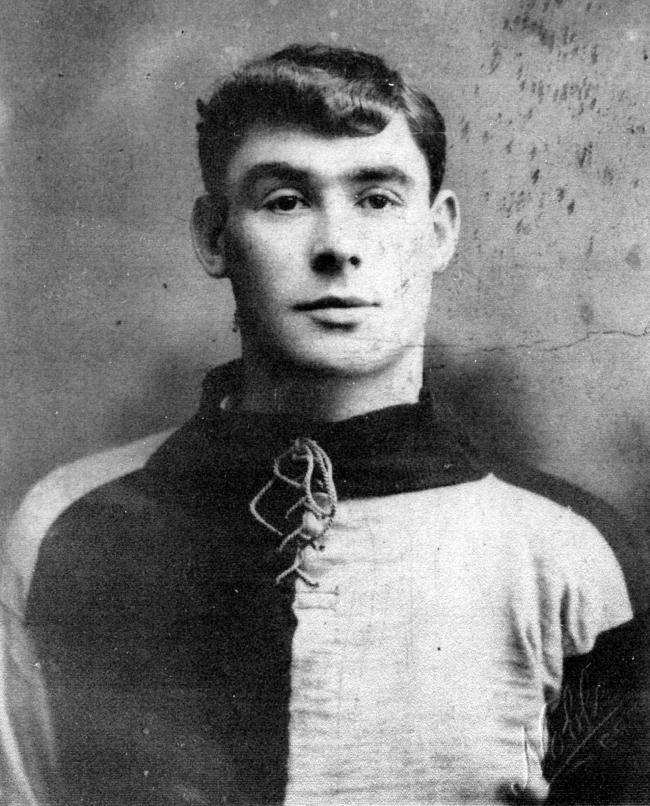
- Wheelhouse in 1907

Personal information
- Date of birth: September 1888
- Place of birth: Darlington, England
- Date of death: 19 September 1916 (aged 27–28)
- Place of death: near Beaumont-Hamel, France
- Height: 5 ft 11 in (1.80 m)
- Position(s): Right back

Senior career*
Years	Team	Apps	(Gls)
1905	Bishop Auckland		
1906–1907	Shildon Athletic		
1907–1915	Grimsby Town	234	(2)
- * Club domestic league appearances and goals

Sidney Wheelhouse (September 1888 – 19 September 1916) was an English professional football right back, best remembered for his eight years in the Football League with Grimsby Town.

== Career ==
A right back, Wheelhouse began his career with Northern League clubs Bishop Auckland and Shildon Athletic before moving to the Football League to sign for Second Division club Grimsby Town in 1907. He was a regular with the Mariners for the next eight seasons and went on to captain the club, before leaving at the end of 1914–15. He returned to Blundell Park in 1916 to play in a wartime charity match.

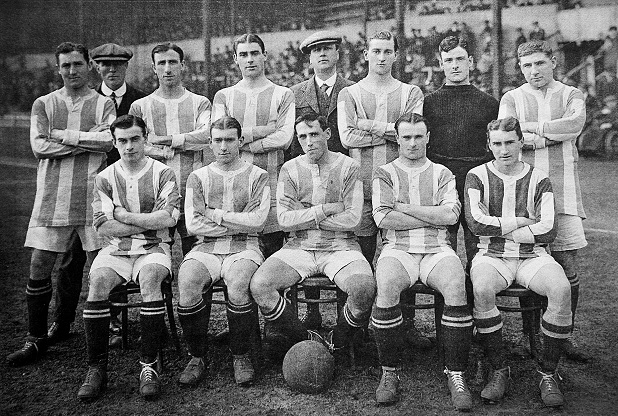
Grimsby Town F.C. 1914–1915. BACK: David Kenny, Holden (Trainer), William Andrews, Sidney Wheelhouse, Willis Rippon, Alfred Lee, Percy Summers, Francis Martin. FRONT: Thomas Spink, Thomas Rippon, George Rampton, Thomas Mayson, Ralph Thompson.

== Personal life ==
He fought with the 17th (Service) Battalion of the Duke of Cambridge's Own (Middlesex Regiment) (more popularly known as the 1st Football Battalion) during the First World War and rose to the rank of lance corporal. He saw action at Delville Wood and Guillemont in July and August 1916.

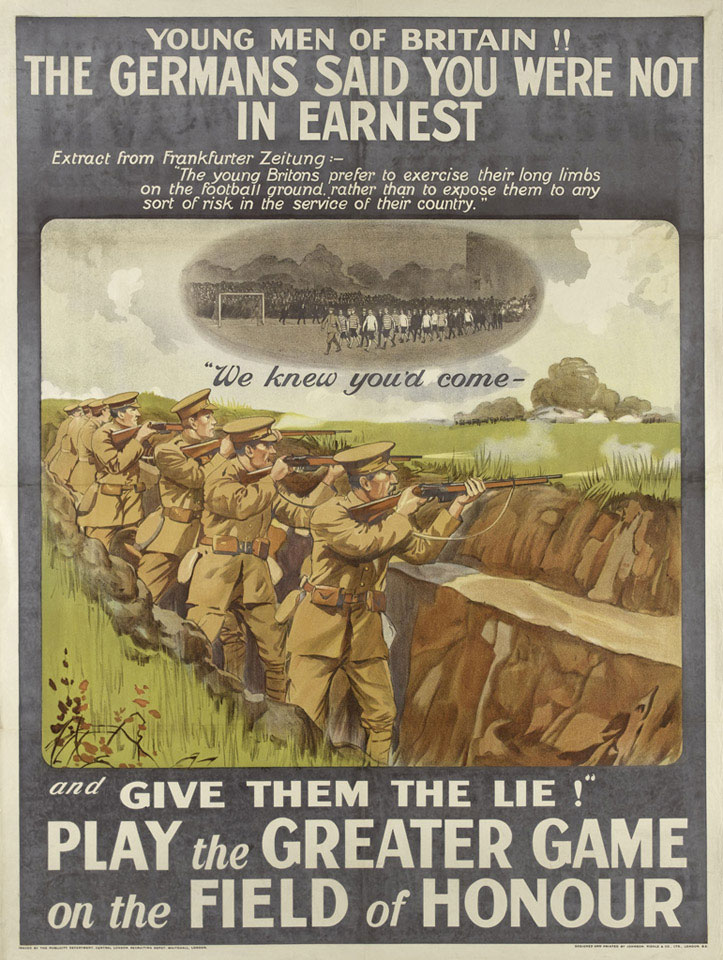
17th (Service) Battalion Recruitment Poster

On 18 September, Wheelhouse was part of a working party which was mined while sheltering from a mortar attack and within 24 hours, he and every member of the party was dead. He is buried in Couin British Cemetery.

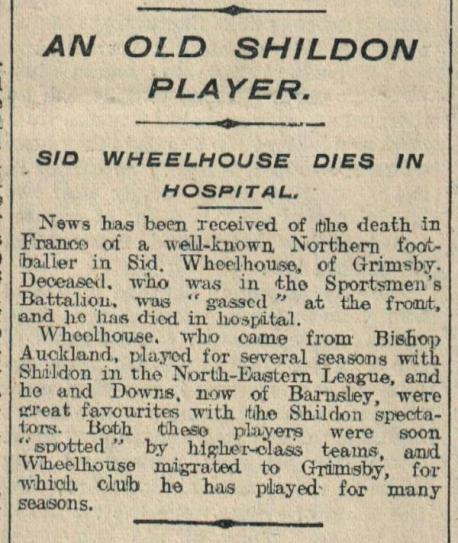
Sidney's Obituary, 27 September 1916

== Career statistics ==
Club	Season	League			FA Cup		Total	
Club	Season	Division	Apps	Goals	Apps	Goals	Apps	Goals
Grimsby Town	1907–08	Second Division	30	0	5	0	35	0
Grimsby Town	1908–09	Second Division	38	0	1	0	39	0
Grimsby Town	1909–10	Second Division	37	0	1	0	38	0
Grimsby Town	1910–11	Midland League						
Grimsby Town	1911–12	Second Division	32	1	1	0	33	1
Grimsby Town	1912–13	Second Division	37	1	1	0	38	1
Grimsby Town	1913–14	Second Division	36	0	1	0	37	0
Grimsby Town	1914–15	Second Division	24	0	1	0	25	0
Total			234	2	11	0	245	2
