= Robert Frith =

English footballer

Personal information
- Full name: Robert William Frith
- Date of birth: 1892
- Place of birth: Hassop, England
- Date of death: 1939 (aged 46–47)
- Height: 5 ft 11 in (1.80 m)
- Position: Half back

Senior career*
Years	Team	Apps	(Gls)
1908	Bradford Park Avenue		
1909	Sheffield United	0	(0)
1911	Derby County	1	(0)
1913–1915	Luton Town	59	(0)
1919	South Shields	19	(1)
1919–1920	Rotherham County	21	(0)
- Mansfield Town
- Mid Rhondda United
1924	Rochdale		

International career
	Western League XI	1	
- * Club domestic league appearances and goals

Robert William Frith (1892–1939) was an English professional footballer who played as a half back in the Football League for Rotherham County, South Shields and Derby County.

== Personal life ==
Frith was married with two children and at one time worked as a furnace man in Sheffield. On 16 December 1914, four months after the outbreak of the First World War, Frith enlisted in the Football Battalion of the Middlesex Regiment. He had two toes amputated in May 1915 and was transferred to the regiment's 27th (Reserve) Battalion in November 1915. Frith was released from the army during the following month to work in a munitions factory in Sheffield. He was posted to the Middlesex Regiment Depot in Aldershot in March 1916 and was discharged from the army in January 1919.

== Career statistics ==
Appearances and goals by club, season and competition
Club	Season	League			FA Cup		Total	
Club	Season	Division	Apps	Goals	Apps	Goals	Apps	Goals
Derby County	1910–11	Second Division	1	0	0	0	1	0
Luton Town	1913–14	Southern League Second Division	30	0	3	0	33	0
Luton Town	1914–15	Southern League First Division	29	0	4	1	33	1
Luton Town	Total		59	0	7	1	66	1
Career total			60	0	7	0	67	1
