= Joe Webster (footballer) =

English footballer

Personal information
- Full name: Joseph Webster
- Date of birth: 1885
- Place of birth: Ilkeston, England
- Date of death: 15 October 1927 (aged 41–42)
- Place of death: Northampton, England
- Position: Goalkeeper

Senior career*
Years	Team	Apps	(Gls)
1907–1910	Ilkeston United		
1910–1914	Watford	131	(0)
1914–1919	West Ham United	19	(0)

International career
	Southern League XI	2	(0)
- * Club domestic league appearances and goals

Joseph Webster (1885 – 15 October 1927) was an English professional footballer who made nearly 150 appearances in the Southern League for Watford as a goalkeeper. He later played in the Football League for West Ham United. After retiring from football, Webster became a trainer, serving Watford and Northampton Town.

== Personal life ==
Webster served in the 1st Football Battalion of the Middlesex Regiment during the First World War and saw action at the Somme, Third Ypres, Vimy Ridge and Cambrai. He died in 1927, following an appendix operation at Northampton General Hospital.

== Career statistics ==
Appearances and goals by club, season and competition
Club	Season	League			FA Cup		Total	
Club	Season	Division	Apps	Goals	Apps	Goals	Apps	Goals
Watford	1910–11	Southern League First Division	34	0	5	0	39	0
Watford	1911–12	Southern League First Division	37	0	6	0	43	0
Watford	1912–13	Southern League First Division	26	0	4	0	30	0
Watford	1913–14	Southern League First Division	34	0	2	0	36	0
Watford	Total		131	0	17	0	148	0
West Ham United	1914–15	Southern League First Division	17	0	0	0	17	0
West Ham United	1919–20	Second Division	2	0	0	0	2	0
West Ham United	Total		19	0	0	0	0	0
Career total			150	0	17	0	167	0
