= Eddie King (footballer, born 1886) =

English footballer

Personal information
- Full name: Edward Burn King
- Date of birth: 5 December 1886
- Place of birth: Blyth, England
- Height: 5 ft 8 in (1.73 m)
- Position: Right half

Senior career*
Years	Team	Apps	(Gls)
–1910	South Shields		
1910–1912	Leyton		
1912–1914	Woolwich Arsenal	11	(0)
1914–1916	Clapton Orient	17	(0)
- * Club domestic league appearances and goals

Edward Burn King (5 December 1886 – after 1913) was an English professional footballer who played as a right half in the Football League for Clapton Orient and Woolwich Arsenal.

== Personal life ==
King served as a private in the Football Battalion, The Queen's (Royal West Surrey Regiment) and the Labour Corps during the First World War. After his retirement from football due to being wounded, he became a miner.

== Career statistics ==
Appearances and goals by club, season and competition
Club	Season	League			FA Cup		Total	
Club	Season	Division	Apps	Goals	Apps	Goals	Apps	Goals
Woolwich Arsenal	1912–13	First Division	11	0	2	0	13	0
Clapton Orient	1914–15	Second Division	17	0	0	0	17	0
Career total			28	0	2	0	30	0
