= Jasper Batey =

English footballer

Personal information
- Full name: Jasper Matthews Batey
- Date of birth: 7 July 1891
- Place of birth: South Shields, England
- Date of death: 23 October 1916 (aged 25)
- Place of death: Pas-de-Calais, France
- Position: Left half

Senior career*
Years	Team	Apps	(Gls)
1912–1913	Portsmouth		(26)
1913–1915	Brighton & Hove Albion	40	(4)
- * Club domestic league appearances and goals

Jasper Matthews Batey (7 July 1891 – 23 October 1916) was an English professional footballer who played for Brighton & Hove Albion in the Southern Football League as a left half.

== Personal life ==
As of 1911, Batey worked as a courier. On 7 January 1915, six months after the outbreak of the First World War, he enlisted in the 17th (Service) Battalion of the Middlesex Regiment as a private. Batey later transferred into the Army Cyclist Corps and was killed in action in Pas-de-Calais on 23 October 1916. He is buried at Cambrin Military Cemetery.

== Career statistics ==
Appearances and goals by club, season and competition
Club	Season	League			FA Cup		Total	
Club	Season	Division	Apps	Goals	Apps	Goals	Apps	Goals
Portsmouth	1912–13	Southern League First Division	—	26	—			26
Crystal Palace	1913–14	Southern League First Division	10	–			10	–
Crystal Palace	1914–15	Southern League First Division	19	1	1	0	20	1
Career total			40	30	0	0	40	30
