= William Jonas =

English footballer (1890–1916)

Personal information
- Full name: William Jonas
- Date of birth: September 1890
- Place of birth: Cambois, England
- Date of death: 27 July 1916 (aged 25)
- Place of death: Delville Wood, Longueval, France
- Height: 5 ft 8 in (1.73 m)
- Positions: Half back; forward

Senior career*
| Years | Team | Apps | (Gls) |
| –1910 | Jarrow Croft | | |
| 1910–1912 | Havanna Rovers | | (68) |
| 1912–1915 | Clapton Orient | 70 | (21) |
- * Club domestic league appearances and goals

William Jonas (September 1890 – 27 July 1916), usually known as Billy or Willie, was an English footballer who played in the Football League for Clapton Orient.

== Career ==
Starting his career with Jarrow Croft, Jonas scored twice in a Gateshead Charity Cup Final and turned down an offer from Barnsley before moving to Havanna Rovers in 1910. Jonas was known for his quickness and passing ability on the pitch. He once filled in at goal for an injured Jimmy Hugall in a match versus Nottingham Forest. He scored 68 goals in his two seasons with Havanna, and moved to Clapton Orient in June 1912 on advice from his friend and fellow Orient player Richard McFadden.

At Orient, Jonas could play in almost any position, even making several appearances in goal. He was sent off during a match at Millwall in January 1915 for fighting with the home goalkeeper Joseph Orme, an incident which started a riot among the 16,900 crowd that had to be quelled by police on horseback.

Jonas was very popular with the female supporters at Clapton Orient – so much so that he was getting a bags of fan mail from the ladies by the week. Things got so bad that he had to put an official request in the Orient programme for the letters to cease as he was "very happily married to his dear wife Mary Jane".

== Personal life ==
Prior to moving to London in 1912, Jonas worked at Cambois Colliery. At the outbreak of World War I professional football was suspended and Jonas joined the 17th Middlesex Regiment, the "Footballers' Battalion". During the Battle of the Somme, Jonas became trapped in a trench with his Orient teammate McFadden while fighting at Delville Wood. Under heavy fire, he said goodbye to McFadden, jumped out of the trench and was killed instantly. Having no known grave at the war's end, he was commemorated on the Commonwealth Thiepval Memorial.
