= William Baker (footballer) =

English footballer

Personal information
- Full name: William James Baker
- Date of birth: 1882
- Place of birth: Plymouth, England
- Date of death: October 22, 1916 (aged 33)
- Place of death: Serre-lès-Puisieux, France
- Position: Wing half

Senior career*
Years	Team	Apps	(Gls)
- Green Waves
- De Beers
–1909	Green Waves		
1909–1915	Plymouth Argyle	193	(1)
- * Club domestic league appearances and goals

William James Baker MM (1882 – 22 October 1916) was an English professional footballer who made over 190 appearances as a wing half in the Southern League for Plymouth Argyle between 1909 and 1915. He also played in the United States and South Africa.

== Personal life ==
Baker was married. He served in the Football Battalion of the Middlesex Regiment during the First World War and rose to the rank of sergeant. He was wounded in action at Vimy Ridge in June 1916 and received the Military Medal. On 22 October 1916, Baker was killed by German artillery fire near Serre-lès-Puisieux during the Battle of the Somme and is commemorated at Sucrerie Military Cemetery at Colincamps.

== Career statistics ==
Appearances and goals by club, season and competition
Club	Season	League			FA Cup		Total	
Club	Season	Division	Apps	Goals	Apps	Goals	Apps	Goals
Plymouth Argyle	1909–10	Southern League First Division	37	0	2	0	39	0
Plymouth Argyle	1910–11	Southern League First Division	31	1	1	0	32	1
Plymouth Argyle	1911–12	Southern League First Division	33	0	1	0	34	0
Plymouth Argyle	1912–13	Southern League First Division	35	0	2	0	37	0
Plymouth Argyle	1913–14	Southern League First Division	36	0	2	0	38	0
Plymouth Argyle	1914–15	Southern League First Division	21	0	1	0	22	0
Career total			193	1	9	0	202	1
