= Frederick Parker =

Frederick or Fred Parker may refer to:

- Frederick Parker (furniture manufacturer), British furniture manufacturer
- Frederick Parker (cricketer) (1913–1988), English cricketer
- Frederick Parker, a character in Angel on My Shoulder
- Jack Parker (hurdler) (Frederick John Parker, 1927–2022), British hurdler
- Chubby Parker (Frederick R. Parker, 1876–1940), American old-time and folk musician and early radio entertainer
- Fred I. Parker (1938–2003), federal judge in the United States
- Fred Parker (footballer, born 1893) (1893–?), English footballer
- Fred Parker (footballer, born 1886) (1886–1963), English football forward and manager
- Freddie Parker (born 1962), former running back in the National Football League
- Fred Parker (ice hockey), former ice hockey coach
- Fred Parker Jr. (born 1980), American actor
