= The Half-Breed's Way =

1912 film

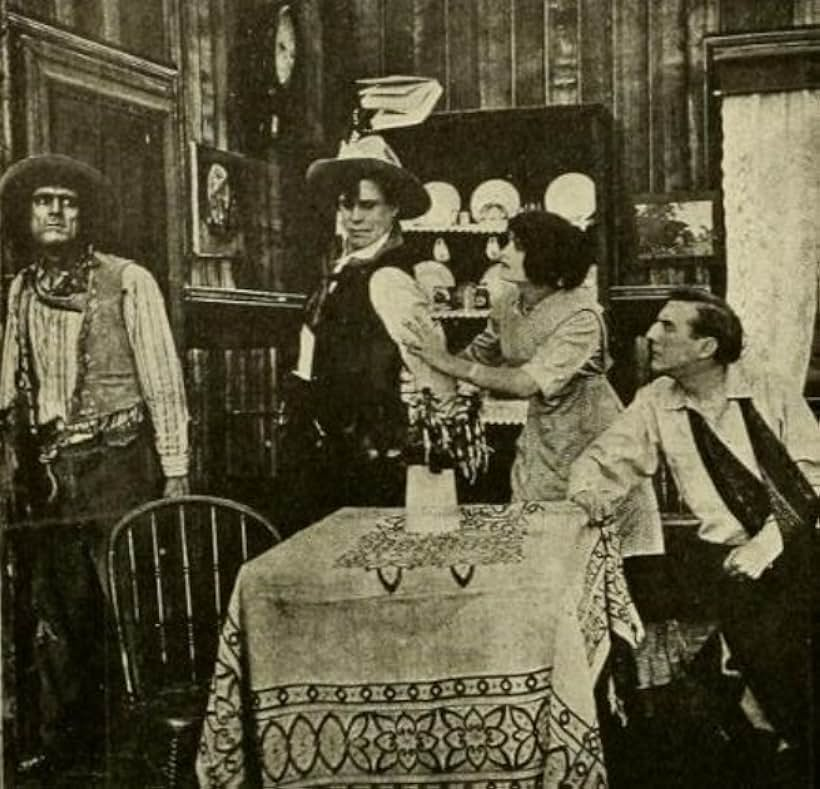
- Starring: Harry von Meter; Vivian Rich; George Beech
- Distributed by: Universal Film Manufacturing Company
- Release date: June 2, 1912
- Country: United States
- Languages: Silent; English intertitles

The Half-Breed's Way is a 1912 American short silent Western film starring Harry von Meter, Vivian Rich and George Beech.

== Plot ==
David Miller, a rancher, is an alcoholic. He heads east and marries Mary, taking her to his Western ranch. He continues to drink, and his young wife suffers extreme cruelty at his hands. A half-breed cowboy, who works on the ranch, becomes devoted to protecting her. Philip Hall, an Easterner, heads west for his health, and Miller finds him work. He is injured in a roundup, and Mary cares for him. He is a ray of light in her lonely life, and his heart fills with compassion for the young woman. David goes on a drunken rampage and destroys Mary's small garden. When she objects, he threatens her life. The half-breed puts himself between them again, and David throws him to the ground. The half-breed gets up, and the sight of the weeping woman makes him swear to avenge the Indians. The story ends with him confessing his love and being chased by the police.
