= Harry Gibson (disambiguation) =

Harry Gibson (1915–1991) was a jazz pianist, singer and songwriter.

Harry Gibson may also refer to:

- Harry Gibson (Australian footballer) (1878–1921), Australian rules footballer for South Melbourne
- Harry Gibson (English footballer), English footballer for Clapton Orient
- Harry Gibson (field hockey) (born 1993), English field hockey player
