= Frederick Goodwin =

Frederick Goodwin may refer to:

- Frederick K. Goodwin (1936–2020), psychiatrist
- Sir Frederick Tutu Goodwin, Queen's Representative
- Frederick D. Goodwin (1888–1968), bishop of the Episcopal Diocese of Virginia
- Fred Goodwin (born 1958), Scottish banker
- Freddie Goodwin (1933–2016), English footballer and cricketer
- Freddie Goodwin (footballer, born 1944), former English footballer
- Fred Goodwin (footballer) (1888–1945), English footballer who played in the Football League for Burnley

== See also ==
- Fred Goodwins (1891–1923), silent film actor and director
