= Arthur Tilley =

Arthur Tilley may refer to:

- Arthur Augustus Tilley (1851–1942), academic of the University of Cambridge
- Arthur Tilley (footballer) (1892–1984), English football outside right

== See also ==
- Arthur Tiley (1910–1994), British businessman and Conservative and National Liberal politician
