= Pat Gallacher =

Scottish footballer

Personal information
- Full name: Patrick Joseph Gallacher
- Date of birth: 17 March 1881
- Place of birth: Camlachie, Scotland
- Date of death: 8 April 1951 (aged 70)
- Place of death: Tottenham, England
- Height: 6 ft 0 in (1.83 m)
- Position: Outside forward

Senior career*
Years	Team	Apps	(Gls)
1899–1901	Duntocher Hibernian		
1901–1902	Rockvale		
1904–1905	Tottenham Hotspur	0	(0)
1905–1907	Luton Town	44	(4)
1907–1908	Partick Thistle	26	(0)
1908–1910	Workington		
1910–1914	Barrow		
1914–1923	Ton Pentre		

Managerial career
- 1909–1910: Workington
- * Club domestic league appearances and goals

Patrick Joseph Gallacher (17 March 1881 – 8 April 1951) was a Scottish professional footballer who played as an outside forward in the Scottish League for Partick Thistle. He also played in the Southern League for Luton Town and in the Western League for Tottenham Hotspur.

== Personal life ==
Gallacher served as a private in the 1st and 2nd Football Battalions during the First World War and by May 1917, he was the trainer of the 1st battalion's football team. He served the final six months of the war as an appointed lance corporal in the Rifle Brigade and the Artists Rifles. In later life, Gallacher worked as a groundsman and at Enfield Cable Works. At the time of his death in April 1951, Gallacher lived within sight of White Hart Lane on Trulock Road, Tottenham.

== Career statistics ==
Appearances and goals by club, season and competition
Club	Season	League			National Cup		Total	
Club	Season	Division	Apps	Goals	Apps	Goals	Apps	Goals
Partick Thistle	1907–08	Scottish First Division	26	0	2	0	28	0
Career total			26	0	2	0	28	0

== Honours ==
Ton Pentre

- Welsh League First Division: 1914–15
