= George Ford (footballer) =

English footballer

Personal information
- Full name: George Edward Ford
- Date of birth: 1889
- Place of birth: Woolwich, England
- Height: 5 ft 8 in (1.73 m)
- Position: Left back

Senior career*
Years	Team	Apps	(Gls)
- Gravesend United
1910–1912	Dartford		
1912–1915	Woolwich Arsenal	9	(0)
- * Club domestic league appearances and goals

George Edward Ford (1889 – after 1916) was an English amateur footballer who played in the Football League for Woolwich Arsenal as a left back.

== Personal life ==
Ford served as a sergeant with the Football Battalion of the Middlesex Regiment during the First World War and was wounded in the left arm whilst attacking The Quadrilateral on the opening day of the Battle of the Ancre in November 1916. The injury led to his discharge from the army in October 1917 and his retirement from football.

== Career statistics ==
Appearances and goals by club, season and competition
Club	Season	League			FA Cup		Total	
Club	Season	Division	Apps	Goals	Apps	Goals	Apps	Goals
Woolwich Arsenal	1912–13	First Division	3	0	0	0	3	0
Woolwich Arsenal	1914–15	First Division	6	0	1	0	7	0
Career total			9	0	1	0	10	0
