= Thomas Newton (footballer) =

English footballer

Personal information
- Full name: Thomas Newton
- Place of birth: Ryton, England
- Height: 5 ft 10 1/2 in (1.79 m)
- Position: Goalkeeper

Senior career*
Years	Team	Apps	(Gls)
–1912	Blaydon United		
1912–1914	Croydon Common	20	(1)
1915	Swindon Town	0	(0)
1919–1920	Newburn		
1920–1922	Portsmouth	49	(0)
1923–1924	Scotswood		
1924–1925	Ashington	16	(0)
- Crawcrook Albion
- * Club domestic league appearances and goals

Thomas Newton (fl. c. 1890s – 1924) was an English professional footballer who played as a goalkeeper in the Football League for Portsmouth and Ashington.

== Personal life ==
Newton served as a private in the Football Battalion of the Middlesex Regiment during the First World War. He was the battalion's first casualty on active service, suffering an injury while disembarking SS Bellerophon at Le Havre in the early hours of 17 November 1915. He was wounded and made a prisoner of war by the Germans on 13 November 1916.

== Career statistics ==
Appearances and goals by club, season and competition
Club	Season	League			FA Cup		Total	
Club	Season	Division	Apps	Goals	Apps	Goals	Apps	Goals
Croydon Common	1912–13	Southern League Second Division	20	1	4	1	24	2
Portsmouth	1920–21	Third Division	1	0	0	0	1	0
Portsmouth	1921–22	Third Division South	8	0	0	0	8	0
Portsmouth	1922–23	Third Division South	40	0	2	0	42	0
Portsmouth	Total		49	0	2	0	51	0
Career total			69	1	6	1	75	2
