= Tommy Codd =

English footballer

Personal information
- Full name: Thomas Henry Codd
- Date of birth: 1890
- Place of birth: Grimsby, England
- Date of death: 1961 (aged 70–71)
- Position: Outside left

Senior career*
| Years | Team | Apps | (Gls) |
- Goole Town
| 1914–1915 | Leicester Fosse | 13 | (0) |
- Harrogate
- * Club domestic league appearances and goals

Thomas Henry Codd (1890–1961) was an English professional footballer who played in the Football League for Leicester Fosse as an outside left.

== Personal life ==
9 months after the outbreak of the First World War, Codd enlisted in the Football Battalion of the Middlesex Regiment in May 1915. In June 1916, Codd was hit by shrapnel in the left eye at Vimy Ridge and, suffering from severe shell shock, was carried two miles back to safety under heavy fire by fellow footballer Arthur Mounteney. Codd lost the eye and later served in the Army Service Corps before his discharge from the army in June 1918.

== Career statistics ==
Appearances and goals by club, season and competition
| Club | Season | League | | | FA Cup | | Total | |
| Club | Season | Division | Apps | Goals | Apps | Goals | Apps | Goals |
|---|---|---|---|---|---|---|---|---|
| Leicester Fosse | 1914–15 | Second Division | 13 | 0 | 0 | 0 | 13 | 0 |
| Career total | | | 13 | 0 | 0 | 0 | 13 | 0 |
