= Fred Goodwin (footballer) =

English footballer

Personal information
- Date of birth: 1888
- Place of birth: Congleton, England
- Date of death: 1945 (aged 56–57)
- Place of death: Macclesfield, England
- Position: Outside left

Senior career*
Years	Team	Apps	(Gls)
1906	Burnley	1	(0)
1906–	Leek		
–1907	Congleton Town		
1907–1908	Macclesfield	29	(3)
1908–1909	Congleton Town		
1909–1910	Macclesfield	12	(3)
1910–1911	Leek		
1911–1913	Brighton & Hove Albion	49	(12)
1913	West Ham United	0	(0)
1913–1915	Exeter City	40	(5)
- * Club domestic league appearances and goals

Fred P. Goodwin (1888–1945) was an English professional footballer who played as an outside forward in the Southern League for Brighton & Hove Albion and Exeter City. He made one appearance in the Football League for Burnley.

== Career ==
Goodwin joined First Division club Burnley in November 1906. His sole appearance was the only match of the 1906–07 season that regular outside left Albert Smith missed. Between 1906 and 1911, Goodwin played in non-League football for Leek, Congleton Town and Macclesfield. In May 1911, he was transferred to Southern League First Division club Brighton & Hove Albion. During a match versus Luton Town in April 1912, Goodwin was involved in an incident which led to the death of Luton's Sam Wightman. A late tackle caught Wightman in the stomach and following a rupture to his small intestine, he died from peritonitis and shock. Goodwin was exonerated from all blame following the coroner's recommendation, who stated "that the kick was done purely accidentally". Goodwin later played for West Ham United and Exeter City. During Exeter City's 1914 tour of South America, Goodwin was involved in every single match, which included the Brazilian national team's first ever fixture.

== Personal life ==
After pre-war service with the Cheshire Regiment, Goodwin served as a sergeant in the Football Battalion and the London Regiment during the First World War. Wounds suffered during the war ended his football career.

== Career statistics ==
Appearances and goals by club, season and competition
Club	Season	League			FA Cup		Other		Total	
Club	Season	Division	Apps	Goals	Apps	Goals	Apps	Goals	Apps	Goals
Burnley	1906–07	First Division	1	0	0	0	—		1	0
Macclesfield	1907–08	Manchester League	29	3	4	0	5 (Note: Appearances in Cheshire Senior Cup)	1	38	4
Macclesfield	1908–09	Manchester League	12	3	—		—		12	3
Macclesfield	1909–10	Manchester League	2	0	0	0	0	0	2	0
Macclesfield	Total		43	6	4	0	5	1	52	7
Exeter City	1913–14	Southern League First Division	14	2	0	0	—		14	2
Exeter City	1914–15	Southern League First Division	26	3	0	0	—		26	3
Exeter City	Total		40	5	0	0	—		40	5
Career total			84	11	4	0	5	1	93	12

== Honours ==
Macclesfield

- Manchester League: 1908–09
