= Fred Bartholomew =

English footballer

Personal information
- Full name: Frederick Charles Bartholomew
- Date of birth: 3 January 1885
- Place of birth: Reading, Berkshire, England
- Date of death: 1979 (aged 93–94)
- Position: Utility player

Senior career*
Years	Team	Apps	(Gls)
–1904	Reading Biscuits		
1904–1923	Reading	164	(9)
- * Club domestic league appearances and goals

Frederick Charles Bartholomew (3 January 1885 – 1979) was an English professional footballer who made over 160 appearances in the Southern and Football Leagues for Reading. He served as a player, coach and groundsman for 53 years and is a member of the club's Hall of Fame. A utility player, his primary positions were centre half or full back.

== Personal life ==
Bartholomew served as a colour sergeant with the Middlesex Regiment's 1st Football Battalion during the First World War. After retiring from football in 1923, he spent three years on the coaching staff at Reading and then became groundsman at Elm Park until his retirement in 1957.

== Honours ==
Reading

- Southern League Second Division: 1910–11

Individual

- Reading Hall of Fame
