= Peter Roney =

Scottish footballer

Personal information
- Date of birth: 15 January 1886
- Place of birth: Knightswood, Scotland
- Date of death: 25 August 1930 (aged 44)
- Place of death: Scotstoun, Scotland
- Height: 5 ft 9 in (1.75 m)
- Position: Goalkeeper

Senior career*
Years	Team	Apps	(Gls)
- Petershill
–1905	Strathclyde		
1905–1906	Cambuslang Hibernian		
1906–1907	Ayr	18	(0)
1907–1909	Norwich City	53	(0)
1909–1915	Bristol Rovers	178	(1)
–1919	Ayr United	0	(0)
1919–1921	Albion Rovers	10	(0)
1921	Ashington		
- * Club domestic league appearances and goals

Peter Roney (15 January 1886 – 25 August 1930) was a Scottish professional footballer who played as a goalkeeper for Southern League clubs Norwich City and Bristol Rovers prior to the First World War.

== Footballing career ==
Roney began his footballing career in Scotland with Petershill, Strathclyde and Cambuslang Hibernian, before moving to Scottish League Second Division club Ayr in October 1906. He moved to England in May 1907 and joined Southern League First Division club Norwich City. Two years later, Roney joined divisional rivals Bristol Rovers and became one of the first goalkeepers to score a goal, when he scored from the penalty spot in the club's final match of the 1909–10 season. As of October 2026, Roney is the only goalkeeper to have scored for Bristol Rovers. He made a total of 178 Southern League appearances during his six-year stint with the club. Roney finished his career after the First World War with Ayr United, Albion Rovers and Ashington.

== Personal life ==
Roney was born at Knightswood Hospital, Scotland in January 1886. He married his wife Violet in 1909 and at the time of the 1911 census he had one son, Kenneth. Whilst a player with Bristol Rovers, the family lived in Eastville.

In 1914 Roney joined the 17th Middlesex Battalion, better known as the Football Battalion, with whom he served as a private in the First World War. He later transferred to the Machine Gun Corps. He found the realities of war difficult to cope with and the mental traumas that he suffered meant that he only briefly returned professional football, it being reported in 1919 that he had undergone "such experiences during the war that he is unlikely to be heard of again in professional football". It was reported in November 1919 that Roney was seriously ill at home in Ashington.

You could hear the Germans talking and singing among themselves as though there was no war on at all. Then all of a sudden our artillery would send them a reminder, and then all you could hear were cries of agony. I've nearly turned grey listening to the groans of the wounded.

— Peter Roney, March 1917

His plight became a matter of concern to Bristol Rovers in 1921 when he was said to have been "down on his luck", "[lying] on a bed of sickness" and suffering from severe rheumatism as a result of his war service. The directors of the football club donated ten guineas (£10.10s) to him and arranged for a collection to be made at a Southern League match between Bristol Rovers and Norwich City, his two former clubs.

Roney died on 25 August 1930 in Scotstoun, Scotland, at the age of 43.

== Sources ==
- Byrne, Stephen; Jay, Mike (2003). Bristol Rovers Football Club – The Definitive History 1883–2003. Stroud: Tempus. ISBN 0-7524-2717-2.
