= Tom McKenna (footballer, born 1891) =

Irish footballer

Personal information
- Full name: Thomas Patrick McKenna
- Date of birth: October 1891
- Place of birth: Tullamore, Ireland
- Date of death: 1974 (aged 82–83)
- Height: 5 ft 9 in (1.75 m)
- Positions: Left back; half back

Senior career*
| Years | Team | Apps | (Gls) |
- Shelbourne
- Garston
- Colne
| 1911–1912 | Burnley | 0 | (0) |
| 1912–1913 | Barrow | | |
| 1913–1915 | Grimsby Town | 16 | (0) |
| 1915–1921 | Belfast United | | |
| 1921–1922 | Barrow | 16 | (0) |
- Kendal Town
- Morecambe
- Ulverston Town

Managerial career
- 1928–1930: Merthyr Town
- * Club domestic league appearances and goals

Thomas Patrick McKenna (October 1891 – 1974) was an Irish professional footballer who played as a left back in the Football League for Grimsby Town and Barrow. He later managed Merthyr Town.

== Personal life ==
McKenna served as a private in the Football Battalion of the Middlesex Regiment during the First World War.

== Career statistics ==
Appearances and goals by club, season and competition
| Club | Season | League | | | FA Cup | | Total | |
| Club | Season | Division | Apps | Goals | Apps | Goals | Apps | Goals |
|---|---|---|---|---|---|---|---|---|
| Grimsby Town | 1914–15 | Second Division | 10 | 0 | 0 | 0 | 10 | 0 |
| Career total | | | 10 | 0 | 0 | 0 | 10 | 0 |
