= George Beech =

English footballer

Personal information
- Full name: George Beech
- Date of birth: 15 March 1892
- Place of birth: Sheffield, England
- Date of death: 4 January 1964 (aged 71)
- Place of death: Brighton, England
- Height: 5 ft 8 in (1.73 m)
- Positions: Forward; left back

Senior career*
Years	Team	Apps	(Gls)
–1911	Attercliffe Sports Club		
1911–1914	The Wednesday	0	(0)
1914–????	Brighton & Hove Albion	6	(0)
–1921	Bridgend Town		
1921–1924	Ebbw Vale		
1924–1925	Brighton & Hove Albion	2	(0)
- * Club domestic league appearances and goals

George Beech (15 March 1892 – 4 January 1964) was an English professional footballer who played as a forward and left back in the Football League for Brighton & Hove Albion. He served as a coach during his second spell with the club.

== Personal life ==
Beech served as an acting sergeant with the Middlesex Regiment's 1st Football Battalion during the First World War. After his retirement from football, Beech ran pubs in Brighton and qualified as a masseur. He trained the Brighton Tigers between 1949 and 1952.

== Career statistics ==
Appearances and goals by club, season and competition
Club	Season	League			FA Cup		Total	
Club	Season	Division	Apps	Goals	Apps	Goals	Apps	Goals
Brighton & Hove Albion	1914–15	Southern League First Division	4	0	0	0	4	0
Career total			4	0	0	0	4	0
