= William Oliver (footballer) =

English footballer

Personal information
- Full name: William Oliver
- Date of birth: September 1892
- Place of birth: Walthamstow, England
- Height: 5 ft 8 in (1.73 m)
- Position: Outside left

Senior career*
Years	Team	Apps	(Gls)
1908–1909	Tottenham Hotspur	0	(0)
1909–1913	Walthamstow Grange		
1913–1915	Tottenham Hotspur	2	(0)
- * Club domestic league appearances and goals

William Oliver (born September 1892; date of death unknown) was an English professional footballer who played in the Football League for Tottenham Hotspur as an outside left.

== Career ==
Oliver began his career at Tottenham Hotspur in 1908, before joining Walthamstow Grange the following year. The outside left re-joined Spurs in 1913 and made two appearances for the White Hart Lane club, before leaving for the second time in 1915.

== Personal life ==
In December 1914, four months after the outbreak of the First World War, Oliver was one of the first footballers to enlist in the Football Battalion of the Middlesex Regiment. He was deployed to the Western Front in November 1915. After just 15 days of active service, he returned to Britain after suffering a knee injury and was subsequently discharged from the army in September 1916.

== Career statistics ==
Appearances and goals by club, season and competition
Club	Season	League			FA Cup		Total	
Club	Season	Division	Apps	Goals	Apps	Goals	Apps	Goals
Tottenham Hotspur	1913–14	First Division	2	0	0	0	2	0
Career total			2	0	0	0	2	0
