= Nolan Evans =

English footballer

Personal information
- Full name: Nolan Edwin Evans
- Date of birth: 1885
- Place of birth: Ashton-in-Makerfield, England
- Date of death: 1948 (aged 62–63)
- Place of death: Ashton-in-Makerfield, England
- Height: 5 ft 7 1/2 in (1.71 m)
- Position: Left back

Senior career*
Years	Team	Apps	(Gls)
–1909	Brynn Central		
1909–1910	St Helens Recreation		
1910–1912	Exeter City	63	(2)
1912–1914	Clapton Orient	111	(1)
- * Club domestic league appearances and goals

Nolan Evans (1885–1948), sometimes known as Peggy Evans, was an English professional footballer who played in the Football League for Clapton Orient as a left back.

== Personal life ==
Evans worked as a miner. He served as a sergeant in the Football Battalion of the Middlesex Regiment during the First World War. Evans was wounded in the thigh at Delville Wood and nearly lost the leg as a result. He was wounded again in March 1918 and the effects caused his retirement from football.

== Career statistics ==
Appearances and goals by club, season and competition
Club	Season	League			FA Cup		Total	
Club	Season	Division	Apps	Goals	Apps	Goals	Apps	Goals
Exeter City	1910–11	Southern League First Division	29	1	0	0	29	1
Exeter City	1911–12	Southern League First Division	34	1	0	0	34	1
Exeter City	Total		63	2	0	0	63	2
Clapton Orient	1914–15	Second Division	37	0	1	0	38	0
Career total			100	2	1	0	101	2
