= George Woolston Pyke =

English footballer

George Pyke
Personal information
- Full name: George Woolston Pyke
- Date of birth: 28 August 1893
- Place of birth: Gateshead, England
- Date of death: 1977 (aged 83–84)
- Place of death: Whitley Bay, England
- Height: 5 ft 8 3/4 in (1.75 m)
- Position: Centre forward

Senior career*
| Years | Team | Apps | (Gls) |
- Rutherford College
| 1913–1922 | Newcastle United | 13 | (3) |
- → Durham City (guest)
| 1922–1927 | Blyth Spartans | | (135) |
- * Club domestic league appearances and goals

George Woolston Pyke (28 August 1893 – 1977) was an English professional footballer who played in the Football League for Newcastle United as a centre forward. He had a notable spell in the North Eastern League with Blyth Spartans, for whom he scored 135 goals.

== Personal life ==
Pyke served as a corporal in the Football Battalion of the Middlesex Regiment during the First World War.

== Career statistics ==
Appearances and goals by club, season and competition
| Club | Season | League | | | FA Cup | | Total | |
| Club | Season | Division | Apps | Goals | Apps | Goals | Apps | Goals |
|---|---|---|---|---|---|---|---|---|
| Newcastle United | 1919–20 | First Division | 3 | 0 | 0 | 0 | 3 | 0 |
| Newcastle United | 1920–21 | First Division | 7 | 3 | 0 | 0 | 7 | 3 |
| Newcastle United | 1921–22 | First Division | 3 | 0 | 0 | 0 | 3 | 0 |
| Career total | | | 13 | 3 | 0 | 0 | 13 | 3 |
