= Hugh Gallacher (footballer, born 1891) =

Scottish footballer

Hugh Gallagher
Personal information
- Full name: Hugh M. Gallagher
- Date of birth: 15 October 1891
- Place of birth: Milton, Scotland
- Date of death: December 1920 (aged 29)
- Place of death: Glasgow, Scotland
- Position: Left half

Senior career*
Years	Team	Apps	(Gls)
–1913	Rutherglen Glencairn		
1913	Partick Thistle	0	(0)
1913–1914	Bristol Rovers	8	(2)
1914–1916	Aberdeen	9	(0)
- * Club domestic league appearances and goals

Hugh M. Gallagher (15 October 1891 – December 1920) was a Scottish footballer who played as a left half in the Scottish League for Aberdeen.

== Personal life ==
Gallagher served with the Football Battalion and the Gordon Highlanders during the First World War.

== Career statistics ==
Appearances and goals by club, season and competition
Club	Season	League			National Cup		Other		Total	
Club	Season	Division	Apps	Goals	Apps	Goals	Apps	Goals	Apps	Goals
Bristol Rovers	1913–14	Southern League First Division	6	2	0	0	—		6	2
Bristol Rovers	1914–15	Southern League First Division	2	0	0	0	—		2	0
Bristol Rovers	Total		8	2	0	0	—		8	2
Aberdeen	1915–16	Scottish League First Division	9	0	—		1 (Note: Appearance in Robertson Cup)	0	10	0
Career total			17	2	0	0	1	0	18	2

== Honours ==
Aberdeen

- Robertson Cup: 1915–16
