= Billy Spittle =

English footballer

Personal information
- Full name: William Arthur Spittle
- Date of birth: 19 March 1893
- Place of birth: Southfields, England
- Date of death: 12 February 1979 (aged 85)
- Place of death: Texas, United States
- Height: 5 ft 7 in (1.70 m)
- Position: Inside forward

Youth career
- Southfields Juniors

Senior career*
Years	Team	Apps	(Gls)
1912–1919	Arsenal	7	(0)
1919–1921	Leicester City	26	(3)
1921–1922	Nuneaton Town		(3)
- Tamworth Castle
- * Club domestic league appearances and goals

William Arthur Spittle (19 March 1893 – 12 February 1979) was an English professional footballer who played in the Football League for Leicester City and Arsenal as an inside forward.

== Personal life ==
Spittle served as a corporal in the Football Battalion during the First World War. A gunshot wound to the left shoulder led to his discharge in May 1918.

== Career statistics ==
Appearances and goals by club, season and competition
Club	Season	League			FA Cup		Total	
Club	Season	Division	Apps	Goals	Apps	Goals	Apps	Goals
Woolwich Arsenal	1912–13	First Division	6	0	0	0	6	0
Woolwich Arsenal	1913–14	Second Division	1	0	0	0	1	0
Woolwich Arsenal	Total		7	0	0	0	7	0
Leicester City	1919–20	Second Division	8	1	0	0	8	1
Leicester City	1920–21	Second Division	18	2	0	0	18	2
Leicester City	Total		26	3	0	0	26	3
Career total			33	3	0	0	33	3

== Honours ==
Nuneaton Town

- Nuneaton Charity Cup: 1921
