= Billy Thompson (footballer, born 1886) =

English footballer (1886–1933)

Personal information
- Full name: William Thompson
- Date of birth: 1 August 1886
- Place of birth: Morpeth, England
- Date of death: 1933 (aged 46–47)
- Positions: Outside right; inside forward; left half

Senior career*
Years	Team	Apps	(Gls)
1904–1905	Grangetown Athletic		
1905–1906	Middlesbrough	6	(2)
1906–1907	Morpeth Harriers		
1907–1911	West Bromwich Albion	54	(6)
1911–	Haslingden	0	(0)
–1912	Rutherglen Glencairn		
1912–1913	Queens Park Rangers	33	(1)
1913–1914	Plymouth Argyle	4	(0)
1914–1920	Queens Park Rangers		
1916	→ Brentford (guest)	1	(0)
- → South Shields (guest)
1920–1921	Newport County	18	(0)
1921–1922	Hartlepools United	1	(0)
- Jarrow
- * Club domestic league appearances and goals

William Thompson (1 August 1886 – 1933) was an English professional footballer who played as a forward and left half in the Football League for West Bromwich Albion, Newport County, Middlesbrough and Hartlepools United. He also played in the Southern League and in non-League football.

== Career statistics ==
Appearances and goals by club, season and competition
Club	Season	League			National cup (Note: Includes FA Cup)		Other		Total	
Club	Season	Division	Apps	Goals	Apps	Goals	Apps	Goals	Apps	Goals
Middlesbrough	1905–06	First Division	6	2	0	0	—		6	2
West Bromwich Albion	1907–08	Second Division	1	1	0	0	—		1	1
West Bromwich Albion	1908–09	Second Division	27	4	2	0	—		29	4
West Bromwich Albion	1909–10	Second Division	18	1	0	0	—		18	1
West Bromwich Albion	1910–11	Second Division	8	0	1	0	—		9	0
West Bromwich Albion	Total		54	6	3	0	—		57	6
Queens Park Rangers	1912–13	Southern League First Division	33	1	2	0	7 (Note: 4 appearances in Southern Professional Charity Cup, 2 appearances in London Challenge Cup, 1 appearance in London Professional Charity Fund)	0	42	1
Plymouth Argyle	1913–14	Southern League First Division	4	0	0	0	—		4	0
Queens Park Rangers	1914–15	Southern League First Division	34	3	3	0	3 (Note: 1 appearance in Southern Professional Charity Cup, 1 appearance in London Challenge Cup, 1 appearance in London Professional Charity Fund)	0	40	3
Queens Park Rangers	1919–20	Southern League First Division	14	0	1	0	1 (Note: Appearance in London Challenge Cup)	0	16	0
Queens Park Rangers	Total		81	4	6	0	11	0	98	4
Hartlepools United	1921–22	Third Division North	1	0	0	0	—		1	0
Career Total			146	12	9	0	11	0	166	12
