= David Kenny (footballer, born 1891) =

Scottish footballer

Personal information
- Full name: David Brown Kenny
- Date of birth: 22 May 1891
- Place of birth: Maybole, Scotland
- Date of death: 11 December 1978 (aged 87)
- Place of death: Vancouver, British Columbia, Canada
- Height: 5 ft 10 in (1.78 m)
- Position: Centre half

Senior career*
Years	Team	Apps	(Gls)
1909–1910	Maybole		
1910–1911	Girvan		
1911–1912	Falkirk		
1912–1913	Barrow		
1913–1920	Grimsby Town	58	(0)
1920–1921	Bristol Rovers	11	(0)
1921–192?	Nainamo City		
- * Club domestic league appearances and goals

David Brown Kenny (22 May 1891 – 11 December 1978) was a Scottish professional footballer who played as a centre half in the Football League for Grimsby Town and Bristol Rovers.

== Personal life ==
Kenny worked as a shoemaker. In February 1915, six months since the outbreak of the First World War, he enlisted as a private in the Football Battalion of the Middlesex Regiment. He was wounded in 1916 and emigrated to Canada after the war.

== Career statistics ==
Appearances and goals by club, season and competition
Club	Season	League			National cup		Total	
Club	Season	Division	Apps	Goals	Apps	Goals	Apps	Goals
Grimsby Town	1914–15	Second Division	23	0	0	0	23	0
Bristol Rovers	1920–21	Third Division	11	0	0	0	11	0
Career Total			34	0	0	0	34	0
