= Alonzo Poulton =

English footballer

Personal information
- Full name: Alonzo Poulton
- Date of birth: 28 March 1890
- Place of birth: Wolverhampton, England
- Date of death: 1966 (aged 75–76)
- Place of death: Wolverhampton, England
- Height: 5 ft 9 in (1.75 m)
- Position: Forward

Senior career*
| Years | Team | Apps | (Gls) |
- Monmore Green
| –1912 | Priestfield Albion | | |
| 1912– | West Bromwich Albion | 9 | (1) |
| 1913 | → Worcester City (loan) | | |
| 1919–1920 | Merthyr Town | | |
| 1920–1921 | Middlesbrough | 18 | (5) |
| 1921–1922 | Bristol City | 28 | (9) |
| 1922–1923 | Reading | 25 | (3) |
- Llanelly
- Oakengates Town
- * Club domestic league appearances and goals

Alonzo Poulton (28 March 1890 – 1966), sometimes known as Jerry Poulton or Olly Poulton, was an English professional footballer who played as a forward in the Football League for Bristol City, Reading, Middlesbrough and West Bromwich Albion.

== Personal life ==
Poulton served as a private in the Football Battalion of the Middlesex Regiment during the First World War.

== Career statistics ==
Appearances and goals by club, season and competition
| Club | Season | League | | | FA Cup | | Total | |
| Club | Season | Division | Apps | Goals | Apps | Goals | Apps | Goals |
|---|---|---|---|---|---|---|---|---|
| West Bromwich Albion | 1914–15 | First Division | 9 | 1 | 0 | 0 | 9 | 1 |
| Middlesbrough | 1919–20 | First Division | 2 | 0 | 0 | 0 | 2 | 0 |
| Middlesbrough | 1920–21 | First Division | 14 | 5 | 1 | 0 | 15 | 5 |
| Middlesbrough | 1921–22 | First Division | 2 | 0 | 0 | 0 | 2 | 0 |
| Middlesbrough | Total | | 18 | 5 | 1 | 0 | 19 | 5 |
| Career total | | | 27 | 6 | 1 | 0 | 28 | 6 |
