= Jumbo Reason =

English footballer

Personal information
- Full name: Herbert Reason
- Date of birth: 1884
- Place of birth: Wanstead, England
- Position: Left back

Senior career*
Years	Team	Apps	(Gls)
1903–1905	Woodford		
1905–1910	Clapton Orient	91	(4)
- * Club domestic league appearances and goals

Herbert Reason was an English professional footballer who played in the Football League for Clapton Orient as a left back. He was nicknamed 'Jumbo', "due to his short and stocky build".

== Personal life ==
Reason was married with three children and worked as a bricklayer. He served as a private in the 1st Football Battalion of the Middlesex Regiment during the First World War.
