= Fred Parker (footballer, born 1886) =

English footballer

Personal information
- Full name: Frederick William Parker
- Date of birth: 18 June 1886
- Place of birth: Chickerell, England
- Date of death: 5 January 1963 (aged 76)
- Place of death: Barnet, England
- Position: Forward

Senior career*
Years	Team	Apps	(Gls)
- Gordon Athletic
- Portland Prison Officers
- Grove United
1903–1904	Weymouth	22	(9)
1907	Salisbury City		
1907–1922	Clapton Orient	336	(34)
- Folkestone

Managerial career
- Folkestone
- * Club domestic league appearances and goals

Frederick Parker (18 June 1886 – 5 January 1963), also known as Spider Parker or Bassie Parker, was an English professional footballer who played as a forward in the Football League for Clapton Orient. He was the first person to enlist in the Football Battalion during the First World War. He later served as manager of Folkestone.

== Personal life ==
Parker was married with five children. During his early football career, he worked as a carter on the Isle of Portland. Parker served as a colour sergeant with the Football Battalion of the Middlesex Regiment during the First World War. As captain of Clapton Orient, he was the first person to enlist in the newly formed battalion in December 1914. Parker suffered with trench foot in 1917 and was lightly wounded in April 1918. After his retirement from football, Parker worked as a porter at London King's Cross railway station and as a cleaner at government offices. Following his death in January 1963, he was buried in Southgate Cemetery.

== Career statistics ==
Appearances and goals by club, season and competition
Club	Season	League			FA Cup		Total	
Club	Season	Division	Apps	Goals	Apps	Goals	Apps	Goals
Clapton Orient	1914–15	Second Division	37	2	1	0	38	2
Career total			37	2	1	0	38	2
