= Wilf Nixon =

English footballer (1882–1985)

Personal information
- Full name: Wilfred Nixon
- Date of birth: 22 October 1882
- Place of birth: Workington, England
- Date of death: 8 April 1985 (aged 102)
- Place of death: Gateshead, England
- Height: 6 ft 0 in (1.83 m)
- Position: Goalkeeper

Senior career*
Years	Team	Apps	(Gls)
1902–1903	Newcastle United	0	(0)
- Hexham
- Carlisle United
- Wallsend Park Villa
- Haltwhistle Black Diamond
- Newburn
1912–1920	Fulham	27	(0)
1915–1916	→ Queens Park Rangers (guest)	11	(0)
- * Club domestic league appearances and goals

Wilfred Nixon (22 October 1882 – 8 April 1985) was an English professional footballer who played in the Football League for Fulham as a goalkeeper.

== Personal life ==
Nixon served as a private in the Football Battalion of the Middlesex Regiment during the First World War. He was captured by the Germans in Oppy on 28 April 1917 and was then interned as a prisoner of war. Nixon died at home in Gateshead on 8 April 1985, at the age of 102.

== Career statistics ==
Appearances and goals by club, season and competition
Club	Season	League			FA Cup		Total	
Club	Season	Division	Apps	Goals	Apps	Goals	Apps	Goals
Fulham	1914–15	Second Division	19	0	2	0	21	0
Career total			19	0	2	0	21	0
