= Harry Gibson (English footballer) =

English footballer

Personal information
- Full name: Harold Thomas Gibson
- Place of birth: Hoxton, England
- Position: Left half

Senior career*
| Years | Team | Apps | (Gls) |
- Hoxton Hall
| 1913–1918 | Clapton Orient | 30 | (0) |
- * Club domestic league appearances and goals

Harold Thomas Gibson was an English professional footballer who played as a left back in the Football League for Clapton Orient.

== Personal life ==
Gibson fought with the 17th (Service) and 21st (Service) Battalions of the Middlesex Regiment for the majority of the First World War and rose to the rank of sergeant. He was commissioned as a lieutenant in the 1st (Service) Battalion of the Royal Guernsey Light Infantry on 27 August 1918. Wounds received during the course of Gibson's service caused his retirement from football in 1918. After the war, it was reported that he met an American woman and emigrated to the USA.

== Career statistics ==
Appearances and goals by club, season and competition
| Club | Season | League | | | FA Cup | | Total | |
| Club | Season | Division | Apps | Goals | Apps | Goals | Apps | Goals |
|---|---|---|---|---|---|---|---|---|
| Clapton Orient | 1914–15 | Second Division | 15 | 0 | 0 | 0 | 15 | 0 |
| Career total | | | 15 | 0 | 0 | 0 | 15 | 0 |
