= Henry Pennifer =

English footballer

Personal information
- Full name: Henry John Pennifer
- Place of birth: Stafford, England
- Date of death: 24 March 1918
- Place of death: near Pozières, France
- Position: Half back

Senior career*
Years	Team	Apps	(Gls)
1912–1913	Hampstead Town	20	(22)
1913–1914	Queens Park Rangers	3	(–)
Total		23	(22)
- * Club domestic league appearances and goals

Henry John Pennifer (died 24 March 1918) was an English professional footballer who played as a half back in the Southern Football League for Queens Park Rangers. He also played semi-professionally for London League club Hampstead Town.

== Personal life ==
Pennifer served as an appointed lance corporal in the 17th (Service) Battalion of the Duke of Cambridge's Own (Middlesex Regiment) during the First World War. Serving on the Western Front, he was killed in action near Pozières on 24 March 1918 and is commemorated on the Pozières Memorial.

== Career statistics ==
Appearances and goals by club, season and competition
Club	Season	League			FA Cup		Total	
Club	Season	Division	Apps	Goals	Apps	Goals	Apps	Goals
Hampstead Town	1912–13	London League	17	20	3	2	20	22
Queens Park Rangers	1914–15	Southern League First Division	3	—	0	0	3	0
Queens Park Rangers	1916–17	London Combination Principal Tournament	6	1			-	-
Career total			20	20	3	2	23	22
