= Frank Martin (footballer, born 1887) =

English footballer

Personal information
- Full name: Francis Martin
- Date of birth: 3 January 1887
- Place of birth: Gateshead, England
- Date of death: 5 July 1967 (aged 80)
- Place of death: Grimsby, England
- Height: 5 ft 8 in (1.73 m)
- Positions: Left half; right back

Senior career*
Years	Team	Apps	(Gls)
–1907	Gateshead Rodsley		
1907–1910	Hull City	29	(1)
1911–1920	Grimsby Town	159	(1)
1921–1922	Aberdare Athletic	10	(0)
- Cleethorpes Town
- Charlton's
- * Club domestic league appearances and goals

Francis Martin (3 January 1887 – 5 July 1967) was an English professional footballer who played in the Football League for Grimsby Town, Hull City and Aberdare Athletic as a left half and right back.

== Personal life ==
Martin was married with two children and worked as a stonemason. He served as a private with the Football Battalion of the Middlesex Regiment during the First World War. Martin was shot in the jaw near Beaumont-Hamel in April 1916 and remained in France until November 1916, before returning to Britain for recuperation and being medically discharged in August 1917.

== Career statistics ==
Appearances and goals by club, season and competition
Club	Season	League			FA Cup		Total	
Club	Season	Division	Apps	Goals	Apps	Goals	Apps	Goals
Hull City	1907–08	Second Division	19	1	3	0	22	1
Hull City	1908–09	Second Division	1	0	0	0	1	0
Hull City	1909–10	Second Division	4	0	0	0	4	0
Hull City	1910–11	Second Division	5	0	0	0	5	0
Hull City	Total		29	1	3	0	32	1
Grimsby Town	1914–15	Second Division	19	0	1	0	20	0
Career total			48	1	4	0	52	1
