= Jimmy Hugall =

English footballer

Personal information
- Full name: James Cockburn Hugall
- Date of birth: 26 April 1889
- Place of birth: Whitburn, England
- Date of death: 23 September 1927 (aged 38)
- Place of death: Sunderland, England
- Height: 5 ft 11 in (1.80 m)
- Position: Goalkeeper

Senior career*
Years	Team	Apps	(Gls)
–1907	Rectory Park Villa		
1907–	Sunderland Co-operative Wednesday		
- Sunderland Royal Rovers
1908–1910	Whitburn		
1910–1922	Clapton Orient	140	(0)
1918	→ Leeds City (guest)	1	(0)
1918–1919	→ Sunderland (guest)	5	(0)
1922–1923	Hamilton Academical	17	(0)
1923–1924	Durham City	35	(0)
- Seaham Colliery
- Sunderland Co-operative Wednesday
- * Club domestic league appearances and goals

James Cockburn Hugall (26 April 1889 – 23 September 1927) was an English professional footballer, best remembered for his 12 years in the Football League with Clapton Orient. A goalkeeper, he also played league football for Durham City and Hamilton Academical.

== Personal life ==
Hugall served as a corporal in the Football Battalion of the Middlesex Regiment during the First World War and was commissioned as a lieutenant into the 12th (Service) Battalion of the Durham Light Infantry on 24 July 1916. During the course of his service, he was wounded in both legs, the left eye and the left shoulder. At the time of Hugall's death after an operation in September 1927, he was the manager the George & Dragon hotel in Sunderland.

== Career statistics ==
Appearances and goals by club, season and competition
Club	Season	League			National Cup		Other		Total	
Club	Season	Division	Apps	Goals	Apps	Goals	Apps	Goals	Apps	Goals
Clapton Orient	1914–15	Second Division	31	0	1	0	—		32	0
Hamilton Academical	1922–23	Scottish First Division	17	0	0	0	1 (Note: Appearance in Lanarkshire Express Cup)	0	18	0
Career total			48	0	1	0	1	0	50	0
