= Joseph Orme =

English footballer

Personal information
- Full name: Joseph Henry Orme
- Date of birth: 8 November 1884
- Place of birth: Barrow Hill, England
- Date of death: 16 June 1935 (aged 50)
- Place of death: Nottingham, England
- Position: Goalkeeper

Senior career*
Years	Team	Apps	(Gls)
1904–1906	Clay Cross Zingari		
1906–1907	New Tupton Ivanhoe		
1907–1908	Clay Cross Zingari		
1908–1909	North Wingfield Red Rose		
1909–1910	Chesterfield Town	3	(0)
- Pinxton Colliery
1911–1913	Watford	13	(0)
1913–1918	Millwall Athletic	70	(0)
- → Notts County (guest)
1919–1920	Nottingham Forest	11	(0)
- Heanor Town
1922	Shirebrook		
1927	Butterley Company Works		
- * Club domestic league appearances and goals

Joseph Henry Orme (8 November 1884 – 16 June 1935) was an English professional footballer who played as a goalkeeper in the Football League for Nottingham Forest.

== Personal life ==
Orme served as a private in the Football Battalion of the Middlesex Regiment during the First World War.

== Career statistics ==
Appearances and goals by club, season and competition
Club	Season	League			FA Cup		Other		Total	
Club	Season	Division	Apps	Goals	Apps	Goals	Apps	Goals	Apps	Goals
Chesterfield Town	1909–10	Midland League	3	0	0	0	1 (Note: Appearance in Derbyshire Senior Cup)	0	4	0
Watford	1911–12	Southern League First Division	1	0	0	0	—		1	0
Watford	1912–13	Southern League First Division	12	0	0	0	1 (Note: Appearance in Southern Professional Charity Cup)	0	13	0
Watford	Total		13	0	0	0	1	0	14	0
Nottingham Forest	1919–20	Second Division	5	0	0	0	—		5	0
Nottingham Forest	1920–21	Second Division	6	0	0	0	—		6	0
Nottingham Forest	Total		11	0	0	0	—		11	0
Career total			27	0	0	0	2	0	29	0
