= Arthur Tilley (footballer) =

English footballer

Personal information
- Full name: Arthur William Tilley
- Date of birth: 6 March 1892
- Place of birth: Wellingborough, England
- Date of death: 1984 (aged 92)
- Height: 5 ft 8 in (1.73 m)
- Position: Outside right

Senior career*
Years	Team	Apps	(Gls)
- Fletton United
1912–1919	Clapton Orient	1	(0)
- Rugby Town
- * Club domestic league appearances and goals

Arthur William Tilley (6 March 1892 – 1984) was an English professional footballer who played in the Football League for Clapton Orient as an outside right.

== Personal life ==
Tilley served as a private with the 1st Football Battalion of the Middlesex Regiment during the First World War. He was discharged from the army in July 1916.
