= Joe Smith (football half-back, born 1889) =

English footballer (1889–1916)

Personal information
- Full name: Joseph Enoch Smith
- Date of birth: 1889
- Place of birth: Kilnhurst, England
- Date of death: 13 November 1916 (aged 27)
- Place of death: Serre-lès-Puisieux, France
- Position: Half back

Senior career*
Years	Team	Apps	(Gls)
- Hickleton Main Colliery
1912–1914	Birmingham	8	(0)
1914–1915	Chesterfield Town	30	(1)
- * Club domestic league appearances and goals

Joseph Enoch Smith (1889 – 13 November 1916) was an English professional footballer who played in the Football League for Birmingham. He played as a half back. He was killed in action in the First World War.

== Football career ==
Smith was born in Kilnhurst, Yorkshire. A coal miner by trade, he began his football career with his works team, Hickleton Main Colliery, before joining Birmingham in 1912. He made his debut in the Second Division on 4 January 1913, deputising for James Bumphrey in an away game against Wolverhampton Wanderers which finished 2–2. A defensive player, described as one who "held his opponents in check effectively, but should show more discretion putting the ball forward", he was unable to impose himself on the first team and after two seasons, in which he played only eight games, joined Chesterfield Town. Smith spent the 1914–15 season at the Midland League club, scoring once from 30 league games, before competitive football was suspended for the duration of the First World War.

== War service ==
Smith served in the 17th Battalion, Middlesex Regiment – the so-called "Footballers' Battalion" – in northern France. He rose to the rank of Company Serjeant Major and was killed at Serre, Pas-de-Calais, on 13 November 1916 near the end of the Battle of the Somme. Smith was mentioned in despatches for displaying considerable bravery, "after being wounded, again dashed into battle, only to be shot down", and is commemorated at Serre Road Cemetery No. 1.
