= Richard McFadden =

Scottish footballer

Personal information
- Date of birth: 1889
- Place of birth: Cambuslang, Lanarkshire, Scotland
- Date of death: 23 October 1916 (aged 27)
- Place of death: near Serre-lès-Puisieux, France
- Height: 5 ft 7 in (1.70 m)
- Position: Striker
| Occupation | Footballer |
| Years active | 1911-1915 |
| Organization(s) | Blyth, Wallsend Park Villa, Clapton Orient |

Richard McFadden MM (1889 – 23 October 1916) was a Scottish footballer who was Clapton Orient's top scorer for four consecutive seasons between 1911 and 1915.

Having moved from Scotland to Blyth as a boy, McFadden started his career in the Northern League with Blyth in November 1910, before moving to Wallsend Park Villa for a fee of £2. In May 1911, he joined Clapton Orient, scoring on his debut against Derby County on 2 September.

McFadden broke Orient's goalscoring record in his first season with the club, scoring 19 goals, only to break the record again in what was to be his final season, 1914–1915, with 21 goals. In the intervening two seasons, he was still Orient's top scorer. He also represented a Southern XI in a match against England in November 1914, scoring the only goal of the game, after which a Daily Express reporter declared that McFadden was the "outstanding player on the field".

McFadden attracted press attention off the pitch in 1912 when he rescued an 11-year-old boy from the River Lea, for which he received a medal from the Mayor of Hackney. Prior to joining Clapton Orient McFadden had also risked his own life when rescuing a man from a burning building.

At the outbreak of World War I professional football was suspended, and McFadden joined the Middlesex Regiment’s 17th battalion, nicknamed the "Footballers' Battalion", along with 40 other Orient players and staff. He rose to the rank of Company Sergeant Major. During the Battle of the Somme, he witnessed the death of his childhood friend and Orient teammate William Jonas in July 1916, and was injured himself a few weeks later. On his recovery he returned to the front and earned the Military Medal, but on 22 October 1916, McFadden was fatally wounded by a shell blast whilst leading his men near Serre-lès-Puisieux. He died of wounds the next day in a field hospital. His death was acknowledged by other football clubs, including Arsenal in their official programme, and the Manchester Football Chronicle stated, "In civil life he was a hero, and he proved himself a hero on the battlefield." McFadden is buried at Couin British Cemetery.

During his career he would go on to score a total of 66 goals.
