= John Baldock (footballer) =

English footballer

John Baldock was an association footballer who played for Queens Park Rangers F.C. between 1913 and 1920, including during the First World War. He made 143 appearances as a half back during his time at the club.
