= Jimmy McCormick (footballer, born 1883) =

English footballer

Personal information
- Full name: James McCormick
- Date of birth: 28 April 1883
- Place of birth: Rotherham, England
- Date of death: 28 January 1935 (aged 51)
- Place of death: Kimberley, Canada
- Position: Right half

Senior career*
| Years | Team | Apps | (Gls) |
- Attercliffe
| 1905–1907 | Sheffield United | 22 | (1) |
| 1907–1910 | Plymouth Argyle | 119 | (8) |
| 1910 | Sheffield United | 1 | (0) |
| 1910–1920 | Plymouth Argyle | 170 | (17) |
- * Club domestic league appearances and goals

James McCormick (28 April 1883 – 28 January 1935) was an English professional footballer who played 23 games in the Football League for Sheffield United, and 269 in the Southern League for Plymouth Argyle. He played as a right half.

McCormick was born in Rotherham. He joined Sheffield United from local football in the Sheffield area. On leaving the club in 1907, he played in the Southern League and the Western League for Plymouth Argyle. He made a brief return to Sheffield United before the 1910–11 season, but played only once before resuming his Argyle career in December 1910. He remained with the club until the League was suspended for the duration of the First World War. McCormick joined the 17th Middlesex Regiment, the Footballers' Battalion, in January 1915 and was promoted to Sergeant soon after enlisting. The battalion went to France in November 1915, where McCormick was wounded the following year by shrapnel in his forehead during the Battle of the Somme. McCormick carried a wounded comrade whose legs had been shattered, who guided him the wrong way down a trench and they were captured. He was taken to a prisoner of war camp in Saxony.

He was repatriated when the First World War ended and spent time in hospital recovering from malnutrition. McCormick played for Argyle again throughout the 1919–20 season and captained the side after Harry Wilcox retired early in the campaign. He made 305 appearances for the club in all competitions, scoring 26 goals, and retired from professional football before the club joined the Football League. McCormick emigrated to Canada in June 1920, where he captained Ladysmith Football Club on Vancouver Island. He suffered from tinnitus and deteriorating eyesight as he got older due to the injury sustained during the war and retired to Kimberley in 1930. McCormick died of cancer on 28 January 1935.
