= Jack Durston =

English cricketer and footballer

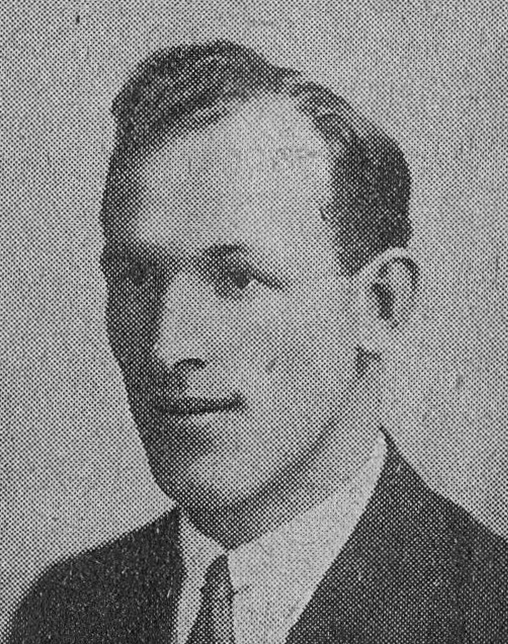
- Durston in 1920.

Personal information
- Full name: Frederick John Durston
- Born: 11 July 1893; Clophill, England
- Died: 8 April 1965 (aged 71); Norwood Green, England
- Height: 6 ft 5 in (196 cm)
- Batting: Right-handed
- Bowling: Right-arm fast, off-break

International information
- National side: England
- Only Test: 11 June 1921 v Australia

Career statistics
Competition	Test	First-class
Matches	1	386
Runs scored	8	3,918
Batting average	8.00	11.90
100s/50s	0/0	0/6
Top score	6*	92*
Balls bowled	202	72,124
Wickets	5	1,329
Bowling average	27.19	22.03
5 wickets in innings	0	72
10 wickets in match	0	11
Best bowling	4/102	8/27
Catches/stumpings	0/–	257/–
- Source: Cricinfo, 1 July 2025
Association football career
- Position: Goalkeeper
Senior career*
Years	Team	Apps	(Gls)
1912	Bedford Town	5	(0)
- Royal Engineers
- Queens Park Rangers
1919–1921	Brentford	44	(0)
- Northfleet United
- * Club domestic league appearances and goals

Frederick John Durston (11 July 1893 – 8 April 1965) was an English first-class cricketer who played for Middlesex and England. He is a member of the Middlesex Hall of Fame.

== Cricket career ==
A tall fast bowler with the ability to make the ball "break back" after pitching, Durston came to the fore in Middlesex's County Championship-winning seasons of 1920 and 1921, having played only a handful of matches before then. In both years, he took more than 100 wickets and after taking 11 wickets for MCC against the all-conquering 1921 Australian team led by Warwick Armstrong, he was picked for the second Test match on his home ground, Lord's. But though he took five wickets for 136 runs in the match, he was dropped and never played for England again.

Durston played for Middlesex until 1933, turning increasingly to off-spin as he got older and stouter. In all, he took 1,314 wickets. His batting improved with age and in 1927 he shared an unbroken ninth-wicket partnership of 160 – scored in only 80 minutes – with Patsy Hendren against Essex at Leyton that remained as a Middlesex record until 2011.

Durston ran an indoor cricket school at Acton in London from 1924 to 1958.

== Football career ==
Durston also played football as a goalkeeper for Royal Engineers, Queens Park Rangers, Brentford, Northfleet United and Bedford Town.

The Hackney Gazette Newspaper reported that the Brentford registered goalkeeper Corporal Jack Durston made 2 appearances for Clapton Orient during the December holiday period of 1917 both against Chelsea. On Christmas Day at Chelsea in a 4–1 defeat and on Boxing Day a 2–1 defeat at Millfields, Homerton. Source: Neilson N. Kaufman, honorary historian of nearly fifty years to Leyton Orient FC.

== Personal life ==
Durston served with the Royal Engineers during the First World War.
