= Labour Corps (United Kingdom) =

The Labour Corps was a British Army force formed in 1917 for manual and skilled labour on the Western Front and Salonika during the First World War. In previous centuries the British Army had fulfilled this role through the Royal Pioneer Corps (1762–1763), the Corps of Pioneers (1795–1800) and the Army Works Corps (1855-c.1856). Though it disbanded in 1921, it is often seen as the predecessor to the Royal Pioneer Corps of the Second World War.

== History ==
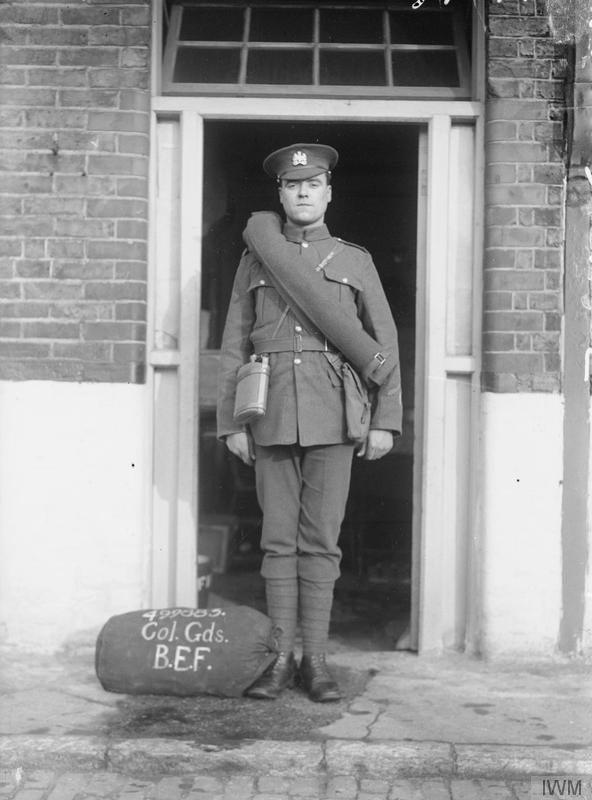
A private of the Reserve Employment Company (Labour Corps) in marching order during the First World War

Earlier in the war the Army Service Corps had formed labour companies to work docks and railways and unload ships and the Royal Engineers had formed eleven labour battalions for manual work. From December 1914 onwards each infantry division had also been provided with a Pioneer Battalion, with full infantry training but usually used in manual and skilled work and thus consisting of those with experience in those areas. From early 1916 onwards conscripted men with health too poor for fighting were also assigned to these battalions, twelve of which had been formed by June that year.

On 22 February 1917 an Army Order formed the Labour Corps, turning the pre-existing Infantry Labour Companies and Infantry Labour Battalions into 203 Labour Companies. The Corps as formed also included Depot Labour Companies (renamed Reserve Labour Companies later in 1917) back in the United Kingdom as well as seven Labour Battalions converted from the Works or Infantry Works battalions of the King's (Liverpool Regiment), the Devonshire Regiment, the Royal Scots Fusiliers, the Middlesex Regiment and the Durham Light Infantry. All these would be commanded by forty-two Labour Group Headquarters. Later in 1917 eight Labour Centres were added to the Corps, one for each of the eight home commands, as were the existing Infantry Works Companies (renamed Home Service Labour Companies) and Agricultural Companies.

In 1916, Colonel Richard S. H. Moody raised, from the Devonshire Regiment, and took to France, as Commander, a battalion of the Labour Corps, which he commanded from 1917 to 1918, after which he retired from active service. By November 1918 the Corps numbered around 389,900 men.
