= 1919–20 Southern Football League =

The 1919–20 season was the 22nd in the history of the Southern League, and the first following World War I. Portsmouth won the Southern League championship for the second time, whilst Mid Rhondda won Division Two. There were no promotions or relegations between divisions at the end of the season as all of the clubs in Division One bar Cardiff City were elected to the new Division Three of the Football League, with Cardiff elected to Division Two.

With only 10 clubs remaining (Caerphilly left the league) the league went through a realignment. The league was split into two national sections for England and Wales, with the winners of each section contesting a playoff for the Southern League championship. The remaining clubs in Division Two moved to the Welsh Section. In the English Section, Brighton & Hove Albion Reserves, Chatham Town, Millwall Reserves, Portsmouth Reserves, Reading Reserves, Southampton Reserves, and Watford Reserves rejoined the Southern League. New clubs to join were Boscombe, Charlton Athletic, Gillingham Reserves, Luton Town Reserves, Norwich City Reserves, and Thornycrofts.

== Division One ==
Southern Football League Division One
- Season: 1919–20
- Champions: Portsmouth (2nd title)
- Promoted: Cardiff City
- Relegated: none
- Matches: 462
- Goals: 1,275 (2.76 per match)

A total of 22 teams contest the division, including 18 sides from previous season and four new teams.

Teams promoted from 1914–15 Division Two:

- Merthyr Town
- Swansea Town
- Brentford
- Newport County

Pos	Team	Pld	W	D	L	GF	GA	GR	Pts	Qualification
1	Portsmouth	42	23	12	7	73	27	2.704	58	Elected to the new Football League Third Division
2	Watford	42	26	6	10	69	42	1.643	58	Elected to the new Football League Third Division
3	Crystal Palace	42	22	12	8	69	43	1.605	56	Elected to the new Football League Third Division
4	Cardiff City	42	18	17	7	70	43	1.628	53	Elected to the Football League Second Division
5	Plymouth Argyle	42	20	10	12	57	29	1.966	50	Elected to the new Football League Third Division
6	Queens Park Rangers	42	18	10	14	62	50	1.240	46	Elected to the new Football League Third Division
7	Reading	42	16	13	13	51	43	1.186	45	Elected to the new Football League Third Division
8	Southampton	42	18	8	16	72	63	1.143	44	Elected to the new Football League Third Division
9	Swansea Town	42	16	11	15	53	45	1.178	43	Elected to the new Football League Third Division
10	Exeter City	42	17	9	16	57	51	1.118	43	Elected to the new Football League Third Division
11	Southend United	42	13	17	12	46	48	0.958	43	Elected to the new Football League Third Division
12	Norwich City	42	15	11	16	64	57	1.123	41	Elected to the new Football League Third Division
13	Swindon Town	42	17	7	18	65	68	0.956	41	Elected to the new Football League Third Division
14	Millwall	42	14	12	16	52	55	0.945	40	Elected to the new Football League Third Division
15	Brentford	42	15	10	17	52	59	0.881	40	Elected to the new Football League Third Division
16	Brighton & Hove Albion	42	14	8	20	60	72	0.833	36	Elected to the new Football League Third Division
17	Bristol Rovers	42	11	13	18	61	78	0.782	35	Elected to the new Football League Third Division
18	Newport County	42	13	7	22	45	70	0.643	33	Elected to the new Football League Third Division
19	Northampton Town	42	12	9	21	64	103	0.621	33	Elected to the new Football League Third Division
20	Luton Town	42	10	10	22	51	76	0.671	30	Elected to the new Football League Third Division
21	Merthyr Town	42	9	11	22	47	78	0.603	29	Elected to the new Football League Third Division
22	Gillingham	42	10	7	25	34	74	0.459	27	Elected to the new Football League Third Division

Rules for classification: The system of using goal average to separate two teams tied on points was used up until the 1976-77 season. The points system: 2 points for a win, 1 point for a draw and 0 points for losing.

== Division Two ==
Southern Football League Division Two
- Season: 1919–20
- Champions: Mid Rhondda
- Promoted: none
- Relegated: Caerphilly (resigned)
- Matches: 110
- Goals: 416 (3.78 per match)

A total of 11 teams contested the division, six from the previous season and five new teams. All the teams in Division Two were from Wales.

Newly elected teams:

- Aberaman Athletic
- Abertillery
- Caerphilly
- Mardy
- Porth Athletic

Pos	Team	Pld	W	D	L	GF	GA	GR	Pts	Qualification
1	Mid Rhondda	20	17	3	0	79	10	7.900	37	Promoted and Transferred to Southern League Welsh Section
2	Ton Pentre	20	12	7	1	50	14	3.571	31	Promoted and Transferred to Southern League Welsh Section
3	Llanelly	20	10	5	5	47	30	1.567	25	Promoted and Transferred to Southern League Welsh Section
4	Pontypridd	20	10	3	7	33	29	1.138	23	Promoted and Transferred to Southern League Welsh Section
5	Ebbw Vale	20	7	7	6	39	40	0.975	21	Promoted and Transferred to Southern League Welsh Section
6	Barry	20	7	5	8	32	27	1.185	19	Promoted and Transferred to Southern League Welsh Section
7	Mardy	20	7	5	8	29	30	0.967	19	Promoted and Transferred to Southern League Welsh Section
8	Abertillery	20	6	5	9	29	40	0.725	17	Promoted and Transferred to Southern League Welsh Section
9	Porth Athletic	20	4	4	12	30	74	0.405	12	Promoted and Transferred to Southern League Welsh Section
10	Aberaman Athletic	20	4	3	13	28	48	0.583	11	Promoted and Transferred to Southern League Welsh Section
11	Caerphilly	20	1	3	16	20	74	0.270	5	Left league at end of season

Rules for classification: The system of using goal average to separate two teams tied on points was used up until the 1976-77 season. The points system: 2 points for a win, 1 point for a draw and 0 points for losing.
Note: Number of goals for and/or against is inaccurate.

== Football League elections ==
Cardiff City were the only Southern League club to apply for election to the Football League. They were successful and, along with Leeds United, replaced Grimsby Town and Lincoln City in the Football League Second Division.

Club	League	Votes
Leeds United	Midland League	31
Cardiff City	Southern League	23
Grimsby Town	Football League	20
Lincoln City	Football League	7
Walsall	Birmingham & District League	3

After the voting, 21 clubs remained in Southern League alongside Grimsby, having gained more votes than other non-elected clubs, were then elected into the newly created Third Division.
