= 1914–15 Southern Football League =

The 1914–15 season was the 21st in the history of the Southern League. Watford won Division One and Stoke finished top of the Division Two. Stoke were the only club to apply for election to the Football League and were successful. However, the United Kingdom declared war on Germany on 4 August 1914, thus entering World War I. The Football League and Southern League ceased operations until the war ended in November 1918. The next season would be 1919–20.

== Division One ==
Southern Football League Division One
- Season: 1914–15
- Champions: Watford (1st title)
- Promoted: West Ham United
- Relegated: Croydon Common (resigned)
- Matches: 380
- Goals: 1,131 (2.98 per match)

A total of 20 teams contest the division, including 18 sides from previous season and two new teams. Teams promoted from 1913–14 Division Two:

- Croydon Common
- Luton Town

Pos	Team	Pld	W	D	L	GF	GA	GR	Pts	Qualification or relegation
1	Watford	38	22	8	8	68	46	1.478	52	
2	Reading	38	21	7	10	68	43	1.581	49	
3	Cardiff City	38	22	4	12	72	38	1.895	48	
4	West Ham United	38	18	9	11	58	47	1.234	45	Elected to the 1919–20 Football League Second Division after World War I
5	Northampton Town	38	19	5	14	56	51	1.098	43	
6	Southampton	38	19	5	14	78	74	1.054	43	
7	Portsmouth	38	16	10	12	54	42	1.286	42	
8	Millwall	38	16	10	12	50	51	0.980	42	
9	Swindon Town	38	15	11	12	77	59	1.305	41	
10	Brighton & Hove Albion	38	16	7	15	46	47	0.979	39	
11	Exeter City	38	15	8	15	50	41	1.220	38	
12	Queens Park Rangers	38	13	12	13	55	56	0.982	38	
13	Norwich City	38	11	14	13	53	56	0.946	36	
14	Luton Town	38	13	8	17	61	73	0.836	34	
15	Crystal Palace	38	13	8	17	47	61	0.770	34	
16	Bristol Rovers	38	14	3	21	53	75	0.707	31	
17	Plymouth Argyle	38	8	14	16	51	61	0.836	30	
18	Southend United	38	10	8	20	44	64	0.688	28	
19	Croydon Common	38	9	9	20	47	63	0.746	27	Relegated to Division Two, but did not rejoin league after World War I
20	Gillingham	38	6	8	24	43	83	0.518	20	

Rules for classification: The system of using goal average to separate two teams tied on points was used up until the 1976–77 season. The points system: 2 points for a win, 1 point for a draw and 0 points for losing.

== Division Two ==
Southern Football League Division Two
- Season: 1914–15
- Champions: Stoke
- Promoted: Merthyr Town; Swansea Town; Brentford; Newport County; Stoke (to Football League); Coventry City (to Football League)
- Relegated: Stalybridge Celtic (resigned)
- Matches: 156
- Goals: 1,131 (7.25 per match)

A total of 13 teams contest the division, including 9 sides from previous season, two teams relegated from Division One and two new teams.

Teams relegated from 1913–14 Division One:

- Merthyr Town
- Coventry City

Newly elected teams:

- Stalybridge Celtic
- Ebbw Vale

Pos	Team	Pld	W	D	L	GF	GA	GR	Pts	Promotion or qualification
1	Stoke	24	17	4	3	62	15	4.133	38	Elected to the 1919–20 Football League Second Division after World War I
2	Stalybridge Celtic	24	17	3	4	47	22	2.136	37	Promoted to 1919–20 SFL Division One but left league after World War I to join the Lancashire Combination
3	Merthyr Town	24	15	5	4	46	20	2.300	35	Elected to 1919–20 SFL Division One after World War I
4	Swansea Town	24	16	1	7	48	21	2.286	33	Elected to 1919–20 SFL Division One after World War I
5	Coventry City	24	13	2	9	56	33	1.697	28	Elected to the 1919–20 Football League Second Division after World War I
6	Ton Pentre	24	11	6	7	42	43	0.977	28	
7	Brentford	24	8	7	9	35	45	0.778	23	Elected to 1919–20 SFL Division One after World War I
8	Llanelly	24	10	1	13	39	32	1.219	21	
9	Barry	24	6	5	13	30	35	0.857	17	
10	Newport County	24	7	3	14	27	42	0.643	17	Elected to 1919–20 SFL Division One after World War I
11	Pontypridd	24	5	6	13	31	58	0.534	16	
12	Mid Rhondda	24	3	6	15	17	49	0.347	12	
13	Ebbw Vale	24	3	1	20	23	88	0.261	7	

Rules for classification: The system of using goal average to separate two teams tied on points was used up until the 1976–77 season. The points system: 2 points for a win, 1 point for a draw and 0 points for losing.

== Football League elections ==
=== 1915 ===
Stoke were the only Southern League club to apply for election to the Football League. They were successful, and replaced Glossop North End, who received only one vote. However, the League ceased operations for the war after its AGM and did not resume until 1919.

Club	League	Votes
Leicester Fosse	Football League	33
Stoke	Southern League	21
South Shields	North Eastern League	11
Chesterfield	Midland League	8
Darlington	North Eastern League	4
Glossop North End	Football League	1

=== 1919 ===
Following World War I the Football League expanded from 40 to 44 clubs, creating four vacancies. Two Southern League clubs, Coventry City and West Ham United applied and were successful in the elections.

Club	League	Votes
Coventry City	Southern League	35
West Ham United	Southern League	32
South Shields	North Eastern League	28
Rotherham County	Midland League	28
Port Vale	Central League	27
Southport	Central League	7
Rochdale	Lancashire Combination	7
Chesterfield Town	Midland League	0
