= 1917–18 Brentford F.C. season =

English football team season

Brentford
1917–18 season
- Chairman: H. Jason-Saunders
- Secretary-Manager: Fred Halliday
- Stadium: Griffin Park
- London Combination: 6th
- Top goalscorer: League: Cock (27); All: Cock (27)
- Highest home attendance: 6,000
- Lowest home attendance: 1,500

During the 1917–18 English football season, Brentford competed in the London Combination, due to the cessation of competitive football for the duration of the First World War. In a patchy season, the Bees finished in mid-table.

== Season summary ==
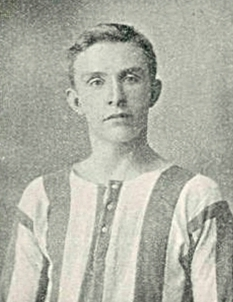
Former Brentford half back George Kennedy was killed on the Western Front in November 1917.

The wartime London Combination was streamlined for the 1917–18 season, with the clubs voting to expel Portsmouth, Watford, Southampton and Luton Town, which would reduce travelling expenses on Britain's congested railways. Despite the entry of the United States into the First World War in April 1917, Britain was still mired in war and manager Fred Halliday again had trouble securing players to play. Of Brentford's squad, goalkeeper Ted Price, defenders Jack Peart, Dusty Rhodes and forwards Albert Chester, Patsy Hendren and Henry White would appear in the majority of the matches during the season. Half back Bill Stanton, previously with Watford, was a rare wartime signing and he too would be regularly available.

Manager Fred Halliday struggled to field a settled side during the opening months of the season and Brentford suffered six defeats in eight matches between mid-September and mid-November 1917. In late November, Halliday pulled off a transfer coup, re-signing former Brentford forward Jack Cock as a guest from Huddersfield Town, to whom he had transferred in April 1914. Cock went on to score 27 goals in 23 appearances, which included two hattricks and a five-goal haul versus rivals Queens Park Rangers on the final day of the season. Henry White, frequently Brentford's top scorer during the First World War, supported ably with 17 goals. The season was notable for some high scoring wins (4–0, 6–2, 6–1 versus Queens Park Rangers; 5–0 versus Clapton Orient and 5–2 versus Tottenham Hotspur) and crushing defeats (7–1 versus Millwall, 6–1 versus Tottenham Hotspur; 8–3, 7–3, 7–2 versus West Ham United and 4–0 on two occasions).

A number of former Brentford players were killed during the season:

- Lance sergeant Richard Kemp, served with the King's Royal Rifle Corps and died at Dörnitz Altengrabow prisoner-of-war camp on 17 August 1917.
- Private James Greechan, died of wounds suffered during the Battle of Langemarck on 25 August 1917, while serving with the Highland Light Infantry.
- Company Sergeant Major George Kennedy DCM MM, died of wounds suffered during the Battle of Passchendaele on 16 November 1917, while serving with the Canadian Infantry Corps.
- Private William Kirby, killed at Polygon Wood during the Battle of Passchendaele on 3 October 1917, while serving with the Royal Engineers. He had appeared as a guest during the 1916–17 season.
- Bombardier William Allwright, served with the Royal Field Artillery and died of a stroke in Britain on 12 April 1918, having returned to convalesce.
- Private Harry Dutfield, served with the Leicestershire Regiment and was killed near Voormezeele, West Flanders on 6 June 1918.

== League table ==
=== London Combination ===
Pos	Team	Pld	W	D	L	GF	GA	GR	Pts
5	Arsenal	36	16	5	15	76	57	1.333	37
6	Brentford	36	16	3	17	81	94	0.862	35
7	Crystal Palace	36	13	4	19	54	83	0.651	30

Source: Football and the First World War

== Results ==
Brentford's goal tally listed first.

=== Legend ===
Win	Draw	Loss

=== London Combination ===
No.	Date	Opponent	Venue	Result	Scorer(s)
1	1 September 1917	Clapton Orient	H	1–0	Keenor
2	8 September 1917	Millwall	A	3–1	Hendren, Gregson (2)
3	15 September 1917	Tottenham Hotspur	H	5–2	Hendren (2), White (3)
4	22 September 1917	Chelsea	A	1–3	Hendren
5	29 September 1917	Crystal Palace	A	0–4	
6	6 October 1917	Arsenal	H	2–2	Gregson, Sloley
7	13 October 1917	West Ham United	A	3–8	Heydenrick, Green, Stanton
8	20 October 1917	Fulham	H	1–3	Chester
9	27 October 1917	Clapton Orient	A	3–1	White (2), Stanton
10	3 November 1917	Millwall	H	0–4	
11	10 November 1917	Tottenham Hotspur	A	1–6	Chester
12	17 November 1917	Chelsea	H	1–0	Hooper
13	24 November 1917	Crystal Palace	H	3–0	Cock (3)
14	1 December 1917	Arsenal	A	1–4	Cock
15	8 December 1917	West Ham United	H	3–2	Cock, Denyer, White
16	15 December 1917	Fulham	H	0–2	
17	22 December 1917	Clapton Orient	H	5–0	Edwards, White, Cock (2), Hendren
18	25 December 1917	Queens Park Rangers	H	1–1	Cock
19	26 December 1917	Queens Park Rangers	A	4–0	Hendren, Hanney, Stanton, White
20	29 December 1917	Millwall	A	1–7	Cock
21	5 January 1918	Tottenham Hotspur	H	2–3	White, Cock
22	12 January 1918	Chelsea	A	1–4	Cock
23	19 January 1918	Crystal Palace	A	4–3	Chester, E. Rhodes (3)
24	26 January 1918	Arsenal	H	3–2	Cock (2), White
25	2 February 1918	West Ham United	A	2–7	Corless, Chester
26	9 February 1918	Queens Park Rangers	H	6–1	White (2), Cock (3), Hooper (pen)
27	16 February 1918	Clapton Orient	A	1–1	Cock
28	23 February 1918	Millwall	H	3–1	Cock (2), Sloley
29	2 March 1918	Tottenham Hotspur	A	0–3	
30	9 March 1918	Chelsea	H	0–1	
31	16 March 1918	Crystal Palace	H	0–2	
32	23 March 1918	Arsenal	A	3–1	Cock, Chalmers, Cockerill (og)
33	29 March 1918	Fulham	H	2–3	Chester, Hooper
34	30 March 1918	West Ham United	H	3–7	White (2, 1 pen), Chester
35	1 April 1918	Fulham	A	6–4	Cock (2), Allwright, White (2), Chester
36	6 April 1918	Queens Park Rangers	A	6–2	Cock (5), White

- Source: 100 Years Of Brentford

== Playing squad ==
Players' ages are as of the opening day of the 1917–18 season.

Pos.	Name	Nat.	Date of birth (age)	Signed from	Signed in	Notes
Goalkeepers
GK	Ted Price	(England)	13 June 1883 (aged 34)	Croydon Common	1912	
Defenders
DF	Alf Amos	(England)	9 February 1893 (aged 24)	Old Kingstonians	1913	
DF	Jack Peart	(England)	13 October 1884 (aged 32)	Croydon Common	1916	
DF	Frank Price	(England)	28 February 1885 (aged 32)	Shepherds Bush	1914	
DF	Dusty Rhodes (c)	(England)	16 August 1882 (aged 35)	Sunderland	1908	Trainer
Midfielders
HB	Charles Allwright	(England)	11 June 1888 (aged 29)	Kingston upon Thames	1914	
HB	George Curtis	(England)	22 October 1888 (aged 28)	Kingston upon Thames	1914	
HB	Mick O'Brien	(Ireland)	10 August 1893 (aged 24)	Celtic	1915	
HB	Bill Stanton	(England)	9 May 1890 (aged 27)	Watford	1917	
Forwards
FW	Albert Chester	(England)	17 March 1886 (aged 31)	Millwall	1916	
FW	Patsy Hendren	(England)	5 February 1889 (aged 28)	Queens Park Rangers	1911	Played when his cricket commitments allowed
FW	Richard Sloley	(England)	20 August 1891 (aged 26)	Cambridge University	1914	Amateur
FW	Henry White	(England)	8 August 1895 (aged 22)	Whamcliffe Athletic	1913	Amateur
Guest players
GK	Fred Craig	(Scotland)	16 January 1891 (aged 26)	Plymouth Argyle	1917	Guest from Plymouth Argyle
GK	W. Griffiths	n/a	n/a	West Ham United	1917	Guest from West Ham United
GK	Jimmy Morris	(England)	n/a	Clapton Orient	1917	Guest from Clapton Orient
GK	Walter Scott	(England)	21 January 1886 (aged 31)	Worksop Town	1917	Guest from Worksop Town
DF	Fred Bullock	(England)	1 July 1886 (aged 31)	Huddersfield Town	1917	Guest from Huddersfield Town
HB	Sam Blott	(England)	19 June 1886 (aged 31)	Plymouth Argyle	1917	Guest from Plymouth Argyle
HB	Jimmy Brandham	(England)	22 January 1890 (aged 27)	Fulham	1918	Guest from Fulham
HB	Walter Frisby	(England)	8 March 1893 (aged 24)	Southampton	1917	Guest from Southampton
HB	Ted Hanney	(England)	19 January 1889 (aged 28)	Manchester City	1917	Guest from Manchester City
HB	E. Heydenrick	(South Africa)	n/a	Unattached	1917	Guest
HB	Bill Hooper	(England)	20 February 1884 (aged 33)	Southport Central	1917	Guest from Southport Central
HB	George Hunter	(England)	1 June 1885 (aged 32)	Manchester United	1917	Guest from Manchester United
HB	James Lockwood	(England)	20 February 1887 (aged 30)	Queens Park Rangers	1918	Guest from Queens Park Rangers
HB	Mansell	(England)	n/a	The Wednesday	1917	Guest from The Wednesday
HB	J. Mee	n/a	n/a	n/a	1917	Guest
HB	Sam Morris	(England)	20 October 1886 (aged 30)	Bristol Rovers	1917	Guest from Bristol Rovers
HB	Robert Nash	(England)	n/a	Unattached	1917	Guest
HB	Cecil Rhodes	(England)	1 April 1894 (aged 23)	Stockton	1918	Guest
HB	T. Roberts	n/a	n/a	Luton Town	1917	Guest from Luton Town
HB	T. Smith	n/a	n/a	n/a	1917	Guest
HB	Talbot	n/a	n/a	n/a	1918	Guest
HB	Maurice Woodward	(England)	12 October 1891 (aged 25)	Southend United	1917	Guest from Southend United
HB	Billy Yenson	(England)	1880 (aged 36–37)	Croydon Common	1917	Guest from Croydon Common
FW	Billy Brawn	(England)	1 August 1878 (aged 39)	Unattached	1917	Guest
FW	David Chalmers	(Scotland)	22 July 1891 (aged 26)	Grimsby Town	1918	Guest from Grimsby Town
FW	Jack Cock	(England)	14 November 1893 (aged 23)	Huddersfield Town	1917	Guest from Huddersfield Town
FW	Albert Corless	(England)	25 April 1886 (aged 31)	West Ham United	1918	Guest from West Ham United
FW	Jack Curtis	(England)	13 December 1888 (aged 28)	Stockport County	1917	Guest from Stockport County
FW	A. Davis	n/a	n/a	n/a	1917	Guest
FW	Bertie Denyer	(England)	9 April 1893 (aged 24)	Swindon Town	1917	Guest from Swindon Town
FW	James Dillimore	(England)	19 December 1894 (aged 22)	n/a	1917	Guest
FW	Billy Edwards	(Wales)	24 October 1895 (aged 21)	n/a	1917	Guest
FW	W. Elliott	n/a	n/a	n/a	1918	Guest
FW	Thomas Graham	(England)	20 July 1887 (aged 30)	Castleford Town	1917	Guest from Castleford Town
FW	John Green	(England)	4 October 1893 (aged 23)	Wolverhampton Wanderers	1917	Guest from Wolverhampton Wanderers
FW	Alf Gregson	(England)	2 March 1889 (aged 28)	Grimsby Town	1917	Guest from Grimsby Town
FW	W. Harrison	n/a	n/a	n/a	1917	Guest
FW	H. James	n/a	n/a	n/a	1918	Guest
FW	A. Jones	n/a	n/a	Unattached	1917	Guest
FW	Fred Keenor	(Wales)	31 July 1894 (aged 23)	Cardiff City	1917	Guest from Cardiff City
FW	W. Ramsay	n/a	n/a	n/a	1917	Guest
FW	B. N. Sidney	n/a	n/a	n/a	1917	Guest

- Sources: 100 Years of Brentford, Timeless Bees, Football League Players' Records 1888 to 1939

== Coaching staff ==
Name	Role
(England) Fred Halliday	Secretary-Manager
(England) Dusty Rhodes	Trainer

== Statistics ==
=== Appearances and goals ===

Brentford's highest appearance-makers in each position during the London Combination season.

Pos	Nat	Name	Total	
Pos	Nat	Name	Apps	Goals
GK	(England)	Ted Price	20	0
DF	(England)	Alf Amos	8	0
DF	(England)	Jack Peart	26	0
DF	(England)	Frank Price	1	0
DF	(England)	Dusty Rhodes	23	3
HB	(England)	Charles Allwright	3	1
HB	(England)	George Curtis	1	0
HB	(Ireland)	Mick O'Brien	2	0
HB	(England)	Bill Stanton	25	3
FW	(England)	Albert Chester	30	7
FW	(England)	Patsy Hendren	34	6
FW	(England)	Richard Sloley	1	0
FW	(England)	Henry White	24	17
Players guested during the season
GK	(Scotland)	Fred Craig	1	0
GK	n/a	W. Griffiths	1	0
GK	(England)	Jimmy Morris	11	0
GK	(England)	Walter Scott	3	0
DF	(England)	Fred Bullock	6	0
HB	(England)	Sam Blott	1	0
HB	(England)	Jimmy Brandham	9	0
HB	(England)	Walter Frisby	2	0
HB	(England)	Ted Hanney	10	1
HB	(South Africa)	E. Heydenrick	1	1
HB	(England)	Bill Hooper	22	3
HB	(England)	George Hunter	17	0
HB	(England)	James Lockwood	1	0
HB	(England)	Mansell	1	0
HB	n/a	J. Mee	1	0
HB	(England)	Sam Morris	5	0
HB	(England)	Robert Nash	1	0
HB	(England)	Cecil Rhodes	1	0
HB	n/a	T. Roberts	1	0
HB	n/a	T. Smith	1	0
HB	n/a	Talbot	1	0
HB	(England)	Maurice Woodward	7	0
HB	(England)	Billy Yenson	15	0
FW	(England)	Billy Brawn	1	0
FW	(Scotland)	David Chalmers	1	1
FW	(England)	Jack Cock	23	27
FW	(England)	Albert Corless	2	1
FW	(England)	Jack Curtis	3	0
FW	n/a	A. Davis	1	0
FW	(England)	Bertie Denyer	2	1
FW	(England)	James Dillimore	1	0
FW	(Wales)	Billy Edwards	10	1
FW	n/a	W. Elliott	1	0
FW	(England)	Thomas Graham	1	0
FW	(England)	John Green	9	1
FW	(England)	Alf Gregson	5	3
FW	n/a	W. Harrison	1	0
FW	n/a	H. James	2	0
FW	n/a	A. Jones	1	0
FW	(Wales)	Fred Keenor	9	1
FW	n/a	W. Ramsay	1	0
FW	n/a	B. N. Sidney	1	0

- Players listed in italics left the club mid-season.
- Source: 100 Years of Brentford

=== Goalscorers ===
Pos.	Nat	Player	Total
FW	(England)	Jack Cock	27
FW	(England)	Henry White	17
FW	(England)	Albert Chester	7
FW	(England)	Patsy Hendren	6
FW	(England)	Alf Gregson	3
HB	(England)	Bill Hooper	3
DF	(England)	Dusty Rhodes	3
HB	(England)	Bill Stanton	3
HB	(England)	Charles Allwright	1
FW	(Scotland)	David Chalmers	1
FW	(England)	Albert Corless	1
FW	(England)	Bertie Denyer	1
FW	(Wales)	Billy Edwards	1
FW	(England)	John Green	1
HB	(England)	Ted Hanney	1
HB	(South Africa)	E. Heydenrick	1
FW	(Wales)	Fred Keenor	1
Opponents			1
Total			81

- Players listed in italics left the club mid-season.
- Source: 100 Years of Brentford

=== Management ===
Name	Nat	From	To	Record				
Name	Nat	From	To	P	W	D	L	W %
Fred Halliday	(England)	1 September 1917	6 April 1918	36	16	3	17	44.44

=== Summary ===
Games played	36
Games won	16
Games drawn	3
Games lost	17
Goals scored	81
Goals conceded	94
Clean sheets	5
Biggest win	5–0 versus Clapton Orient, 22 December 1917
Worst defeat	7–1 versus Millwall, 29 December 1917
Most appearances	39, Patsy Hendren
Top scorer	27, Jack Cock

== Transfers & loans ==
Guest players' arrival and departure dates correspond to their first and last appearances of the season.

Players transferred in
Date	Pos.	Name	Previous club	Fee	Ref.
1 September 1917	HB	(England) Bill Stanton	(England) Watford	Free	
Guest players in
Date from	Pos.	Name	Previous club	Date to	Ref.
1 September 1917	DF	(England) Fred Bullock	(England) Huddersfield Town	6 October 1917	
1 September 1917	FW	(England) Jack Curtis	(England) Stockport County	24 November 1917	
1 September 1917	FW	(England) Alf Gregson	(England) Grimsby Town	6 October 1917	
1 September 1917	DF	(England) Ted Hanney	(England) Manchester City	End of season	
1 September 1917	HB	(England) George Hunter	(England) Manchester United	19 January 1918	
1 September 1917	FW	(Wales) Fred Keenor	(Wales) Cardiff City	23 March 1918	
1 September 1917	GK	(England) Jimmy Morris	(England) Clapton Orient	1 April 1918	
22 September 1917	FW	(England) John Green	(England) Wolverhampton Wanderers	5 January 1918	
22 September 1917	FW	A. Jones	Unattached	22 September 1917	
22 September 1917	HB	T. Roberts	(England) Luton Town	22 September 1917	
22 September 1917	GK	(England) Walter Scott	(England) Worksop Town	6 October 1917	
13 October 1917	GK	W. Griffiths	(England) West Ham United	13 October 1917	
13 October 1917	HB	(South Africa) E. Heydenrick	Unattached	13 October 1917	
13 October 1917	HB	J. Mee	n/a	13 October 1917	
13 October 1917	FW	B. N. Sidney	n/a	13 October 1917	
13 October 1917	HB	T. Smith	n/a	13 October 1917	
20 October 1917	HB	(England) Sam Morris	(England) Bristol Rovers	26 December 1917	
20 October 1917	HB	(England) Maurice Woodward	(England) Southend United	End of season	
3 November 1917	FW	(England) Billy Brawn	Unattached	3 November 1917	
3 November 1917	FW	W. Harrison	n/a	3 November 1917	
3 November 1917	HB	(England) Mansell	(England) The Wednesday	3 November 1917	
3 November 1917	HB	(England) Robert Nash	Unattached	3 November 1917	
10 November 1917	HB	(England) Sam Blott	(England) Plymouth Argyle	10 November 1917	
10 November 1917	GK	(Scotland) Fred Craig	(England) Plymouth Argyle	10 November 1917	
10 November 1917	FW	(England) James Dillimore	n/a	10 November 1917	
10 November 1917	FW	W. Ramsay	n/a	10 November 1917	
17 November 1917	FW	(England) Bertie Denyer	(England) Swindon Town	8 December 1917	
17 November 1917	FW	(England) Thomas Graham	(England) Castleford Town	17 November 1917	
17 November 1917	FW	(England) Bill Hooper	(England) Southport Central	End of season	
24 November 1917	FW	(England) Jack Cock	(England) Huddersfield Town	End of season	
24 November 1917	HB	(England) Billy Yenson	(England) Croydon Common	30 March 1918	
1 December 1917	FW	A. Davis	n/a	1 December 1917	
8 December 1917	HB	(England) Walter Frisby	(England) Southampton	15 December 1917	
15 December 1917	FW	(Wales) Billy Edwards	n/a	23 March 1918	
5 January 1918	FW	H. James	n/a	End of season	
12 January 1918	HB	(England) Cecil Rhodes	(England) Stockton	12 January 1918	
19 January 1918	HB	Talbot	n/a	19 January 1918	
2 February 1918	FW	(England) Albert Corless	(England) West Ham United	16 February 1918	
2 February 1918	FW	W. Elliott	n/a	2 February 1918	
16 February 1918	HB	(England) Jimmy Brandham	(England) Fulham	1 April 1918	
23 February 1918	HB	(England) James Lockwood	(England) Queens Park Rangers	23 February 1918	
23 March 1918	FW	(Scotland) David Chalmers	(England) Grimsby Town	23 March 1918	
Guest players out
Date from	Pos.	Name	To	Date to	Ref.
1917	HB	(Scotland) Jimmy Kennedy	(Scotland) Airdrieonians	1918	
