= 1918–19 Brentford F.C. season =

English football team season

Brentford
1918–19 season
- Chairman: H. Jason-Saunders
- Secretary Manager: Fred Halliday
- Stadium: Griffin Park
- London Combination: 1st
- London Victory Cup: Second round
- Top goalscorer: League: White (25); All: White (26)
- Highest home attendance: 15,000
- Lowest home attendance: 3,000

During the 1918–19 English football season, Brentford competed in the London Combination, due to the cessation of competitive football for the duration of the First World War. Buoyed by larger crowds after the Armistice, Brentford finished the season as champions of the London Combination.

== Season summary ==
11 members of the Brentford squad line up prior to a match at Griffin Park during the season (left to right – Peart, Price, McGovern, Cock, Morley, Hendren, Baker, Hanney, Keenor, Amos, White).

Brentford entered the London Combination for the fourth consecutive season in 1918–19, for what would become the final campaign of wartime football during the First World War. Just 11 contracted players would be available throughout the course of the season, which necessitated the use of a large number of guest players, the most notable of whom being future internationals Jackie Carr, Jack Cock and Fred Bullock (England), Fred Keenor (Wales) and Jack Doran (Ireland). Cock, Henry White and Ted Hanney all played in an England trial match on 14 April 1919.

A chronic lack of players saw Brentford win just one of the opening six matches of the season. The turnaround came when Jack Cock returned team after settling a dispute, which if left unsettled, would have led him to play for Fulham during the season. The Bees' forward line was immediately galvanised and the goals of Cock, Henry White and Fred Morley lead Brentford on a run of 11 wins in 14 matches in all competitions. The Armistice of 11 November 1918 brought the war to a close and attendances began to rise, which coupled with the club only having to pay its players £2 a week plus expenses, meant that Brentford ended the season with a profit of £2,000 (£89,300 in 2025).

Despite four draws in January 1919 and three losses in February (which included a second round defeat to Crystal Palace in the one-off London Victory Cup), a return to form and a 2–0 victory over nearest challengers Arsenal on 15 March put the Bees eight points clear at the top of the table with six matches left to play. Aided by additional goals from Patsy Hendren and Royal Navy serviceman Billy Baker, Brentford finished the season as champions, marking the first time the club had finished top of a division since winning the Southern League Second Division title in 1900–01. On 7 April, with three matches of the regular season to play, Brentford were invited to play a fundraising friendly match versus a 'Rest Of The Southern League XI' at The Den. Brentford lost the match 2–1.

One more former Brentford player died before the end of the war – Sapper Fred Alborough, who made three appearances as a guest in September and October 1918. He died of influenza on 31 October 1918, just five days after his final Brentford appearance. He had served with the Royal Engineers during the war. Former wartime guest players sergeant Dick Wynn and shoeing smith Billy Matthews died in circumstances related to their service in August 1919 and April 1921 respectively.

== League table ==
Pos	Team	Pld	W	D	L	GF	GA	GR	Pts
1	Brentford	36	20	9	7	94	46	2.043	49
2	Arsenal	36	20	5	11	85	56	1.518	45
3	West Ham United	36	17	7	12	65	51	1.275	41
4	Fulham	36	17	6	13	70	55	1.273	40
5	Queens Park Rangers	36	16	7	13	69	60	1.150	39

Source: Football and the First World War

== Results ==
Brentford's goal tally listed first.

=== Legend ===
Win	Draw	Loss

=== London Combination ===
No.	Date	Opponent	Venue	Result	Scorer(s)
1	7 September 1918	West Ham United	H	2–0	Stanton, Amos (pen)
2	14 September 1918	Tottenham Hotspur	A	1–1	Denyer
3	21 September 1918	Chelsea	H	0–0	
4	28 September 1918	Arsenal	A	1–1	White
5	5 October 1918	Crystal Palace	H	2–3	Morley, Peart (pen)
6	12 October 1918	Queens Park Rangers	A	1–2	Peart (pen)
7	19 October 1918	Millwall	H	4–2	White, Cock (2), Morley
8	26 October 1918	Clapton Orient	A	2–1	Cock (2)
9	2 November 1918	West Ham United	A	3–1	Wright, Morley (2)
10	9 November 1918	Tottenham Hotspur	H	7–1	Chalmers (2), Stanton, Cock (2), Morley (2)
11	16 November 1918	Chelsea	A	2–2	White, Cock
12	23 November 1918	Arsenal	H	4–1	Hendren (2, 1 pen), White, Cock
13	30 November 1918	Crystal Palace	A	4–0	Cock (2), White (2)
14	7 December 1918	Queens Park Rangers	H	5–1	White (5)
15	14 December 1918	Millwall	A	1–3	Hendren
16	21 December 1918	Clapton Orient	H	7–0	White (3), Cock (2), Keenor, Chester
17	25 December 1918	Fulham	H	2–1	White, Hendren (pen)
18	26 December 1918	Fulham	A	4–1	Hendren, Cock (2), White
19	28 December 1918	West Ham United	H	3–1	Morley, Keenor, White
20	4 January 1919	Tottenham Hotspur	A	1–1	Cock
21	11 January 1919	Chelsea	H	1–1	Cock
22	18 January 1919	Arsenal	A	3–3	Baker, White, Cock
23	25 January 1919	Crystal Palace	H	6–1	Doran (2), Cock (3), Pick
24	1 February 1919	Queens Park Rangers	A	0–0	
25	8 February 1919	Millwall	H	2–1	Hendren, Morley
26	15 February 1919	Fulham	A	2–3	Morley, Cock
27	22 February 1919	West Ham United	A	1–2	White
28	1 March 1919	Tottenham Hotspur	H	4–1	White (2), Morley (2)
29	8 March 1919	Chelsea	A	4–1	Morley, Baker (2), White
30	15 March 1919	Arsenal	H	2–0	White (2)
31	22 March 1919	Crystal Palace	A	3–2	Peart (pen), Baker, Morley
32	29 March 1919	Queens Park Rangers	H	1–1	Baker
33	5 April 1919	Millwall	A	0–3	
34	12 April 1919	Fulham	H	5–0	Cock (3), McGovern, White
35	18 April 1919	Clapton Orient	H	2–0	Morley, Baker
36	21 April 1919	Clapton Orient	A	2–4	White, Cock

=== London Victory Cup ===
Round	Date	Opponent	Venue	Result	Scorer(s)
R1	30 December 1918	Clapton Orient	H	3–2	Cock, White (2)
R2	17 February 1919	Crystal Palace	H	0–1	

- Source: 100 Years of Brentford

== Playing squad ==
Players' ages are as of the opening day of the 1918–19 season.

Pos.	Name	Nat.	Date of birth (age)	Signed from	Signed in	Notes
Goalkeepers
GK	Ted Price	(England)	13 June 1883 (aged 35)	Croydon Common	1912	
Defenders
DF	Alf Amos	(England)	9 February 1893 (aged 25)	Old Kingstonians	1913	
DF	Jack Peart	(England)	13 October 1884 (aged 33)	Croydon Common	1916	
DF	Dusty Rhodes (c)	(England)	16 August 1882 (aged 36)	Sunderland	1908	
DF	Bertie Rosier	(England)	21 March 1893 (aged 25)	Southall	1913	
Midfielders
HB	Tom McGovern	(Ireland)	11 November 1888 (aged 29)	Halifax Town	1913	
HB	Bill Stanton	(England)	9 May 1890 (aged 28)	Watford	1917	
Forwards
FW	Billy Baker	(England)	8 January 1894 (aged 24)	Unattached	1918	
FW	Albert Chester	(England)	17 March 1886 (aged 32)	Millwall	1916	
FW	Patsy Hendren	(England)	5 February 1889 (aged 29)	Queens Park Rangers	1911	Played when his cricket commitments allowed
FW	Fred Morley	(England)	1 March 1888 (aged 30)	Unattached	1918	
FW	Henry White	(England)	8 August 1895 (aged 23)	Whamcliffe Athletic	1913	
Guest players
GK	Jimmy Morris	(England)	n/a	Clapton Orient	1918	Guest from Clapton Orient
GK	Fred Pickup	(England)	n/a	Bury	1918	Guest from Bury
DF	Fred Bullock	(England)	1 July 1886 (aged 32)	Huddersfield Town	1918	Guest from Huddersfield Town
HB	Jimmy Brandham	(England)	1890 (aged 27–28)	Fulham	1918	Guest from Fulham
HB	John Green	(England)	September 1894 (aged 23–24)	Wolverhampton Wanderers	1918	Guest from Wolverhampton Wanderers
HB	Ted Hanney	(England)	19 January 1889 (aged 29)	Manchester City	1918	Guest from Manchester City
HB	J. James	n/a	n/a	n/a	1918	Guest
HB	Fred Keenor	(Wales)	31 July 1894 (aged 24)	Cardiff City	1918	Guest from Cardiff City
HB	Horace Parsons	(England)	23 December 1890 (aged 27)	Stourbridge	1918	Guest from Stourbridge
HB	Maurice Woodward	(England)	12 October 1891 (aged 26)	Southend United	1918	Guest from Southend United
HB	E. J. Wright	(England)	n/a	Hampstead Town	1918	Amateur, guest from Hampstead Town
FW	Fred Alborough	(England)	1892 (aged 25–26)	Unattached	1918	Guest
FW	Jackie Carr	(England)	26 November 1892 (aged 25)	Middlesbrough	1919	Guest from Middlesbrough
FW	David Chalmers	(Scotland)	22 July 1891 (aged 27)	Grimsby Town	1918	Guest from Grimsby Town
FW	Jack Cock	(England)	14 November 1893 (aged 24)	Huddersfield Town	1918	Guest from Huddersfield Town
FW	Bertie Denyer	(England)	9 April 1893 (aged 25)	Swindon Town	1918	Guest from Swindon Town
FW	Jack Doran	(Ireland)	3 January 1896 (aged 22)	Coventry City	1919	Guest from Coventry City
FW	J. Gillies	n/a	n/a	Unattached	1918	Guest
FW	Charles Hibbert	(England)	1894 (aged 23–24)	Uxbridge	1919	Guest from Uxbridge
FW	Harry Lappin	(England)	16 January 1879 (aged 39)	Unattached	1918	Guest
FW	W. Pick	n/a	n/a	n/a	1919	Guest
FW	Wilcox	n/a	n/a	n/a	1918	Guest
FW	Dick Wynn	(England)	1892 (aged 25–26)	Middlesbrough	1918	Guest from Middlesbrough

- Sources: 100 Years of Brentford, Timeless Bees, Football League Players' Records 1888 to 1939

== Coaching staff ==
Name	Role
(England) Fred Halliday	Secretary Manager
(England) Dusty Rhodes	Trainer

== Statistics ==
=== Appearances and goals ===

Brentford's highest appearance-makers in each position during the London Combination season.

Pos	Nat	Name	League		Victory Cup		Total	
Pos	Nat	Name	Apps	Goals	Apps	Goals	Apps	Goals
GK	(England)	Ted Price	26	0	2	0	28	0
DF	(England)	Alf Amos	13	1	1	0	14	1
DF	(England)	Jack Peart	25	3	2	0	27	3
DF	(England)	Dusty Rhodes	14	0	—		14	0
DF	(England)	Bertie Rosier	2	0	—		2	0
HB	(Ireland)	Tom McGovern	26	1	2	0	28	1
HB	(England)	Bill Stanton	29	2	2	0	31	2
FW	(England)	Billy Baker	26	6	2	0	28	6
FW	(England)	Albert Chester	5	1	—		5	1
FW	(England)	Patsy Hendren	27	6	2	0	29	6
FW	(England)	Fred Morley	31	14	2	0	33	14
FW	(England)	Henry White	31	24	2	2	33	26
Players guested during the season
GK	(England)	Jimmy Morris	5	0	—		5	0
GK	(England)	Fred Pickup	5	0	—		5	0
DF	(England)	Fred Bullock	12	0	—		12	0
HB	(England)	Jimmy Brandham	3	0	—		3	0
HB	(England)	John Green	1	0	—		1	0
HB	(England)	Ted Hanney	21	0	2	0	23	0
HB	n/a	J. James	5	0	—		5	0
HB	(Wales)	Fred Keenor	19	2	—		19	2
HB	(England)	Horace Parsons	1	0	—		1	0
HB	(England)	Maurice Woodward	13	0	1	0	14	0
HB	(England)	E. J. Wright	3	1	—		3	1
FW	(England)	Fred Alborough	3	0	—		3	0
FW	(England)	Jackie Carr	2	0	—		2	0
FW	(Scotland)	David Chalmers	5	2	—		5	2
FW	(England)	Jack Cock	25	24	2	1	27	25
FW	(England)	Bertie Denyer	4	1	—		4	1
FW	(Ireland)	Jack Doran	2	2	—		2	2
FW	n/a	J. Gillies	2	0	—		2	0
FW	(England)	Charles Hibbert	2	0	—		2	0
FW	(England)	Harry Lappin	2	0	—		2	0
FW	n/a	W. Pick	3	1	—		3	1
FW	n/a	Wilcox	1	0	—		1	0
FW	(England)	Dick Wynn	2	0	—		2	0

- Players listed in italics left the club mid-season.
- Source: 100 Years of Brentford

=== Goalscorers ===
Pos.	Nat	Player	LC	VC	Total
FW	(England)	Henry White	24	2	26
FW	(England)	Jack Cock	24	1	25
FW	(England)	Fred Morley	14	0	14
FW	(England)	Billy Baker	6	0	6
FW	(England)	Patsy Hendren	6	0	6
DF	(England)	Jack Peart	3	0	3
FW	(Scotland)	David Chalmers	2	—	2
FW	(Ireland)	Jack Doran	2	—	2
HB	(Wales)	Fred Keenor	2	—	2
HB	(England)	Bill Stanton	2	—	2
FW	(England)	Albert Chester	1	—	1
FW	(England)	Bertie Denyer	1	—	1
FW	n/a	W. Pick	1	—	1
HB	(England)	E. J. Wright	1	—	1
DF	(England)	Alf Amos	1	0	1
HB	(Ireland)	Tom McGovern	1	0	1
Total			94	3	97

- Players listed in italics left the club mid-season.
- Source: 100 Years of Brentford

=== Management ===
Name	Nat	From	To	Record All Comps					Record League				
Name	Nat	From	To	P	W	D	L	W %	P	W	D	L	W %
Fred Halliday	(England)	7 September 1918	21 April 1919	38	21	9	8	55.26|	36	20	9	7	55.56

=== Summary ===
Games played	38 (36 London Combination, 2 London Victory Cup)
Games won	21 (20 London Combination, 1 London Victory Cup)
Games drawn	9 (9 London Combination, 0 London Victory Cup)
Games lost	8 (7 London Combination, 1 London Victory Cup)
Goals scored	97 (94 London Combination, 3 London Victory Cup)
Goals conceded	49 (46 London Combination, 3 London Victory Cup)
Clean sheets	8 (8 London Combination, 0 London Victory Cup)
Biggest league win	7–0 versus Clapton Orient, 21 December 1918
Worst league defeat	3–0 versus Millwall, 5 April 1919
Most appearances	33, Fred Morley, Henry White (31 London Combination, 2 London Victory Cup)
Top scorer (league)	25, Henry White
Top scorer (all competitions)	26, Henry White

== Transfers & loans ==
Guest players' arrival and departure dates correspond to their first and last appearances of the season.

Players transferred in
Date	Pos.	Name	Previous club	Fee	Ref.
October 1918	FW	(England) Billy Baker	Unattached	Free	
1918	FW	(England) Fred Morley	Unattached	Free	
Players released
Date	Pos.	Name	Subsequent club	Join date	Ref.
March 1919	FW	(England) Albert Chester	(England) Tottenham Hotspur	1919	
April 1919	FW	(England) Billy Baker	Unattached		
April 1919	DF	(England) Jack Peart	(England) Arsenal	1919	
April 1919	HB	(England) Bill Stanton	(England) Rotherham County	1919	
Guest players in
Date from	Pos.	Name	Previous club	Date to	Ref.
7 September 1918	HB	(England) Jimmy Brandham	(England) Fulham	30 November 1918	
7 September 1918	FW	(Scotland) David Chalmers	(England) Grimsby Town	9 November 1918	
7 September 1918	FW	(England) Bertie Denyer	(England) Swindon Town	28 September 1918	
7 September 1918	FW	J. Gillies	Unattached	12 October 1918	
7 September 1918	GK	(England) Jimmy Morris	(England) Clapton Orient	26 October 1918	
14 September 1918	HB	J. James	n/a	16 November 1918	
14 September 1918	HB	(Wales) Fred Keenor	(Wales) Cardiff City	12 April 1919	
14 September 1918	FW	(England) Dick Wynn	(England) Middlesbrough	21 September 1918	
28 September 1918	FW	(England) Fred Alborough	Unattached	26 October 1918	
28 September 1918	GK	(England) Fred Pickup	(England) Bury	4 January 1919	
28 September 1918	HB	(England) E. J. Wright	(England) Hampstead Town	2 November 1918	
5 October 1918	FW	(England) Harry Lappin	Unattached	5 October 1918	
5 October 1918	HB	(England) Horace Parsons	Stourbridge	5 October 1918	
5 October 1918	FW	Wilcox	n/a	5 October 1918	
5 October 1918	HB	(England) Maurice Woodward	(England) Southend United	End of season	
19 October 1918	FW	(England) Jack Cock	(England) Huddersfield Town	End of season	
26 October 1918	FB	(England) Fred Bullock	(England) Huddersfield Town	15 March 1919	
30 November 1918	HB	(England) John Green	(England) Wolverhampton Wanderers	30 November 1918	
7 December 1918	HB	(England) Ted Hanney	(England) Manchester City	End of season	
25 January 1919	FW	(Ireland) Jack Doran	(England) Coventry City	22 February 1919	
25 January 1919	FW	(England) Charles Hibbert	(England) Uxbridge	22 February 1919	
25 January 1919	FW	W. Pick	n/a	End of season	
18 April 1919	FW	(England) Jackie Carr	(England) Middlesbrough	End of season	
Guest players out
Date from	Pos.	Name	To	Date to	Ref.
1918	HB	(Scotland) Jimmy Kennedy	(Scotland) St Mirren	1918	
