= Hendren =

Hendren may refer to:

- Hendren mountain in Kurdistan, Iraq, (also known as Handren)
- Hendren (surname)
- Hendren, Wisconsin, a town
- Hendren v. Campbell, a court case
