= Billy Baker (footballer, born 1894) =

English footballer

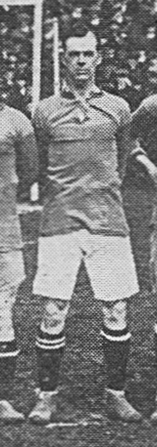
- Baker lining up for Brentford in 1919.

Personal information
- Full name: Arthur Lewis Baker
- Date of birth: 8 January 1894
- Place of birth: Plumstead, England
- Date of death: March 1972 (aged 78)
- Place of death: Merton, England
- Position: Outside left

Senior career*
Years	Team	Apps	(Gls)
1918–1919	Brentford	26	(6)
1920–1921	Brentford	4	(0)
1921	Manchester City	0	(0)
1922	Hampstead Town	2	(0)
- * Club domestic league appearances and goals

Arthur Lewis Baker (8 January 1894 – March 1972) was an English professional footballer who played in the Football League for Brentford as an outside left.

== Career ==
A Royal Navy regular with no experience of professional football, Baker signed for London Combination club Brentford in the autumn of 1918. His performances on the wing were such that he forced cricket/football star Patsy Hendren to switch to the other flank in order to stay in the team. Baker was a part of the team which won the London Combination title in the 1918–19 season, but his Navy duties took him away from Griffin Park after the season. Baker re-registered with Brentford on 15 October 1920, during the club's first season in the Football League. He made four appearances, but the club declined to buy him out of the Navy. He transferred to First Division club Manchester City in February 1920, but failed to make an appearance. Baker dropped into non-League football to sign for Athenian League club Hampstead Town briefly in 1922.

== Personal life ==
Baker joined the Royal Navy prior to the First World War.

== Honours ==
Brentford

- London Combination: 1918–19

== Career statistics ==
Appearances and goals by club, season and competition
Club	Season	League			FA Cup		Other		Total	
Club	Season	Division	Apps	Goals	Apps	Goals	Apps	Goals	Apps	Goals
Brentford	1920–21	Third Division	4	0	0	0	—		4	0
Hampstead Town	1922–23	Athenian League	2	0	0	0	2 (Note: Appearances in London Challenge Cup)	2	4	2
Career total			6	0	0	0	2	2	8	2
