= John Peart =

John Peart or Jack Peart may refer to:

- Jack Peart (John George Peart, 1888–1948), English football centre forward
- Jack Peart (footballer, born 1884) (John Charles Peart, 1884–1965), English football full back
- John Peart (artist) (1945/1946–2013), Australian artist
