= Fred Morley (footballer) =

English footballer

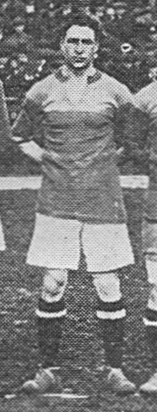
- Morley with Brentford in 1919

Personal information
- Full name: Frederick Morley
- Date of birth: 1 March 1888
- Place of birth: Burslem, England
- Date of death: 4 June 1970 (aged 82)
- Place of death: Bristol, Rhode Island, United States
- Position: Inside forward

Senior career*
| Years | Team | Apps | (Gls) |
| 1909 | Reading | | |
| 1909–1912 | Blackpool | 80 | (22) |
| 1913–1915 | Goole Town | | |
| 1918–1921 | Brentford | 48 | (8) |
| 1921–1922 | Philadelphia Field Club | 21 | (6) |
| 1922–1923 | J&P Coats | 19 | (1) |
| 1923–1927 | Fall River | 80 | (17) |
| 1928–1929 | J&P Coats | 2 | (0) |

Managerial career
- Fall River
- * Club domestic league appearances and goals

Frederick Morley (1 March 1888 – 4 June 1970) was an English professional football inside forward who began his career in England before finishing it in the American Soccer League. He was born in Burslem, England.

== Career ==
Morley began his career with Reading of the Southern League. In 1909, he transferred to Blackpool, then in the Second Division. He saw time in eighty league games before leaving the team in 1912. There is a six-year gap in his career records as he is then shown signing with Brentford in August 1918. In March 1921, Morley injured his knee. Trainers informed him it was most likely a career-ending injury. Morley left England and moved to the United States. That Fall, he signed with Philadelphia Field Club of the American Soccer League. Philadelphia was created when Bethlehem Steel moved to Philadelphia for the inaugural ASL season. A powerhouse team, Philadelphia took the league championship, but the ownership moved it back to Bethlehem at the end of the season. Morley moved to J&P Coats for one season before joined the Fall River in 1923. During his four seasons in Fall River, Morley and his teammates won three league titles and two National Challenge Cup titles. While Morley was never a prolific goal scorer, in the 1924 National Challenge Cup final, he scored two goals as the 'Marksmen' defeated St. Louis Vesper Buick 4–2. Morley's career records have another gap between 1927 and 1928 when he is not listed with any team. In 1928, he signed with J&P Coats, but played only two games before retiring. Following his retirement, he coached the Fall River

== Personal life ==
Morley served in the Royal Garrison Artillery during the First World War.

== Honours ==
Brentford

- London Combination: 1918–19
