= Bertie Rosier =

English footballer

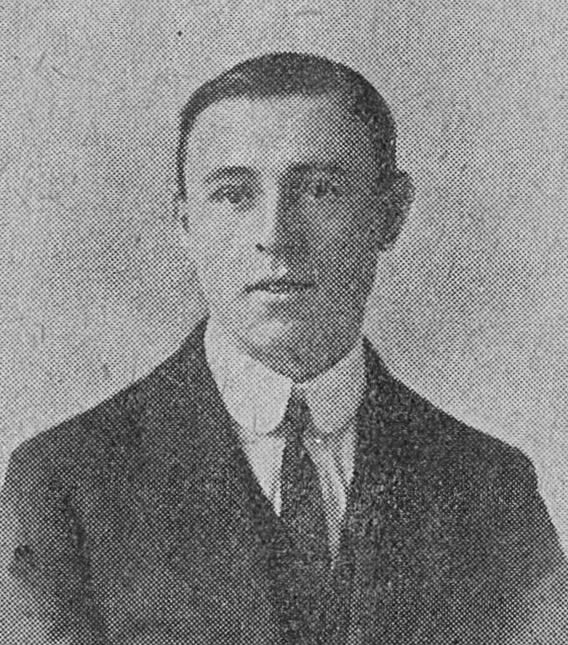
- Rosier while with Brentford in 1920.

Personal information
- Full name: Herbert Leonard Rosier
- Date of birth: 21 March 1893
- Place of birth: Hanwell, England
- Date of death: 14 February 1939 (aged 45)
- Place of death: Brentford, England
- Height: 5 ft 6 in (1.68 m)
- Position: Left back

Senior career*
Years	Team	Apps	(Gls)
1911–1912	Hanwell North End		
1912–1913	Uxbridge		
1913	Southall		
1913–1923	Brentford	119	(0)
1923–1927	Clapton Orient	136	(1)
1927–1928	Southend United	41	(0)
1928–1930	Fulham	52	(0)
- Folkestone
- * Club domestic league appearances and goals

Herbert Leonard Rosier (21 March 1893 – 1 March 1939) was an English professional footballer who played as a left back in the Football League for Brentford, Clapton Orient, Southend United and Fulham.

== Career ==
Rosier began his career with non-League clubs Hanwell North End, Uxbridge and Southall, before moving to Southern League Second Division club Brentford alongside his brother in 1913. A left back, Rosier's progress was halted by the outbreak of the First World War in 1914 and he enlisted to fight. After the armistice, Rosier returned to Brentford and played in the 1918–19 London Combination title-winning team. After Brentford's election to the Third Division in 1920, Rosier made his Football League debut for the club in a 3–0 defeat to Exeter City on 28 August 1920. By the time of his departure from Griffin Park in February 1923, Rosier had made 127 appearances. He later played for Clapton Orient, Southend United, Fulham and Folkestone.

== Personal ==
During the First World War, Rosier and his brother, Alfred, served with the Royal Sussex Regiment and both were captured by the Germans in July 1917 near Monchy-le-Preux. Both brothers were interned in prisoner of war camps in Douai, Dülmen and Münster before being repatriated in November 1918. Rosier held the rank of private.

== Career statistics ==
Appearances and goals by club, season and competition
Club	Season	League			FA Cup		Total	
Club	Season	Division	Apps	Goals	Apps	Goals	Apps	Goals
Brentford	1914–15	Southern League Second Division	1	0	0	0	1	0
Brentford	1919–20	Southern League First Division	26	0	1	0	27	0
Brentford	1920–21	Third Division	34	0	1	0	35	0
Brentford	1921–22	Third Division South	34	0	3	0	37	0
Brentford	1922–23	Third Division South	24	0	3	0	27	0
Brentford	Total		119	0	8	0	127	0
Southend United	1927–28	Third Division South	41	0	1	0	42	0
Career total			160	0	9	0	169	0

== Honours ==
Brentford

- London Combination: 1918–19
