= Hendren (surname) =

Hendren is a surname. Notable people with the surname include:

- Bob Hendren (1923–1999), American footballer
- Denis Hendren (1882–1962), English cricketer, brother of Patsy
- James Hendren (footballer) (1885–1915), Scottish footballer
- Jim Hendren (born 1963), member of the Arkansas State Senate and son of former State Senator Kim Hendren
- Kim Hendren (born 1938), current member of the Arkansas House of Representatives and former member of the Arkansas State Senate
- Patsy Hendren (1889–1962), English cricketer, brother of Denis
