= Harry Cockerill =

Harry Cockerill may refer to:

- Harry Cockerill (politician)
- Harry Cockerill (footballer)
