= Bill Stanton (footballer) =

English footballer

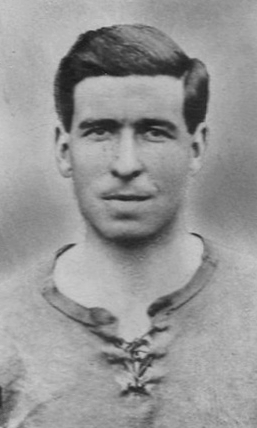
- Stanton while with Millwall in 1921.

Personal information
- Full name: William Waymark Stanton
- Date of birth: 9 May 1890
- Place of birth: Old Ford, England
- Date of death: 1977 (aged 86–87)
- Place of death: Hackney, England
- Position: Wing half

Senior career*
Years	Team	Apps	(Gls)
1909–1910	Worksop Town		
1910–1911	Gainsborough Trinity	9	(0)
1911–1912	Worksop Town		
1912–1920	Rotherham County	27	(1)
1916–1917	→ Watford (guest)	28	(1)
1917–1919	→ Brentford (guest)	54	(5)
1920–1923	Millwall	50	(3)
- Llanelly
- * Club domestic league appearances and goals

William Waymark Stanton (9 May 1890 – 1977) was an English professional footballer who played as a wing half in the Football League for Millwall, Rotherham County and Gainsborough Trinity.

== Personal life ==
Stanton worked as a carpenter and joiner. He served as an Air Mechanic in the Royal Flying Corps (latterly the Royal Air Force) during the First World War.

== Career statistics ==
Appearances and goals by club, season and competition
Club	Season	League			FA Cup		Total	
Club	Season	Division	Apps	Goals	Apps	Goals	Apps	Goals
Millwall	1920–21	Third Division	24	1	1	0	25	1
Millwall	1921–22	Third Division South	35	2	5	0	40	2
Millwall	1922–23	Third Division South	1	0	0	0	1	0
Career total			50	3	6	0	56	3

== Honours ==
Brentford

- London Combination: 1918–19
