= Willard, Clark County, Wisconsin =

Willard, Wisconsin
- Unincorporated community
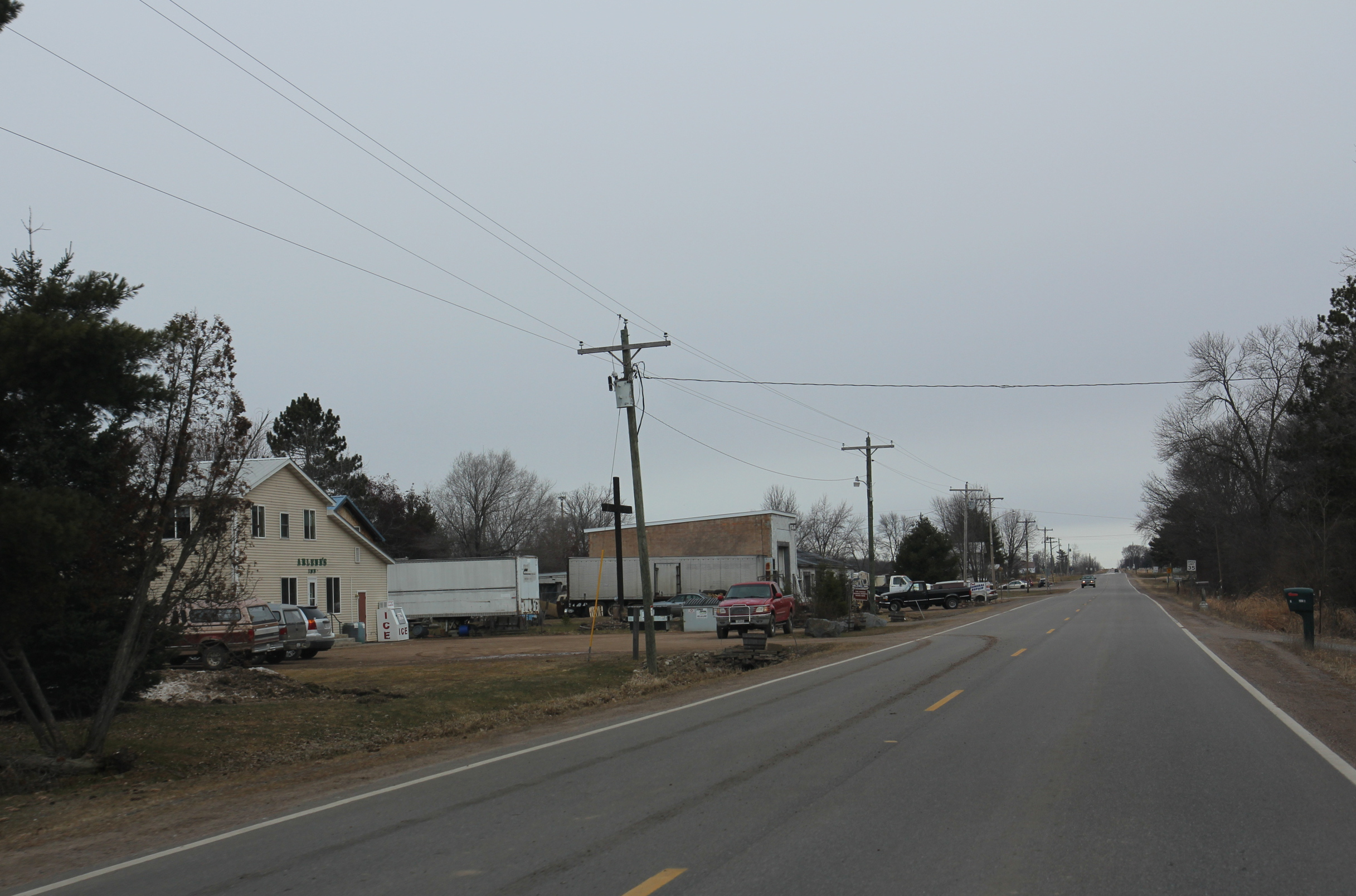
- Looking north at Willard on County G.

- Location within Wisconsin Location within the United States
- Coordinates: 44°44′06″N 90°43′10″W
- Country: United States
- State: Wisconsin
- County: Clark
- Town: Hendren
- Elevation: 1,181 ft (360 m)
- Time zone: UTC-6 (Central (CST))
  - Summer (DST): UTC-5 (CDT)
- ZIP code: 54493
- Area codes: 715 & 534
- GNIS feature ID: 1576756

Willard is an unincorporated community located in the town of Hendren, Clark County, Wisconsin, United States. Willard is 6.5 miles (10.5 km) west-southwest of Greenwood. Willard has a post office with ZIP code 54493.

== History ==
The post office at Willard, and in turn the settlement itself, was named after Willard Foster (1876–1945), the youngest son of Nathaniel Caldwell Foster (1834–1923). Foster established the Foster Lumber Company in Fairchild, Wisconsin, and the company founded Willard in 1911.

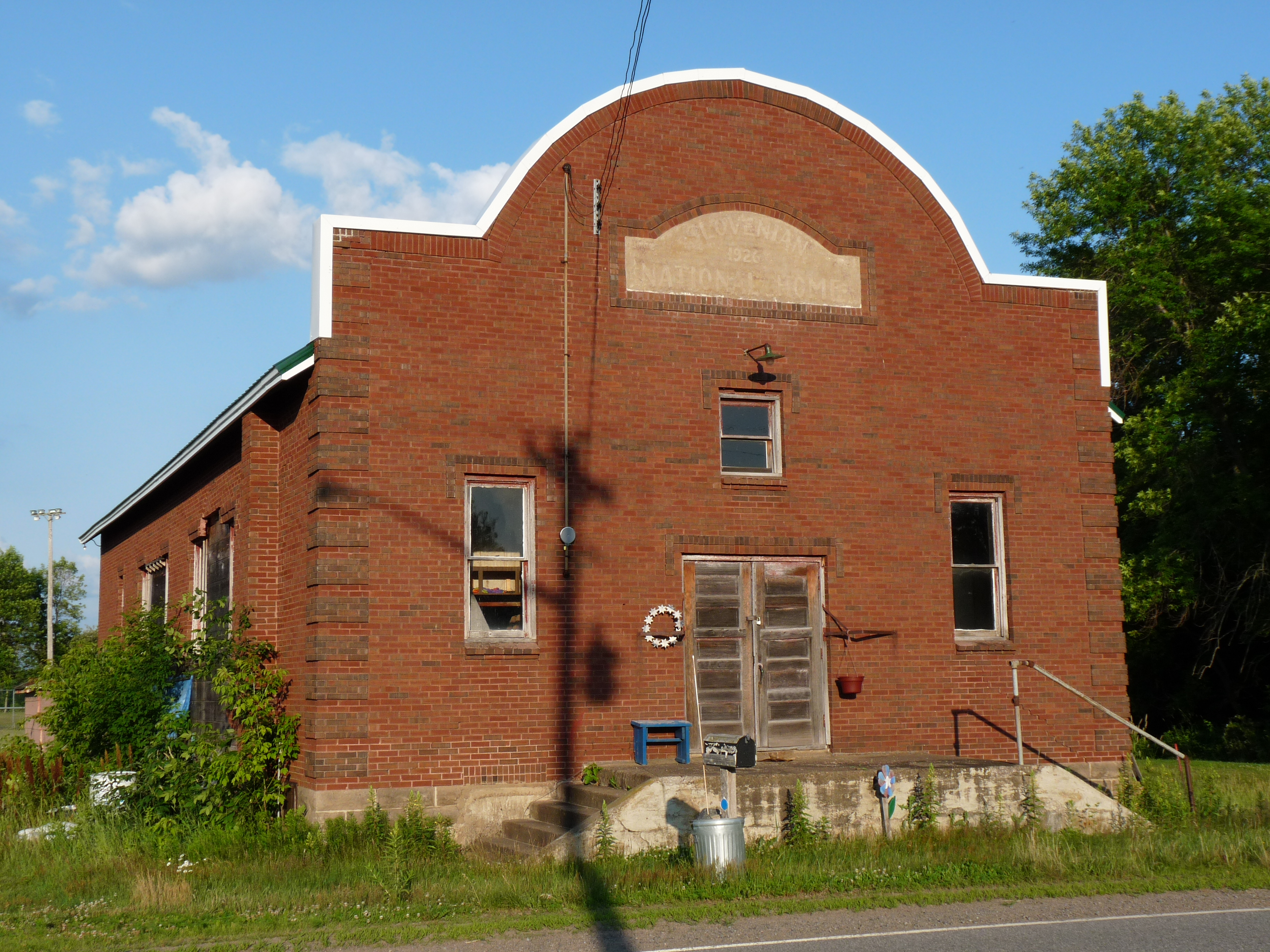
1926 Slovenian National Home hall, in 2023

The 1918 History of Clark County described Willard like this:

Willard is a thriving place on the Fairchild & Northeastern [railroad], between Fairchild and Greenwood. It has two stores, a cheese factory, a boarding house, a Catholic Church and a school. A few years ago Ignatz Ceznic started to organize a colony of Slavs and kindred nationalities in the wilderness in the town of Hendren. Today that country is dotted with scores of prosperous farms, and the village of Willard is the market place for them. Mr. Ceznic had the backing of the Foster Lumbering Company, of Fairchild, in his work.

== Images ==
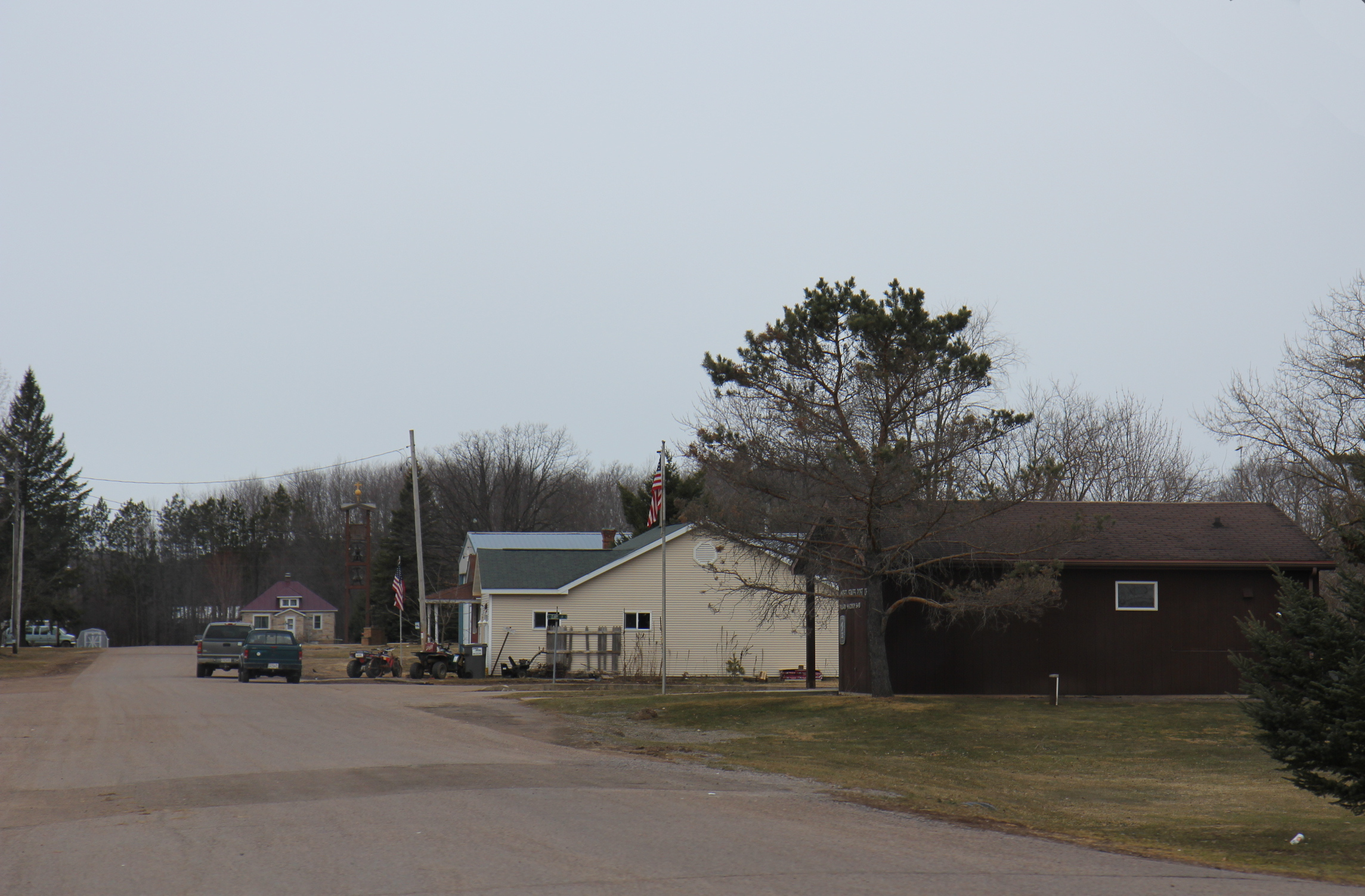
Looking west at Willard

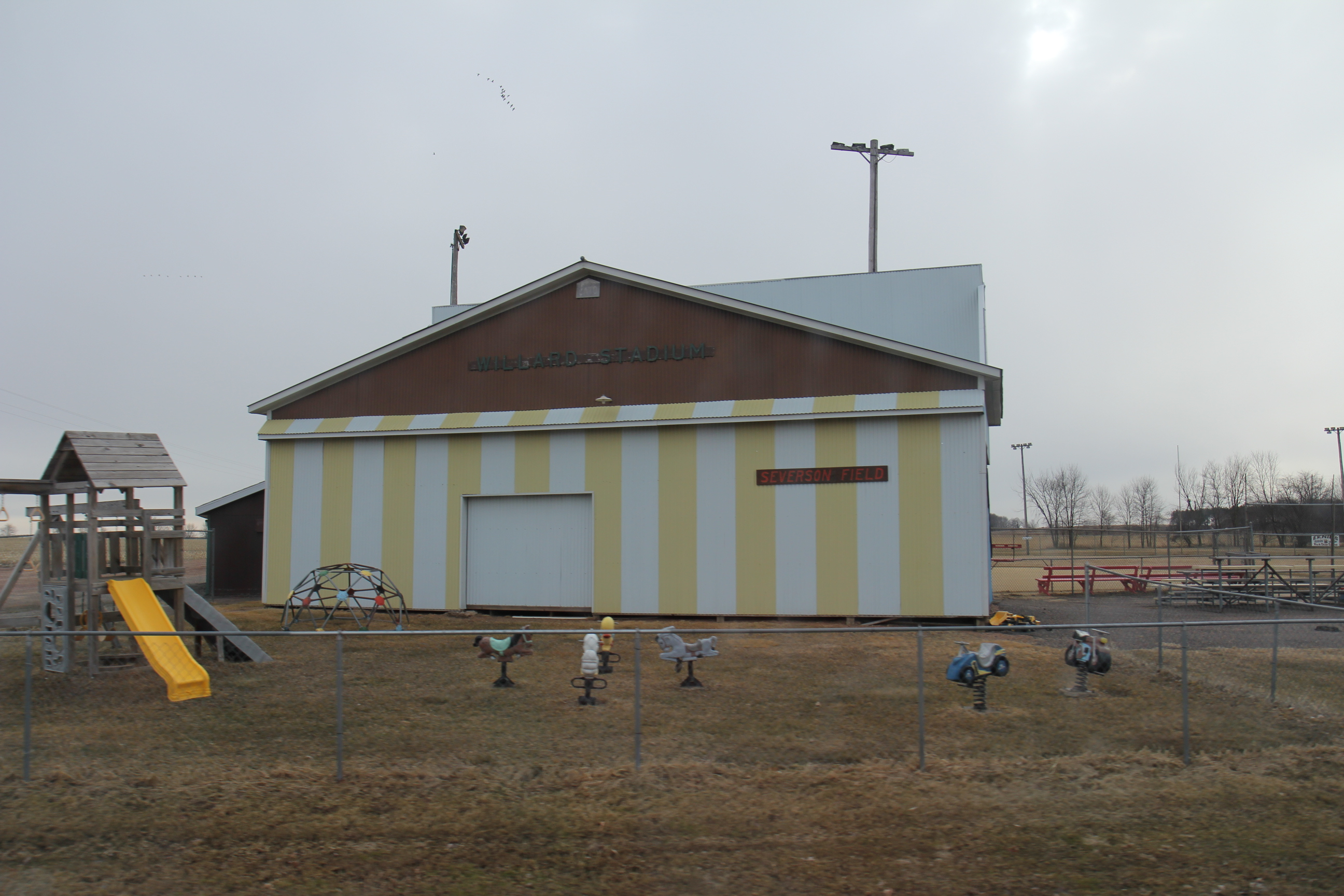
Willard Stadium

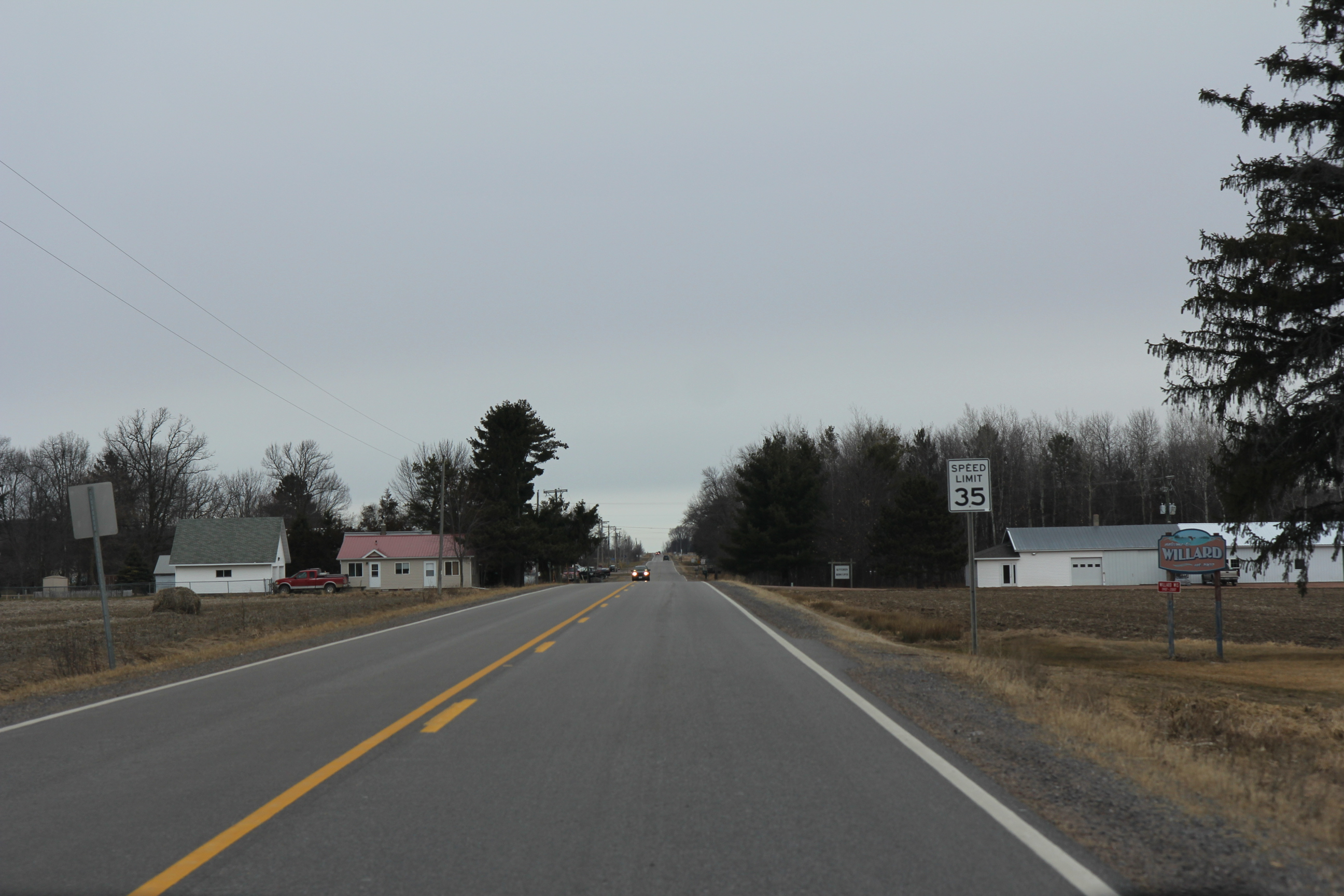
Entering Willard looking north

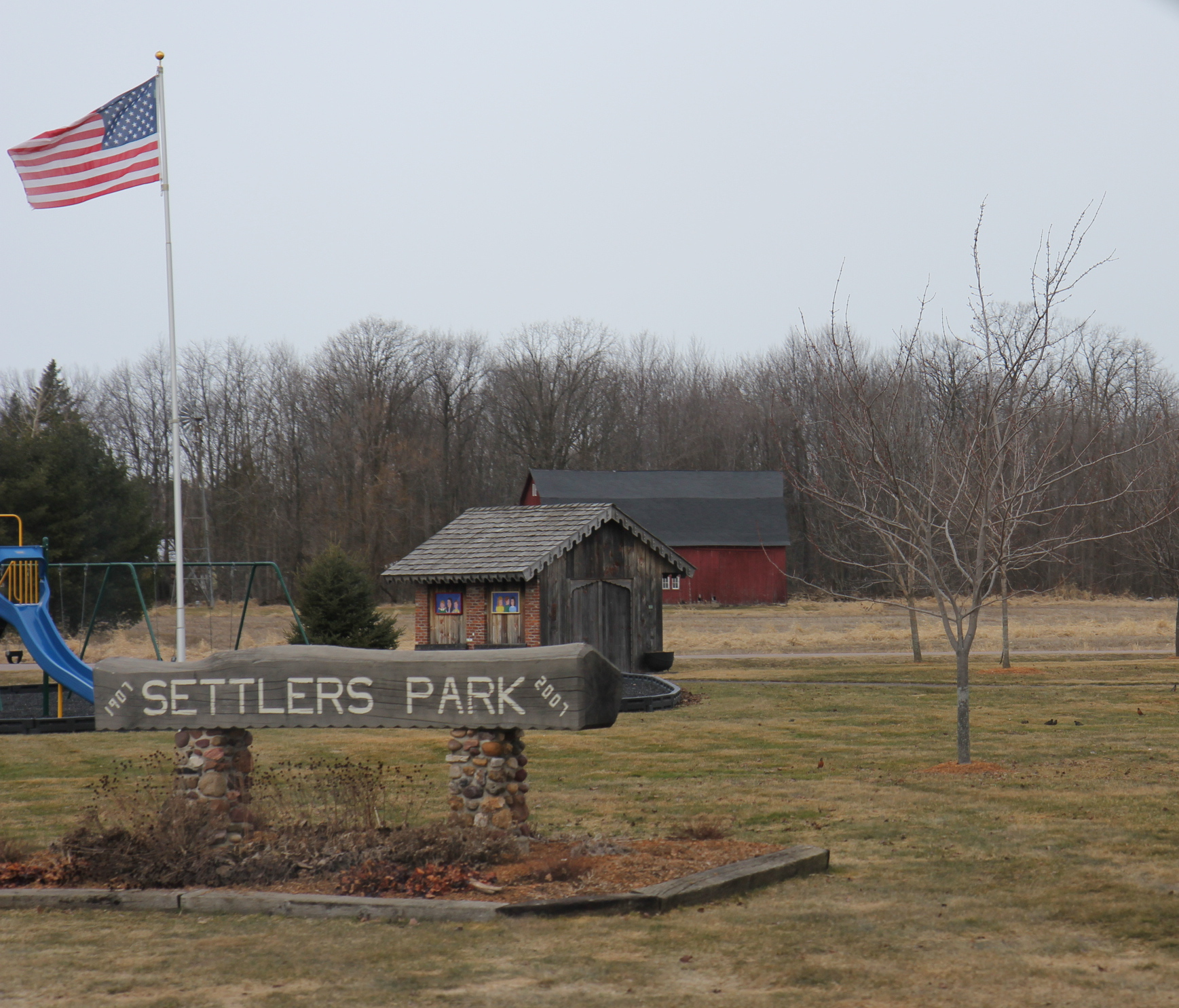
Settler's Park in Willard

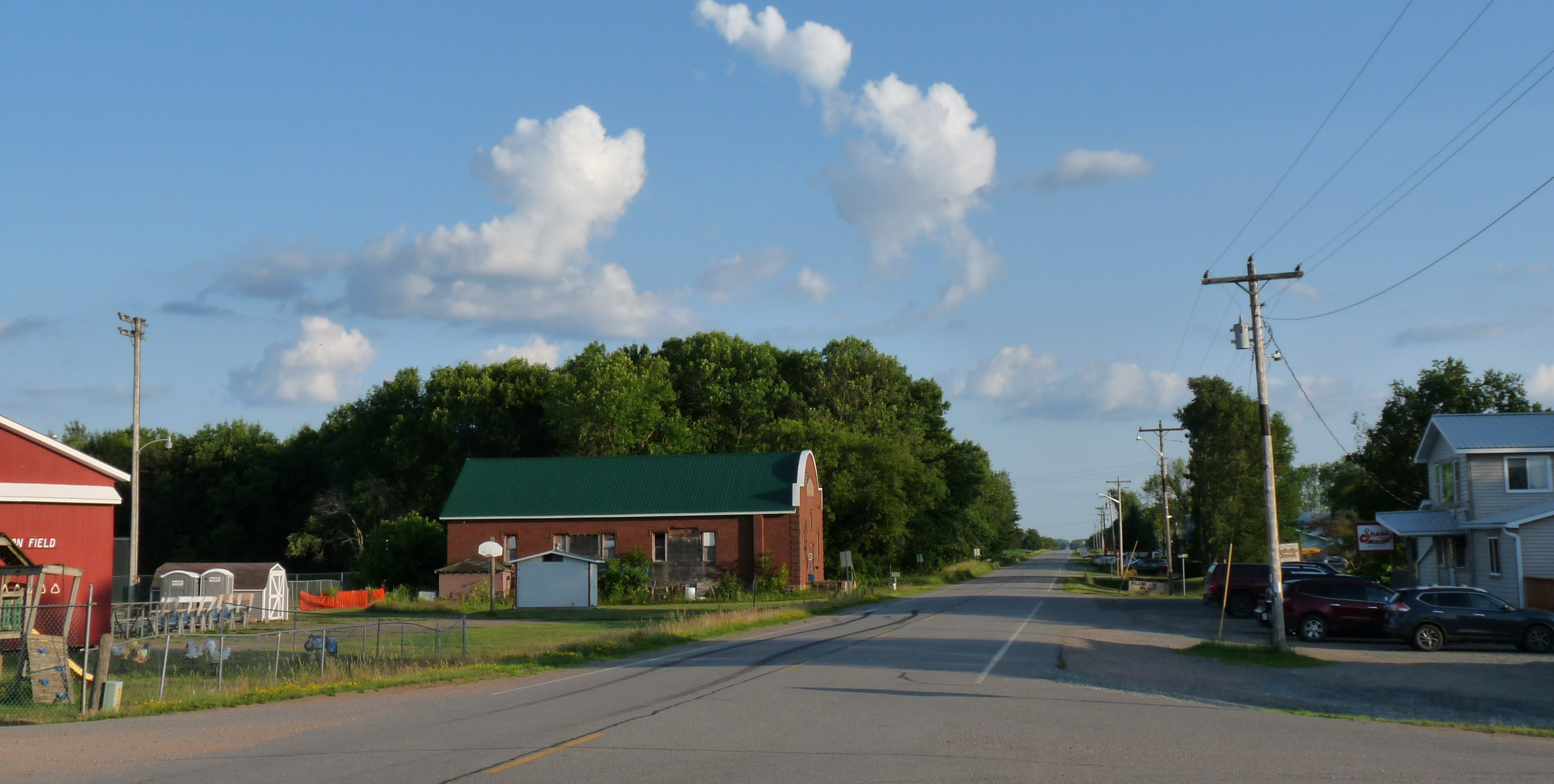
Looking south

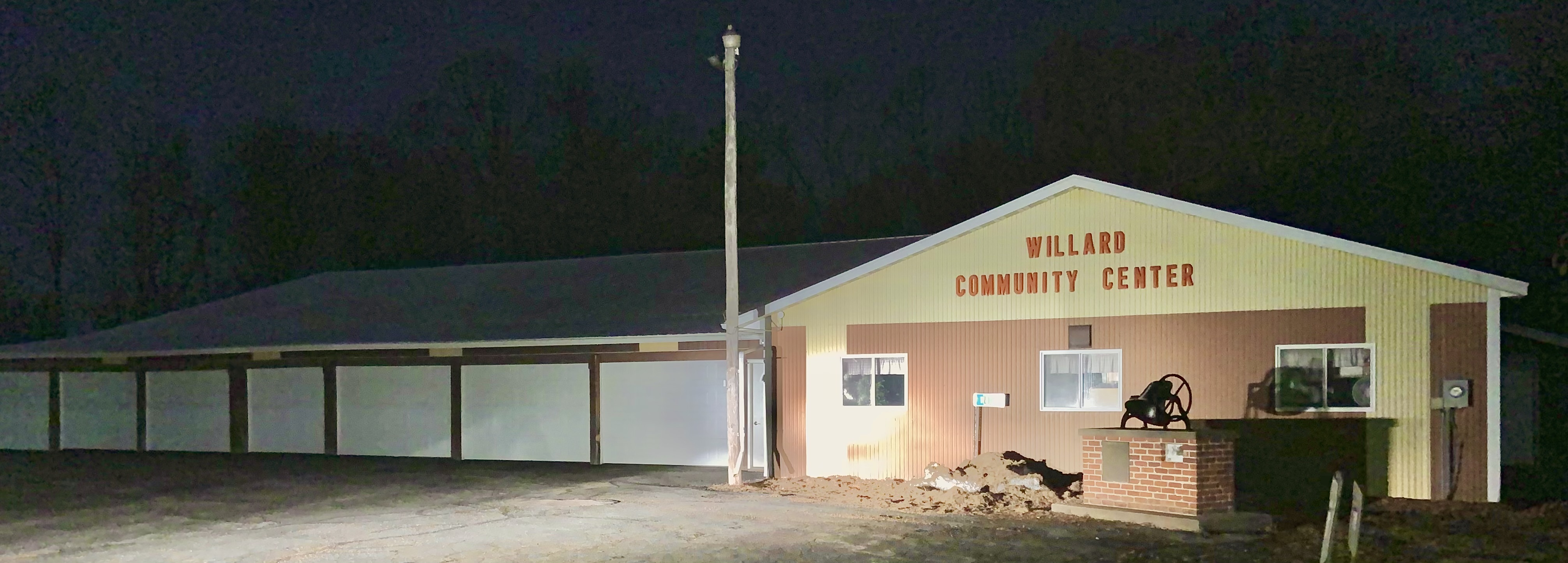
Town hall
