= Henry White (footballer, born 1895) =

English footballer

- White lining up for Brentford in 1919.

Personal information
- Full name: Henry Albert White
- Date of birth: 8 August 1895
- Place of birth: Watford, England
- Date of death: 27 November 1972 (aged 77)
- Place of death: Barrow Gurney, England
- Height: 5 ft 8 in (1.73 m)
- Position: Centre forward

Youth career
- 1913–1914: Whamcliffe Athletic

Senior career*
Years	Team	Apps	(Gls)
1914–1919	Brentford	18	(9)
1919–1923	Arsenal	101	(40)
1923–1925	Blackpool	70	(18)
1925–1926	Fulham	7	(1)
1926–1927	Walsall	39	(29)
1927–1929	Nelson	22	(15)
1929	Walsall	5	(0)
1929	Stafford Rangers		
1929–1930	Thames		
- Columbia
- * Club domestic league appearances and goals

Henry Albert White (8 August 1895 – 27 November 1972), sometimes known as Bert White, was an English footballer.

== Playing career ==
White was born in Watford, Hertfordshire, and first played for Brentford as an amateur, before World War I intervened. White served as a private in the Royal Fusiliers and as a lance corporal in the Royal Army Ordnance Corps while continuing to be on Brentford's books. He was discharged in February 1919 and returned to competitive football when he joined newly promoted Arsenal prior to the beginning of the 1919–20 season, making his debut in Arsenal's very first match after their promotion back to the First Division, against Newcastle United on 30 August 1919.

White soon made a name for himself as a reasonably prolific striker, and he was Arsenal's top scorer in 1919–20 with fifteen league goals, as the Gunners finished 10th in their first season back at the top; he impressed enough to play in a trial for England, although ultimately he never won a cap. After a quiet season in 1920–21 (scoring just 10 times), White scored 19 goals the following season, making him again Arsenal's top scorer, even though the club's poor defence meant they only finished 17th. However, in 1922–23 he (and Arsenal) suffered a slump in form and after being replaced by converted full back Bob Turnbull in November 1922, he was sold to Blackpool in March 1923. In all he played 109 games for Arsenal, scoring 45 goals.

After leaving Arsenal, White embarked on a journeyman's career; as well as playing for Blackpool he went on to have spells at Fulham, Walsall (twice), Nelson, Stafford Rangers and Thames before retiring in 1930. He was also a cricketer of some note, playing eight first-class matches for Warwickshire in 1923, though without success. He also played for his native Hertfordshire in the 1921 Minor Counties Championship. He died in 1972, aged 77.

== Honours ==
Arsenal

- London Challenge Cup (1): 1921–22
- Southend Hospital Cup (2): 1920–21, 1921–22
- Metropolitan Hospital Cup (1): 1920–21

Brentford

- London Combination (1): 1918–19
