= 1918–19 in English football =

Football in England
- Season: 1918–19

The 1918–19 season was the fourth and final season of special wartime football in England during the First World War.

== Overview ==
Between 1915 and 1919 competitive football was suspended in England. Many footballers signed up to fight in the war and as a result many teams were depleted, and fielded guest players instead. The Football League and FA Cup were suspended and in their place regional league competitions were set up; appearances in these tournaments do not count in players' official records.

== Honours ==
There were six regional leagues. The Lancashire and Midland Sections of the Football League were split into a principal tournament, consisting of a single league, and then a subsidiary tournament of four groups.

Competition	Principal Tournament winner	Subsidiary Tournament winner
Football League (Lancashire Section)	Everton	Blackpool (Group A); Oldham Athletic (Group B); Manchester City (Group C); Liverpool (Group D)
Football League (Midland Section)	Nottingham Forest	Sheffield United (Group A); Birmingham (Group B); Bradford Park Avenue (Group C); Hull City (Group D)
Midland Victory League	West Bromwich Albion	n/a
Northern Victory League	Middlesbrough	n/a
London Combination	Brentford	n/a
Bristol County Combination	Bristol Rovers	n/a

A championship playoff was held between Nottingham Forest and Everton, which Forest won 1–0 on aggregate.

== See also ==
- England national football team results (unofficial matches)
