= Sam Morris (footballer, born 1886) =

English footballer

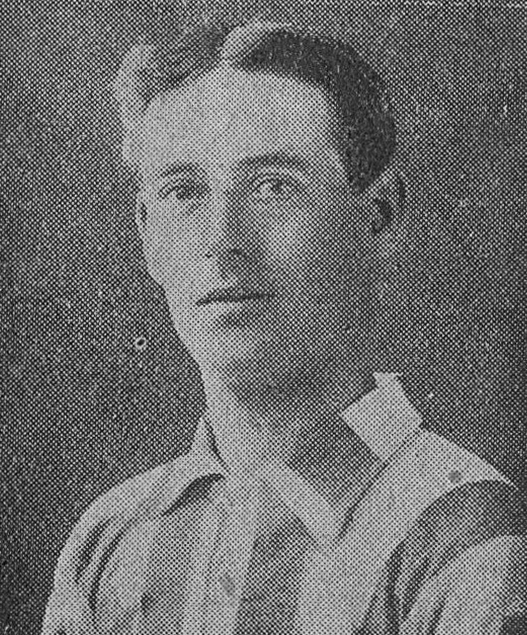
- Morris while with Bristol Rovers.

Personal information
- Full name: Samuel Herbert Morris
- Date of birth: 23 October 1886
- Place of birth: Handsworth, England
- Date of death: December 1969 (aged 83)
- Place of death: Paddington, England
- Position: Wing half

Youth career
- –1906: Perry Bar

Senior career*
Years	Team	Apps	(Gls)
1906–1907	Aston Villa	0	(0)
1908–1911	Queens Park Rangers	40	(2)
1911	Birmingham	0	(0)
1911–1919	Bristol Rovers	89	(0)
1916–1917	→ Clapton Orient (guest)	3	(0)
1917	→ Brentford (guest)	5	(0)
1919–1921	Brentford	63	(0)
- Maidstone United
- * Club domestic league appearances and goals

Samuel Herbert Morris (23 October 1886 – December 1969) was an English professional footballer who played in the Football League for Brentford as a wing half.

== Club career ==
=== Early years ===
Morris joined First Division club Aston Villa in 1906, but failed to make an appearance before departing the club at the end of the 1906–07 season. He moved to Southern League First Division club Queens Park Rangers in 1908. He remained at Loftus Road until joining divisional rivals Bristol Rovers in 1911, after a short spell with Second Division club Birmingham. Morris remained with Rovers during the First World War and left the club after the armistice, in 1919.

=== Brentford ===
Morris signed for Southern League First Division club Brentford in 1919, after having guested for the club during the war. He made 37 appearances during what would be the club's final season of Southern League football and was kept on for the club's debut Football League season. Morris had to wait until 9 October 1920 to make his Football League debut, which came in a 0–0 draw with Norwich City. He made 27 appearances during the 1920-21 season and departed Griffin Park in May 1921, having made 64 appearances for the Bees.

=== Maidstone United ===
After leaving Brentford, Morris dropped into non-League football to join Kent League club Maidstone United.

== Personal life ==
Morris served as a sergeant in the Middlesex Regiment's Football Battalion during the First World War. He was a motor car machinist by trade and later worked in Paddington as an ice rink foreman and ice skate grinder.

== Career statistics ==
Appearances and goals by club, season and competition
Club	Season	League			FA Cup		Total	
Club	Season	Division	Apps	Goals	Apps	Goals	Apps	Goals
Queens Park Rangers	1907–08	Southern League First Division	2	0	0	0	2	0
Queens Park Rangers	1908–09	Southern League First Division	23	2	1	0	24	2
Queens Park Rangers	1909–10	Southern League First Division	6	0	0	0	6	0
Queens Park Rangers	1910–11	Southern League First Division	9	0	1	0	10	0
Queens Park Rangers	Total		40	2	2	0	42	2
Brentford	1919–20	Southern League First Division	36	0	1	1	37	1
Brentford	1920–21	Third Division	27	0	0	0	27	0
Brentford	Total		63	0	1	1	64	1
Career total			103	2	3	1	106	3
