= Billy Edwards (footballer, born 1895) =

Welsh footballer (1895–1952)

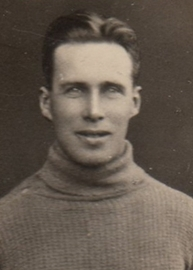
- Edwards while with Newport County in 1922.

Personal information
- Full name: William Frank Edwards
- Date of birth: 24 October 1895
- Place of birth: Builth, Wales
- Date of death: 4 June 1952 (aged 56)
- Place of death: Hereford, England
- Position: Outside right

Senior career*
Years	Team	Apps	(Gls)
–1912	Knighton Town		
1912–1913	Shrewsbury Town		
1913–1914	Brentford		
1914	Watford		
1914–1915	Llanelli		
1916–1917	→ Watford (guest)	28	(14)
1917	→ Fulham (guest)	6	(2)
1917	→ Queens Park Rangers (guest)	1	(0)
1917–1918	→ Brentford (guest)	10	(1)
1919–1920	Fulham	0	(0)
1920–1923	Newport County	79	(12)
1923–1926	West Ham United	37	(3)
1926–1927	Newport County	0	(0)
1927–1932	Hereford United	43	(24)
- * Club domestic league appearances and goals

William Frank Edwards (24 October 1895 – 4 June 1952) was a Welsh professional footballer who played in the Football League for Newport County and West Ham United as an outside right. He later represented Herefordshire at bowls and won the National Triples title in 1950.

== Personal life ==
Prior to his service in the First World War, Edwards worked as a motor driver. In July 1915, nearly a year after the outbreak of the First World War, Edwards enlisted in the Royal Flying Corps as an air mechanic 1st class. He was later promoted to the rank of leading aircraftman. After retiring from football, Edwards became a publican in Hereford and along with his brother, he served as a director of Hereford United.

== Career statistics ==
Appearances and goals by club, season and competition
Club	Season	League			FA Cup		Other		Total	
Club	Season	Division	Apps	Goals	Apps	Goals	Apps	Goals	Apps	Goals
West Ham United	1922–23	Second Division	1	0	0	0	—		1	0
West Ham United	1923–24	First Division	25	3	2	0	—		27	3
West Ham United	1924–25	First Division	7	0	0	0	—		7	0
West Ham United	1925–26	First Division	4	0	0	0	—		4	0
West Ham United	Total		37	3	2	0	—		39	3
Hereford United	1927–28	Birmingham Combination	15	12	0	0	2 (Note: Appearances in Birmingham Senior Cup)	1	17	13
Hereford United	1928–29	Birmingham & District League	16	10	2	1	2	1	20	12
Hereford United	1929–30	Birmingham & District League	6	2	0	0	1	0	7	2
Hereford United	1930–31	Birmingham & District League	5	0	4	0	0	0	9	0
Hereford United	1931–32	Birmingham & District League	1	0	0	0	0	0	1	0
Hereford United	Total		43	24	6	1	5	2	54	27
Career Total			80	27	8	1	5	2	93	30
