= Jack Doran =

Irish footballer

- Doran while with Brighton & Hove Albion in 1921.

Personal information
- Full name: John Francis Doran
- Date of birth: 3 January 1896
- Place of birth: Belfast, (Note: Carden & Harris's Albion A–Z and Joyce's Football League Players' Records give Doran's birthplace as Belfast, while Northern Ireland's Footballing Greats gives Dublin. However, a comment on that site apparently from a family member, citing the 1901 census, would confirm Belfast.) Ireland
- Date of death: 7 January 1940 (aged 44)
- Place of death: Sunderland, England
- Height: 5 ft 9 in (1.75 m)
- Positions: Centre forward; centre half

Senior career*
Years	Team	Apps	(Gls)
1912	New Brompton	0	(0)
1912–	Pontypridd		
- Newcastle Empire
1914–1915	Coventry City	1	(2)
1919–1920	Norwich City		
1920–1922	Brighton & Hove Albion	81	(54)
1922–1924	Manchester City	3	(1)
1924	Crewe Alexandra	18	(1)
1924	Mid Rhondda United		
1924–1925	Shelbourne		
1925	Fordsons		
1925–1927	Boston Town		

International career
1920–1922	Ireland	3	(0)

Managerial career
- 1930: Waterford United
- * Club domestic league appearances and goals

John Francis Doran MM (3 January 1896 – 7 January 1940) was a professional footballer who played three times for the Ireland national team. In club football, he scored 46 goals from 90 appearances in the Football League playing for Brighton & Hove Albion, Manchester City and Crewe Alexandra. He also played in the Southern League for Pontypridd, Coventry City, Norwich City, Brighton & Hove Albion (before their admission to the Football League) and Mid Rhondda United, in the Free State League for Shelbourne and Fordsons, and in the Midland League for Boston Town.

== Life and career ==
Doran was born in Belfast in 1896. His family moved to England, and the young Doran was on the books of Southern League clubs New Brompton and Pontypridd and non-League club Newcastle Empire before signing for Coventry City in May 1914. He scored twice in his only appearance for that club in the Southern League before enlisting in the Army in September. Doran went on to serve in the 17th Battalion of the Middlesex Regiment – the so-called Footballers' Battalion – and was awarded the Military Medal.

After the war, Doran had brief spells as a guest with Brentford and Newcastle United, before joining Southern League club Norwich City, under the management of his wartime commanding officer, Major Frank Buckley. By March 1920, he had scored 18 goals for Norwich, already enough to make him the club's top scorer for the season, when Charlie Webb, manager of Buckley's former club Brighton & Hove Albion, persuaded him to move to the south coast. In the ten remaining games, Doran scored ten goals, a total that gave him the rare achievement of being the top scorer of two clubs in the same season. The following year, when Albion and the other Southern League teams were absorbed into the new Football League Third Division, Doran's goalscoring continued. He was the club's top scorer, with 22 goals, and he began the 1921–22 season with 16 of the first 17 goals scored by the team, including two hat-tricks and five goals in a 7–0 defeat of Northampton Town. Such goalscoring attracted attention from bigger clubs, and after finishing the season as Albion's top scorer for the third time, he signed for Manchester City of the First Division.

Doran made only three appearances for Manchester City, scoring once, before the club attempted to convert him to centre half. He then moved back to the Third Division for a few months with Crewe Alexandra. Short spells followed with Mid Rhondda United in the Southern League. In 1924 he joined Free State League club Shelbourne. He scored the third goal as Shelbourne defeated Athlone Town 4–0 in the semifinal of the 1925 Free State Cup, and appeared on the losing side in the final. He also played for Fordsons in the Free State League before finishing his playing career with Boston Town in the Midland League. He then returned to Ireland where he coached Waterford United.

After retiring from football, he became a publican in the north-east of England, and died in Sunderland of the effects of tuberculosis, aged 44.
