= Hendren, Wisconsin =

- Town
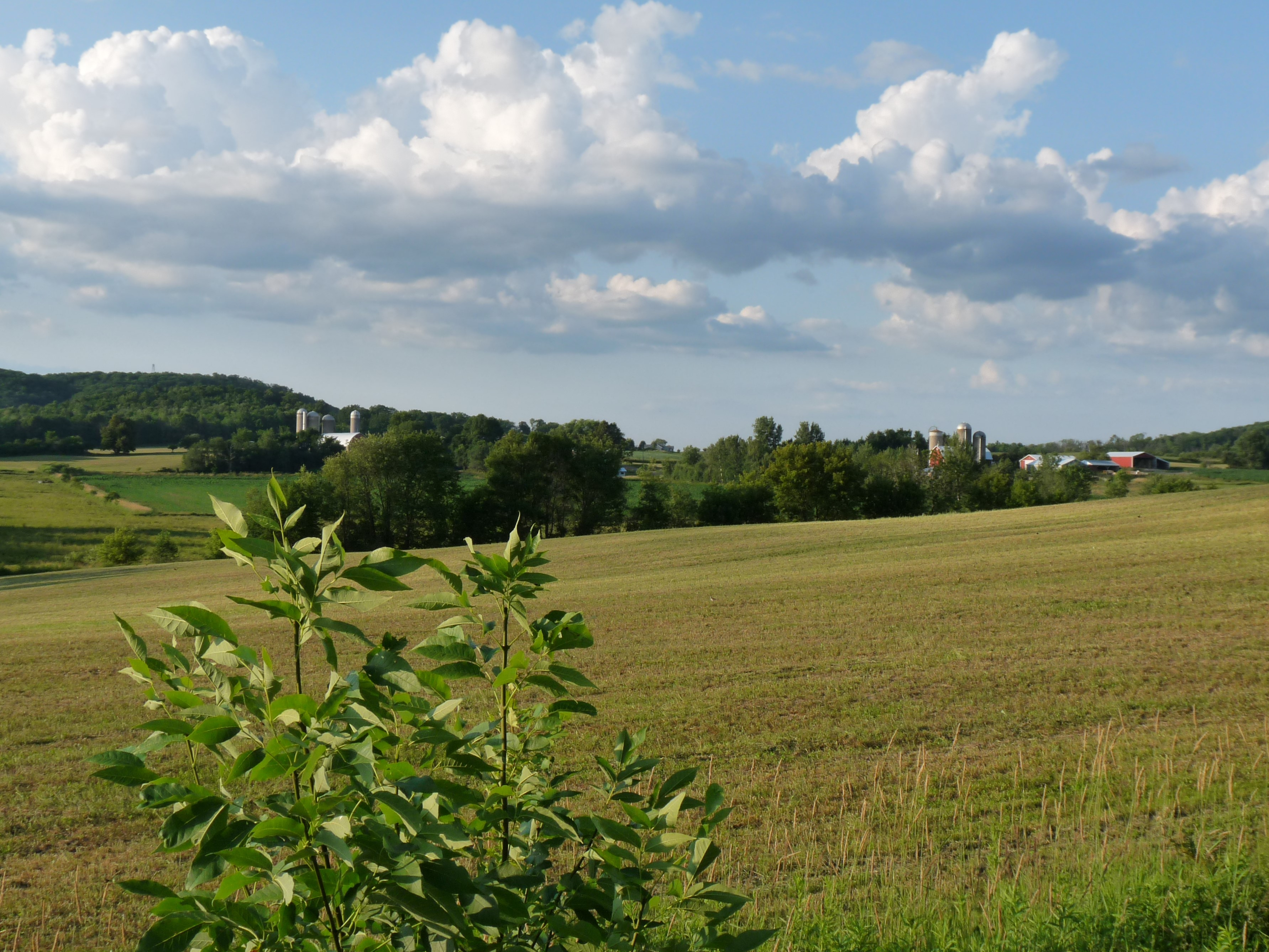
- Rolling farmland between the mounds on the north end of Hendren

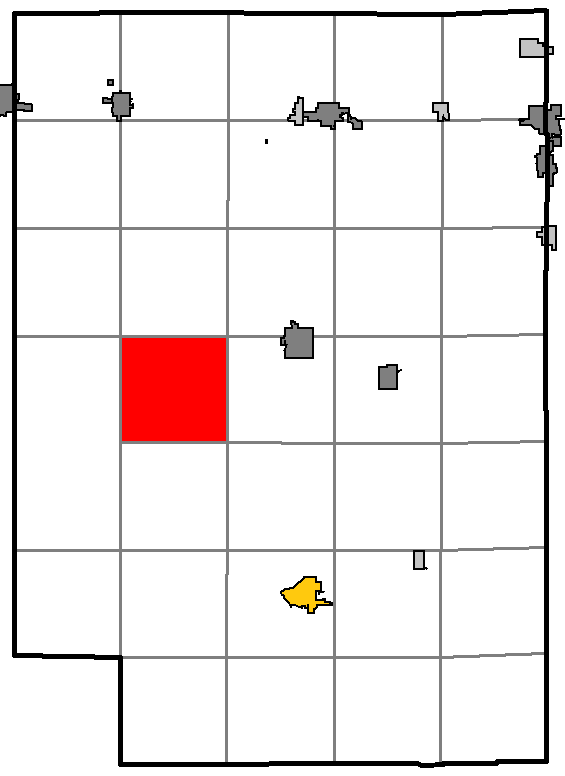
- Location of Hendren, Clark County

- Location of Clark County, Wisconsin
- Coordinates: 44°43′52″N 90°43′49″W
- Country: United States
- State: Wisconsin
- County: Clark

Area
  - Total: 35.9 sq mi (93.0 km^{2})
  - Land: 35.8 sq mi (92.7 km^{2})
  - Water: 0.12 sq mi (0.3 km^{2})
- Elevation: 1,142 ft (348 m)

Population (2020)
  - Total: 433
  - Density: 12.1/sq mi (4.67/km^{2})
- Time zone: UTC-6 (Central (CST))
  - Summer (DST): UTC-5 (CDT)
- Area codes: 715 & 534
- FIPS code: 55-33900
- GNIS feature ID: 1583377

Hendren is a town in Clark County in the U.S. state of Wisconsin. The population was 433 at the 2020 census. The unincorporated communities of Tioga and Willard are located in the town.

== History ==
Hendren was named for William T. Hendren, a member of the clergy who helped organize churches in the area.

== Geography ==
The Town of Hendren is located in west-central Clark County. According to the United States Census Bureau, the town has a total area of 35.9 square miles (93.0 km^{2}), of which 35.8 square miles (92.7 km^{2}) is land and 0.1 square miles (0.3 km^{2}), or 0.33%, is water.

== Demographics ==
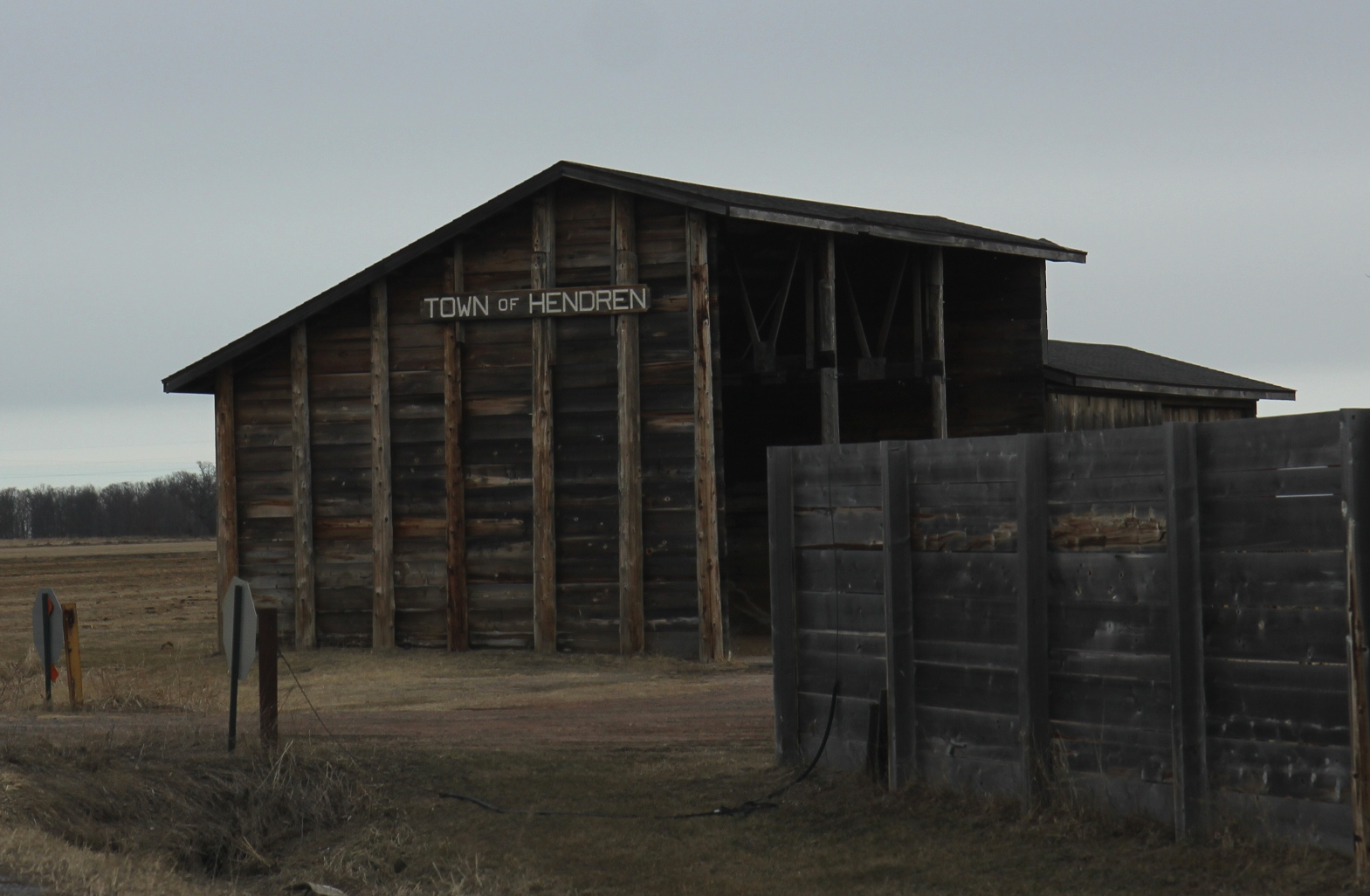
Hendren's town shed, on the north side of Willard

As of the census of 2000, there were 513 people, 197 households, and 131 families residing in the town. The population density was 14.3 people per square mile (5.5/km^{2}). There were 247 housing units at an average density of 6.9 per square mile (2.7/km^{2}). The racial makeup of the town was 98.64% White, 0.39% Pacific Islander, 0.97% from other races. Hispanic or Latino of any race were 1.56% of the population.

There were 197 households, out of which 29.9% had children under the age of 18 living with them, 58.4% were married couples living together, 4.6% had a female householder with no husband present, and 33.0% were non-families. 28.4% of all households were made up of individuals, and 13.7% had someone living alone who was 65 years of age or older. The average household size was 2.60 and the average family size was 3.26.

In the town, the population was spread out, with 28.3% under the age of 18, 4.7% from 18 to 24, 25.0% from 25 to 44, 23.8% from 45 to 64, and 18.3% who were 65 years of age or older. The median age was 41 years. For every 100 females, there were 112.0 males. For every 100 females age 18 and over, there were 105.6 males.

The median income for a household in the town was $27,353, and the median income for a family was $37,917. Males had a median income of $28,333 versus $20,357 for females. The per capita income for the town was $13,318. About 15.6% of families and 18.6% of the population were below the poverty line, including 28.2% of those under age 18 and 11.3% of those age 65 or over.
