= Denis Hendren =

English cricketer and umpire (1882–1962)

Personal information
- Full name: Denis Hendren
- Born: 25 September 1882; Turnham Green, Middlesex, England
- Died: 29 May 1962 (aged 79); Paddington, London, England
- Batting: Right-handed
- Bowling: Right-arm slow
- Relatives: Patsy Hendren (brother)

Domestic team information
- Years: Team
- 1910–1921: Durham
- 1905–1919: Middlesex

Career statistics
Competition	First-class
Matches	9
Runs scored	109
Batting average	7.78
100s/50s	–/–
Top score	23
Balls bowled	186
Wickets	3
Bowling average	34.66
5 wickets in innings	–
10 wickets in match	–
Best bowling	1/19
Catches/stumpings	5/–
- Source: Cricinfo, 2 January 2012

Denis Hendren (25 September 1882 – 29 May 1962) was an English cricketer and umpire. Hendren was a right-handed batsman who bowled right-arm slow. He was born at Turnham Green, Middlesex.

Hendren made his first-class debut for Middlesex against Gloucestershire in the 1905 County Championship. He made seven further first-class appearances for Middlesex between 1905 and 1907, playing his final match against Nottinghamshire in the 1907 County Championship. During this period he met little success, scoring 86 runs with a high score of 23. He also took 2 wickets, which came at a bowling average of 42.50.

Hendren moved to the north of England, where he made his debut for Durham in the 1910 Minor Counties Championship against Norfolk. Between 1910 and 1914, he made forty Minor Counties Championship appearances, with World War I leading the cancellation of county cricket until 1919. Hendren served as a private in the Durham Light Infantry during the war. He made a return to first-class cricket after the war with Middlesex in the 1919 County Championship at Lord's, where he played alongside his more famous brother and future England Test cricketer Patsy Hendren. He claimed the wicket of Harry Dean in this match, while with the bat he scored 15 runs in Middlesex's first-innings, before being dismissed by Charlie Hallows, while in their second-innings he was unbeaten on 8, with the match ending in a draw. This match represented his final first-class appearance, he returned to Durham in 1921, playing in two Minor Counties Championship matches against Northumberland and the Yorkshire Second XI.

He later stood as a first-class umpire between 1931 and 1957, standing in 390 matches. He was three months away from his 75th birthday when he stood in his final match. He died at Paddington, London on 29 May 1962.
