= Walter Scott (footballer, born 1886) =

English footballer (1886–1955)

Personal information
- Full name: Walter Scott
- Date of birth: 21 January 1886
- Place of birth: Worksop, England
- Date of death: 16 September 1955 (aged 69)
- Place of death: Worksop, England
- Position: Goalkeeper

Senior career*
Years	Team	Apps	(Gls)
1904–1905	Worksop West End		
1905–1906	Worksop Central		
1906–1907	Worksop Town		
1907–1909	Grimsby Town	80	(0)
1909–1910	Everton	18	(0)
1911–1913	Sunderland	34	(0)
1913–1915	Shelbourne		
1915–	Belfast United		
–1919	Worksop Town		
1917	→ Brentford (guest)	3	(0)
1920	Grimsby Town	19	(0)
- Gainsborough Trinity

International career
1913–1914	Irish League XI	5	(0)
- * Club domestic league appearances and goals

Walter Scott (21 January 1886 – 1955) was an English professional footballer who played as a goalkeeper in the Football League for Grimsby Town, Sunderland and Everton. He notably became the first goalkeeper to save three penalties in a single match, for Grimsby Town versus Burnley in a Second Division fixture in 1909. He saved 14 of 17 penalties during the 1908–09 season. He represented the Irish League XI.

== Personal life ==
Scott briefly served as a private in the Army Service Corps during the First World War, being stationed at the Mechanical Transport Training Depot in Osterley Park between July and October 1917.

== Career statistics ==
Appearances and goals by club, season and competition
Club	Season	League			FA Cup		Total	
Club	Season	Division	Apps	Goals	Apps	Goals	Apps	Goals
Everton	1909–10	First Division	11	0	0	0	11	0
Everton	1910–11	First Division	7	0	0	0	7	0
Everton	Total		18	0	0	0	18	0
Sunderland	1911–12	First Division	34	0	4	0	38	0
Career total			52	0	4	0	56	0
