= Jack Peart (footballer, born 1884) =

English footballer

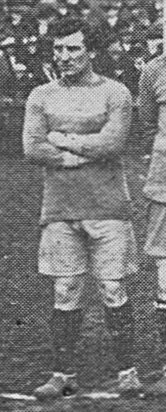
- Peart with Brentford in 1919.

Personal information
- Full name: John Charles Peart
- Date of birth: 13 October 1884
- Place of birth: Tewkesbury, England
- Date of death: September 1965 (aged 80)
- Place of death: Hounslow, England
- Height: 5 ft 7 in (1.70 m)
- Position: Full back

Senior career*
Years	Team	Apps	(Gls)
- Plumstead
1910–1914	Woolwich Arsenal	57	(0)
1914–1916	Croydon Common	9	(0)
1916–1919	Brentford	60	(3)
1919–1921	Arsenal	6	(0)
- Margate
- * Club domestic league appearances and goals

John Charles Peart (13 October 1884 – September 1965) was an English professional footballer who played in the Football League for Arsenal as a full back.

== Personal life ==
Peart enlisted as a driver in the Royal Army Service Corps in 1903 and later held the rank of corporal. He served with the BEF at the Battle of Mons in 1914, after which he was discharged from the army and then recalled in November 1916.

== Honours ==
Brentford

- London Combination: 1918–19

== Career statistics ==
Appearances and goals by club, season and competition
Club	Season	League			FA Cup		Total	
Club	Season	Division	Apps	Goals	Apps	Goals	Apps	Goals
Woolwich Arsenal	1910–11	First Division	7	0	0	0	7	0
Woolwich Arsenal	1911–12	First Division	34	0	1	0	35	0
Woolwich Arsenal	1912–13	First Division	16	0	2	0	18	0
Woolwich Arsenal	Total		57	0	3	0	60	0
Arsenal	1919–20	First Division	5	0	0	0	5	0
Arsenal	1920–21	First Division	1	0	0	0	1	0
Arsenal	Total		63	0	3	0	66	0
Career total			63	0	3	0	66	0
