= Billy Yenson =

English footballer (1883–1944)

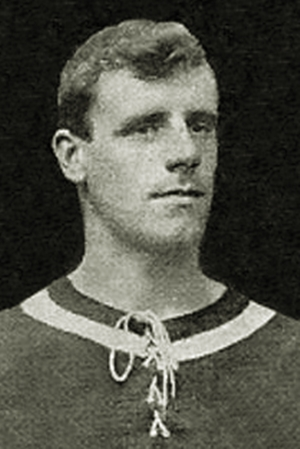
- Yenson while with West Ham United in 1908.

Personal information
- Full name: Philip Owen Yenson
- Date of birth: March 1883
- Place of birth: Kingston Bagpuize, England
- Date of death: 20 January 1944 (aged 60)
- Place of death: Ilford, England
- Position: Centre forward

Youth career
- Russell Road School

Senior career*
Years	Team	Apps	(Gls)
- Ferndale
–1900	Stanley		
1900–1903	West Ham United	24	(0)
1903–1905	Bolton Wanderers	28	(8)
1905–1908	Queens Park Rangers	90	(4)
1908–1909	West Ham United	26	(0)
1909–1914	Croydon Common	137	(12)
- Crystal Palace
1917	Brentford	15	(0)
1919–1920	Margate		
Total		320	(24)
- * Club domestic league appearances and goals

Philip Owen Yenson (March 1883 – 20 January 1944) was an English professional footballer who played as a centre forward and half back, best remembered for being a part of the Bolton Wanderers team which won the 1904 FA Cup. He spent the majority of his career in the Southern League, playing for Croydon Common, Queens Park Rangers and West Ham United.

== Personal life ==
Yenson's son Kenny was also a footballer.

== Honours ==
Bolton Wanderers

- FA Cup: 1903–04

Queens Park Rangers

- Southern League First Division: 1907–08

Croydon Common

- Southern League Second Division: 1913–14

== Career statistics ==
Appearances and goals by club, season and competition
Club	Season	League			FA Cup		Other		Total	
Club	Season	Division	Apps	Goals	Apps	Goals	Apps	Goals	Apps	Goals
West Ham United	1901–02	Southern League First Division	5	0	1	0	—		6	0
West Ham United	1902–03	Southern League First Division	19	0	0	0	—		19	0
West Ham United	Total		24	0	1	0	—		25	0
Bolton Wanderers	1903–04	Second Division	17	5	6	2	—		23	7
Bolton Wanderers	1904–05	Second Division	11	3	0	0	—		11	3
Bolton Wanderers	Total		28	8	6	2	—		34	10
Queens Park Rangers	1905–06	Southern League First Division	34	3	1	0	—		35	3
Queens Park Rangers	1906–07	Southern League First Division	35	1	2	0	1 (Note: Appearance in Southern Professional Charity Cup)	0	38	1
Queens Park Rangers	1907–08	Southern League First Division	21	0	1	0	1	0	23	0
Queens Park Rangers	Total		90	4	4	0	2	0	96	4
West Ham United	1908–09	Southern League First Division	26	0	6	0	—		32	0
West Ham United	West Ham United total		50	0	7	0	—		57	0
Croydon Common	1909–10	Southern League First Division	37	2	2	0	—		39	2
Croydon Common	1910–11	Southern League Second Division	20	0	3	0	—		23	0
Croydon Common	1911–12	Southern League Second Division	23	6	4	1	—		27	7
Croydon Common	1912–13	Southern League Second Division	23	0	4	0	—		27	0
Croydon Common	1913–14	Southern League Second Division	30	4	1	0	—		31	4
Croydon Common	1914–15	Southern League First Division	4	0	0	0	—		4	0
Croydon Common	Total		137	12	14	1	—		151	13
Career total			305	24	31	3	2	0	338	27
