= Maurice Woodward =

English footballer

Personal information
- Full name: Maurice Woodward
- Date of birth: 12 October 1891
- Place of birth: Enderby, England
- Date of death: 17 February 1950 (aged 58)
- Place of death: West Bromwich, England
- Height: 5 ft 11 in (1.80 m)
- Positions: Half back; left back

Senior career*
| Years | Team | Apps | (Gls) |
- Enderby Granite
- Enderby Town
| 1912–1914 | Leicester Fosse | 2 | (0) |
| 1914 | Southend United | | |
| 1917–1918 | → Brentford (guest) | 7 | (0) |
| 1918–1919 | → Brentford (guest) | 13 | (0) |
| 1919–1922 | Wolverhampton Wanderers | 33 | (1) |
| 1922 | Bristol Rovers | 0 | (0) |
- * Club domestic league appearances and goals

Maurice Woodward (21 October 1891 – 17 February 1950) was an English professional footballer who played as a half back and left back in the Football League for Wolverhampton Wanderers and Leicester Fosse.

== Personal life ==
Woodward served as a sergeant in the Football Battalion of the Middlesex Regiment during the First World War. He suffered a knee injury and from sciatica during the war. He later became a publican in Wall Heath.

== Career statistics ==
Appearances and goals by club, season and competition
| Club | Season | League | | | FA Cup | | Total | |
| Club | Season | Division | Apps | Goals | Apps | Goals | Apps | Goals |
|---|---|---|---|---|---|---|---|---|
| Leicester Fosse | 1913–14 | Second Division | 2 | 0 | 0 | 0 | 2 | 0 |
| Wolverhampton Wanderers | 1919–20 | Second Division | 9 | 1 | 0 | 0 | 9 | 1 |
| Wolverhampton Wanderers | 1920–21 | Second Division | 21 | 0 | 3 | 0 | 24 | 0 |
| Wolverhampton Wanderers | 1921–22 | Second Division | 3 | 0 | 1 | 0 | 4 | 0 |
| Wolverhampton Wanderers | Total | | 33 | 1 | 4 | 0 | 37 | 1 |
| Career total | | | 35 | 1 | 4 | 0 | 39 | 1 |

== Honours ==
Wolverhampton Wanderers

- FA Cup runner-up: 1920–21
