= John Green (footballer, born 1894) =

English footballer

Personal information
- Full name: John A Green
- Date of birth: September 1894
- Place of birth: St Helens, England
- Date of death: 1966 (aged 71–72)
- Position: Inside right

Senior career*
Years	Team	Apps	(Gls)
- Prescot Cables
–1920	Wolverhampton Wanderers	6	(1)
1917–1918	→ Brentford (guest)	9	(1)
1918	→ Brentford (guest)	1	(0)
- Formby
- * Club domestic league appearances and goals

John A. Green (September 1894 – 1966), sometimes known as Jack Green, was an English professional footballer who played as an inside right in the Football League for Wolverhampton Wanderers. He also played in non-League football for Prescot Cables and Formby
