= Albert Chester =

English footballer

Personal information
- Full name: Albert Edward Nixon Chester
- Date of birth: 17 March 1886
- Place of birth: Hexham, England
- Date of death: 21 December 1962 (aged 76)
- Place of death: West Hartlepool, England
- Position: Inside left

Senior career*
Years	Team	Apps	(Gls)
- Wingate Albion
1911–1912	Preston North End	2	(0)
1912–1916	Croydon Common	67	(25)
1916	Millwall Athletic	1	(0)
1916–1919	Brentford	58	(10)
1919	Tottenham Hotspur	2	(0)
1919	Queens Park Rangers	1	(0)
- Ramsgate
- * Club domestic league appearances and goals

Albert Edward Nixon Chester (17 March 1886 – 21 December 1962) was an English professional footballer, best remembered for his years as an inside left in the Southern League with Croydon Common and Queens Park Rangers. Earlier in his career, he played league football with Preston North End and guested for Brentford, Tottenham Hotspur and Millwall Athletic during the First World War.

== Personal life ==
As of 1939, Chester was working as a bricklayer and living in Easington.

== Career statistics ==
Appearances and goals by club, season and competition
Club	Season	League			FA Cup		Total	
Club	Season	Division	Apps	Goals	Apps	Goals	Apps	Goals
Preston North End	1910–11	First Division	2	1	0	0	2	1
Croydon Common	1912–13	Southern League Second Division	17	5	4	0	21	5
Croydon Common	1913–14	Southern League Second Division	27	15	1	0	28	15
Croydon Common	1914–15	Southern League First Division	23	5	2	0	25	5
Croydon Common	Total		67	25	7	0	74	25
Queens Park Rangers	1919–20	Southern League First Division	1	0	0	0	1	0
Career total			70	26	7	0	77	26

== Honours ==
Croydon Common

- Southern League Second Division: 1913–14
