= David Chalmers (footballer, born 1891) =

Scottish footballer

Personal information
- Full name: David Muir Chalmers
- Date of birth: 21 July 1891
- Place of birth: Leven, Scotland
- Date of death: 24 April 1920 (aged 28)
- Place of death: Leven, Scotland
- Position: Centre forward

Senior career*
Years	Team	Apps	(Gls)
- Leven Celtic
- Buckhaven
1909–1911	Kilmarnock	17	(1)
1910	→ Arthurlie (loan)		
1911–1912	Third Lanark	17	(4)
1911–1912	→ Raith Rovers (loan)	9	(2)
1912–1913	East Fife		
1913–1914	York City		
1914–1915	Grimsby Town	5	(0)
1917–1918	→ Brentford (guest)	7	(3)
1915–1916	East Fife		
1916–1920	Gillingham	12	(1)
- * Club domestic league appearances and goals

David Muir Chalmers (22 July 1891 – 24 April 1920) was a Scottish professional footballer who played as a centre forward in the Scottish League for Kilmarnock, Third Lanark and Raith Rovers. He also played in the Football League for Grimsby Town.

== Personal life ==
Chalmers served as a private in the Football Battalion during the First World War.

== Career statistics ==
Appearances and goals by club, season and competition
Club	Season	League			National Cup		Total	
Club	Season	Division	Apps	Goals	Apps	Goals	Apps	Goals
Kilmarnock	1909–10	Scottish League First Division	13	1	0	0	13	1
Kilmarnock	1910–11	Scottish League First Division	4	0	—		4	0
Kilmarnock	Total		17	1	0	0	17	1
Third Lanark	1910–11	Scottish League First Division	7	3	1	0	8	3
Third Lanark	1911–12	Scottish League First Division	10	1	—		10	1
Third Lanark	Total		17	4	1	0	18	4
Raith Rovers (loan)	1911–12	Scottish League First Division	9	2	1	0	10	2
Grimsby Town	1914–15	Second Division	3	0	0	0	3	0
Gillingham	1919–20	Southern League First Division	12	1	1	0	13	1
Career Total			58	8	3	0	61	8
