= Patsy Hendren =

English cricketer (1889-1962)

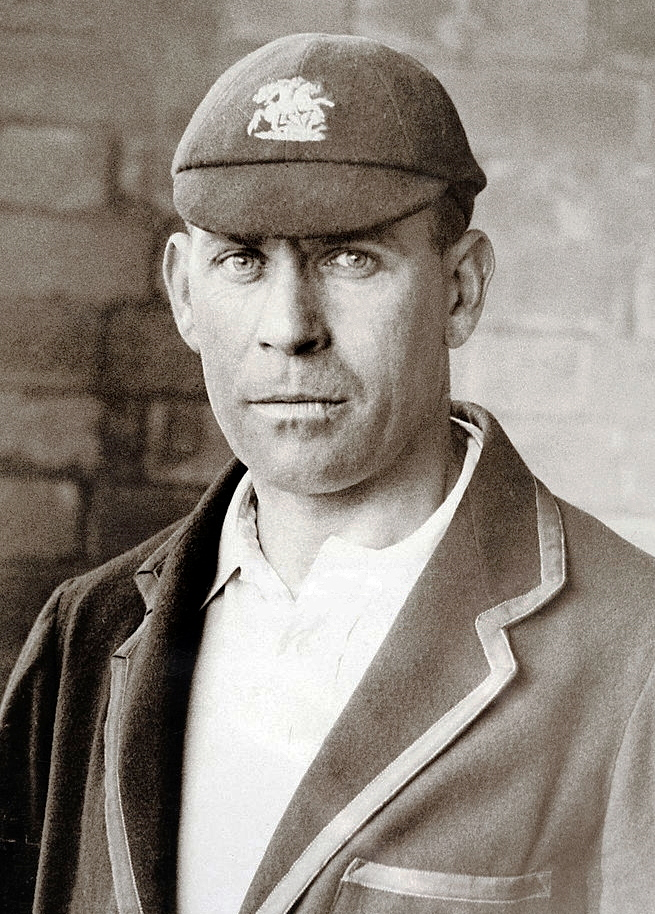
- Hendren in about 1924

Personal information
- Full name: Elias Henry Hendren
- Born: 5 February 1889; Turnham Green, Middlesex, England
- Died: 4 October 1962 (aged 73); Tooting Bec, London, England
- Batting: Right-handed
- Bowling: Right-arm off-break

International information
- National side: England
- Test debut (cap 181): 17 December 1920 v Australia
- Last Test: 18 March 1935 v West Indies

Career statistics
Competition	Test	First-class
Matches	51	833
Runs scored	3,525	57,611
Batting average	47.63	50.80
100s/50s	7/21	170/272
Top score	205*	301*
Balls bowled	47	4,830
Wickets	1	47
Bowling average	31.00	54.76
5 wickets in innings	0	1
10 wickets in match	0	0
Best bowling	1/27	5/43
Catches/stumpings	33/–	759/–
- Source: CricInfo, 6 December 2019

Elias Henry "Patsy" Hendren (5 February 1889 – 4 October 1962) was an English first-class cricketer, active 1907 to 1937, who played for Middlesex and England. He also had a concurrent career as a footballer and had a long tenure with Brentford F.C. He was born in Turnham Green and died in Tooting Bec. A right-handed batsman who occasionally bowled off breaks, Hendren was one of the most prolific batsmen of the inter-war period, averaging 47.63 in his 51 Test matches and 50.80 in all his first-class matches. He has the third highest first-class run aggregate of 57,611 runs (after Jack Hobbs and Frank Woolley), and his total of 170 centuries ranks second only to Hobbs, who was a personal friend. Hendren was a noted wit, a keen practical joker and had a talent for mimicry.

== Early years ==
Hendren joined the Lord's groundstaff at the age of 16, and made his first-class debut for Middlesex in 1907, though the game was abandoned after the first day when spectators caused damage to the pitch and he did not get to bat. He played nine games the following year and gradually established himself in the team, but it was 1911 before he made his first hundred, and until World War I forced the suspension of the County Championship he never managed to average 40 in a season. Hendren joined the 1st Sportsmens' Battalion of the Royal Fusiliers as a private in September 1914, before being transferred to work at a munitions factory in Royal Leamington Spa. He rejoined the Royal Fusiliers towards the end of the war.

== Career ==
Returning to cricket in 1919 Hendren scored 1,655 runs and averaged over 60, as he was to do the following year as well. He was a strong player of fast bowling. He was made a Wisden Cricketer of the Year in 1920 and was picked for the 1920/21 Ashes tour, making his Test debut at Sydney and making 58 in the second innings despite Australia's huge 377-run victory. He scored two further Test fifties in the series and retained his place for the 1921 series against the same opponents, but failed completely in his four innings, totalling only 17 runs.

1923 was a productive year for Hendren, as he scored 3,010 runs in the season including 13 centuries; he was recalled to the England side the following year and averaged 132.66 against South Africa. Further success was to follow as he averaged over 56 in every year from 1922 to 1928. In both 1927 and 1928 he again made 13 hundreds, in the latter year recording his highest season's aggregate of 3,311 runs.

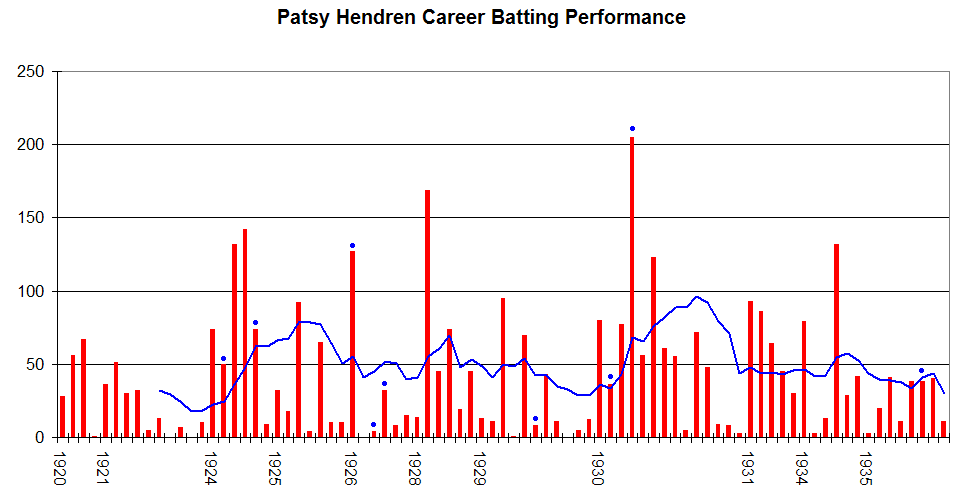
Patsy Hendren's career performance graph.

In 1929/30, Hendren went on tour with England to the West Indies: his 693 series runs came at an average of 115.50 and included his highest Test score, 205 not out at Port of Spain; his first-class average for the tour as a whole was 135.76. He made six consecutive Test 50s (77, 205 not out, 56, 123, 61 and 55) a new England record, since equalled by Ted Dexter, Ken Barrington and Alastair Cook. Returning to England, he managed a top score of only 72 against the Australians, but in 1933 he topped 3,000 runs for the third and final time at the age of 44 and made his highest score of 301 not out.

In 1933 he invented a sort of helmet. Against the West Indies at Lord's he appeared wearing a rubber hat or cap with three peaks, two of which fitted over the sides of his head. Although a competent hooker of fast bowling he felt he needed extra protection to face bowlers such as Martindale and Constantine.

He played his final Test match in 1934/1935 at Kingston, Jamaica, the game in which George Headley made 270 not out to win the series for the West Indians, but continued to play well in domestic cricket for a few years more. Hendren's final season in the game was 1937, and fittingly he made a century in his last County Championship match, the local derby with Surrey. He did, however, appear for "England Past and Present" against Sir PF Warner's XI at Folkestone in September 1938, aged 49, but was caught by the 20-year-old Denis Compton for a duck in what was to be his last first-class innings.

In 1919 he played in a Victory International for England. In retirement, he coached cricket at Harrow School (succeeding Wilfred Rhodes) and Sussex, and later acted as scorer for Middlesex (1952–1960). His health failed and he died in hospital from Alzheimer's disease at the Whittington Hospital Tooting Bec, London, at the age of 73. Seven years after his death, Hendren was the subject of a biography, titled 'Patsy' Hendren – The Cricketer and His Times.

== Football ==
Elias 'Patsy' Hendren
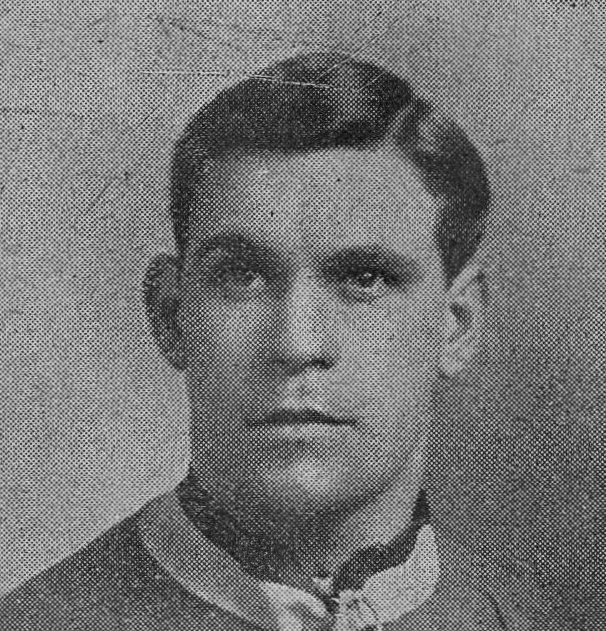
- Hendren in 1920

Personal information
- Position: Outside right

Senior career*
Years	Team	Apps	(Gls)
1906–1907	Sandersons		
1907	Queens Park Rangers	0	(0)
1907–1908	Brentford	1	(0)
1908–1909	Manchester City	2	(0)
1909–1911	Coventry City	33	(14)
1911–1927	Brentford	399	(69)
Total		435	(83)

International career
1919	England	1	(0)
- * Club domestic league appearances and goals

=== Early years ===
Hendren began his football career with local team Sandersons in 1906, before having spells with Queens Park Rangers and Brentford in the Southern League. He was sold by Brentford to Manchester City in 1908 and appeared twice for them in the Football League First Division before moving on to Coventry City of the Southern League in October 1909. A successful first season saw Hendren make 29 appearances scoring 13 goals, but he was only to make 4 appearances in the 1910–11 season.

=== Brentford ===
Aged 22 Hendren returned to Brentford for the 1911–12 season Maintaining both cricket and football careers meant that Hendren sometimes missed the opening games of the season during this second stint with the club, although during the 1920–21 season he made only two appearances due to the 1920–21 Australian Tour and made no appearances in the 1924–25 season for the same reason. He was chosen to represent the Southern League XI against the Football League XI during the 1913-14 season. Brentford rose from the Southern League to the Football League during Hendren's 15 year period with the club, and he retired from football to commit himself to cricket aged 38 having made 432 appearances in total for the club, scoring 74 goals. He was posthumously inducted into the Brentford Hall of Fame in 2015.

=== International ===
Hendren made one appearance for England in the unofficial Victory International against Wales in October 1919.

== Personal ==
Patsy's brother Denis Hendren played 9 first-class games for Middlesex. A second brother, John, was killed at Delville Wood in July 1916 while serving with the Royal Fusiliers. Hendren was a Catholic.

== Football honours ==
Brentford

- London Combination: 1918–19
