= Harry Cockerill (footballer) =

English footballer

Personal information
- Full name: Henry Leslie Cockerill
- Date of birth: 14 January 1894
- Place of birth: Ryhope, England
- Date of death: 1960 (aged 65–66)
- Position: Left half

Senior career*
Years	Team	Apps	(Gls)
–1919	Arsenal		
1920–1921	Luton Town	8	(0)
1921–1922	Mid Rhondda		
1922–1923	Bristol City	16	(0)
1923–1924	Reading	55	(2)
1925	Merthyr Town	3	(1)
- * Club domestic league appearances and goals

Henry Leslie Cockerill (14 January 1894 – 1960) was an English professional footballer who played as a left half in the Football League for Reading, Bristol City, Luton Town and Merthyr Town.

== Career statistics ==
Appearances and goals by club, season and competition
Club	Season	League			National Cup		Total	
Club	Season	Division	Apps	Goals	Apps	Goals	Apps	Goals
Luton Town	1920–21	Third Division	8	0	0	0	8	0
Career total			8	0	0	0	8	0
