= The Football Combination =

- Founded: 1915
- Folded: 2012
- Country: England; Wales

The Football Combination was a football competition for the reserve teams of English Football League clubs from Southern England, the Midlands and Wales; other clubs from the Midlands and those from the North playing in the Central League.

== History ==
The Combination was inaugurated in 1915 with twelve founder members: Arsenal, Brentford, Chelsea, Clapton Orient, Croydon Common, Crystal Palace, Fulham, Millwall, Queens Park Rangers, Tottenham Hotspur, Watford and West Ham United. First team matches were played until 1919, from when Reserve teams took over. Croydon Common and Watford dropped out and were replaced with Charlton Athletic and Southend United.

Up to 1926 it was known as the London Combination, but from the 1926–27 season, ten clubs from outside the London area were admitted and the name became something of a misnomer. The new clubs were: Brighton & Hove Albion, Cardiff City, Coventry City, Leicester City, Luton Town, Portsmouth, Reading, Southampton, Swansea Town and Watford (re-admitted).

From the early 1930s to the outbreak of World War II, 24 clubs were in membership, with Aldershot, Bournemouth & Boscombe Athletic, Bristol City, Northampton Town, Norwich City and Swindon Town joining at various times and others resigning. Following the resumption post-war in 1946, the number of clubs was increased to 32, the title changed to Football Combination and it was re-organised into two Sections A and B, with the winners playing-off for the Championship. A Combination Cup was also inaugurated to increase the number of fixtures played.

A number of changes to the constitution took place in the 1950s and 1960s. From 1952–53 promotion and relegation were introduced, as the Combination was split into two Divisions, 1 and 2, with the top eight from Sections A and B of the previous season forming Division 1, and the bottom eight in each forming Division 2. This was short-lived and in 1955–56 a new format of one Division of 32 clubs was introduced, with teams playing 42 matches on a geographical basis. The Combination Cup was discontinued.

Promotion and relegation returned for 1958–59 in two Divisions, based on the level of the first team of each club in the Football League, i.e. the top two Divisions of the Football League played in Division 1 of the Combination, and Division 3 and 4 teams were placed in Division 2. In 1961–62 things changed again and the Combination was re-organised into a Saturday Section and a Midweek Section, with a play-off for the title.

For 1963–64 the Combination reverted to Divisions 1 and 2, with the Saturday Section becoming Division 1 and the Midweek Section becoming Division 2, and promotion/relegation was reintroduced. The decline in numbers led to the reintroduction of the Combination Cup in 1966–67, and by 1968–69 the Combination was down to one Division of 26 teams.

For a time in the 1990s and early 2000s the league was sponsored by Avon Insurance, a subsidiary of NFU Mutual.

=== Demise ===
The Combination originally included reserve teams of top League clubs within the region, but in 1999 the FA Premier Reserve League was founded. The reserve teams of the FA Premier League clubs and some First Division clubs joined that competition, reducing the size of the Combination (however, in 2006, Premier League clubs voted that only the 20 top-tier teams would be able to play in this league, which meant several well-established reserve sides moving to the Combination).

The 2011–12 season was the last in the history of the Combination, with the introduction of the EPPP making the league surplus to requirements.

== Champions ==
| Season | | Ref |
|---|---|---|
| 1915–16 | Chelsea | |
| 1916–17 | West Ham United | |
| 1917–18 | Chelsea | |
| 1918–19 | Brentford | |
| 1919–20 | Tottenham Hotspur | |
| 1920–21 | West Ham United | |
| 1921–22 | Tottenham Hotspur | |
| 1922–23 | Arsenal | |
| 1923–24 | West Ham United | |
| 1924–25 | West Ham United | |
| 1925–26 | Tottenham Hotspur | |
| 1926–27 | Arsenal | |
| 1927–28 | Arsenal | |
| 1928–29 | Arsenal | |
| 1929–30 | Arsenal | |
| 1930–31 | Arsenal | |
| 1931–32 | Brentford | |
| 1932–33 | Brentford | |
| 1933–34 | Arsenal | |
| 1934–35 | Arsenal | |
| 1935–36 | Portsmouth | |
| 1936–37 | Arsenal | |
| 1937–38 | Arsenal | |
| 1938–39 | Arsenal | |
| 1939–46 | Not held | |
| 1946–47 | Arsenal | |
| 1947–48 | West Ham United | |
| 1948–49 | Chelsea | |
| 1949–50 | Charlton Athletic | |
| 1950–51 | Arsenal | |
| 1951–52 | Reading | |
| 1952–53 | Tottenham Hotspur | |
| 1953–54 | West Ham United | |
| 1954–55 | Chelsea | |
| 1955–56 | Tottenham Hotspur | |
| 1956–57 | Tottenham Hotspur | |
| 1957–58 | Chelsea | |
| 1958–59 | Leicester City | |
| 1959–60 | Chelsea | |
| 1960–61 | Chelsea | |
| 1961–62 | Tottenham Hotspur | |
| 1962–63 | Arsenal | |
| 1963–64 | Tottenham Hotspur | |
| 1964–65 | Chelsea | |
| 1965–66 | Tottenham Hotspur | |
| 1966–67 | Tottenham Hotspur | |
| 1967–68 | Tottenham Hotspur | |
| 1968–69 | Arsenal | |
| 1969–70 | Arsenal | |
| 1970–71 | Tottenham Hotspur | |
| 1971–72 | Tottenham Hotspur | |
| 1972–73 | Ipswich Town | |
| 1973–74 | AFC Bournemouth | |
| 1974–75 | Chelsea | |
| 1975–76 | Ipswich Town | |
| 1976–77 | Chelsea | |
| 1977–78 | West Ham United | |
| 1978–79 | Tottenham Hotspur | |
| 1979–80 | Tottenham Hotspur | |
| 1980–81 | Southampton | |
| 1981–82 | Queens Park Rangers | |
| 1982–83 | Queens Park Rangers | |
| 1983–84 | Arsenal | |
| 1984–85 | Chelsea | |
| 1985–86 | West Ham United | |
| 1986–87 | Tottenham Hotspur | |
| 1987–88 | Tottenham Hotspur | |
| 1988–89 | Tottenham Hotspur | |
| 1989–90 | Arsenal | |
| 1990–91 | Chelsea | |
| 1991–92 | Southampton | |
| 1992–93 | Millwall | |
| 1993–94 | Chelsea | |
| 1994–95 | Tottenham Hotspur | |
| 1995–96 | Queens Park Rangers | |
| 1996–97 | Wimbledon | |
| 1997–98 | Charlton Athletic | |
| 1998–99 | Charlton Athletic | |
| 1999–2000 | Millwall | |
| 2000–01 | Fulham | |
| 2001–02 | Queens Park Rangers | |
| 2002–03 | Crystal Palace | |

| Season | Central & East Division | Wales & West Division |
|---|---|---|
| 2003–04 | Reading | Cardiff City |
| 2004–05 | Luton Town | Cardiff City |

| Season | Central Division | East Division | Wales & West Division |
|---|---|---|---|
| 2005–06 | Reading | Luton Town | Cheltenham Town |
| 2006–07 | Brighton & Hove Albion | Ipswich Town | Cheltenham Town |
| 2007–08 | Southampton | Ipswich Town | Bristol City |
| 2008–09 | Reading | Luton Town | Plymouth Argyle |
| 2009–10 | Brighton & Hove Albion | Watford | Exeter City |

== Other Divisions ==
Various other Divisions were utilised in the 1940s to 1960s to accommodate the number of member clubs.

| Season | Section A | Section B |
|---|---|---|
| 1946–47 | Arsenal | Portsmouth |
| 1947–48 | Arsenal | West Ham United |
| 1948–49 | Arsenal | Chelsea |
| 1949–50 | Fulham | Charlton Athletic |
| 1950–51 | Arsenal | Chelsea |
| 1951–52 | Reading | Tottenham Hotspur |

| Season | Division 2 |
|---|---|
| 1952–53 | N/A |
| 1953–54 | N/A |
| 1954–55 | N/A |
| 1955–58 | Not held |
| 1958–59 | Bournemouth & Boscombe Athletic |
| 1959–60 | Watford |
| 1960–61 | Swansea Town |
| 1961–63 | Not held |
| 1963–64 | Chelsea |
| 1964–65 | Southampton |
| 1965–66 | Reading |
| 1966–67 | Walsall |
| 1967–68 | Bristol City |

| Season | Saturday | Midweek |
|---|---|---|
| 1961–62 | Tottenham Hotspur | Leyton Orient |
| 1962–63 | Arsenal | Chelsea |

== Combination Cup ==
The Combination also operated a cup competition in various seasons to give the member clubs extra fixtures.

=== Winners ===
| Season | Winners |
|---|---|
| 1946–47 | Swansea Town |
| 1947–48 | Leicester City |
| 1948–49 | Bournemouth & Boscombe Athletic |
| 1949–50 | Swansea Town |
| 1950–51 | Charlton Athletic |
| 1951–52 | Southampton |
| 1952–53 | Arsenal |
| 1953–54 | West Ham United |
| 1954–55 | Southampton |
| 1966–67 | Leicester/Tottenham jointly |
| 1967–68 | Arsenal |
| 1968–69 | Southampton |
| 1969–70 | Arsenal |
| 2008–09 | Crystal Palace, Reading |

== See also ==
- The Central League
- Premier Reserve League
- Football League Youth Alliance
- The Football League
