= 1916–17 Brentford F.C. season =

English football team season

Brentford
1916–17 season
- Chairman: H. Jason-Saunders
- Secretary-Manager: Fred Halliday
- Stadium: Griffin Park
- London Combination: 12th
- Top goalscorer: League: White (20); All: White (20)
- Highest home attendance: 3,500
- Lowest home attendance: 1,000

During the 1916–17 English football season, Brentford competed in the London Combination, due to the cessation of competitive football for the duration of the First World War. Restricted by league rules mandating that all players must be members of the armed forces or munitions workers, Brentford finished third-from-bottom, having been forced to field over 50 guest players.

== Season summary ==
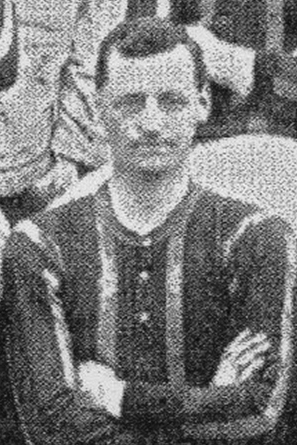
Former Brentford forward Patrick Hagan was killed during the Battle of the Somme in July 1916.

Straddling the middle period the First World War, the London Combination introduced a new rule that for the 1916–17 season, stating all players must be members of the armed forces or munitions workers, which meant Brentford secretary-manager Fred Halliday (himself a worker at the Ministry of Munitions) had trouble securing players to play. Full back Dusty Rhodes, half back Alf Amos and forwards Patsy Hendren and Henry White would be the only pre-war Bees players to appear in more than half of the matches during the season. Albert Chester joined the club from Millwall in December 1916 and also appeared in over half the matches. Due to a wrist injury suffered by Ted Price, Bradford Park Avenue's Frank Drabble was the main goalkeeper during the season, while Croydon Common's William Bushell was also a regular in the half back line.

Brentford had a torrid season, winning just 9 of the 40 matches. Defeats by three, four, five and six goal margins were a regular occurrence, contributing to a total of 99 goals conceded during the campaign. 16 goals were conceded in four matches versus Luton Town. The highlights were a 7–0 victory over Portsmouth at Griffin Park on 30 December 1916 and Henry White's performances, who top-scored for the third-consecutive season with 20 goals from 35 matches.

The Battle of the Somme, which began on 1 July 1916, represented the lowest period so far for the British Army during the war and a number of former Brentford players were killed in the battle:

- Lieutenant Thomas Hamer, killed during the Battle of Mametz on 7 July 1916, while serving with the Royal Welch Fusiliers.
- Sergeant Patrick Hagan, killed during the Battle of Bazentin Ridge on 14 July 1916, while serving with the Royal Scots.
- Private John Hendren, killed during the Battle of Delville Wood on 27 July 1916, while serving with the Royal Fusiliers.
- Privates Louis D'Abadie and Henry Purver, killed during the Battle of Delville Wood on 31 July 1916, while serving with the Royal Fusiliers.
- Private Harry Robotham, killed during the Battle of Flers–Courcelette on 12 September 1916, while serving with the Middlesex Regiment.
- Private Percy Matthews, missing, presumed killed, during the Battle of Le Transloy on 12 October 1916, while serving with the Essex Regiment.
- Sergeant Joshua Hardisty MM, killed during the Battle of the Ancre on 18 November 1916, while serving with the Border Regiment.

Two other players died during the season:

- Lieutenant Alex Glen, who played at inside left during the 1908–09 season, was serving into the Royal Army Medical Corps when he committed suicide while in camp in Ripon, Yorkshire on 21 September 1916.
- Sergeant Henry Cook, died of wounds suffered near Maurepas, France, on 9 January 1917, while serving with the Yorkshire Regiment. He had appeared as a guest during the 1915–16 season.

== League table ==
=== London Combination ===
Pos	Team	Pld	W	D	L	GF	GA	GR	Pts
11	Watford	39	8	9	22	69	115	0.600	25
12	Brentford	40	9	7	24	56	99	0.566	25
13	Portsmouth	40	9	4	27	58	117	0.496	22

Source: Football and the First World War

== Results ==
Brentford's goal tally listed first.

=== Legend ===
Win	Draw	Loss

=== London Combination ===
No.	Date	Opponent	Venue	Result	Scorer(s)
1	2 September 1916	Crystal Palace	A	0–4	
2	9 September 1916	Southampton	H	1–1	Kirby
3	16 September 1916	Chelsea	H	0–3	
4	23 September 1916	Arsenal	A	0–0	
5	30 September 1916	Luton Town	H	1–3	Hendren (pen)
6	7 October 1916	Reading	A	2–0	Gregson (2)
7	14 October 1916	Millwall	H	0–3	
8	21 October 1916	Watford	A	2–4	Sloley, White
9	28 October 1916	Clapton Orient	H	3–0	White, Gregson, Clarkson
10	4 November 1916	Fulham	A	0–2	
11	11 November 1916	Queens Park Rangers	H	1–4	Sloley
12	18 November 1916	West Ham United	A	0–4	
13	25 November 1916	Crystal Palace	H	3–1	White, Sloley, Kirby
14	2 December 1916	Southampton	A	1–3	Hendren
15	9 December 1916	Chelsea	A	2–7	White, Hendren
16	23 December 1916	Luton Town	A	2–5	Bushell, Chester
17	25 December 1916	Tottenham Hotspur	H	1–5	White
18	26 December 1916	Tottenham Hotspur	A	2–5	White, Spencer
19	30 December 1916	Portsmouth	H	7–0	White, Sloley, Hendren, Clarkson
20	6 January 1917	Millwall	A	0–3	
21	13 January 1917	Watford	H	4–1	Sloley, White (2), Clarkson
22	20 January 1917	Clapton Orient	A	2–5	White (2)
23	27 January 1917	Fulham	H	1–1	Dillimore
24	3 February 1917	Queens Park Rangers	A	0–2	
25	10 February 1917	West Ham United	H	1–1	Gregson
26	17 February 1917	Millwall	A	3–2	Chester, Dillimore, White
27	24 February 1917	Fulham	H	1–4	Dillimore
28	3 March 1917	Chelsea	H	3–0	Gregson, White (2)
29	10 March 1917	Watford	A	2–5	White, Hendren
30	17 March 1917	Luton Town	H	1–2	Hendren
31	24 March 1917	Queens Park Rangers	A	2–2	Hendren, Dillimore
32	31 March 1917	Millwall	H	1–3	Dillimore
33	6 April 1917	West Ham United	A	0–2	
34	7 April 1917	Fulham	A	2–0	Keenor, Gregson
35	9 April 1917	West Ham United	H	1–2	Hendren (pen)
36	14 April 1917	Chelsea	A	2–3	Hendren (2, 1 pen)
37	19 April 1917	Queens Park Rangers	H	0–0	
38	21 April 1917	Watford	H	2–1	White (2)
39	26 April 1917	Arsenal	H	0–0	
40	28 April 1917	Luton Town	A	0–6	

- Source: 100 Years of Brentford

== Playing squad ==
Players' ages are as of the opening day of the 1916–17 season.

Pos.	Name	Nat.	Date of birth (age)	Signed from	Signed in	Notes
Goalkeepers
GK	Ted Price	(England)	13 June 1883 (aged 33)	Croydon Common	1912	
Defenders
DF	George Curtis	(England)	22 October 1888 (aged 27)	Kingston upon Thames	1914	
DF	Jack Peart	(England)	13 October 1884 (aged 31)	Croydon Common	1916	
DF	Dusty Rhodes (c)	(England)	16 August 1882 (aged 34)	Sunderland	1908	Trainer
Midfielders
HB	Charles Allwright	(England)	11 June 1888 (aged 28)	Kingston upon Thames	1914	
HB	Alf Amos	(England)	9 February 1893 (aged 23)	Old Kingstonians	1913	
HB	Alec Barclay	(England)	1 November 1885 (aged 30)	Ilford	1910	Amateur
HB	Bertie Rosier	(England)	21 March 1893 (aged 23)	Southall	1913	
Forwards
FW	Herbert Allwright	(England)	4 March 1892 (aged 24)	Unattached	1915	
FW	Walter Chalk	(England)	10 July 1885 (aged 31)	Old Kingstonians	1915	Amateur
FW	Albert Chester	(England)	17 March 1886 (aged 30)	Millwall	1916	
FW	Patsy Hendren	(England)	5 February 1889 (aged 27)	Queens Park Rangers	1911	Played when his cricket commitments allowed
FW	Richard Sloley	(England)	20 August 1891 (aged 25)	Cambridge University	1914	Amateur
FW	Henry White	(England)	8 August 1895 (aged 21)	Whamcliffe Athletic	1913	Amateur
Guest players
GK	Frank Drabble	(England)	8 July 1888 (aged 28)	Bradford Park Avenue	1916	Guest from Bradford Park Avenue
GK	A. Harvey	n/a	n/a	n/a	1916	Guest
GK	Jimmy Morris	(England)	n/a	Clapton Orient	1917	Guest from Clapton Orient
GK	Bernard Neville	(England)	9 July 1882 (aged 34)	Unattached	1916	Guest, referee
DF	Fred Bullock	(England)	1 July 1886 (aged 30)	Huddersfield Town	1916	Guest from Huddersfield Town
DF	Walker Hampson	(England)	24 July 1889 (aged 27)	Burnley	1916	Guest from Burnley
DF	Ted Hanney	(England)	19 January 1889 (aged 27)	Manchester City	1917	Guest from Manchester City
DF	Kennedy	n/a	n/a	n/a	1916	Guest
DF	J. Mason	n/a	n/a	n/a	1917	Guest
DF	H. W. Skinner	(England)	n/a	Nunhead	1916	Amateur, guest from Nunhead
HB	Birtwhistle	n/a	n/a	n/a	1916	Guest
HB	William Bushell	(England)	30 June 1880 (aged 36)	Croydon Common	1916	Guest from Croydon Common
HB	J. Carter	n/a	n/a	n/a	1917	Guest
HB	Henry Caves	(England)	28 November 1891 (aged 24)	Hampstead Town	1916	Amateur, guest from Hampstead Town
HB	A. Davis	n/a	n/a	n/a	1917	Guest
HB	Charles Hollidge	(England)	14 October 1881 (aged 34)	Croydon Common	1916	Guest from Croydon Common
HB	George Hunter	(England)	1 June 1885 (aged 31)	Manchester United	1916	Guest from Manchester United
HB	Fred Keenor	(Wales)	31 July 1894 (aged 22)	Cardiff City	1916	Guest from Cardiff City
HB	John Lamb	(England)	25 July 1889 (aged 27)	The Wednesday	1916	Guest from The Wednesday
HB	James Lockwood	(England)	20 February 1887 (aged 29)	Queens Park Rangers	1916	Guest from Queens Park Rangers
HB	C. Morris	n/a	n/a	n/a	1917	Guest
HB	Robert Nash	(England)	n/a	Unattached	1917	Guest
HB	S. Nunn	n/a	n/a	n/a	1917	Guest
HB	Frank Roberts	(England)	3 April 1894 (aged 22)	Bolton Wanderers	1916	Guest from Bolton Wanderers
HB	J. Smith	n/a	n/a	n/a	1917	Guest
HB	Billy Thompson	(England)	August 1886 (aged 30)	Queens Park Rangers	1916	Guest from Queens Park Rangers
HB	B. Toms	n/a	n/a	Luton Town	1917	Guest from Luton Town
FW	Tommy Barber	(England)	22 July 1886 (aged 30)	Aston Villa	1917	Guest from Aston Villa
FW	Bill Blackmore	(England)	17 May 1891 (aged 25)	Southampton	1916	Guest from Southampton
FW	Billy Brawn	(England)	1 August 1878 (aged 38)	Unattached	1916	Guest
FW	David Chalmers	(Scotland)	22 July 1891 (aged 25)	Grimsby Town	1917	Guest from Grimsby Town
FW	Billy Clarkson	(England)	22 September 1891 (aged 24)	Burnley	1916	Guest from Burnley
FW	J. Cooper	n/a	n/a	n/a	1917	Guest
FW	Harold Crockford	(England)	25 September 1893 (aged 22)	Chatham Town	1916	Guest from Chatham Town
FW	Bertie Denyer	(England)	9 April 1893 (aged 23)	Swindon Town	1917	Guest from Swindon Town
FW	Ernie Dilley	(England)	5 June 1896 (aged 20)	Millwall	1917	Guest from Millwall
FW	James Dillimore	(England)	19 December 1894 (aged 21)	Unattached	1917	Guest
FW	Fawcett	n/a	n/a	n/a	1916	Guest
FW	Thomas Graham	(England)	20 July 1887 (aged 29)	Castleford Town	1916	Guest from Castleford Town
FW	Alf Gregson	(England)	2 March 1889 (aged 27)	Grimsby Town	1916	Guest from Grimsby Town
FW	Frederick Groves	(England)	13 January 1891 (aged 25)	Woolwich Arsenal	1916	Guest from Woolwich Arsenal
FW	Henry Hogarth	(England)	14 April 1888 (aged 28)	Unattached	1917	Guest
FW	Bill Hooper	(England)	20 February 1884 (aged 32)	Southport Central	1917	Guest from Southport Central
FW	E. A. Hunt	n/a	n/a	n/a	1917	Guest
FW	William Kirby	(England)	21 June 1883 (aged 33)	Croydon Common	1916	Guest from Croydon Common
FW	J. Macey	n/a	n/a	n/a	1917	Guest
FW	H. Palmer	n/a	n/a	n/a	1916	Guest
FW	W. Shaw	n/a	n/a	n/a	1916	Guest
FW	Alfred Spencer	(England)	n/a	Clapton Orient	1916	Guest from Clapton Orient
FW	Dan Tuckfield	n/a	n/a	Millwall	1917	Guest from Millwall
FW	F. Walker	n/a	n/a	n/a	1916	Guest
FW	Oliver Whittemore	(England)	24 August 1894 (aged 22)	Luton Town	1917	Guest from Luton Town
FW	J. Wood	n/a	n/a	Luton Town	1917	Guest from Luton Town

- Sources: 100 Years of Brentford, Timeless Bees, Football League Players' Records 1888 to 1939

== Coaching staff ==
Name	Role
(England) Fred Halliday	Secretary-Manager
(England) Dusty Rhodes	Trainer

== Statistics ==
=== Appearances and goals ===

Brentford's highest appearance-makers in each position during the London Combination season.

Pos	Nat	Name	Total	
Pos	Nat	Name	Apps	Goals
GK	(England)	Ted Price	9	0
DF	(England)	George Curtis	6	0
DF	(England)	Jack Peart	9	0
DF	(England)	Dusty Rhodes	32	0
HB	(England)	Bertie Rosier	8	0
HB	(England)	Charles Allwright	6	0
HB	(England)	Alf Amos	22	0
HB	(England)	Alec Barclay	5	0
FW	(England)	Herbert Allwright	2	0
FW	(England)	Walter Chalk	2	0
FW	(England)	Albert Chester	23	2
FW	(England)	Patsy Hendren	39	10
FW	(England)	Richard Sloley	9	5
FW	(England)	Henry White	35	20
Players guested during the season
GK	(England)	Frank Drabble	24	0
GK	n/a	A. Harvey	1	0
GK	(England)	Jimmy Morris	5	0
GK	(England)	Bernard Neville	1	0
DF	(England)	Fred Bullock	11	0
DF	(England)	Walker Hampson	3	0
DF	(England)	Ted Hanney	3	0
DF	n/a	Kennedy	1	0
DF	n/a	J. Mason	1	0
DF	n/a	H. W. Skinner	5	0
HB	n/a	Birtwhistle	1	0
HB	(England)	William Bushell	22	1
HB	n/a	J. Carter	1	0
HB	(England)	Henry Caves	1	0
HB	n/a	A. Davis	4	0
HB	(England)	Charles Hollidge	2	0
HB	(England)	George Hunter	1	0
HB	(Wales)	Fred Keenor	13	1
HB	(England)	John Lamb	3	0
HB	n/a	James Lockwood	10	0
HB	n/a	C. Morris	3	0
HB	(England)	Robert Nash	1	0
HB	n/a	S. Nunn	1	0
HB	(England)	Frank Roberts	10	0
FW	n/a	J. Smith	2	0
HB	(England)	Billy Thompson	1	0
HB	n/a	B. Toms	1	0
FW	(England)	Tommy Barber	2	0
FW	(England)	Bill Blackmore	1	0
FW	(England)	Billy Brawn	2	0
FW	(Scotland)	David Chalmers	1	0
FW	(England)	Billy Clarkson	16	3
FW	n/a	J. Cooper	1	0
FW	(England)	Harold Crockford	3	0
FW	(England)	Bertie Denyer	1	0
FW	(England)	Ernie Dilley	2	0
FW	(England)	James Dillimore	12	5
FW	n/a	Fawcett	1	0
FW	(England)	Thomas Graham	3	0
FW	(England)	Alf Gregson	11	6
FW	(England)	Frederick Groves	1	0
FW	(England)	Henry Hogarth	2	0
FW	(England)	Bill Hooper	4	0
FW	n/a	E. A. Hunt	1	0
FW	(England)	William Kirby	18	2
FW	n/a	J. Macey	2	0
FW	n/a	H. Palmer	1	0
FW	n/a	W. Shaw	1	0
FW	(England)	Alfred Spencer	1	1
FW	n/a	Dan Tuckfield	1	0
FW	n/a	F. Walker	11	0
FW	(England)	Oliver Whittemore	1	0
FW	n/a	J. Wood	1	0

- Players listed in italics left the club mid-season.
- Source: 100 Years of Brentford

=== Goalscorers ===
Pos.	Nat	Player	Total
FW	(England)	Henry White	20
FW	(England)	Patsy Hendren	10
FW	(England)	Alf Gregson	6
FW	(England)	James Dillimore	5
FW	(England)	Richard Sloley	5
FW	(England)	Billy Clarkson	3
FW	(England)	Albert Chester	2
FW	(England)	William Kirby	2
HB	(England)	William Bushell	1
HB	(Wales)	Fred Keenor	1
FW	(England)	Alfred Spencer	1
Total			56

- Players listed in italics left the club mid-season.
- Source: 100 Years of Brentford

=== Management ===
Name	Nat	From	To	Record				
Name	Nat	From	To	P	W	D	L	W %
Fred Halliday	(England)	2 September 1916	28 April 1917	40	9	7	24	22.50|

=== Summary ===
Games played	40
Games won	9
Games drawn	7
Games lost	24
Goals scored	56
Goals conceded	99
Clean sheets	8
Biggest win	7–0 versus Portsmouth, 30 December 1916
Worst defeat	6–0 versus Luton Town, 28 April 1917
Most appearances	39, Patsy Hendren
Top scorer	20, Henry White

== Transfers & loans ==
Guest players' arrival and departure dates correspond to their first and last appearances of the season.

Players transferred in
Date	Pos.	Name	Previous club	Fee	Ref.
2 September 1916	DF	(England) Jack Peart	(England) Croydon Common	Free	
9 December 1916	FW	(England) Albert Chester	(England) Millwall	Free	
Guest players in
Date from	Pos.	Name	Previous club	Date to	Ref.
2 September 1916	HB	(England) Henry Caves	(England) Hampstead Town	2 September 1916	
2 September 1916	FW	(England) Billy Clarkson	(England) Burnley	19 April 1917	
2 September 1916	FW	(England) Thomas Graham	(England) Castleford Town	21 October 1916	
2 September 1916	FW	(England) William Kirby	(England) Croydon Common	20 January 1917	
9 September 1916	FW	(England) Billy Brawn	Unattached	25 November 1916	
9 September 1916	HB	(England) William Bushell	(England) Croydon Common	17 March 1917	
9 September 1916	FW	F. Walker	n/a	20 January 1917	
16 September 1916	FW	(England) Harold Crockford	(England) Chatham Town	30 September 1916	
23 September 1916	GK	(England) Frank Drabble	(England) Bradford Park Avenue	26 April 1917	
7 October 1916	DF	(England) Fred Bullock	(England) Huddersfield Town	End of season	
7 October 1916	FW	(England) Alf Gregson	(England) Grimsby Town	26 April 1917	
7 October 1916	HB	(Wales) Fred Keenor	(Wales) Cardiff City	26 April 1917	
21 October 1916	FW	W. Shaw	n/a	21 October 1916	
21 October 1916	HB	(England) Billy Thompson	(England) Queens Park Rangers	21 October 1916	
18 November 1916	FW	Birtwhistle	n/a	18 November 1916	
18 November 1916	FW	(England) Frederick Groves	(England) Woolwich Arsenal	18 November 1916	
18 November 1916	DF	Kennedy	n/a	18 November 1916	
18 November 1916	HB	(England) John Lamb	(England) The Wednesday	14 April 1917	
2 December 1916	FW	(England) Bill Blackmore	(England) Southampton	2 December 1916	
2 December 1916	FW	Fawcett	n/a	2 December 1916	
2 December 1916	HB	(England) George Hunter	(England) Manchester United	2 December 1916	
2 December 1916	HB	(England) Frank Roberts	(England) Bolton Wanderers	17 February 1917	
9 December 1916	DF	(England) H. W. Skinner	(England) Nunhead	31 March 1917	
23 December 1916	DF	(England) Walker Hampson	(England) Burnley	26 December 1916	
23 December 1916	GK	A. Harvey	n/a	23 December 1916	
23 December 1916	HB	(England) Charles Hollidge	(England) Croydon Common	25 December 1916	
23 December 1916	FW	H. Palmer	n/a	23 December 1916	
25 December 1916	HB	(England) James Lockwood	(England) Queens Park Rangers	24 March 1917	
26 December 1916	FW	(England) Albert Spencer	(England) Clapton Orient	26 December 1916	
13 January 1917	GK	(England) Bernard Neville	Unattached	13 January 1917	
27 January 1917	FW	(England) James Dillimore	n/a	21 April 1917	
3 February 1917	FW	(England) Bertie Denyer	(England) Swindon Town	3 February 1917	
17 February 1917	HB	A. Davis	n/a	9 April 1917	
17 February 1917	FW	J. Smith	(England) Luton Town	End of season	
17 February 1917	FW	Dan Tuckfield	(England) Millwall	17 February 1917	
17 March 1917	GK	(England) Jimmy Morris	(England) Clapton Orient	End of season	
24 March 1917	FW	(England) Ernie Dilley	(England) Millwall	31 March 1917	
24 March 1917	DF	J. Mason	n/a	24 March 1917	
24 March 1917	HB	S. Nunn	n/a	24 March 1917	
31 March 1917	HB	J. Carter	n/a	31 March 1917	
31 March 1917	FW	(England) Henry Hogarth	Unattached	14 April 1917	
31 March 1917	FW	J. Macey	n/a	6 April 1917	
9 April 1917	FW	J. Cooper	n/a	9 April 1917	
14 April 1917	FW	(England) Tommy Barber	(England) Aston Villa	26 April 1917	
14 April 1917	DF	(England) Ted Hanney	(England) Manchester City	End of season	
14 April 1917	FW	E. A. Hunt	n/a	14 April 1917	
19 April 1917	FW	(Scotland) David Chalmers	(England) Grimsby Town	19 April 1917	
19 April 1917	FW	(England) Bill Hooper	(England) Southport Central	End of season	
21 April 1917	HB	C. Morris	n/a	End of season	
26 April 1917	HB	(England) Robert Nash	Unattached	26 April 1917	
28 April 1917	HB	B. Toms	(England) Luton Town	End of season	
28 April 1917	FW	J. Wood	(England) Luton Town	End of season	
Guest players out
Date from	Pos.	Name	To	Date to	Ref.
1916	HB	(Scotland) Jimmy Kennedy	(Scotland) Airdrieonians	1917	
