= 1915–16 Brentford F.C. season =

English football team season

Brentford
1915–16 season
- Chairman: H. Jason-Saunders
- Secretary-Manager: Fred Halliday
- Stadium: Griffin Park
- London Combination Principle Tournament: 7th
- London Combination Supplementary Tournament: 8th
- Top goalscorer: League: White (13); All: White (13)
- Highest home attendance: 5,000
- Lowest home attendance: 1,000

During the 1915–16 English football season, Brentford competed in the London Combination. In the first season of non-competitive wartime football during the First World War, the Bees finished in mid-table in each of the leagues run by the London Combination.

== Season summary ==
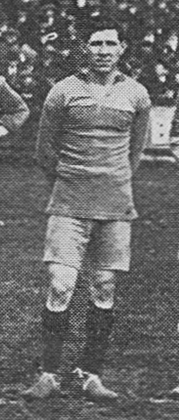
Future Cardiff City captain Fred Keenor guested for Brentford in each wartime season.

Having ended the 1914–15 Southern League Second Division season £7,000 in debt (equivalent to £622,200 in 2025), the suspension of competitive football due to the ongoing First World War proved to be a blessing for Brentford. The club was given the chance to face Football League clubs Chelsea, Tottenham Hotspur, Arsenal, Clapton Orient and Fulham in the wartime London Combination. Professionalism had also been abolished, meaning that the club needed only to pay its players their expenses. In addition, the clubs of the London Combination were predominantly London-based, meaning those expenses would be lower than that of previous seasons. The squad had been decimated by the entry of players into the Army or munitions work, which meant that only goalkeeper Ted Price, full backs Dusty Rhodes and Bertie Rosier, half back Alf Amos and forwards Patsy Hendren and Henry White played in the majority of Brentford's matches during the season. White top-scored with 13 goals.

Brentford began the London Combination's Principle Tournament strongly, losing just one of the first 10 matches, but the departure of the locally based Football Battalion to the Western Front robbed the club of a source of quality guest players. Local amateurs, guests and soldiers were brought in to plug gaps in the team. A few guests made notable contributions during the season, including Swindon Town's Bertie Denyer (9 goals in 9 appearances) and Middlesbrough's Dick Wynn (8 goals in 20 appearances). Middlesbrough proved to be a ready source of players, with former Brentford full back Joe Hisbent, half backs Henry Cook, George Malcolm and forward Harry Chapelhow guesting. Brentford finished the London Combination's two league competitions in mid-table, with the highlights being two West London derby wins versus Queens Park Rangers and wins over Football League clubs Clapton Orient, Arsenal and neighbours Fulham.

Three former Brentford players died during the season:

- Forward John Bayne, an occasional player at the turn of the century, was serving as a private in the Black Watch when he was killed by a rifle grenade at Richebourg-Saint-Vaast on 21 July 1915.
- Edwin Farrow was serving as a sub-lieutenant in the Royal Naval Division when he was killed by a stray bullet at Gallipoli on 25 August 1915.
- Former inside right Alex Walker was serving as a private in the Royal Scots when he died of tuberculosis in Scotland on 12 May 1916.

== League tables ==
=== London Combination Principle Tournament ===
| Pos | Team | Pld | W | D | L | GF | GA | GR | Pts |
|---|---|---|---|---|---|---|---|---|---|
| 6 | Tottenham Hotspur | 22 | 8 | 8 | 6 | 38 | 35 | 1.086 | 24 |
| 7 | Brentford | 22 | 6 | 8 | 8 | 36 | 40 | 0.900 | 20 |
| 8 | Queens Park Rangers | 22 | 8 | 3 | 11 | 27 | 41 | 0.659 | 19 |

Source: Football and the First World War

=== London Combination Supplementary Tournament ===
| Pos | Team | Pld | W | D | L | GF | GA | GR | Pts |
|---|---|---|---|---|---|---|---|---|---|
| 7 | Watford | 14 | 5 | 3 | 6 | 22 | 20 | 1.100 | 13 |
| 8 | Brentford | 14 | 5 | 2 | 7 | 29 | 33 | 0.879 | 12 |
| 9 | Croydon Common | 14 | 4 | 3 | 7 | 28 | 27 | 1.037 | 11 |

Source: Football and the First World War

== Results ==
Brentford's goal tally listed first.

=== Legend ===
| Win | Draw | Loss |

=== London Combination Principle Tournament ===
| No. | Date | Opponent | Venue | Result | Scorer(s) |
|---|---|---|---|---|---|
| 1 | 4 September 1915 | West Ham United | H | 2–1 | Powell, F. Price |
| 2 | 11 September 1915 | Tottenham Hotspur | A | 1–1 | Sloley |
| 3 | 18 September 1915 | Crystal Palace | H | 1–0 | Keenor |
| 4 | 25 September 1915 | Queens Park Rangers | A | 2–1 | F. Price, Gregson |
| 5 | 2 October 1915 | Fulham | H | 2–2 | White, Sloley |
| 6 | 9 October 1915 | Clapton Orient | A | 3–1 | Sloley (3) |
| 7 | 16 October 1915 | Watford | H | 1–2 | Sloley (pen) |
| 8 | 23 October 1915 | Millwall | A | 3–3 | Gregson, White, Wynn |
| 9 | 30 October 1915 | Croydon Common | H | 2–1 | Allman (og), Sloley |
| 10 | 6 November 1915 | Arsenal | A | 1–3 | Shaw (og) |
| 11 | 13 November 1915 | West Ham United | A | 1–4 | Hooper |
| 12 | 20 November 1915 | Tottenham Hotspur | H | 1–1 | Wynn |
| 13 | 27 November 1915 | Crystal Palace | A | 0–1 | |
| 14 | 4 December 1915 | Queens Park Rangers | H | 4–0 | White, Hendren (2), Wynn |
| 15 | 11 December 1915 | Fulham | A | 3–4 | White (2), Wynn |
| 16 | 18 December 1915 | Clapton Orient | H | 1–1 | Denyer |
| 17 | 25 December 1915 | Chelsea | H | 1–2 | G. Curtis |
| 18 | 27 December 1915 | Chelsea | A | 1–4 | Malcolm |
| 19 | 1 January 1916 | Watford | A | 1–3 | Denyer |
| 20 | 8 January 1916 | Millwall | H | 1–1 | Wynn |
| 21 | 15 January 1916 | Croydon Common | A | 2–2 | Denyer (2) |
| 22 | 22 January 1916 | Arsenal | H | 2–2 | Chapelhow, Denyer |

=== London Combination Supplementary Tournament ===
| No. | Date | Opponent | Venue | Result | Scorer(s) |
|---|---|---|---|---|---|
| 1 | 5 February 1916 | Luton Town | A | 3–4 | White (2), Hendren |
| 2 | 12 February 1916 | Arsenal | H | 2–1 | Denyer, White |
| 3 | 19 February 1916 | Queens Park Rangers | A | 1–1 | Wynn |
| 4 | 4 March 1916 | West Ham United | A | 2–4 | Denyer (2) |
| 5 | 11 March 1916 | Croydon Common | H | 3–1 | Amos, Gordon, Hooper |
| 6 | 18 March 1916 | Arsenal | A | 2–5 | Denyer, Hooper |
| 7 | 25 March 1916 | Queens Park Rangers | H | 4–0 | Wynn, Hooper (2), Sloley |
| 8 | 1 April 1916 | Crystal Palace | A | 3–6 | Sloley (2), Hendren |
| 9 | 8 April 1916 | West Ham United | H | 1–3 | White |
| 10 | 15 April 1916 | Croydon Common | A | 0–0 | |
| 11 | 21 April 1916 | Fulham | H | 2–1 | White, Wynn, (pen) |
| 12 | 24 April 1916 | Fulham | A | 0–1 | |
| 13 | 29 April 1916 | Luton Town | H | 0–3 | |
| 14 | 6 May 1916 | Crystal Palace | H | 6–3 | Knight (2, 1 pen), White (3), Trumper |

- Source: 100 Years Of Brentford

== Playing squad ==
Players' ages are as of the opening day of the 1915–16 season.

| Pos. | Name | Nat. | Date of birth (age) | Signed from | Signed in | Notes |
Goalkeepers
| GK | Ted Price | (England) | 13 June 1883 (aged 32) | Croydon Common | 1912 | |
Defenders
| DF | Dusty Rhodes (c) | (England) | 16 August 1882 (aged 33) | Sunderland | 1908 | Trainer |
| DF | Bertie Rosier | (England) | 21 March 1893 (aged 22) | Southall | 1913 | |
Midfielders
| HB | Charles Allwright | (England) | 11 June 1888 (aged 27) | Kingston-on-Thames | 1914 | |
| HB | Alf Amos | (England) | 9 February 1893 (aged 22) | Old Kingstonians | 1913 | |
| HB | George Curtis | (England) | 22 October 1888 (aged 26) | Kingston-on-Thames | 1914 | |
| HB | Mick O'Brien | (Ireland) | 10 August 1893 (aged 22) | Celtic | 1915 | |
Forwards
| FW | Herbert Allwright | (England) | 4 March 1892 (aged 23) | Unattached | 1915 | |
| FW | Walter Chalk | (England) | 10 July 1885 (aged 30) | Old Kingstonians | 1915 | Amateur |
| FW | Patsy Hendren | (England) | 5 February 1889 (aged 26) | Queens Park Rangers | 1911 | Played when his cricket commitments allowed |
| FW | Charles Hibbert | (England) | 25 January 1894 (aged 21) | Uxbridge | 1914 | Amateur |
| FW | Frank Price | (England) | 28 February 1885 (aged 30) | Shepherds Bush | 1914 | |
| FW | Alfred Rosier | (England) | 6 September 1888 (aged 26) | Unattached | 1915 | Amateur |
| FW | Richard Sloley | (England) | 20 August 1891 (aged 24) | Cambridge University | 1914 | Amateur |
| FW | Henry White | (England) | 8 August 1895 (aged 20) | Whamcliffe Athletic | 1913 | Amateur |
Guest players
| GK | W. Griffiths | n/a | n/a | West Ham United | 1916 | Guest from West Ham United |
| DF | Joe Hisbent | (England) | 29 December 1881 (aged 33) | Middlesbrough | 1915 | Guest from Middlesbrough |
| DF | Fred Keenor | (Wales) | 31 July 1894 (aged 21) | Cardiff City | 1915 | Guest from Cardiff City |
| HB | Henry Cook | (England) | 23 October 1893 (aged 21) | Middlesbrough | 1915 | Guest from Middlesbrough |
| HB | Walter Hatherall | (England) | 22 April 1894 (aged 21) | n/a | 1916 | Guest |
| HB | Fred Jepson | (England) | 20 December 1889 (aged 25) | Spennymoor United | 1915 | Guest from Spennymoor United |
| HB | John Lamb | (England) | 25 July 1889 (aged 26) | The Wednesday | 1915 | Guest from The Wednesday |
| HB | George Malcolm | (England) | 20 June 1889 (aged 26) | Middlesbrough | 1915 | Guest from Middlesbrough |
| HB | Billy Matthews | (Wales) | 1881 (aged 33–34) | Chester | 1915 | Guest from Chester |
| HB | Archie Mitchell | (England) | 15 December 1885 (aged 29) | Queens Park Rangers | 1916 | Guest from Queens Park Rangers |
| HB | F. Stuckey | n/a | n/a | Old Kingstonians | 1916 | Amateur, guest from Old Kingstonians |
| HB | Billy Wake | (England) | 5 January 1886 (aged 29) | Queens Park Rangers | 1916 | Guest from Queens Park Rangers |
| FW | George Bowler | (England) | 23 January 1890 (aged 25) | Tottenham Hotspur | 1915 | Guest from Tottenham Hotspur |
| FW | J. Champion | n/a | n/a | n/a | 1916 | Guest |
| FW | Harry Chapelhow | (England) | 6 March 1885 (aged 30) | Penrith | 1916 | Guest from Penrith |
| FW | Billy Clarkson | (England) | 22 September 1891 (aged 23) | Burnley | 1915 | Guest from Burnley |
| FW | Jack Curtis | (England) | 13 December 1888 (aged 26) | Stockport County | 1915 | Guest from Stockport County |
| FW | Bertie Denyer | (England) | 9 April 1893 (aged 22) | Swindon Town | 1915 | Guest from Swindon Town |
| FW | Arthur Featherstone | (England) | n/a | n/a | 1915 | Guest |
| FW | Charlie Freeman | (England) | 22 August 1887 (aged 28) | Chelsea | 1915 | Guest from Chelsea |
| FW | T. Gordon | n/a | n/a | n/a | 1916 | Guest |
| FW | Alf Gregson | (England) | 2 March 1889 (aged 26) | Grimsby Town | 1915 | Guest from Grimsby Town |
| FW | Bill Hooper | (England) | 20 February 1884 (aged 31) | Southport Central | 1915 | Guest from Southport Central |
| FW | William Knight | (England) | 10 February 1877 (aged 38) | Steel Barrel Works | 1916 | Guest from Steel Barrel Works |
| FW | J. Newman | n/a | n/a | n/a | 1916 | Guest |
| FW | Bert Powell | (England) | 23 November 1886 (aged 28) | Boscombe | 1915 | Guest from Boscombe |
| FW | William Steer | (England) | 10 October 1888 (aged 26) | Chelsea | 1915 | Guest from Chelsea |
| FW | Henry Trumper | (England) | 23 November 1889 (aged 25) | Unattached | 1916 | Guest |
| FW | Dick Wynn | (England) | 1892 (aged 22–23) | Middlesbrough | 1915 | Guest from Middlesbrough |

- Sources: 100 Years of Brentford, Timeless Bees, Football League Players' Records 1888 to 1939

== Coaching staff ==
| Name | Role |
|---|---|
| (England) Fred Halliday | Secretary-Manager |
| (England) Dusty Rhodes | Trainer |

== Statistics ==
=== Appearances and goals ===

Brentford's highest appearance-makers in each position during the London Combination season.

| Pos | Nat | Name | League (Principle) | | League (Suppl.) | | Total | |
| Pos | Nat | Name | Apps | Goals | Apps | Goals | Apps | Goals |
|---|---|---|---|---|---|---|---|---|
| GK | (England) | Ted Price | 22 | 0 | 13 | 0 | 35 | 0 |
| DF | (England) | Dusty Rhodes | 21 | 0 | 13 | 0 | 34 | 0 |
| DF | (England) | Bertie Rosier | 19 | 0 | 10 | 0 | 29 | 0 |
| HB | (England) | Charles Allwright | 7 | 0 | 1 | 0 | 8 | 0 |
| HB | (England) | Alf Amos | 13 | 0 | 10 | 1 | 23 | 1 |
| HB | (England) | George Curtis | 6 | 1 | 5 | 0 | 11 | 1 |
| HB | (Ireland) | Mick O'Brien | 3 | 0 | 0 | 0 | 3 | 0 |
| FW | (England) | Herbert Allwright | 1 | 0 | 0 | 0 | 1 | 0 |
| FW | (England) | Walter Chalk | 1 | 0 | 0 | 0 | 1 | 0 |
| FW | (England) | Patsy Hendren | 8 | 2 | 14 | 2 | 22 | 4 |
| FW | (England) | Charles Hibbert | 3 | 0 | 0 | 0 | 3 | 0 |
| FW | (England) | Frank Price | 4 | 2 | 0 | 0 | 4 | 2 |
| FW | (England) | Alfred Rosier | 3 | 0 | 4 | 0 | 7 | 0 |
| FW | (England) | Richard Sloley | 9 | 7 | 6 | 4 | 15 | 11 |
| FW | (England) | Henry White | 17 | 5 | 13 | 8 | 30 | 13 |
Players guested during the season
| GK | n/a | W. Griffiths | — | | 1 | 0 | 1 | 0 |
| DF | (England) | Joe Hisbent | 12 | 0 | 6 | 0 | 18 | 0 |
| DF | (Wales) | Fred Keenor | 5 | 1 | — | | 5 | 1 |
| HB | (England) | Henry Cook | 10 | 0 | 9 | 0 | 19 | 0 |
| HB | (England) | Walter Hatherall | — | | 2 | 0 | 2 | 0 |
| HB | (England) | Fred Jepson | 2 | 0 | 1 | 0 | 3 | 0 |
| HB | (England) | John Lamb | 6 | 0 | — | | 6 | 0 |
| HB | (England) | George Malcolm | 11 | 1 | 7 | 0 | 18 | 1 |
| HB | (Wales) | Billy Matthews | 1 | 0 | — | | 1 | 0 |
| HB | (England) | Archie Mitchell | — | | 1 | 0 | 1 | 0 |
| HB | n/a | F. Stuckey | — | | 1 | 0 | 1 | 0 |
| HB | (England) | Billy Wake | — | | 1 | 0 | 1 | 0 |
| FW | (England) | George Bowler | 2 | 0 | — | | 2 | 0 |
| FW | n/a | J. Champion | — | | 1 | 0 | 1 | 0 |
| FW | (England) | Harry Chapelhow | 2 | 1 | 10 | 0 | 12 | 1 |
| FW | (England) | Billy Clarkson | 7 | 0 | — | | 7 | 0 |
| FW | (England) | Jack Curtis | 13 | 0 | — | | 13 | 0 |
| FW | (England) | Bertie Denyer | 5 | 5 | 4 | 4 | 9 | 9 |
| FW | (England) | Arthur Featherstone | 1 | 0 | — | | 1 | 0 |
| FW | (England) | Charlie Freeman | 1 | 0 | — | | 1 | 0 |
| FW | n/a | T. Gordon | — | | 1 | 1 | 1 | 1 |
| FW | (England) | Alf Gregson | 4 | 2 | — | | 4 | 2 |
| FW | (England) | Bill Hooper | 5 | 1 | 6 | 3 | 11 | 4 |
| FW | (England) | William Knight | — | | 2 | 2 | 2 | 2 |
| FW | n/a | Newman | — | | 1 | 0 | 1 | 0 |
| FW | (England) | Bert Powell | 2 | 1 | 0 | 0 | 2 | 1 |
| FW | (England) | William Steer | 4 | 0 | — | | 4 | 0 |
| FW | (England) | Henry Trumper | — | | 3 | 1 | 3 | 1 |
| FW | (England) | Dick Wynn | 12 | 5 | 8 | 3 | 20 | 8 |

- Players listed in italics left the club mid-season.
- Source: 100 Years of Brentford

=== Goalscorers ===
| Pos. | Nat | Player | LCP | LCS | Total |
|---|---|---|---|---|---|
| FW | (England) | Henry White | 5 | 8 | 13 |
| FW | (England) | Richard Sloley | 7 | 4 | 11 |
| FW | (England) | Bertie Denyer | 5 | 4 | 9 |
| FW | (England) | Dick Wynn | 5 | 3 | 8 |
| FW | (England) | Bill Hooper | 1 | 3 | 5 |
| FW | (England) | Patsy Hendren | 2 | 2 | 4 |
| FW | (England) | Alf Gregson | 2 | — | 2 |
| FW | (England) | Frank Price | 2 | — | 2 |
| FW | (England) | William Knight | — | 2 | 2 |
| HB | (Wales) | Fred Keenor | 1 | — | 1 |
| FW | (England) | Bert Powell | 1 | — | 1 |
| FW | (England) | Harry Chapelhow | 1 | 0 | 1 |
| HB | (England) | George Curtis | 1 | 0 | 1 |
| HB | (England) | George Malcolm | 1 | 0 | 1 |
| FW | n/a | T. Gordon | — | 1 | 1 |
| FW | (England) | Henry Trumper | — | 1 | 1 |
| HB | (England) | Alf Amos | 0 | 1 | 1 |
| Opponents | | | 2 | 0 | 2 |
| Total | | | 36 | 29 | 65 |

- Players listed in italics left the club mid-season.
- Source: 100 Years of Brentford

=== Management ===
| Name | Nat | From | To | Record All Comps | | | | | Record League (Principle) | | | | | Record League (Suppl.) | | | | |
| Name | Nat | From | To | P | W | D | L | W % | P | W | D | L | W % | P | W | D | L | W % |
|---|---|---|---|---|---|---|---|---|---|---|---|---|---|---|---|---|---|---|
| Fred Halliday | (England) | 4 September 1915 | 6 May 1916 | 36 | 11 | 10 | 15 | 30.56| | 14 | 5 | 2 | 7 | 35.71| | 22 | 6 | 8 | 8 | 27.27 |

=== Summary ===
| Games played | 36 (22 London Combination Principle Tournament, 14 London Combination Supplementary Tournament) |
| Games won | 11 (5 London Combination Principle Tournament, 6 London Combination Supplementary Tournament) |
| Games drawn | 10 (2 London Combination Principle Tournament, 8 London Combination Supplementary Tournament) |
| Games lost | 15 (7 London Combination Principle Tournament, 8 London Combination Supplementary Tournament) |
| Goals scored | 65 (36 London Combination Principle Tournament, 29 London Combination Supplementary Tournament) |
| Goals conceded | 73 (40 London Combination Principle Tournament, 33 London Combination Supplementary Tournament) |
| Clean sheets | 4 (2 London Combination Principle Tournament, 2 London Combination Supplementary Tournament) |
| Biggest win | 4–0 on two occasions |
| Worst defeat | 3–0 versus Luton Town, 29 April 1916; 4–1 on two occasions; 5–2 versus Arsenal, 18 March 1916; 6–3 versus Crystal Palace, 1 April 1916 |
| Most appearances | 35, Ted Price (22 London Combination Principle Tournament, 13 London Combination Supplementary Tournament) |
| Top scorer | 13, Henry White |

== Transfers & loans ==
Guest players' arrival and departure dates correspond to their first and last appearances of the season.

Players transferred in
| Date | Pos. | Name | Previous club | Fee | Ref. |
|---|---|---|---|---|---|
| 4 December 1915 | FW | (England) Alfred Rosier | Unattached | Amateur | |
| n/a | HB | (Scotland) Jimmy Kennedy | (England) Watford | n/a | |
Guest players in
| Date from | Pos. | Name | Previous club | Date to | Ref. |
| 4 September 1915 | FW | (England) Jack Curtis | (England) Stockport County | 1 January 1916 | |
| 4 September 1915 | HB | (Wales) Fred Keenor | (Wales) Cardiff City | 9 October 1915 | |
| 4 September 1915 | FW | (England) Bert Powell | (England) Boscombe | 11 September 1915 | |
| 11 September 1915 | FW | (England) Billy Clarkson | (England) Burnley | 30 October 1915 | |
| 11 September 1915 | HB | (England) John Lamb | (England) The Wednesday | 30 October 1915 | |
| 25 September 1915 | FW | (England) Alf Gregson | (England) Grimsby Town | 23 October 1915 | |
| 16 October 1915 | FW | (England) William Steer | (England) Chelsea | 8 January 1916 | |
| 23 October 1915 | DF | (England) Joe Hisbent | (England) Middlesbrough | 21 April 1916 | |
| 23 October 1915 | HB | (England) George Malcolm | (England) Middlesbrough | 21 April 1916 | |
| 23 October 1915 | FW | (England) Dick Wynn | (England) Middlesbrough | 21 April 1916 | |
| 30 October 1915 | FW | (England) Arthur Featherstone | n/a | 30 October 1915 | |
| 6 November 1915 | HB | (England) Henry Cook | (England) Middlesbrough | 30 October 1915 | |
| 13 November 1915 | FW | (England) Bill Hooper | (England) Southport Central | 15 April 1916 | |
| 20 November 1915 | HB | (Wales) Billy Matthews | (England) Chester | 20 November 1915 | |
| 11 December 1915 | FW | (England) Bertie Denyer | (England) Swindon Town | 1 April 1916 | |
| 11 December 1915 | FW | (England) Charlie Freeman | (England) Chelsea | 11 December 1915 | |
| 25 December 1915 | FW | (England) George Bowler | (England) Tottenham Hotspur | 27 December 1915 | |
| 27 December 1915 | HB | (England) Fred Jepson | (England) Spennymoor United | 5 February 1916 | |
| 15 January 1916 | FW | (England) Harry Chapelhow | (England) Penrith | 29 April 1916 | |
| 19 February 1919 | FW | Newman | n/a | 19 February 1919 | |
| 11 March 1916 | FW | T. Gordon | n/a | 11 March 1916 | |
| 1 April 1916 | GK | W. Griffiths | (England) West Ham United | 1 April 1916 | |
| 1 April 1916 | HB | (England) Walter Hatherall | n/a | End of season | |
| 15 April 1916 | FW | (England) Henry Trumper | Unattached | End of season | |
| 24 April 1916 | FW | J. Champion | n/a | 24 April 1916 | |
| 24 April 1916 | FW | (England) William Knight | (England) Steel Barrel Works | End of season | |
| 24 April 1916 | HB | F. Stuckey | (England) Old Kingstonians | 24 April 1916 | |
| 6 May 1916 | HB | (England) Archie Mitchell | (England) Queens Park Rangers | End of season | |
| 6 May 1916 | HB | (England) Billy Wake | (England) Queens Park Rangers | End of season | |
