= 1905–06 Aston Villa F.C. season =

English football club season

Aston Villa
1905–06 season
- President: Joseph Ansell
- Chairman: Frederick Rinder
- Manager: George Ramsay
- First Division: 8th
- FA Cup: third round

Second City Derby
- 9--2--4

The 1905–06 English football season was Aston Villa's 18th season in the Football League competing in the First Division, (Note: Up until 1992, the top division of English football was the Football League First Division. The Premier League took over from the First Division as the top tier of the English football league system upon its formation in 1992. The First Division then became the second tier of English football, the Second Division became the third tier and so on. The First Division is now known as the Football League Championship, while the Second Division is now known as Football League One.) the top flight of English football at the time. The season fell in what was to be called Villa's golden era.

Aston Villa started the new year having been defeated by Blackburn Rovers meaning that they had a record of DWL in the three post-Christmas fixtures. January's bad weather meant the trip to Sunderland was postponed until the end of January Villa lost both matches in the Second City derby, 0–2 away, and 1–3 at home.

During the season Howard Spencer was captain of the club.

In February 1905, after 167 league games, Harry Hadley left West Brom to join Aston Villa for a fee of £250, but played just 11 times before joining Nottingham Forest in April 1906.

There were debut appearances for Charlie Millington, Barney Allen, Harry Hadley, George Garratt, Jock Logan, Joe Walters, Samuel Greenhalgh, John Boden, Joe Hisbent, Arthur Elston, Bert Kingaby, Rowland Codling, and Tom Riley (16).

== Football League ==
Pos	Team	Pld	W	D	L	GF	GA	GAv	Pts
6	Bolton Wanderers	38	17	7	14	81	67	1.209	41
7	Birmingham	38	17	7	14	65	59	1.102	41
8	Aston Villa	38	17	6	15	72	56	1.286	40
9	Blackburn Rovers	38	16	8	14	54	52	1.038	40
10	Stoke	38	16	7	15	54	55	0.982	39

Source: World Football
Rules for classification: 1) Points; 2) Goal average; 3) Goals scored

=== Matches ===
2 September 1905	Blackburn Rovers	1–1	Aston Villa	Ewood Park
		Report	Harry Hampton

9 September 1905	Aston Villa	2–1	Sunderland	Villa Park
	Billy Garraty (1–0, 2–1 pen)	Report

11 September 1905	Aston Villa	5–0	Liverpool	Villa Park
	Harry Hampton (5', 3–0, 5–0); Joe Bache (7'); Billy Brawn (65')	Report

16 September 1905	Birmingham	2–0	Aston Villa	Muntz Street
		Report

23 September 1905	Aston Villa	4–0	Everton	Villa Park
	Joe Bache (29'); Billy Garraty (60'); Harry Hampton (67'); Albert Hall (85')	Report

30 September 1905	Derby County	1–0	Aston Villa	Baseball Ground
		Report

7 October 1905	Aston Villa	3–0	Sheffield Wednesday	Villa Park
	Billy Brawn (4', 58'); Joe Bache (73')	Report

14 October 1905	Nottingham Forest	2–2	Aston Villa	City Ground
	Charlie Millington (4'); Billy Garraty (82' pen)	Report

21 October 1905	Aston Villa	2–1	Manchester City	Villa Park
	Joe Bache (26'); Billy Garraty (51' pen)	Report

28 October 1905	Bury	0–1	Aston Villa	Gigg Lane
		Report	Joe Bache (60')

4 November 1905	Aston Villa	4–1	Middlesbrough	Villa Park
	Harry Hampton (24'); Barney Allen (26'); Joe Bache (30'); Billy Garraty (75' pen)	Report

11 November 1905	Preston North End	2–0	Aston Villa	Deepdale
		Report

13 November 1905	Stoke	0–1	Aston Villa	Victoria Ground
		Report	Billy Garraty

18 November 1905	Aston Villa	0–3	Newcastle United	Villa Park
		Report

25 November 1905	Aston Villa	6–0	Wolverhampton Wanderers	Villa Park
	Jimmy Cantrell (14', 31', 60'); Billy Garraty (74', 80'); Harry Hampton (82')	Report

2 December 1905	Liverpool	3–0	Aston Villa	Anfield
		Report

9 December 1905	Aston Villa	4–1	Sheffield United	Villa Park
	Albert Hall (48'); Billy Garraty (53', 57'); Harry Hampton (85')	Report

16 December 1905	Notts County	2–1	Aston Villa	Trent Bridge
		Report	Harry Hampton (13')

23 December 1905	Aston Villa	3–0	Stoke	Villa Park
	Billy Garraty (1'); Harry Hampton (8', 60')	Report

26 December 1905	Aston Villa	1–1	Bolton Wanderers	Villa Park
	Joe Bache (80')	Report

27 December 1905	Aston Villa	2–1	Woolwich Arsenal	Villa Park
	Billy Garraty (1–0); Harry Hampton (2–0)	Report

30 December 1905	Aston Villa	0–1	Blackburn Rovers	Villa Park
		Report

2 January 1906	Bolton Wanderers	4–1	Aston Villa	Burnden Park
		Report	Harry Hampton (1–2)

20 January 1906	Aston Villa	1–3	Birmingham	Villa Park
	Joe Bache (47')	Report

27 January 1906	Everton	4–2	Aston Villa	Goodison Park
		Report	Billy Matthews (20'); Harry Hampton (2–4)

10 February 1906	Sheffield Wednesday	2–2	Aston Villa	Owlerton
		Report	Billy Matthews (25'); Harry Hampton (80')

17 February 1906	Aston Villa	3–1	Nottingham Forest	Villa Park
	Billy Garraty (43'); Albert Hall (44'); Joe Bache (74')	Report

28 February 1906	Sunderland	2–0	Aston Villa	Roker Park
		Report

3 March 1906	Aston Villa	3–3	Bury	Villa Park
	Harry Hampton (2', 3–1); Albert Hall (20')	Report

10 March 1906	Middlesbrough	1–2	Aston Villa	Ayresome Park
		Report	John Boden (46'); Billy Garraty (83')

14 March 1906	Manchester City	1–4	Aston Villa	Hyde Road
		Report	Harry Hampton (1–1, 4–1); Joe Bache (2–1); Billy Garraty (3–1)

17 March 1906	Aston Villa	0–1	Preston North End	Villa Park
		Report

24 March 1906	Newcastle United	3–1	Aston Villa	St James' Park
		Report	Billy Matthews (1–3)

31 March 1906	Wolverhampton Wanderers	4–1	Aston Villa	Molineux
		Report	Joe Bache (35')

13 April 1906	Woolwich Arsenal	2–1	Aston Villa	Manor Ground
		Report	Charlie Millington (65')

14 April 1906	Sheffield United	1–1	Aston Villa	Bramall Lane
		Report	Joe Bache

16 April 1906	Aston Villa	6–0	Derby County	Villa Park
	Charlie Millington (1–0); Billy Garraty (2–0); Joe Walters (3–0); Joe Bache (4–0); Billy Matthews (5–0); John Boden (6–0)	Report

21 April 1906	Aston Villa	2–1	Notts County	Villa Park
	Joe Bache (13'); Joe Walters (16')	Report

Source: avfchistory.co.uk

== Players ==
- (England) Billy Garraty, 37 appearances
- (England) Howard Spencer, 37 appearances
- (England) Billy George, 36 appearances, conceded 53
- (England) Harry Hampton, 35 appearances
- (England) Albert Hall, 34 appearances
- (England) Joe Bache, 34 appearances
- (England) Joe Pearson, 30 appearances
- (England) Alex Leake, 26 appearances
- (England) Jack Windmill, 16 appearances
- (England) Billy Brawn, 15 appearances
- (England) Albert Evans, 15 appearances
- (England) Albert Wilkes, 8 appearances
- (England) George Harris, 8 appearances
- Jimmy Cantrell, 8 appearances
- (England) Billy Matthews, 7 appearances
- (England) Freddie Miles, 7 appearances
- Harry Cooch, 6 appearances, conceded 9
- (England) Micky Noon, 5 appearances
- Watty Corbett, 4 appearances
- Walter Brown, 1 appearance

Arrivals

- George Garratt, 17 appearances
- Samuel Greenhalgh, 12 appearances
- Harry Hadley, 11 appearances
- Jock Logan, 11 appearances
- John Boden, 10 appearances
- Joey Walters, 8 appearances
- Charlie Millington, 7 appearances
- Bert Kingaby, 4 appearances
- Tom Riley, 4 appearances
- Barney Allen, 3 appearances
- Rowland Codling, 3 appearances
- Joe Hisbent, 2 appearances, served in the Worcestershire Regiment during the First World War.
- Arthur Elston, 1 appearance

Exits

- Josiah Gray
- (England) Alf Wood left in May 1905 having scored seven goals in 111 league and cup games.
- (Scotland) Willie Clarke, the first Black professional footballer to score in the English Football League.
- (England) George Johnson to Plymouth Argyle
- (Wales) Mart Watkins to Sunderland. A short career at Villa Park playing just six matches and scoring once.

== Reserves ==
The Aston Villa Reserves won the Birmingham & District League for the fourth year in succession.
