= Bob McTavish (footballer) =

Scottish footballer (1888–1972)

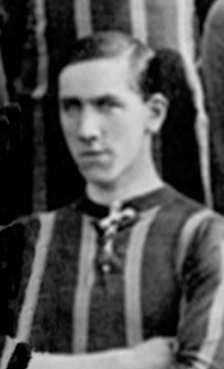
- McTavish while with Brentford 1912

Personal information
- Full name: Robert McTavish
- Date of birth: 26 October 1888
- Place of birth: Govan, Scotland
- Date of death: 1972 (aged 83–84)
- Place of death: Glasgow, Scotland
- Position: Inside left

Youth career
- –1905: Avondale

Senior career*
| Years | Team | Apps | (Gls) |
| 1905–1906 | Ibrox Roselie | | |
| 1906–1907 | Petershill | | |
| 1907–1910 | Falkirk | 17 | (7) |
| 1910–1912 | Tottenham Hotspur | 11 | (3) |
| 1912–1913 | Brentford | 38 | (7) |
| 1913–1914 | Third Lanark | 22 | (4) |
| 1914–1915 | York City | | |
| 1915–1916 | Raith Rovers | 14 | (2) |
- * Club domestic league appearances and goals

Robert McTavish (26 October 1888 – 1972) was a Scottish professional footballer who played in the Scottish League for Third Lanark, Falkirk and Raith Rovers as an inside left. He also played in England for Brentford and Tottenham Hotspur.

== Personal life ==
McTavish's brother Jock was also a footballer and a forward; they were teammates at Falkirk and Tottenham Hotspur. His son John played as a defender, principally for Manchester City.

== Career statistics ==
Appearances and goals by club, season and competition
| Club | Season | League | | | National cup | | Total | |
| Club | Season | Division | Apps | Goals | Apps | Goals | Apps | Goals |
|---|---|---|---|---|---|---|---|---|
| Falkirk | 1907–08 | Scottish Division One | 7 | 4 | 0 | 0 | 7 | 4 |
| Falkirk | 1908–09 | Scottish Division One | 8 | 3 | 0 | 0 | 8 | 3 |
| Falkirk | 1909–10 | Scottish Division One | 2 | 0 | 0 | 0 | 2 | 0 |
| Falkirk | Total | | 17 | 7 | 0 | 0 | 17 | 7 |
| Tottenham Hotspur | 1910–11 | First Division | 11 | 3 | 1 | 0 | 12 | 3 |
| Brentford | 1911–12 | Southern League First Division | 12 | 6 | — | | 12 | 6 |
| Brentford | 1912–13 | Southern League First Division | 26 | 0 | 2 | 1 | 28 | 1 |
| Brentford | Total | | 38 | 6 | 2 | 1 | 40 | 7 |
| Third Lanark | 1913–14 | Scottish Division One | 22 | 4 | 2 | 0 | 24 | 4 |
| Raith Rovers (loan) | 1915–16 | Scottish Division One | 14 | 2 | — | | 14 | 2 |
| Career total | | | 102 | 22 | 5 | 1 | 107 | 23 |

== Honours ==
Falkirk

- Stirlingshire Cup: 1909–10
- Stirlingshire Consolation Cup: 1907–08
- Dewar Shield: 1907–08
