= Purver =

Purver is a surname. Notable people with the surname include:

- Alex Purver (born 1995), English footballer
- Henry Purver (1891–1916), English footballer
