= John McTavish (footballer, born 1885) =

Scottish footballer (1885–1944)

Personal information
- Full name: John Kay McTavish
- Date of birth: 7 June 1885
- Place of birth: Govan, Scotland
- Date of death: 4 April 1944 (aged 58)
- Place of death: Falkirk, Scotland
- Position: Inside right

Senior career*
Years	Team	Apps	(Gls)
- Ibrox Roselea
1904–1905	Petershill		
1905–1910	Falkirk	151	(35)
1910	Oldham Athletic	10	(0)
1910–1912	Tottenham Hotspur	38	(3)
1912–1913	Newcastle United	34	(6)
1913–1919	Partick Thistle	123	(18)
1914	→ York City (loan)		
1915	→ Goole Town (loan)		
1917	→ Heart of Midlothian (loan)	5	(0)
1917–1918	→ Falkirk (loan)	11	(2)
1918–1919	→ York City (loan)		
1919–1920	Bo'ness		
1920–1921	East Fife		
1920–1921	→ Dumbarton (loan)	22	(3)
1921–1922	East Stirlingshire	23	(5)

International career
1907–1908	Scottish League XI	2	(0)
1912	Scotland	1	(0)
1916	Scottish League (wartime)	1	(0)
- * Club domestic league appearances and goals

John Kay McTavish (7 June 1885 – 4 April 1944) was a Scottish footballer who played for several clubs, including Falkirk, Oldham Athletic, Tottenham Hotspur, Newcastle United, Partick Thistle, Dumbarton and East Stirlingshire, and for Scotland at international level.

== Club career ==
McTavish began his career at the Glasgow junior side Petershill before joining Falkirk in 1905, being a part of the team which finished runners-up in Scottish Division One twice (the 1907–08 and 1909–10 seasons).

In summer 1910, he joined Oldham Athletic and played 10 matches at Boundary Park before signing for Tottenham Hotspur by the end of the same year. The inside right featured in 40 games and scored twice in all competitions for the Lilywhites between December 1910 and April 1912, when he left White Hart Lane to join Newcastle United where he made a further 34 appearances and scored six goals.

He went on have spells at Partick Thistle, York City, Goole Town, Heart of Midlothian, a return to Falkirk, East Fife, Dumbarton and finally East Stirlingshire.

== International career ==
McTavish played once for Scotland against Ireland on 19 March 1910. The match played in Belfast ended in a 1–0 victory for Ireland.

== Personal life ==
McTavish's younger brother Bob was also a footballer and a forward whose career path took him to Petershill then Falkirk, where the siblings were teammates – although Bob's preferred position at right wing was occupied by Jock Simpson, with whom John had a noted partnership. The brothers also played together at Tottenham.

McTavish died in 1944.
