= Chapelhow (surname) =

Chapelhow is a surname. Notable people with the surname include:

- Harry Chapelhow (1886–1957), English footballer
- James Chapelhow (born 1995), English rugby league player
