= Pip Rippon =

English footballer

Personal information
- Full name: Thomas Rippon
- Date of birth: 4 February 1888
- Place of birth: Beighton, England
- Date of death: 29 May 1950 (aged 62)
- Place of death: Sheffield, England
- Height: 5 ft 8 in (1.73 m)
- Position: Forward

Youth career
- 1911: Woolwich Arsenal

Senior career*
Years	Team	Apps	(Gls)
1911–1920	Grimsby Town	121	(37)
1920–1922	Lincoln City^{[A]}	33	(10)
–	Worksop Town		
–	York City		
–	Wath Athletic		
1926–1927	Grantham		
- * Club domestic league appearances and goals

Thomas "Pip" Rippon (4 February 1888 – 29 May 1950) was an English professional footballer who scored 47 goals from 154 appearances in the Football League playing as a forward for Grimsby Town and Lincoln City and Blackburn Rovers.

Rippon was born in Beighton, then in Derbyshire, now a part of Sheffield. He played for Grimsby Town both before and after the First World War, making 121 appearances in the Football League. In 1920, he joined Lincoln City, then playing in the Midland League. Rippon made his Lincoln debut on 28 August 1920 in a 3–1 win at home to Mexborough Town, and went on to be the club's leading scorer in the 1920–21 season with 27 goals from League and FA Cup games as Lincoln won the Midland League title. He played regularly the following season, in the newly formed Football League Third Division North, but was less prolific, though his ten goals still placed him second in Lincoln's scoring charts. Rippon played his last senior game for the club in May 1922, then returned to the Midland League with Worksop Town, York City, Wath Athletic and Grantham. Rippon died in Sheffield in 1950 at the age of 62.

== Personal life ==
Rippon's brother Willis was also a footballer and both were on the books together at Woolwich Arsenal and Grimsby Town.

== Notes ==
A.: Lincoln City appearances and goals are for Football League matches only, not those in the Midland League.
