= Willis Rippon =

English footballer

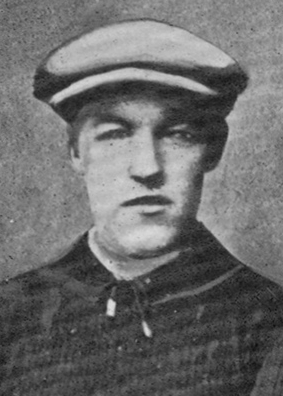
- Rippon while with Bristol City in 1910.

Personal information
- Full name: Willis Rippon
- Date of birth: 15 May 1886
- Place of birth: Beighton, England
- Date of death: 16 March 1956 (aged 69)
- Place of death: Rotherham, England
- Position: Centre forward

Senior career*
Years	Team	Apps	(Gls)
1903–1904	Hackenthorpe		
1904–1905	Rawmarsh Albion		
1905–1906	Sandhill Rovers		
1906–1907	Kilnhurst Town		
1907–1910	Bristol City	36	(14)
1910–1911	Woolwich Arsenal	9	(2)
1911–1912	Brentford	24	(17)
1912–1913	Hamilton Academical	39	(22)
1913–1914	Grimsby Town	23	(12)
1914	Rotherham County		
1914–1920	Rotherham Town		
- * Club domestic league appearances and goals

Willis Rippon (15 May 1886 – 16 March 1956) was an English professional footballer who played as a centre forward in the Football League for Bristol City, Grimsby Town and Woolwich Arsenal. He also had a notable spell in Scotland with Hamilton Academical, with whom he scored 22 goals in 39 league appearances.

== Personal life ==
Rippon's brother Pip was also a footballer and both played together at Woolwich Arsenal and Grimsby Town. He served in the British Armed Forces during the First World War.

== Career statistics ==
Appearances and goals by club, season and competition
Club	Season	League			National cup (Note: Includes FA Cup, Scottish Cup)		Other		Total	
Club	Season	Division	Apps	Goals	Apps	Goals	Apps	Goals	Apps	Goals
Bristol City	1907–08	First Division	7	2	0	0	—		7	2
Bristol City	1908–09	First Division	23	8	0	0	—		23	8
Bristol City	1909–10	First Division	6	4	0	0	—		6	4
Bristol City	Total		36	14	0	0	—		36	14
Woolwich Arsenal	1910–11	First Division	9	2	—		—		9	2
Brentford	1911–12	Southern League First Division	24	17	5	3	—		29	20
Hamilton Academical	1912–13	Scottish League First Division	29	20	4	3	4 (Note: 2 appearances in Lanarkshire Cup, 2 appearances and 2 goals in Larkhall Charity Cup)	2	37	25
Hamilton Academical	1913–14	Scottish League First Division	10	2	—		2 (Note: 2 appearances in Lanarkshire Cup)	0	12	2
Hamilton Academical	Total		39	22	4	3	6	2	49	27
Career total			109	55	9	6	6	2	124	63
