= Billy Hampson =

English footballer and manager

Personal information
- Full name: Billy Hampson
- Date of birth: 1884
- Place of birth: Radcliffe, England
- Date of death: 24 February 1966 (aged 81–82)

Senior career*
Years	Team	Apps	(Gls)
- Rochdale
- Bury
- Norwich City
1914–1927	Newcastle United		
1916–1919	Leeds City (guest)		
1927–1930	South Shields		

Managerial career
- 1930–1933: Carlisle United
- Ashington
- 1935–1947: Leeds United
- * Club domestic league appearances and goals

Billy Hampson (1884 – 24 February 1966) was an English football player and manager.

Hampson was born in Radcliffe, Lancashire and was the brother of footballers Tommy and Walker Hampson. He played for Rochdale, Bury and Norwich City before moving to Newcastle United for £1,250 in January 1914. However, before Hampson could properly settle at the club, war broke out later that year and Newcastle closed St James' Park. Hampson was determined to continue playing, and joined Leeds City as a 'guest' player during the war. He was a regular, turning out in 91 matches between December 1916 and April 1919 and helping them to win the unofficial title of League Champions in 1918.

Hampson was 35 years old when the war ended and he returned to Newcastle; his place in the first team had gone to an older player, Billy McCracken. Hampson pledged to fight for a first team place; he was returned to his former place when McCracken left in 1923 to manage Hull City. He played in the 1924 FA Cup final when Newcastle beat Aston Villa 2–0. Although incorrectly listed in some publications as the oldest player to have appeared in the final, he was aged 39 at the time.

He stayed at Newcastle for the next three years, before leaving for nearby South Shields in September 1927. He continued playing until March 1930, when he retired from play at the age of 47. Later that month, he took over as manager of lowly Carlisle United. His time at the club was largely unsuccessful as the team finished 15th and conceded 101 goals in his first campaign. However, he did unearth two footballing gems in Bill Shankly and Bob Batey, who went on to have excellent reputations. He left the club in May 1933.

He had a short stint in charge of Ashington back in the north-east before taking over from Dick Ray as manager of Leeds United in March 1935. They finished 18th at the end of his first season in charge. Hampson felt the team needed experienced players which prompted him to sign former England internationals, goalkeeper Albert McInroy and forward George Brown, in the summer. The signings did not prove to have a great effect on the club's fortunes, but they consolidated their First Division status in the few years before World War II. They avoided relegation by just two points in 1936–37. Hampson began to develop a lot of young players, leading to Leeds' only Central League win that same season. He was also known for scouting Ireland for young players. His squad generally consisted of both youth and experience but by the time football officially restarted after the war, in 1946–47, these players were well past their best. Hampson stood by his pre-war squad which proved to be the downfall.

Leeds had a dreadful season, with only one point taken away from Elland Road and just six victories all year. They finished bottom with eighteen points – fifteen points away from safety. Hampson resigned soon after the relegation and was replaced by former Leeds player Willis Edwards in April 1947. Hampton continued working at the club until October of that year as the chief scout, before coaching in schools football.

In total, Hampson held the post of Leeds United manager for 12 years. However, as that period spanned the Second World War, he was only in charge for five seasons of official football.

On 24 February 1966, Billy Hampson died of a heart attack.

== Honours ==
Newcastle United

- FA Cup: 1923–24
