= William Kirby (footballer, born 1883) =

English footballer

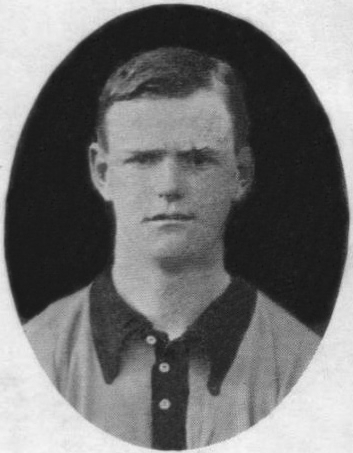
- Kirby while with Portsmouth in 1907.

Personal information
- Full name: William Kirby
- Date of birth: 21 June 1883
- Place of birth: Preston, England
- Date of death: 3 October 1917 (aged 34)
- Place of death: Polygon Wood, Passchendaele salient, Belgium
- Position: Inside left

Senior career*
Years	Team	Apps	(Gls)
1899–1900	Emmanuel Rovers		
1900–1913	Preston North End	55	(22)
1901–1902	→ Oswaldtwistle Rovers (loan)		
1902–1903	→ Swindon Town (loan)	28	(6)
1903–1904	→ West Ham United (loan)	33	(10)
1904–1905	→ Swindon Town (loan)	19	(2)
1905–1911	→ Portsmouth (loan)	224	(81)
1913	Exeter City	5	(0)
1913–1914	Merthyr Town	24	(4)
1916	Croydon Common	16	(6)
1916–1917	Brentford	18	(2)
- * Club domestic league appearances and goals

William Kirby (21 June 1883 – 3 October 1917), sometimes known as Bill Kirby or 'Sunny Jim' Kirby, was an English professional footballer, who played as an inside left and is best remembered for his time in the Southern League with Portsmouth, for whom he made over 270 appearances in all competitions. He also played in the Football League for hometown club Preston North End.

== Career ==
Born in Preston, Lancashire, Kirby started his career at Emmanuel Rovers and joined First Division club Preston North End in November 1900. He would not play competitively for Preston until 1911, but the club kept his registration and he spent much of the next decade on loan to Southern League clubs.

After a season at Oswaldtwistle Rovers, Kirby joined Southern League First Division club Swindon Town as a half-back in August 1902. The following season, he joined West Ham United and played mainly as an outside-right, but also made three appearances as a centre-forward. He scored on his debut, against Millwall, and missed just one game that season, the final game against Swindon Town.

After returning to Swindon Town for another season, he moved to Portsmouth, where he would spend the next seven seasons. He was Portsmouth's top scorer in 1906–07, when the club finished as runners-up in the Southern League First Division. By October 1910, he had scored 100 goals and received a £220 benefit from the club. West Ham United In all Kirby scored 81 goals in 224 Southern League appearances, as well as 22 goals in 36 Western League appearances and four in 12 FA Cup outings.

Kirby was re-called by Preston for the 1911–12 season, where he was top scorer and earned a Second Division championship medal.

He then had spells at Exeter City, Merthyr Town and Croydon Common, playing in their last ever match, before spending the 1916–17 season at Brentford.

== Military career and death ==
Kirby served in the Royal Engineers during the First World War, prior to being invalided out and working at the Royal Arsenal. He re-enlisted in 1917 and saw action with the 6th (Pioneer) Battalion, attached to the East Yorkshire Regiment, at the Battle of Polygon Wood (part of the Battle of Passchendaele). He was killed in action during the offensive in October of that year. He is buried at Bard Cottage Cemetery in West Flanders, Belgium.

== Honours ==
Preston North End

- Football League Second Division: 1912–13

== Career statistics ==
Appearances and goals by club, season and competition
Club	Season	League			FA Cup		Total	
Club	Season	Division	Apps	Goals	Apps	Goals	Apps	Goals
Preston North End	1911–12	First Division	38	14	1	0	39	14
Preston North End	1912–13	Second Division	17	8	0	0	17	8
Preston North End	Total		55	22	1	0	56	22
Swindon Town (loan)	1902–03	Southern League First Division	28	6	5	5	33	11
West Ham United (loan)	1903–04	Southern League First Division	33	10	3	1	36	11
Swindon Town (loan)	1904–05	Southern League First Division	19	2	2	2	21	4
Swindon Town (loan)	Swindon Town Total		47	8	7	7	54	15
Portsmouth (loan)	1904–05	Southern League First Division	11	2	—		11	2
Portsmouth (loan)	1905–06	Southern League First Division	28	6	1	1	29	7
Portsmouth (loan)	1906–07	Southern League First Division	36	21	3	1	39	22
Portsmouth (loan)	1907–08	Southern League First Division	36	11	2	0	38	11
Portsmouth (loan)	1908–09	Southern League First Division	38	11	3	2	41	13
Portsmouth (loan)	1909–10	Southern League First Division	41	21	2	0	43	21
Portsmouth (loan)	1910–11	Southern League First Division	34	9	1	0	35	9
Portsmouth (loan)	Total		224	81	12	4	236	85
Exeter City	1913–14	Southern League First Division	5	0	—		5	0
Merthyr Town	1913–14	Southern League First Division	24	4	5	2	29	6
Career Total			388	125	28	14	416	139
