= Tommy Hampson (footballer) =

English footballer (1898–c.1929)

Personal information
- Date of birth: 2 May 1898
- Place of birth: Bury, England
- Height: 5 ft 10 in (1.78 m)
- Position: Goalkeeper

Senior career*
Years	Team	Apps	(Gls)
1920–1925	West Ham United	70	(0)
1925	Blackburn Rovers	0	(0)
1925–1926	Burnley	6	(0)
1926–1927	Darlington	3	(0)
1927–1929	Cardiff City	8	(0)
1929–1930	Notts County	1	(0)
- * Club domestic league appearances and goals

Thomas Hampson (2 May 1898 – after 1929) was an English professional footballer who played as a goalkeeper.

Born in Bury, Hampson began his career at South Shields but was unable to break into the first team. In 1920 he joined West Ham United as understudy to Ted Hufton, making 70 appearances before moving to Blackburn Rovers. Following short spells at Burnley and Darlington, Hampson signed for Cardiff City but was again unable to hold down a regular place, due to the presence of Tom Farquharson, and left the side in 1929 moving into non-league football after making one appearance for Notts County.

== Personal life ==
Hampson was the brother of footballers Billy and Walker Hampson.
