= 1909–10 Northern Football League =

The 1909–10 Northern Football League season was the 21st in the history of the Northern Football League, a football competition in Northern England.

== Clubs ==
Northern League
- Season: 1909–10
- Champions: Bishop Auckland
- Matches: 132
- Goals: 518 (3.92 per match)

The league featured 11 clubs which competed in the last season, along with one new club:

- Knaresborough

=== League table ===
Pos	Team	Pld	W	D	L	GF	GA	GR	Pts	Promotion or relegation
1	Bishop Auckland	22	15	3	4	67	37	1.811	33	
2	South Bank	22	13	4	5	50	26	1.923	30	
3	Stockton	22	13	3	6	68	34	2.000	29	
4	Darlington St Augustine's	22	12	2	8	41	35	1.171	26	
5	West Auckland	22	9	4	9	35	35	1.000	22	
6	Crook Town	22	8	4	10	45	43	1.047	20	
7	Scarborough	22	8	4	10	43	49	0.878	20	Joined Yorkshire Combination
8	West Hartlepool	22	8	4	10	32	40	0.800	20	Left the league
9	Knaresborough	22	8	4	10	43	58	0.741	20	
10	Saltburn	22	7	4	11	28	46	0.609	18	
11	Grangetown Athletic	22	6	2	14	30	44	0.682	14	
12	York City	22	4	4	14	36	71	0.507	12	Joined Yorkshire Combination
