= Frederick Groves (footballer, born 1891) =

English footballer

Freddie Groves
Personal information
- Full name: Frederick William Groves
- Date of birth: 13 January 1891
- Place of birth: Shadwell, England
- Date of death: 1965 (aged 73–74)
- Positions: Outside right; inside right

Senior career*
Years	Team	Apps	(Gls)
- Barnet & Alston
1911	Glossop	9	(0)
1912–1921	Woolwich Arsenal	50	(6)
1916	→ Brentford (guest)	1	(0)
1921–1923	Brighton & Hove Albion	53	(2)
1924	Charlton Athletic	7	(0)
- Dartford
- * Club domestic league appearances and goals

Frederick William Groves (13 January 1891 – 1965) was an English professional football forward, who played in the Football League for Brighton & Hove Albion, Arsenal, Glossop and Charlton Athletic. He made over 130 appearances for Arsenal in wartime football.

== Life and career ==
Born in Shadwell, London, Groves played as a forward, either as inside forward or centre forward. He started his career at Glossop before moving to Woolwich Arsenal as an amateur in August 1912, turning professional in October 1913. He made his debut against Derby County on 7 December 1912, playing three games in Woolwich Arsenal's relegation season of 1912–13, after which they moved to Arsenal Stadium in north London and dropped the "Woolwich" from their name.

He continued to be a bit-part player in the two seasons Arsenal spent in the Football League Second Division, playing just five games in two years. After first-class football was suspended for the First World War, Groves found more chances to play in the side in wartime games, and made 133 appearances in wartime matches for Arsenal, and was a semi-regular on the resumption of League football in 1919–20, playing 29 League games that season (as Arsenal had since been elected to the First Division). He played another 13 the following season, before leaving the club in August 1921; in total he played 53 games in League and FA Cup for Arsenal, scoring seven goals.

He saw out his career, firstly at Brighton & Hove Albion for three years, and then Charlton Athletic in 1924–25.

== Career statistics ==
Appearances and goals by club, season and competition
Club	Season	League			FA Cup		Total	
Club	Season	Division	Apps	Goals	Apps	Goals	Apps	Goals
Arsenal	1912–13	First Division	3	0	0	0	3	0
Arsenal	1913–14	Second Division	3	0	1	0	4	0
Arsenal	1914–15	Second Division	2	0	0	0	2	0
Arsenal	1919–20	First Division	29	5	2	1	31	6
Arsenal	1920–21	First Division	13	1	0	0	13	1
Career total			50	6	3	1	53	7
