= Bert Powell =

English footballer

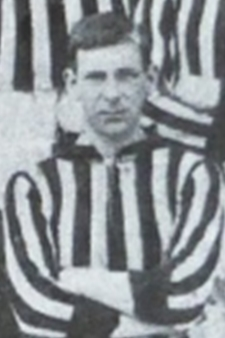
- Powell while with New Brompton in 1908.

Personal information
- Full name: Herbert Powell
- Date of birth: 23 November 1885
- Place of birth: [Netherfield, Nottingham], England
- Date of death: 28 September 1957 (aged 71)
- Place of death: [Bracebridge Heath, Lincolnshire], England
- Position: Forward

Senior career*
Years	Team	Apps	(Gls)
1902–1903	Treharris		
1903–1904	Nottingham Forest	0	(0)
1904–1905	Gresley Rovers	8	(1)
1905–1906	Grantham Avenue		
1906–1907	Chesterfield Town	6	(1)
1907	Barnsley	6	(2)
1907–1908	Carlisle United		
1908–1909	New Brompton	23	(3)
1909–1910	Coventry City	26	(13)
1910–1911	Birmingham	4	(1)
1911–1913	Rotherham Town		
1913–1914	Portsmouth		
1914–	Boscombe		
1915	→ Brentford (guest)	2	(1)
1919–1922	Worksop Town		
1922–1923	Grantham		
1923–1924	Retford Town		
- Sutton Town
- * Club domestic league appearances and goals

Herbert Powell (23 November 1885 – 28 September 1957) was an English professional footballer who played in the Football League for Chesterfield Town, Barnsley and Birmingham. He played as a forward.

== Career ==
Herbert Powell was born in Netherfield, Nottingham, Nottinghamshire. He was on the books of Nottingham Forest, though never played for the league side, and played for Gresley Rovers and Grantham Avenue before making his first appearance in the Football League, for Chesterfield Town in the Second Division in the 1906–07 season. A few months later he appeared for Barnsley, also in the Second Division, then spent time at Carlisle United, New Brompton and Coventry City, surfacing for a third time in the Second Division with Birmingham in 1910. He scored on his Birmingham debut, but soon left for a tour of senior non-league football either side of the First World War, finishing off his career with Sutton Town in 1923.
