= Sam Greenhalgh =

English footballer

Personal information
- Full name: Samuel Greenhalgh
- Date of birth: July 1882
- Place of birth: Eagley, Lancashire, England
- Date of death: 1955 (aged 72–73)
- Position: Centre half

Youth career
- Eagley
- Turton

Senior career*
Years	Team	Apps	(Gls)
1902–1905	Bolton Wanderers	96	(6)
1905–1907	Aston Villa	46	(2)
1907–1913	Bolton Wanderers	163	(13)
1913–19??	Chorley		
- * Club domestic league appearances and goals

Samuel Greenhalgh (July 1882 – 1955) was an English footballer who played as a centre half in the Football League with Bolton Wanderers and Aston Villa in the early 20th century.

He was a member of the Bolton Wanderers team which finished as runners-up in the 1904 FA Cup Final.
