= Tom Riley (footballer) =

English footballer

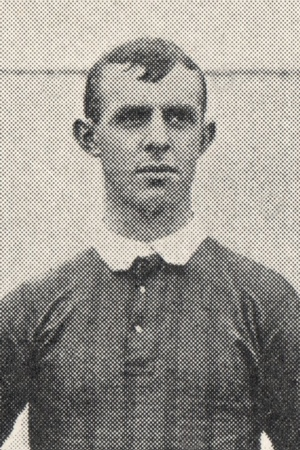
- Riley while with Brentford in 1905.

Personal information
- Full name: Thomas Riley
- Date of birth: 27 November 1881
- Place of birth: Blackburn, England
- Date of death: November 1942 (aged 60–61)
- Place of death: Blackpool, England
- Position: Full back

Youth career
- Chorley St. Mary's

Senior career*
Years	Team	Apps	(Gls)
1901–1902	Chorley		
1902–1904	Blackburn Rovers	22	(0)
1905–1906	Brentford	29	(0)
1906–1908	Aston Villa	16	(0)
1908–1909	Brentford	0	(0)
- Southampton
- * Club domestic league appearances and goals

Thomas Riley (27 November 1881 – November 1942) was an English professional footballer who played as a full back in the Football League for Blackburn Rovers and Aston Villa.

== Career statistics ==
Appearances and goals by club, season and competition
Club	Season	League			FA Cup		Total	
Club	Season	Division	Apps	Goals	Apps	Goals	Apps	Goals
Blackburn Rovers	1902–03	First Division	5	0	0	0	5	0
Blackburn Rovers	1903–04	First Division	16	0	0	0	16	0
Blackburn Rovers	1904–05	First Division	1	0	0	0	1	0
Blackburn Rovers	Total		22	0	0	0	22	0
Brentford	1905–06	Southern League First Division	29	0	4	0	33	0
Aston Villa	1905–06	First Division	4	0	—		4	0
Aston Villa	1906–07	First Division	5	0	0	0	5	0
Aston Villa	1907–08	First Division	7	0	0	0	7	0
Aston Villa	Total		16	0	0	0	16	0
Career total			67	0	4	0	71	0
