= George Garratt =

English footballer

Personal information
- Full name: George Garratt
- Date of birth: 1882
- Place of birth: Byker, England
- Position: Winger

Senior career*
Years	Team	Apps	(Gls)
1899–1902	Cradley Heath St Luke's		
1902–1904	Brierley Hill Alliance		
1904–1905	Crewe Alexandra		
1905–1906	Aston Villa	13	(0)
1906–1907	Plymouth Argyle	30	(3)
1907–1908	West Bromwich Albion	29	(3)
1908–1913	Crystal Palace	185	(8)
1913	Millwall Athletic		
1920	Kidderminster Harriers		
Total		257	(14)
- * Club domestic league appearances and goals

George Garratt (1882–unknown) was an English footballer who played in the Football League for Aston Villa and West Bromwich Albion and in the Southern League for Crystal Palace, Millwall Athletic and Plymouth Argyle.
