= James Dillimore =

English footballer

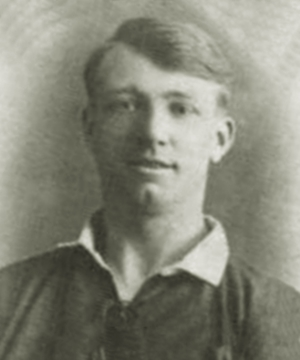
- Dillimore with Millwall in 1923.

Personal information
- Full name: James William Nowell Dillimore
- Date of birth: 19 December 1894
- Place of birth: Canning Town, England
- Date of death: 1980 (aged 85–86)
- Place of death: Waltham Forest, England
- Positions: Inside left; centre forward

Senior career*
| Years | Team | Apps | (Gls) |
| –1922 | Barking Town | | |
| 1917 | → Brentford (guest) | 13 | (5) |
| 1922–1926 | Millwall | 98 | (41) |
| 1927–1928 | Weymouth | | |
- * Club domestic league appearances and goals

James William Nowell Dillimore (19 December 1894 – 1980) was an English professional footballer who played as an inside forward in the Football League for Millwall.

== Personal life ==
In his later years, Dillimore worked as a street musician.

== Career statistics ==
Appearances and goals by club, season and competition
| Club | Season | League | | | FA Cup | | Total | |
| Club | Season | Division | Apps | Goals | Apps | Goals | Apps | Goals |
|---|---|---|---|---|---|---|---|---|
| Millwall | 1922–23 | Third Division South | 16 | 4 | 3 | 0 | 19 | 4 |
| Millwall | 1923–24 | Third Division South | 34 | 16 | 1 | 0 | 35 | 16 |
| Millwall | 1924–25 | Third Division South | 29 | 11 | 1 | 0 | 30 | 11 |
| Millwall | 1925–26 | Third Division South | 19 | 10 | 1 | 0 | 20 | 10 |
| Career total | | | 98 | 41 | 6 | 0 | 104 | 41 |
