= George Bowler =

English footballer

Personal information
- Full name: George Henry Bowler
- Date of birth: 23 January 1890
- Place of birth: Newhall, England
- Date of death: October 1948 (aged 58)
- Place of death: Bethnal Green, England
- Height: 5 ft 10 in (1.78 m)
- Position: Right half

Senior career*
| Years | Team | Apps | (Gls) |
| –1909 | Tottenham Tuesday | | |
- Newhall Swifts
| –1911 | Gresley Rovers | | |
| 1911–1913 | Derby County | 1 | (0) |
| 1913–1919 | Tottenham Hotspur | 2 | (0) |
| 1915 | → Brentford (guest) | 3 | (0) |
| 1919 | Luton Town | 2 | (0) |
- * Club domestic league appearances and goals

George Henry Bowler (23 January 1890 – October 1948) was an English professional footballer who played in the Football League for Tottenham Hotspur and Derby County as a right half.

== Career ==
A right half, Bowler began his career at local club Gresley Rovers, before moving to First Division club Derby County in May 1911. He made one appearance before moving to Tottenham Hotspur, for whom he made three appearances during the 1913–14 season and would remain with the club during the First World War. He guested for Brentford in December 1915. Bowler moved to Southern League First Division club Luton Town in 1919, but retired after failing to force his way into the first team squad.

== Personal life ==
On 15 December 1914, four months after Britain's entry into the First World War, Bowler enlisted as a private in the 1st Football Battalion of the Middlesex Regiment. The battalion was deployed to the Western Front in November 1915, where Bowler fought on the Somme, at Arras, and at Cambrai. Bowler remained in the battalion until its disbandment in February 1918, when he was transferred to the 2nd Football Battalion. In June 1918, Bowler was transferred to the 18th London Regiment, where he would remain until after the end of the war and his demobilisation in 1919.

== Career statistics ==
Appearances and goals by club, season and competition
| Club | Season | League | | | FA Cup | | Total | |
| Club | Season | Division | Apps | Goals | Apps | Goals | Apps | Goals |
|---|---|---|---|---|---|---|---|---|
| Derby County | 1912–13 | First Division | 1 | 0 | 0 | 0 | 1 | 0 |
| Tottenham Hotspur | 1913–14 | First Division | 3 | 0 | 0 | 0 | 3 | 0 |
| Luton Town | 1919–20 | Southern League First Division | 2 | 0 | ― | | 2 | 0 |
| Career Total | | | 6 | 0 | 0 | 0 | 6 | 0 |
