= Bill Blackmore =

English footballer

Personal information
- Full name: William Blackmore
- Date of birth: 17 May 1891
- Place of birth: Southampton, England
- Date of death: 1966
- Place of death: Southampton, England
- Position: Outside right

Youth career
- Adelaide, Southampton

Senior career*
Years	Team	Apps	(Gls)
1912–1913	Southampton	7	(0)
1913–1915	Woolston		
1915–1920	Southampton	0	(0)
1920–19??	Harland & Wolff		
- * Club domestic league appearances and goals

William Blackmore was an English footballer who played for Southampton in the Southern League and FA Cup in 1912–13.

== Career ==
Blackmore was born in Southampton and played junior football with the Adelaide club before joining Southampton in the 1912 close season.

He started his career in the reserve team but soon impressed new manager Jimmy McIntyre who selected him for the third match of the 1912–13 season on 12 September 1912. Blackmore replaced Sid Kimpton at outside-right, while Kimpton moved to centre-forward to replace the amateur player, Leonard Dawe. The match at Northampton Town was won 2–1 and Blackmore retained his place for the next match before Joe Blake replaced him.

Blackmore returned to the side on Christmas Day and played seven further matches (including two in the First Round of the FA Cup against Bury). Of Blackmore's nine first-team appearances in a side that struggled to produce any consistency, five matches ended in defeats, including his final match, against local rivals Portsmouth on 25 January 1913.

In September 1913, Blackmore left the club and reverted to local football with Woolston but returned following the start of World War I. He remained with the "Saints" throughout the war, making 44 appearances in the wartime competitions, scoring seven goals. He also played for Arsenal and Brentford as a guest. Blackmore spent the 1919–20 season assisting the reserve team, before retiring in the 1920 close season, after which he found employment with the Harland & Wolff shipyard, turning out for the works team.

== Career statistics ==
Appearances and goals by club, season and competition
Club	Season	League			FA Cup		Total	
Club	Season	Division	Apps	Goals	Apps	Goals	Apps	Goals
Southampton	1912–13	Southern League First Division	7	0	2	0	9	0
Career total			7	0	2	0	9	0
