= Ernie Dilley =

English footballer

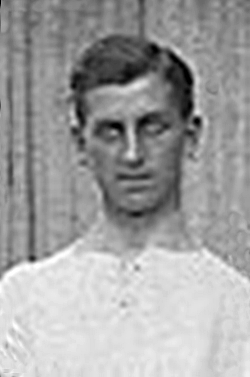
- Dilley while with Reading in 1920

Personal information
- Full name: Ernest Edward Dilley
- Date of birth: 5 June 1896
- Place of birth: Dorking, England
- Date of death: 4 January 1968 (aged 71)
- Place of death: Bromley, England
- Position: Centre forward

Senior career*
Years	Team	Apps	(Gls)
–1918	Millwall	0	(0)
1917	→ Brentford (guest)	2	(0)
1918–1920	Queens Park Rangers	0	(0)
1919	→ West Ham United (guest)	4	(1)
1920	Reading	2	(0)
- * Club domestic league appearances and goals

Ernest Edward Dilley (5 June 1896 – 4 January 1968) was an English professional footballer who played as a centre forward in the Football League for Reading.
