= Charlie Freeman =

English footballer (1887–1956)

Personal information
- Full name: Charles Redfearn Freeman
- Date of birth: 22 August 1887
- Place of birth: Overseal, Derbyshire, England
- Date of death: 17 March 1956 (aged 68)
- Place of death: Fulham, London, England
- Position: Inside forward

Senior career*
Years	Team	Apps	(Gls)
–1906	Overseal Swifts		
1906–1907	Burton United	31	(3)
1907	Overseal Swifts		
1907–1908	Fulham	0	(0)
1908–1921	Chelsea	95	(21)
1921–1923	Gillingham	82	(21)
- Maidstone United
- * Club domestic league appearances and goals

Charlie Freeman
Cricket information
- Batting: Right-handed

Domestic team information
- Years: Team
- 1911: Derbyshire
- Only FC: 1 July 1911 Derbyshire v Northamptonshire

Career statistics
Competition	First-class
Matches	1
Runs scored	7
Batting average	3.50
100s/50s	0/0
Top score	4
Catches/stumpings	1/–
- Source: CricInfo

Charles Redfearn Freeman (22 August 1887 – 17 March 1956) was an English professional footballer who played in the Football League for Chelsea, Gillingham and Burton United as an inside forward. After his retirement, he served Chelsea as trainer and groundsman. Freeman was also a cricketer and played one first-class cricket match for Derbyshire in July 1911.

== Personal life ==
Freeman served as a corporal in the Royal Air Force during the First World War and worked at the Royal Aircraft Factory.

== Career statistics ==
Appearances and goals by club, season and competition
Club	Season	League			FA Cup		Total	
Club	Season	Division	Apps	Goals	Apps	Goals	Apps	Goals
Burton United	1906–07	Second Division	31	3	3	0	34	3
Chelsea	1908–09	First Division	5	0	0	0	5	0
Chelsea	1909–10	First Division	9	2	0	0	9	2
Chelsea	1910–11	Second Division	18	2	5	1	23	3
Chelsea	1911–12	Second Division	15	7	0	0	15	7
Chelsea	1912–13	First Division	11	3	0	0	11	3
Chelsea	1913–14	First Division	21	5	1	0	22	5
Chelsea	1914–15	First Division	15	2	1	0	16	2
Chelsea	1919–20	First Division	2	0	1	0	3	0
Chelsea	Total		96	21	8	1	104	22
Gillingham	1921–22	Third Division South	40	11	4	3	44	14
Gillingham	1922–23	Third Division South	42	10	2		44	10
Gillingham	Total		82	21	6	3	88	24
Career total			208	45	19	4	227	49

== Honours ==
Chelsea

- Football League Second Division second-place promotion: 1911–12
