= Dick Wynn =

English footballer

Personal information
- Full name: Richard Cross Wynn
- Date of birth: 1892
- Place of birth: Walton, England
- Date of death: 9 August 1919 (aged 26–27)
- Place of death: Étaples, France
- Position: Outside left

Senior career*
Years	Team	Apps	(Gls)
1910–1911	Sterling		
1911–1913	Everton		
1912–1913	→ Chester (loan)		
1914–1915	Middlesbrough	7	(1)
1915–1918	→ Brentford (guest)	22	(8)
- * Club domestic league appearances and goals

Richard Cross Wynn (1892 – 9 August 1919) was an English professional footballer who appeared in the Football League for Middlesbrough as an outside left. He guested for Brentford during the First World War.

== Personal life ==
Wynn served as a sergeant in the Yorkshire Regiment during the First World War and together with his brother Robert, he arrived on the Western Front in June 1916. In February 1919, three months after the armistice, he was transferred to the Labour Corps. Wynn died in August 1919, following an operation on injuries received in an accident. He was buried in Étaples Military Cemetery.

== Career statistics ==
Appearances and goals by club, season and competition
Club	Season	League			FA Cup		Total	
Club	Season	Division	Apps	Goals	Apps	Goals	Apps	Goals
Middlesbrough	1913–14	First Division	2	1	0	0	2	1
Middlesbrough	1914–15	First Division	5	0	0	0	5	0
Career total			7	1	0	0	7	1
