= Rowland Codling =

English footballer

Personal information
- Full name: Rowland Codling
- Date of birth: 22 February 1880
- Place of birth: Norton-on-Tees, England
- Date of death: 1956 (aged 75–76)
- Position: Wing half

Senior career*
Years	Team	Apps	(Gls)
1899–1900	West Hartlepool		
1900–1901	Stockton St John's		
1901–1902	Swindon Town	12	(0)
1902–1903	Sunderland	0	(0)
1903–1904	Stockport County	28	(0)
1905–1906	Clapton Orient	28	(1)
1906–1909	Aston Villa	77	(0)
1909	Northampton Town		
1909–1910	Croydon Common		
1910–1911	Manchester City	5	(0)
1911–1914	Denton		
1914	Merthyr Town		
Total		150	(1)
- * Club domestic league appearances and goals

Rowland Codling (22 February 1880–1954) was an English footballer who played in the Football League for Aston Villa, Clapton Orient, Manchester City and Stockport County.
