= Thomas Graham (footballer, born 1887) =

English footballer

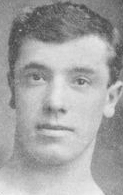
- Graham in 1911.

Personal information
- Full name: Thomas Henry Graham
- Date of birth: 20 July 1887
- Place of birth: South Shields, England
- Date of death: 1967 (aged 79–80)
- Place of death: Kensington, England
- Position: Centre forward

Senior career*
Years	Team	Apps	(Gls)
1909–1910	Barnsley	1	(0)
1910–1911	Castleford Town		
1911–1913	Brentford	17	(4)
1913	Allerton Bywater Colliery		
1913–1914	Brentford	0	(0)
1914	Castleford Town		
1917	→ Brentford (guest)	4	(0)
- * Club domestic league appearances and goals

Thomas Henry Graham (20 July 1887 – 1967) was an English professional footballer who made one appearance in the Football League for Barnsley as a centre forward. He later played in the Midland League and Southern League for Castleford Town and Brentford respectively.

== Career statistics ==
Appearances and goals by club, season and competition
Club	Season	League			FA Cup		Total	
Club	Season	Division	Apps	Goals	Apps	Goals	Apps	Goals
Brentford	1911–12	Southern League First Division	15	4	1	0	16	4
Brentford	1912–13	Southern League First Division	2	0	0	0	2	0
Career total			17	4	1	0	18	4
