= Jimmy Morris (English footballer) =

English footballer

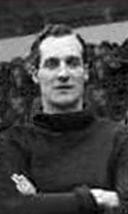
- Morris with Clapton Orient in 1914.

Personal information
- Full name: James Morris
- Place of birth: London, England
- Position: Goalkeeper

Senior career*
Years	Team	Apps	(Gls)
1913	Bury	0	(0)
1914–1918	Clapton Orient	4	(0)
1917–1918	→ Brentford (guest)	21	(0)
- * Club domestic league appearances and goals

James Morris was an English professional footballer who played as a goalkeeper in the Football League for Clapton Orient.

== Personal life ==
Morris served in the British Armed Forces during the First World War.

== Career statistics ==
Appearances and goals by club, season and competition
Club	Season	League			FA Cup		Total	
Club	Season	Division	Apps	Goals	Apps	Goals	Apps	Goals
Clapton Orient	1914–15	Second Division	4	0	0	0	4	0
Career total			4	0	0	0	4	0
