= George Malcolm (footballer) =

English footballer

Personal information
- Full name: George Malcolm
- Date of birth: 20 June 1889
- Place of birth: Thornaby-on-Tees, England
- Date of death: 1965 (aged 75–76)
- Height: 5 ft 9 1/2 in (1.77 m)
- Position: Left half

Senior career*
Years	Team	Apps	(Gls)
1905–1906	Thornaby St Mark's		
1906–1907	Thornaby St Patrick's		
1907–1910	Darlington St Augustine's		
1910	Fulham	4	(1)
1910–1912	Plymouth Argyle	40	(11)
1912–1915	Middlesbrough	94	(1)
1915–1926	Darlington	166	(7)
1926–1927	Durham City	32	(0)
- Scarborough Penguins
- * Club domestic league appearances and goals

George Malcolm (20 June 1889 – 1965) was an English professional footballer who played as a left half in the Football League for Fulham, Middlesbrough, Darlington, Durham City and in the Southern League for Plymouth Argyle.

== Personal life ==
In 1934, Malcolm was employed at ICI's Billingham Manufacturing Plant, when an escape of ammonia gas resulted in the deaths of 11 workers. In his testimony at the inquest of one victim, Malcolm described how he had to jump for his life, while the deceased was working higher up the structure and could not do so.

== Career statistics ==
Appearances and goals by club, season and competition
Club	Season	League			FA Cup		Total	
Club	Season	Division	Apps	Goals	Apps	Goals	Apps	Goals
Plymouth Argyle	1910–11	Southern League First Division	5	2	0	0	5	2
Plymouth Argyle	1911–12	Southern League First Division	26	9	0	0	26	9
Plymouth Argyle	1912–13	Southern League First Division	9	0	—		9	0
Plymouth Argyle	Total		40	11	0	0	40	11
Middlesbrough	1912–13	First Division	25	0	4	0	29	0
Middlesbrough	1913–14	First Division	35	1	1	0	36	1
Middlesbrough	1914–15	First Division	34	0	2	0	36	0
Middlesbrough	Total		94	1	7	0	101	1
Darlington	1919–20	North-Eastern League	(Note: Source lists North-Eastern League results and scorers but not lineups.)	1	5	0	5	1
Darlington	1920–21	North-Eastern League		2	3	0	3	2
Darlington	1921–22	Third Division North	37	3	4	0	41	3
Darlington	1922–23	Third Division North	37	1	2	0	39	1
Darlington	1923–24	Third Division North	41	2	4	0	45	2
Darlington	1924–25	Third Division North	42	1	5	0	47	1
Darlington	1925–26	Second Division	9	0	0	0	9	0
Darlington	Total		166	10	23	0	189	10
Durham City	1926–27	Third Division North	33	0	—		33	0
Career total			333	22	30	0	363	22
