= Walker Hampson =

English footballer

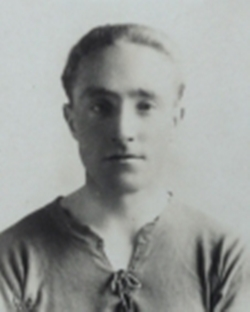
- Hampson while with Charlton Athletic in 1921.

Personal information
- Full name: Walker Hampson
- Date of birth: 24 July 1889
- Place of birth: Radcliffe, England
- Date of death: 28 June 1959 (aged 69)
- Place of death: Radcliffe, England
- Height: 5 ft 10 1/2 in (1.79 m)
- Position: Wing half

Senior career*
Years	Team	Apps	(Gls)
1912–1913	Black Lane St Andrew's		
1913–1914	Colne		
1914–1915	Burnley	4	(0)
–1919	Scotswood		
1919–1921	South Shields	50	(2)
1921–1922	Charlton Athletic	15	(0)
1922–1923	Hartlepools United	22	(4)
1923–1924	Chesterfield	12	(0)
1924	Rochdale	0	(0)
1924	Grimsby Town	0	(0)
- * Club domestic league appearances and goals

Walker Hampson (24 July 1889 – 28 June 1959) was an English professional footballer who played as a wing half in the Football League for South Shields, Hartlepools United, Charlton Athletic, Chesterfield and Burnley.

== Personal life ==
Hampson was the brother of footballers Billy and Tommy Hampson. He served as a gunner in the Royal Garrison Artillery during the First World War. In January 1917, Hampson was admitted to No. 11 Casualty Clearing Station at Varennes with synovitis of the right knee. He was discharged from the Army in September 1917.

== Career statistics ==
Appearances and goals by club, season and competition
Club	Season	League			FA Cup		Total	
Club	Season	Division	Apps	Goals	Apps	Goals	Apps	Goals
Burnley	1914–15	First Division	4	0	0	0	4	0
South Shields	1919–20	Second Division	29	0	0	0	29	0
South Shields	1920–21	Second Division	21	2	2	0	23	2
South Shields	Total		50	2	2	0	52	2
Charlton Athletic	1921–22	Third Division South	15	0	0	0	15	0
Hartlepools United	1922–23	Third Division North	22	4	0	0	22	4
Chesterfield	1923–24	Third Division North	12	0	0	0	12	0
Career total			103	6	2	0	105	6
