= Alf Spencer =

English footballer

Personal information
- Full name: Alfred Spencer
- Position: Inside right

Senior career*
Years	Team	Apps	(Gls)
1913–1914	Clapton Orient	1	(0)
1914–1915	Chatham Town		
- * Club domestic league appearances and goals

Alfred Spencer was an English amateur footballer who made one appearance in the Football League for Clapton Orient as an inside right.

== Personal life ==
Spencer served as a private in the British Army in India and during the First World War. He was wounded twice during the war and was listed as a prisoner of war in May 1918.
