= Bill Hooper (footballer, born 1884) =

English footballer

Personal information
- Full name: William George Hooper
- Date of birth: 20 February 1884
- Place of birth: Lewisham, England
- Date of death: 3 September 1952 (aged 68)
- Place of death: Southport, England
- Position: Outside right

Senior career*
Years	Team	Apps	(Gls)
- Catford Southend
–1905	Royal Army Service Corps		
1905–1906	Grimsby Town	33	(5)
1906–1912	Nottingham Forest	147	(22)
1912	Notts County	16	(1)
–1914	Barrow		
1914–1915	Gillingham	25	(1)
1915–1920	Southport Vulcan	28	(5)
1915–1918	→ Brentford (guest)	37	(7)
- Lancaster Town
- * Club domestic league appearances and goals

William George Hooper (20 February 1884 – 3 September 1952) was an English professional footballer who made over 190 appearances as an outside right in the Football League, most notably for Nottingham Forest.

== Personal life ==
Hooper served in the Army Service Corps until 1905.

== Career statistics ==
Appearances and goals by club, season and competition
Club	Season	League			FA Cup		Other		Total	
Club	Season	Division	Apps	Goals	Apps	Goals	Apps	Goals	Apps	Goals
Nottingham Forest	1906–07	Second Division	13	2	0	0	—		13	2
Nottingham Forest	1907–08	First Division	20	0	0	0	—		20	0
Nottingham Forest	1908–09	First Division	37	8	4	2	—		41	10
Nottingham Forest	1909–10	First Division	29	4	4	0	—		33	4
Nottingham Forest	1910–11	First Division	37	6	1	0	—		38	6
Nottingham Forest	1911–12	Second Division	11	2	0	0	—		11	2
Nottingham Forest	Total		147	22	9	2	—		156	24
Notts County	1912–13	First Division	16	1	0	0	—		16	1
Gillingham	1914–15	Southern League First Division	25	1	0	0	—		25	1
Southport Vulcan	1919–20	Central League	28	5	1	0	5 (Note: Appearances in Lancashire Junior Cup)	4	34	9
Career total			216	29	10	2	5	4	231	35

== Honours ==
Nottingham Forest

- Football League Second Division: 1906–07

Southport Vulcan

- Lancashire Junior Cup: 1919–20
