= Harry Chapelhow =

English footballer

Personal information
- Full name: Henry Chapelhow
- Date of birth: 6 March 1885
- Place of birth: Penrith, England
- Date of death: 1960 (aged 74–75)
- Place of death: Darlington, England
- Position: Outside right

Senior career*
Years	Team	Apps	(Gls)
1906–1908	Penrith		
1908–1909	Lancaster		
1909	Chorley		
1909–1910	Manchester City	7	(0)
1910–1911	Darlington		
1911–1912	Middlesbrough	0	(0)
1912–1913	Carlisle United		
1913–1914	Houghton Rovers		
1914–1915	Penrith		
- * Club domestic league appearances and goals

Henry Chapelhow (6 March 1885 – 1960), sometimes known as Bert Chapelow, was an English professional footballer who played as an outside right in the Football League for Manchester City.

== Personal life ==
In November 1915, during the First World War, Chapelhow enlisted in the Royal Garrison Artillery. He was gassed and admitted to the Croydon War Hospital in April 1918. After his discharge one month later, he was posted to the Royal Artillery Command Depot in Ripon until the Armistice.

== Career statistics ==
Appearances and goals by club, season and competition
Club	Season	League			FA Cup		Total	
Club	Season	Division	Apps	Goals	Apps	Goals	Apps	Goals
Manchester City	1909–10	Second Division	7	0	0	0	7	0
Career total			7	0	0	0	7	0
