= York City F.C. (1908) =

Defunct association football club in York, England

- Full name: York City Football Club
- Founded: 1908
- Dissolved: 1917
- Ground: Field View
- 1914–15: Midland League, 16th of 20

York City Football Club was an association football club based in the city of York, Yorkshire, England. Founded in 1908, the club completed seven seasons before folding in 1917.

== History ==
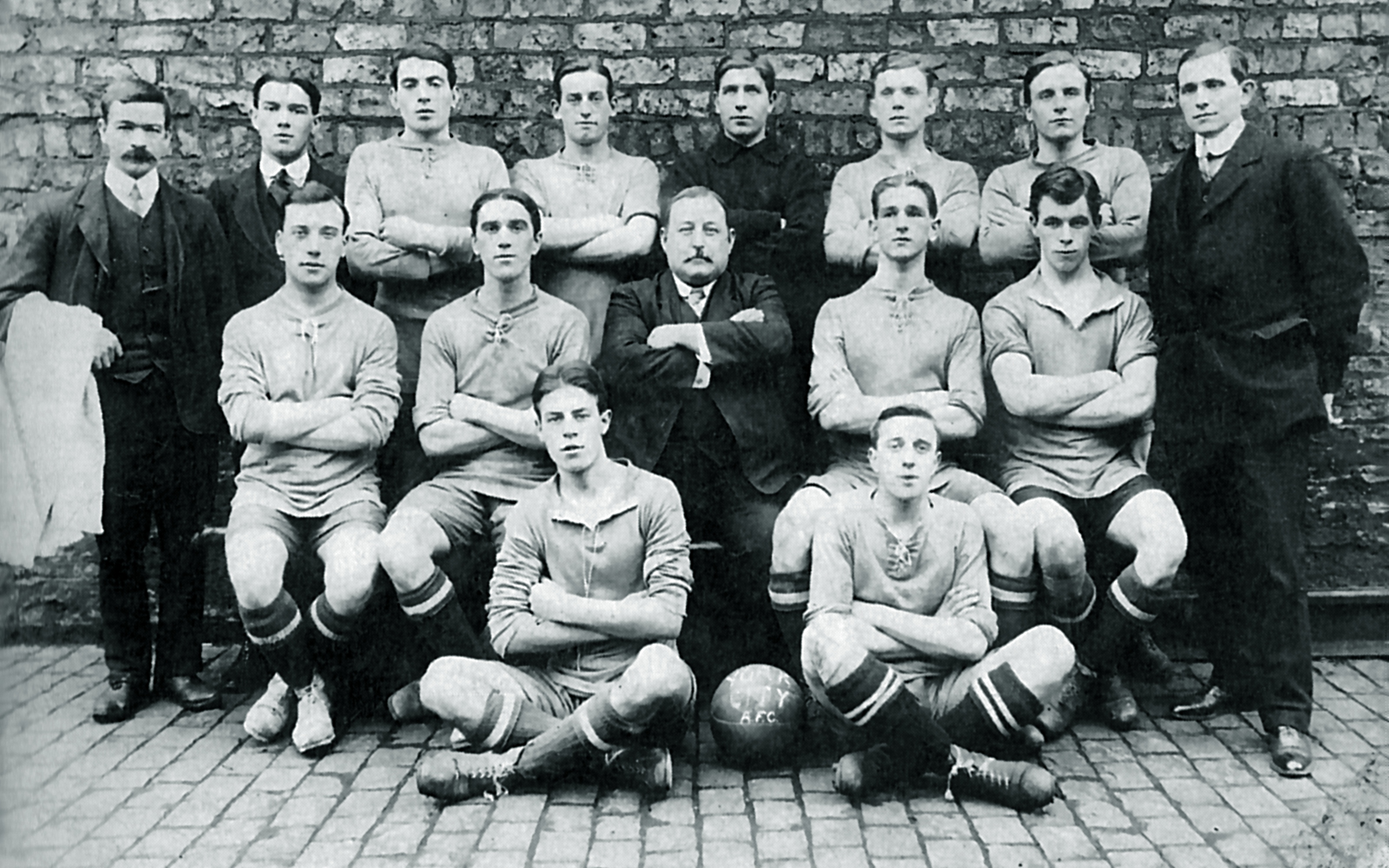
Line-up of York City personnel, pre-1912

With the expansion of the York & District League (formed 1897) at a time when association football was gaining in national popularity, demand for a club representative of the city of York arose. York City Football Club was founded as an amateur club, joining the Northern League for the 1908–09 season and acquiring a ground on Holgate Road at the end of Lindley Street and Murray Street. York won their first match 2–1 at home to South Bank, and finished the season 11th out of 12 teams in the Northern League. During this season, the club entered the FA Amateur Cup. After beating Withernsea and York St Paul's, York were knocked out in the third qualifying round by Scarborough in a replay. York finished in last place in the Northern League in the 1909–10 season, before joining the Yorkshire Combination as founder members to reduce travelling. York competed in this division for two seasons; after finishing eighth in a 10-team league in the 1910–11 season, they ranked in the same position in an expanded league of 14 teams in 1911–12.

J. E. Wright took over as secretary in 1911, and advocated the formation of a limited company to run a professional club, believing amateur football would not succeed in a rugby league stronghold. The club turned professional in 1912, and acquired a rough plot of land on Burton Stone Lane, where a new ground, known as Field View, was built. York were admitted to the Midland League for the 1912–13 season, and the new ground was opened on 7 September with a 2–1 win over Rotherham Town, which was played before a crowd of around 5,000. They played in the Midland League for three seasons, achieving a highest finish of 10th of 20 teams in the 1912–13 season, before ranking 12th in an 18-team league in 1913–14. However, the club struggled to establish itself, and was hindered by frequent fixture clashes with York F.C., the local rugby league club.

York were invited to a meeting to discuss the formation of a Third Division of the Football League, but with the outbreak of the First World War the meeting did not take place. Because of hostilities, the Midland League was suspended after the 1914–15 season, in which York ranked 16th out of 20 teams. The club went into liquidation through the bankruptcy court in August 1917 after a creditor pressed for payment of the ground's stand. York's ground was taken over by the City of York Corporation, which leased it to allotment holders, before a housing estate was built on the site. With football becoming increasingly popular locally after the end of the war, there came demand for a new club for the city of York. A new club, also called York City Football Club, was formed in 1922.
