= Henry Cook (footballer) =

English footballer

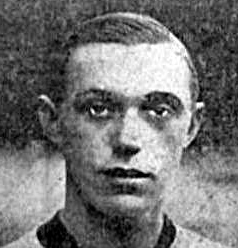
- Cook while with Middlesbrough in 1912.

Personal information
- Full name: Henry Cook
- Date of birth: 23 October 1893
- Place of birth: Middlesbrough, England
- Date of death: 9 January 1917 (aged 23)
- Place of death: Maurepas, France
- Position: Wing half

Senior career*
Years	Team	Apps	(Gls)
- South Bank
1912–1916	Middlesbrough	23	(0)
1915–1916	→ Brentford (guest)	10	(0)
- * Club domestic league appearances and goals

Henry Cook (23 October 1893 – 9 January 1917) was an English professional footballer who played as a wing half in the Football League for Middlesbrough. He also played for South Bank and appeared as a guest for Brentford during the First World War.

== Personal life ==
Prior to becoming a professional footballer, Cook was a teacher at Marton Road School and North Ormesby Junior Boys' School in Middlesbrough. After enlisting in January 1915, Cook served as a sergeant in the 12th (Service) Battalion of the Yorkshire Regiment during the First World War. He took part in the operations on the Ancre and was wounded in action by shellfire in early January 1917 while the battalion was engaged in road works in the vicinity of Maurepas, Somme. He died of his wounds on 9 January 1917 and was buried in Grove Town Cemetery, Méaulte. At the time of his death, Cook had been accepted for a commission and would have returned to England three days later to begin officer training. He left a wife and two children.

== Career statistics ==
Appearances and goals by club, season and competition
Club	Season	League			FA Cup		Total	
Club	Season	Division	Apps	Goals	Apps	Goals	Apps	Goals
Middlesbrough	1912–13	First Division	5	0	0	0	5	0
Middlesbrough	1913–14	First Division	10	0	0	0	10	0
Middlesbrough	1914–15	First Division	8	0	2	0	10	0
Career total			23	0	2	0	25	0
