= Billy Clarkson =

English footballer (1891–1954)

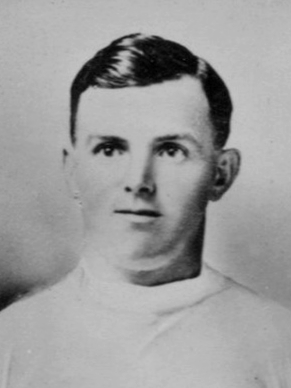
- Clarkson while with Luton Town in 1922.

Personal information
- Full name: William Clarkson
- Date of birth: 22 September 1891
- Place of birth: Wombwell, England
- Date of death: 11 December 1954 (aged 63)
- Place of death: Burnley, England
- Height: 5 ft 7 1/2 in (1.71 m)
- Position: Outside forward

Senior career*
Years	Team	Apps	(Gls)
1912–1913	Padiham		
1913–	Nelson		
–1920	Burnley	2	(0)
1915–1917	→ Brentford (guest)	23	(3)
1915–1916	→ Southport Central (guest)		
1920–1922	Rotherham County	63	(2)
1922–1923	Luton Town	32	(3)
1923–1924	Southport	19	(1)
- Scunthorpe & Lindsey United
- * Club domestic league appearances and goals

William Clarkson (22 September 1891 – 11 December 1954) was an English professional footballer who played as an outside forward in the Football League for Rotherham County, Luton Town, Southport and Burnley.

== Personal life ==
After retiring from football, Clarkson worked as a commission agent.

== Career statistics ==
Appearances and goals by club, season and competition
Club	Season	League			FA Cup		Total	
Club	Season	Division	Apps	Goals	Apps	Goals	Apps	Goals
Burnley	1919–20	First Division	2	0	0	0	2	0
Luton Town	1922–23	Third Division South	32	3	1	0	33	3
Southport	1923–24	Third Division North	19	1	0	0	19	1
Career total			53	4	1	0	54	4
