= Henry Purver =

English footballer

Personal information
- Full name: Henry George Purver
- Date of birth: 3 May 1891
- Place of birth: Isleworth, England
- Date of death: 31 July 1916 (aged 25)
- Place of death: Delville Wood, France
- Position: Centre forward

Senior career*
Years	Team	Apps	(Gls)
- Oxford City
–1915	Brentford	2	(0)
- * Club domestic league appearances and goals

Henry George Purver (3 May 1891 – 31 July 1916) was an English professional footballer who played as a centre forward in the Southern Football League for Brentford.

== Personal life ==
As of 1911, Purver worked as a newspaper reader, and by the time of the First World War, he worked as a reporter for The Times. In July 1915, eleven months after the British entry into World War I, he enlisted in Hounslow as a private in the 24th Battalion of the Royal Fusiliers. Shortly after enlisting, Purver was gassed and underwent a lengthy period of convalescence, during which he married Margaret Clifford in October 1915. He returned to the frontline in April 1916 and was reported missing in action, presumed killed at Delville Wood on 31 July 1916. His body was never recovered and he is commemorated on the Thiepval Memorial.

== See also ==
- List of people who disappeared

== Career statistics ==
Appearances and goals by club, season and competition
Club	Season	League			FA Cup		Total	
Club	Season	Division	Apps	Goals	Apps	Goals	Apps	Goals
Brentford	1911–12	Southern League First Division	2	0	0	0	2	0
Career total			2	0	0	0	2	0
