= Joe Hisbent =

English footballer

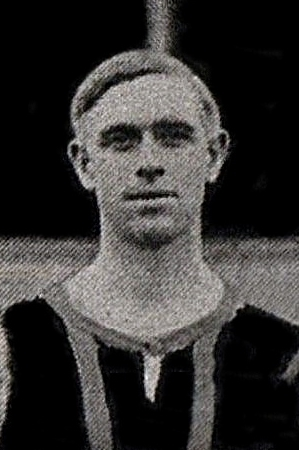
- Hisbent with Brentford in 1909.

Personal information
- Full name: Joseph Henry Hisbent
- Date of birth: 29 December 1881
- Place of birth: Plymouth, England
- Date of death: March 1953 (aged 71)
- Place of death: Plymouth, England
- Position: Right back

Senior career*
Years	Team	Apps	(Gls)
- Green Waves
1905–1906	Aston Villa	2	(0)
1906–1908	Portsmouth		
1908–1910	Brentford	16	(0)
1910–1911	Darlington		
1911–1914	Middlesbrough	44	(0)
1915–1916	→ Brentford (guest)	18	(0)
- * Club domestic league appearances and goals

Joseph Henry Hisbent (29 December 1881 – March 1953) was an English professional footballer who played as a right back in the Football League for Middlesbrough and Aston Villa.

== Personal life ==
Along with some of his Middlesbrough teammates, Hisbent enlisted in the 12th (Service) Battalion of the Yorkshire Regiment during the First World War. He held the rank of corporal and later served in the Worcestershire Regiment.

== Career statistics ==
Appearances and goals by club, season and competition
Club	Season	League			FA Cup		Total	
Club	Season	Division	Apps	Goals	Apps	Goals	Apps	Goals
Aston Villa	1905–06	First Division	2	0	0	0	2	0
Brentford	1908–09	Southern League First Division	16	0	0	0	16	0
Middlesbrough	1911–12	First Division	11	0	0	0	11	0
Middlesbrough	1912–13	First Division	22	0	3	0	25	0
Middlesbrough	1913–14	First Division	10	0	0	0	10	0
Middlesbrough	1914–15	First Division	1	0	0	0	1	0
Middlesbrough	Total		44	0	3	0	47	0
Career total			62	0	3	0	65	0
