= John Lamb (footballer) =

English footballer

Personal information
- Full name: John Wright Lamb
- Date of birth: 25 July 1889
- Place of birth: Clay Cross, England
- Date of death: 1951 (aged 61–62)
- Place of death: Derby, England
- Position: Half back

Senior career*
Years	Team	Apps	(Gls)
- Bolsover Colliery
1913–1919	The Wednesday	5	(0)
1915–1917	→ Brentford (guest)	9	(0)
1920–1921	Luton Town	24	(0)
- Matlock Town
- * Club domestic league appearances and goals

John Lamb (25 July 1889 – 1951) was an English professional footballer who played as a half back in the Football League for Luton Town and The Wednesday. He began his career as a centre forward in non-League football with Bolsover Colliery and was converted into a half back at The Wednesday.

== Personal life ==
Lamb served as a private in the Football Battalion of the Middlesex Regiment during the First World War. After the war, the effects of wounds received on the Somme prematurely ended his Football League career in 1921.

== Career statistics ==
Appearances and goals by club, season and competition
Club	Season	League			FA Cup		Total	
Club	Season	Division	Apps	Goals	Apps	Goals	Apps	Goals
The Wednesday	1913–14	First Division	2	0	0	0	2	0
The Wednesday	1919–20	First Division	3	0	0	0	3	0
The Wednesday	Total		5	0	0	0	5	0
Luton Town	1920–21	Third Division	24	0	4	0	28	0
Career total			29	0	4	0	33	0
