= Henery =

Henery may refer to:

== People ==
- Alex Henery (born 1987), American football player
- Alex Henery, guitarist from Basement (band)
- John Henery, English footballer
- Marion Henery (1910–2001), Scottish communist activist
- Perceval Henery (1859–1938), English cricketer

== Other uses ==
- Henery Hawk, a cartoon character
- Henhouse Henery, a short film
- I'm Henery the Eighth, I Am, 1910 British song

== See also ==
- Henry (disambiguation)
