= 1920–21 Brentford F.C. season =

English football team season

Brentford
1920–21 season
- Chairman: H. Jason-Saunders
- Secretary Manager: Fred Halliday
- Stadium: Griffin Park
- Third Division: 21st
- FA Cup: First round
- Top goalscorer: League: King (17); All: King (18)
- Highest home attendance: 16,379
- Lowest home attendance: 4,000
- Average home league attendance: 8,660
Home colours

During the 1920–21 English football season, Brentford competed in the Football League Third Division. It was Brentford's inaugural season in the Football League and ended with the club successfully applying for re-election.

== Season summary ==
Harry King was the leading goalscorer during the season and was the first Brentford player to register a Football League hattrick.

After 18 seasons as members of the Southern League, Brentford were named as founder members of the new Football League Third Division for the 1920–21 campaign. In preparation, 11 new players were signed and £2,000 was spent on improvements to Griffin Park. Despite flirting with a position in mid-table during August and September 1920, the club endured a torrid season, sinking to the re-election places by October and largely remaining there for the rest of the season. The FA Cup was exited in the first round. Brentford successfully applied for re-election to the Football League at the end of the season without going to a poll. Three directors resigned after the season, due to a deficit of nearly £6,000 (equivalent to £336,200 in 2023).

The goalscoring of former Arsenal forward Harry King provided one of the rare bright spots of the season, with his 18 goals accounting for nearly half that of the team's total. King also became the first Brentford player to register a Football League hat-trick in a 5–0 thrashing of Grimsby Town on 28 March 1921, the Bees' biggest win of the season. The result established the club record for the highest winning margin in a Football League match, which would stand until broken in September 1929. Secretary manager Fred Halliday stood down after the season and reverted to an administrative role within the club. Management adviser Billy Brawn also stepped down. Brentford's 9 league victories during the season is the joint-fewest in the club's history and Jimmy Hodson became the club's record-oldest player when he appeared in the final match of the season at age 40 years, 8 months and two days.

== League table ==
Pos	Team	Pld	W	D	L	GF	GA	GR	Pts	Promotion
18	Brighton & Hove Albion	42	14	8	20	42	61	0.689	36	
19	Exeter City	42	10	15	17	39	54	0.722	35	
20	Reading	42	12	7	23	42	59	0.712	31	
21	Brentford	42	9	12	21	42	67	0.627	30	Re-elected
22	Gillingham	42	8	12	22	34	74	0.459	28	Re-elected

Source: fchd.info

== Results ==
Brentford's goal tally listed first.

=== Legend ===
Win	Draw	Loss

=== Football League Third Division ===
No.	Date	Opponent	Venue	Result	Attendance	Scorer(s)
1	28 August 1920	Exeter City	A	0–3	6,000	
2	30 August 1920	Millwall	H	1–0	11,000	Boyne
3	4 September 1920	Exeter City	H	0–0	10,000	
4	6 September 1920	Millwall	A	0–0	15,000	
5	11 September 1920	Brighton & Hove Albion	H	2–0	8,000	Amos, Challinor
6	18 September 1920	Brighton & Hove Albion	A	0–4	5,500	
7	25 September 1920	Crystal Palace	H	0–4	13,000	
8	2 October 1920	Crystal Palace	A	2–4	15,000	King (2)
9	9 October 1920	Norwich City	A	0–0	9,000	
10	16 October 1920	Norwich City	H	3–1	8,000	King (2), Thompson
11	23 October 1920	Southampton	A	0–3	10,000	
12	30 October 1920	Southampton	H	1–1	7,000	Thompson (pen)
13	6 November 1920	Bristol Rovers	A	1–2	8,500	King
14	13 November 1920	Bristol Rovers	H	0–0	6,000	
15	20 November 1920	Reading	A	1–2	4,000	Spreadbury
16	27 November 1920	Reading	H	3–2	5,000	Boyne (2), King
17	4 December 1920	Luton Town	A	0–2	6,000	
18	11 December 1920	Luton Town	H	1–0	6,000	Boyne
19	18 December 1920	Newport County	H	2–2	6,000	King (2, 1 pen)
20	25 December 1920	Queens Park Rangers	H	0–2	16,379	
21	27 December 1920	Queens Park Rangers	A	0–1	25,000	
22	1 January 1921	Newport County	A	1–3	4,000	King
23	15 January 1921	Gillingham	A	3–1	7,000	Boyne (2), King
24	22 January 1921	Gillingham	H	3–3	7,000	Amos, King (pen), Boyne
25	5 February 1921	Swansea Town	H	1–2	7,000	Elliott
26	12 February 1921	Swindon Town	A	0–1	6,000	
27	19 February 1921	Swindon Town	H	0–1	10,000	
28	26 February 1921	Portsmouth	A	2–0	13,645	Henery, Anstiss
29	5 March 1921	Portsmouth	H	1–2	8,000	Boyne
30	12 March 1921	Watford	A	0–1	5,000	
31	19 March 1921	Watford	H	1–0	6,000	Anstiss
32	25 March 1921	Grimsby Town	A	0–2	8,000	
33	26 March 1921	Northampton Town	H	1–1	7,000	King
34	28 March 1921	Grimsby Town	H	5–0	7,000	King (3, 1 pen), Boyne, Anstiss
35	2 April 1921	Northampton Town	A	2–6	6,000	King, Elliott
36	9 April 1921	Southend United	H	2–2	4,000	Spreadbury, Boyne
37	16 April 1921	Southend United	A	1–4	6,000	Anstiss
38	25 April 1921	Merthyr Town	H	0–0	7,000	
39	28 April 1921	Swansea Town	A	1–1	5,000	King (pen)
40	30 April 1921	Merthyr Town	A	1–3	4,000	Challinor
41	2 May 1921	Plymouth Argyle	A	0–0	5,000	
42	7 May 1921	Plymouth Argyle	H	0–1	4,000	

=== FA Cup ===
Round	Date	Opponent	Venue	Result	Attendance	Scorer
R1	8 January 1921	Huddersfield Town	H	1–2	14,892	King

- Sources: Statto, 100 Years of Brentford, The Complete History

== Playing squad ==
Players' ages are as of the opening day of the 1920–21 season.

Pos.	Name	Nat.	Date of birth (age)	Signed from	Signed in	Notes
Goalkeepers
GK	Jack Durston	(England)	11 July 1893 (aged 27)	Queens Park Rangers	1919	Played when his cricket commitments allowed
GK	William Young	(England)	4 August 1892 (aged 28)	South Shields	1920	
Defenders
DF	Jimmy Hodson (c)	(England)	5 September 1880 (aged 39)	Belfast Celtic	1919	
DF	William Kearney	(England)	18 September 1895 (aged 24)	Sunderland Celtic	1920	
DF	Bertie Rosier	(England)	21 March 1893 (aged 27)	Southall	1913	
DF	Walter Spratt	(England)	14 April 1889 (aged 31)	Manchester United	1920	
Midfielders
HB	Alf Amos	(England)	9 February 1893 (aged 27)	Old Kingstonians	1913	
HB	Samuel Challinor	(England)	2 April 1890 (aged 30)	Tranmere Rovers	1920	
HB	Jimmy Elliott	(England)	1891 (aged 28–29)	Tottenham Hotspur	1920	
HB	Fred Howe	(England)	1895 (aged 24–25)	Kimberworth Old Boys	1920	
HB	Sam Morris	(England)	23 October 1886 (aged 33)	Unattached	1919	
Forwards
FW	Harry Anstiss	(England)	22 August 1899 (aged 21)	Hammersmith Athletic	1920	
FW	Reginald Boyne	(New Zealand)	16 November 1891 (aged 28)	Aston Villa	1919	
FW	Jack Cartmell	(England)	28 August 1890 (aged 30)	Unattached	1919	
FW	Herbert Cock	(England)	7 October 1900 (aged 19)	Unattached	1921	
FW	Patsy Hendren	(England)	5 February 1889 (aged 31)	Queens Park Rangers	1911	Played when his cricket commitments allowed
FW	John Henery	(England)	n/a	Houghton Rovers	1920	
FW	Harry King	(England)	4 January 1886 (aged 34)	Leicester City	1920	
FW	George Smith	(England)	n/a	South Shields	1920	
FW	Bert Spreadbury	(England)	30 April 1892 (aged 28)	Royal Ordnance Woolwich	1920	
FW	George Taylor	(England)	3 June 1900 (aged 20)	Brentford Thursday	1920	
FW	Alfred Thompson	(England)	28 April 1891 (aged 29)	Unattached	1919	
Players who left the club mid-season
HB	Ernest Levitt	(England)	2 April 1893 (aged 27)	New Silksworth	1920	Transferred to West Stanley
FW	Billy Baker	(England)	8 January 1894 (aged 26)	Unattached	1920	Transferred to Manchester City
FW	Fred Morley	(England)	1 March 1888 (aged 32)	Blackpool	1913	Released

- Sources: 100 Years of Brentford, Timeless Bees, Football League Players' Records 1888 to 1939

== Coaching staff ==
Name	Role
(England) Fred Halliday	Secretary Manager
(England) Billy Brawn	Advisory Manager
(England) Michael Witham	Trainer

== Statistics ==
=== Appearances and goals ===

Brentford's highest appearance-makers in each position during the Football League season.

Pos	Nat	Name	League		FA Cup		Total	
Pos	Nat	Name	Apps	Goals	Apps	Goals	Apps	Goals
GK	(England)	Jack Durston	24	0	0	0	24	0
GK	(England)	William Young	18	0	1	0	19	0
DF	(England)	Jimmy Hodson	33	0	1	0	34	0
DF	(England)	William Kearney	6	0	0	0	6	0
DF	(England)	Bertie Rosier	34	0	1	0	35	0
DF	(England)	Walter Spratt	4	0	0	0	4	0
HB	(England)	Alf Amos	35	2	1	0	36	2
HB	(England)	Samuel Challinor	31	2	1	0	32	2
HB	(England)	Jimmy Elliott	38	2	1	0	39	2
HB	(England)	Fred Howe	2	0	0	0	2	0
HB	(England)	Ernest Levitt	6	0	—		6	0
HB	(England)	Sam Morris	27	0	0	0	27	0
FW	(England)	Harry Anstiss	19	4	0	0	19	4
FW	(England)	Billy Baker	4	0	0	0	4	0
FW	(New Zealand)	Reginald Boyne	21	10	1	0	22	10
FW	(England)	Jack Cartmell	29	0	1	0	30	0
FW	(England)	Herbert Cock	1	0	—		1	0
FW	(England)	Patsy Hendren	2	0	—		2	0
FW	(England)	John Henery	20	1	1	0	21	0
FW	(England)	Harry King	33	17	1	1	34	18
FW	(England)	Fred Morley	16	0	1	0	17	0
FW	(England)	George Smith	9	0	0	0	9	0
FW	(England)	Bert Spreadbury	12	2	0	0	12	2
FW	(England)	George Taylor	23	0	0	0	23	0
FW	(England)	Alfred Thompson	15	2	0	0	15	2

- Players listed in italics left the club mid-season.
- Source: 100 Years of Brentford

=== Goalscorers ===
Pos.	Nat	Player	FL3	FAC	Total
FW	(England)	Harry King	17	1	18
FW	(New Zealand)	Reginald Boyne	10	0	10
FW	(England)	Harry Anstiss	4	0	4
HB	(England)	Alf Amos	2	0	2
HB	(England)	Samuel Challinor	2	0	2
HB	(England)	Jimmy Elliott	2	0	2
FW	(England)	Bert Spreadbury	2	0	2
FW	(England)	Alfred Thompson	2	0	2
Total			42	1	43

- Players listed in italics left the club mid-season.
- Source: 100 Years of Brentford

=== Management ===
Name	Nat	From	To	Record All Comps					Record League				
Name	Nat	From	To	P	W	D	L	W %	P	W	D	L	W %
Fred Halliday	(England)	28 August 1920	7 May 1921	43	9	12	22	20.93|	42	9	12	21	21.43

=== Summary ===
Games played	43 (42 Third Division, 1 FA Cup)
Games won	9 (9 Third Division, 0 FA Cup)
Games drawn	12 (12 Third Division, 0 FA Cup)
Games lost	22 (21 Third Division, 1 FA Cup)
Goals scored	43 (42 Third Division, 1 FA Cup)
Goals conceded	69 (67 Third Division, 2 FA Cup)
Clean sheets	12 (12 Third Division, 0 FA Cup)
Biggest league win	5–0 versus Grimsby Town, 28 March 1921
Worst league defeat	4–0 on two occasions, 6–2 versus Northampton Town, 2 April 1921
Most appearances	39, Jimmy Elliott (38 Third Division, 1 FA Cup)
Top scorer (league)	17, Harry King
Top scorer (all competitions)	18, Harry King

== Transfers & loans ==
Cricketers are not included in this list.

Players transferred in
Date	Pos.	Name	Previous club	Fee	Ref.
3 May 1920	DF	(England) William Kearney	(England) Sunderland Celtic	Free	
7 May 1920	DF	(England) Walter Spratt	(England) Manchester United	Free	
15 May 1920	HB	(England) Jimmy Elliott	(England) Tottenham Hotspur	Free	
17 June 1920	HB	(England) Ernest Levitt	(England) New Silksworth	Free	
17 June 1920	FW	(England) George Smith	(England) South Shields	Free	
23 July 1920	GK	(England) William Young	(England) South Shields	Free	
26 August 1920	HB	(England) Samuel Challinor	(England) Tranmere Rovers	Free	
August 1920	FW	(England) Harry Anstiss	(England) Hammersmith Athletic	Amateur	
3 September 1920	FW	(England) Harry King	(England) Leicester City	Free	
15 October 1920	FW	(England) Billy Baker	Unattached	Free	
29 October 1920	FW	T. Bainbridge	n/a	n/a	
18 December 1920	HB	(England) Fred Howe	(England) Kimberworth Old Boys	Free	
30 December 1920	n/a	J. Thomas	(England) Kimberworth Old Boys	n/a	
31 December 1920	FW	(England) George Taylor	(England) Brentford Thursday	Free	
7 February 1921	FW	(England) Herbert Cock	n/a	Amateur	
1920	FW	(England) Robert Bates	(England) Wolverhampton Wanderers	Amateur	
1920	DF	(England) Archie Reay	(England) Gnome Athletic	Free	
Players transferred out
Date	Pos.	Name	Subsequent club	Fee	Ref.
31 December 1920	HB	(England) Ernest Levitt	(England) West Stanley	n/a	
27 January 1921	n/a	J. Thomas	(England) Rotherham County	n/a	
9 February 1921	FW	(England) Billy Baker	(England) Manchester City	n/a	
Players released
Date	Pos.	Name	Subsequent club	Join date	Ref.
January 1921	FW	(England) Fred Morley	(United States) Philadelphia Field Club	1921	
May 1921	FW	(New Zealand) Reginald Boyne	Retired		
May 1921	HB	(England) Jack Cartmell	(England) Boscombe	1921	
May 1921	HB	(England) Samuel Challinor	(England) Halifax Town	July 1921	
May 1921	FW	(England) Herbert Cock	Retired		
May 1921	FW	(England) John Henery	(England) Darlington	1921	
May 1921	DF	(England) Jimmy Hodson	(England) Guildford United	May 1921	
May 1921	DF	(England) William Kearney	Retired		
May 1921	FW	(England) Harry King	Retired		
May 1921	HB	(England) Sam Morris	(England) Maidstone United	1921	
May 1921	FW	(England) George Smith	Retired		
May 1921	DF	(England) Walter Spratt	(England) Sittingbourne	1921	
May 1921	FW	(England) Bert Spreadbury	(England) Woolwich	1921	
May 1921	FW	(England) George Taylor	(England) Millwall	1921	
May 1921	FW	(England) Alfred Thompson	(England) Guildford United	1921	
