= 1919–20 Brentford F.C. season =

English football team season

Brentford
1919–20 season
- Chairman: H. Jason-Saunders
- Secretary Manager: Fred Halliday
- Stadium: Griffin Park
- Southern League First Division: 15th
- FA Cup: First round
- Top goalscorer: League: Boyne (13); All: Boyne (13)
- Highest home attendance: 15,000
- Lowest home attendance: 3,000
Home colours

During the 1919–20 English football season, Brentford competed in the Southern League First Division. In the first season of competitive football since the end of the First World War in November 1918, Brentford consolidated with a mid-table finish. It was the club's final Southern League season, as 21 of the 22 First Division clubs were voted into the new Football League Third Division in May 1920.

== Season summary ==
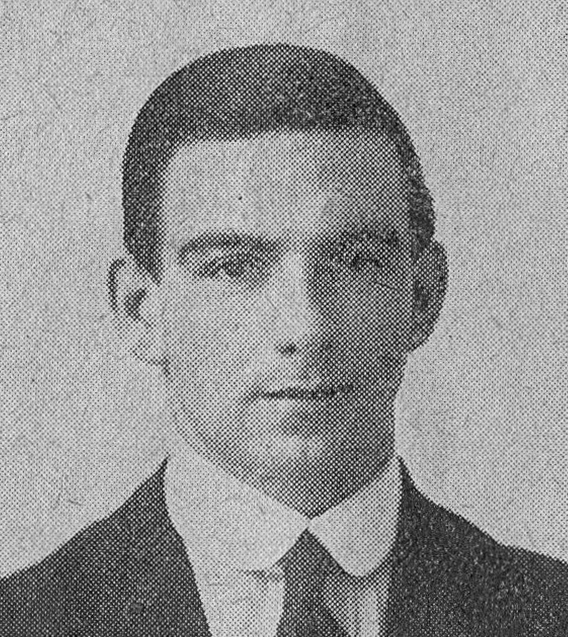
English-born New Zealander Reginald Boyne was Brentford's top-scorer during the season.

Despite talk that Brentford would seek election to the Football League after the wartime London Combination title success of the previous season, the directors of the club decided to remain in the Southern League Second Division. As it was, by virtue of the Southern League First Division being expanded to 22 clubs and the departures of West Ham United and Croydon Common (voted into the Football League and resigned respectively), Brentford, Merthyr Town, Swansea Town and Newport County were all elevated from the Second Division to the First Division.

Four years of war meant that secretary-manager Fred Halliday needed to rebuild and expand his squad, with prolific forwards Henry White and guest Jack Cock having left the club, in addition to full backs Jack Peart, Dusty Rhodes and half back Bill Stanton. The only survivors of Brentford's final pre-war squad who made appearance during the 1919–20 season were goalkeeper Ted Price, half back Tom McGovern and outside left Patsy Hendren.

New centre forward Reginald Boyne's six goals in the opening six matches ensured Brentford started the season well, but once his goals dried up, due to a niggling knee injury, the team was robbed of potency in attack. A 10-match winless streak ended when the team went on a five-match unbeaten run through November and December 1919. While manager Fred Halliday was able to field a more or less a settled XI, numerous players were tried in the centre forward position before the arrival of Bert Spreadbury in February 1920. Despite scoring four goals in his first five appearances, Spreadbury failed to help the team gain any consistency and Brentford finished the season in 15th position.

== League table ==
Pos	Team	Pld	W	D	L	GF	GA	GR	Pts	Qualification
13	Swindon Town	42	17	7	18	65	68	0.956	41	Elected to the new Football League Third Division
14	Millwall	42	14	12	16	52	55	0.945	40	Elected to the new Football League Third Division
15	Brentford	42	15	10	17	52	59	0.881	40	Elected to the new Football League Third Division
16	Brighton & Hove Albion	42	14	8	20	60	72	0.833	36	Elected to the new Football League Third Division
17	Bristol Rovers	42	11	13	18	61	78	0.782	35	Elected to the new Football League Third Division

Rules for classification: The system of using goal average to separate two teams tied on points was used up until the 1976-77 season. The points system: 2 points for a win, 1 point for a draw and 0 points for losing.

== Results ==
Brentford's goal tally listed first.

=== Legend ===
Win	Draw	Loss

=== Southern League First Division ===
No.	Date	Opponent	Venue	Result	Scorer(s)
1	30 August 1919	Brighton & Hove Albion	H	2–1	Boyne, Morley
2	1 September 1919	Millwall	H	2–2	Boyne, Gilboy
3	6 September 1919	Newport County	A	4–2	Boyne (2), Gilboy, Morley
4	8 September 1919	Millwall	A	2–0	Boyne, Thompson
5	13 September 1919	Portsmouth	H	0–2	
6	20 September 1919	Northampton Town	A	1–1	Boyne
7	24 September 1919	Exeter City	A	0–0	
8	27 September 1919	Crystal Palace	H	0–0	
9	4 October 1919	Southend United	H	1–3	Hendren
10	11 October 1919	Norwich City	H	1–1	Boyne
11	18 October 1919	Watford	A	0–1	
12	25 October 1919	Merthyr Town	A	0–2	
13	1 November 1919	Plymouth Argyle	H	0–0	
14	8 November 1919	Bristol Rovers	A	1–3	Cannon
15	15 November 1919	Reading	H	1–0	Amos
16	22 November 1919	Southampton	A	1–0	Morley
17	29 November 1919	Luton Town	H	3–1	Searby, Morley, Cartmell
18	6 December 1919	Gillingham	A	2–0	Morley, Hendren
19	13 December 1919	Swansea Town	H	1–1	Hendren (pen)
20	25 December 1919	Queens Park Rangers	A	0–2	
21	26 December 1919	Queens Park Rangers	H	2–1	Searby, Boyne
22	27 December 1919	Cardiff City	H	1–2	Thompson
23	3 January 1920	Brighton & Hove Albion	A	0–4	
24	17 January 1920	Newport County	H	2–1	Searby, Embury
25	24 January 1920	Portsmouth	A	0–3	
26	31 January 1920	Northampton Town	H	5–0	Boyne (3), Thompson, Hendren (pen)
27	7 February 1920	Crystal Palace	A	1–1	Thompson
28	14 February 1920	Southend United	H	2–0	Cartmell, Lockwood
29	21 February 1920	Norwich City	A	1–1	Spreadbury
30	28 February 1920	Watford	H	0–3	
31	6 March 1920	Merthyr Town	H	3–0	Spreadbury (2), Hendren
32	13 March 1920	Plymouth Argyle	A	2–3	Thompson (2)
33	20 March 1920	Bristol Rovers	H	3–0	Hendren, Morley, Spreadbury
34	27 March 1920	Reading	A	0–1	
35	2 April 1920	Swindon Town	H	2–0	Morley, Boyne
36	3 April 1920	Southampton	H	2–3	Taylor, Morley
37	5 April 1920	Swindon Town	A	1–3	Gilboy
38	10 April 1920	Luton Town	A	0–0	
39	17 April 1920	Gillingham	H	1–2	Thompson
40	24 April 1920	Swansea Town	A	0–6	
41	26 April 1920	Exeter City	H	2–1	Thompson, Boyne
42	1 May 1920	Cardiff City	A	0–2	

=== FA Cup ===
Round	Date	Opponent	Venue	Result	Scorer
R1	10 January 1920	Huddersfield Town	A	1–5	Morris

- Source: 100 Years of Brentford

== Playing squad ==
Players' ages are as of the opening day of the 1919–20 season.

Pos.	Name	Nat.	Date of birth (age)	Signed from	Signed in	Notes
Goalkeepers
GK	Jack Durston	(England)	11 July 1893 (aged 26)	Queens Park Rangers	1919	Played when his cricket commitments allowed
GK	Ted Price	(England)	13 June 1883 (aged 36)	Croydon Common	1912	
Defenders
DF	Edward Hawkins	(England)	31 October 1895 (aged 23)	Portsmouth	1919	
DF	Jimmy Hodson	(England)	5 September 1880 (aged 38)	Belfast Celtic	1919	
DF	Bertie Rosier	(England)	21 March 1893 (aged 26)	Southall	1913	
DF	Fred Webster	(England)	3 April 1887 (aged 32)	Unattached	1919	
Midfielders
HB	Alf Amos	(England)	9 February 1893 (aged 26)	Old Kingstonians	1913	
HB	Herbert Ashford	(England)	18 February 1896 (aged 23)	Southall	1919	
HB	Sam Morris	(England)	23 October 1886 (aged 32)	Unattached	1919	
HB	Fred Taylor	(England)	3 January 1884 (aged 35)	Unattached	1919	
Forwards
FW	Reginald Boyne	(New Zealand)	16 November 1891 (aged 27)	Aston Villa	1919	
FW	Jack Cartmell	(England)	28 August 1890 (aged 29)	Unattached	1919	
FW	Sidney Embury	(England)	12 June 1893 (aged 26)	Park Royal Athletic	1920	
FW	Bertram Gilboy	(England)	15 August 1894 (aged 25)	Unattached	1919	
FW	Patsy Hendren (c)	(England)	5 February 1889 (aged 30)	Queens Park Rangers	1911	Played when his cricket commitments allowed
FW	John Henery	(England)	7 November 1895 (aged 23)	Houghton Rovers	1920	
FW	Fred Morley	(England)	1 March 1888 (aged 31)	Unattached	1918	
FW	John Searby	(England)	2 September 1897 (aged 21)	Atherstone Town	1919	
FW	Bert Spreadbury	(England)	30 April 1892 (aged 27)	Royal Ordnance Woolwich	1920	
FW	Alfred Thompson	(England)	28 April 1891 (aged 28)	Unattached	1919	
Players who left the club mid-season
GK	Harry Dale	(England)	23 April 1899 (aged 20)	Hampstead Town	1919	Transferred to Reading
DF	Walter Loveday	(England)	30 June 1890 (aged 29)	Uxbridge	1920	n/a
HB	Tom McGovern	(Ireland)	11 November 1888 (aged 30)	Halifax Town	1913	Transferred to Queens Park Rangers
FW	George Cannon	(England)	15 February 1891 (aged 28)	Unattached	1919	Transferred to Wimbledon
FW	Ernest Hanks	(England)	6 April 1888 (aged 31)	Unattached	1919	n/a
FW	James Lockwood	(England)	20 February 1887 (aged 32)	n/a	1920	n/a
FW	Robert Parr	(England)	4 September 1899 (aged 19)	Unattached	1919	n/a

- Sources: 100 Years of Brentford, Timeless Bees, Football League Players' Records 1888 to 1939

== Coaching staff ==
Name	Role
(England) Fred Halliday	Secretary Manager
(England) Dusty Rhodes	Trainer

== Statistics ==
=== Appearances and goals ===

Brentford's highest appearance-makers in each position during the Southern League season.

Pos	Nat	Name	League		FA Cup		Total	
Pos	Nat	Name	Apps	Goals	Apps	Goals	Apps	Goals
GK	(England)	Harry Dale	1	0	—		1	0
GK	(England)	Jack Durston	20	0	1	0	21	0
GK	(England)	Ted Price	21	0	0	0	21	0
DF	(England)	Edward Hawkins	14	0	0	0	14	0
DF	(England)	Jimmy Hodson	34	0	1	0	35	0
DF	(England)	Walter Loveday	1	0	—		1	0
DF	(England)	Bertie Rosier	26	0	1	0	27	0
HB	(England)	Alf Amos	33	1	1	0	34	1
HB	(England)	Herbert Ashford	9	0	0	0	9	0
HB	(Ireland)	Tom McGovern	28	0	1	0	29	0
HB	(England)	Sam Morris	36	0	1	1	37	1
HB	(England)	Fred Taylor	22	1	0	0	22	1
FW	(New Zealand)	Reginald Boyne	27	13	1	0	28	13
FW	(England)	George Cannon	6	1	—		6	1
FW	(England)	Jack Cartmell	35	2	1	0	36	2
FW	(England)	Sidney Embury	4	1	0	0	4	1
FW	(England)	Bertram Gilboy	19	3	0	0	19	3
FW	(England)	Ernest Hanks	1	0	—		1	0
FW	(England)	Patsy Hendren	30	6	1	0	31	6
FW	(England)	John Henery	1	0	—		1	0
FW	(England)	James Lockwood	1	1	—		1	1
FW	(England)	Fred Morley	32	8	1	0	33	8
FW	(England)	Robert Parr	1	0	—		1	0
FW	(England)	John Searby	11	3	0	0	11	3
FW	(England)	Bert Spreadbury	10	4	—		10	4
FW	(England)	Alfred Thompson	28	8	1	0	29	8
FW	(England)	Fred Webster	11	0	0	0	11	0

- Players listed in italics left the club mid-season.
- Source: 100 Years of Brentford

=== Goalscorers ===
Pos.	Nat	Player	SL1	FAC	Total
FW	(New Zealand)	Reginald Boyne	13	0	13
FW	(England)	Fred Morley	8	0	8
FW	(England)	Alfred Thompson	8	0	8
FW	(England)	Patsy Hendren	6	0	6
FW	(England)	Bert Spreadbury	4	—	4
FW	(England)	Bertram Gilboy	3	0	3
FW	(England)	John Searby	3	0	3
FW	(England)	Jack Cartmell	2	0	2
HB	(England)	Alf Amos	1	0	1
FW	(England)	George Cannon	1	0	1
FW	(England)	Sidney Embury	1	0	1
FW	(England)	James Lockwood	1	0	1
HB	(England)	Fred Taylor	1	0	1
HB	(England)	Sam Morris	0	1	1
Total			52	1	53

- Players listed in italics left the club mid-season.
- Source: 100 Years of Brentford

=== Victory international caps ===
Pos.	Nat	Player	Caps	Goals	Ref
FW	(England)	Patsy Hendren	1	0	

=== Management ===
Name	Nat	From	To	Record All Comps					Record League				
Name	Nat	From	To	P	W	D	L	W %	P	W	D	L	W %
Fred Halliday	(England)	30 August 1919	1 May 1920	43	15	10	18	34.88|	42	15	10	17	35.71

=== Summary ===
Games played	43 (42 Southern League First Division, 1 FA Cup)
Games won	15 (15 Southern League First Division, 0 FA Cup)
Games drawn	10 (10 Southern League First Division, 0 FA Cup)
Games lost	18 (17 Southern League First Division, 1 FA Cup)
Goals scored	53 (52 Southern League First Division, 1 FA Cup)
Goals conceded	64 (59 Southern League First Division, 5 FA Cup)
Clean sheets	13 (13 Southern League First Division, 0 FA Cup)
Biggest league win	5–0 versus Northampton Town, 31 January 1920
Worst league defeat	6–0 versus Swansea Town, 24 April 1920
Most appearances	37, Sam Morris (36 Southern League First Division, 1 FA Cup)
Top scorer (league)	13, Reginald Boyne
Top scorer (all competitions)	13, Reginald Boyne

== Transfers and loans ==
Players transferred in
Date	Pos.	Name	Previous club	Fee	Ref.
May 1919	FW	(Ireland) Mick O'Brien	(Scotland) Alloa Athletic	n/a	
17 June 1919	HB	(England) Sam Morris	Unattached	n/a	
17 June 1919	HB	(England) Fred Taylor	Unattached	n/a	
17 June 1919	FW	(England) Alfred Thompson	Unattached	n/a	
23 June 1919	FW	(England) Jack Cartmell	Unattached	n/a	
23 June 1919	DF	(England) Lionel Piggin	(England) Reading	n/a	
11 July 1919	DF	(England) Fred Webster	Unattached	n/a	
15 July 1919	DF	(England) Edward Hawkins	(England) Portsmouth	n/a	
17 July 1919	FW	(New Zealand) Reginald Boyne	(England) Aston Villa	n/a	
30 July 1919	FW	(England) Bertram Gilboy	Unattached	n/a	
2 August 1919	FW	(England) Ernest Hanks	Unattached	n/a	
2 August 1919	DF	(England) Jimmy Hodson	(Ireland) Belfast Celtic	n/a	
9 August 1919	FW	(England) Robert Parr	Unattached	n/a	
24 October 1919	GK	(England) Jack Durston	(England) Queens Park Rangers	n/a	
7 November 1919	FW	(England) John Searby	(England) Atherstone Town	n/a	
1919	FW	(England) George Cannon	Unattached	n/a	
1919	GK	(England) Harry Dale	(England) Hampstead Town	n/a	
December 1919	HB	(England) Herbert Ashford	(England) Southall	n/a	
February 1920	HB	(England) Bert Spreadbury	(England) Royal Ordnance Woolwich	n/a	
April 1920	FW	(England) John Henery	(England) Houghton Rovers	n/a	
1920	FW	(England) Sidney Embury	(England) Park Royal Athletic	n/a	
1920	FW	(England) James Lockwood	n/a	n/a	
Players transferred out
Date	Pos.	Name	Subsequent club	Fee	Ref.
1919	FW	(England) George Cannon	(England) Wimbledon	n/a	
1919	GK	(England) Harry Dale	(England) Reading	n/a	
1919	FW	(England) Ernest Hanks	n/a	n/a	
1919	FW	(England) Robert Parr	n/a	n/a	
1919	FW	(England) Henry White	(England) Arsenal	n/a	
1920	FW	(England) James Lockwood	n/a	n/a	
1920	DF	(England) Walter Loveday	n/a	n/a	
April 1920	HB	(Ireland) Tom McGovern	(England) Queens Park Rangers	n/a	
Players released
Date	Pos.	Name	Subsequent club	Join date	Ref.
August 1919	FW	(Ireland) Mick O'Brien	(England) Norwich City	August 1919	
November 1919	HB	(Scotland) Jimmy Kennedy	(England) Gillingham	26 November 1919	
May 1920	GK	(England) Herbert Ashford	(England) Queens Park Rangers	1 September 1920	
May 1920	FW	(England) Sidney Embury	n/a	n/a	
May 1920	FW	(England) Bertram Gilboy	(England) Gillingham	11 May 1920	
May 1920	DF	(England) Edward Hawkins	(England) Maidstone United	25 May 1920	
May 1920	GK	(England) Ted Price	(England) Queens Park Rangers	20 May 1920	
May 1920	DF	(England) Fred Webster	(England) Gainsborough Trinity	24 June 1920	
June 1920	DF	(England) Lionel Piggin	(England) Ilkeston Town	June 1920	
n/a	DF	(England) Dusty Rhodes	Retired		
