= Alfred Thompson (footballer, born 1891) =

English footballer

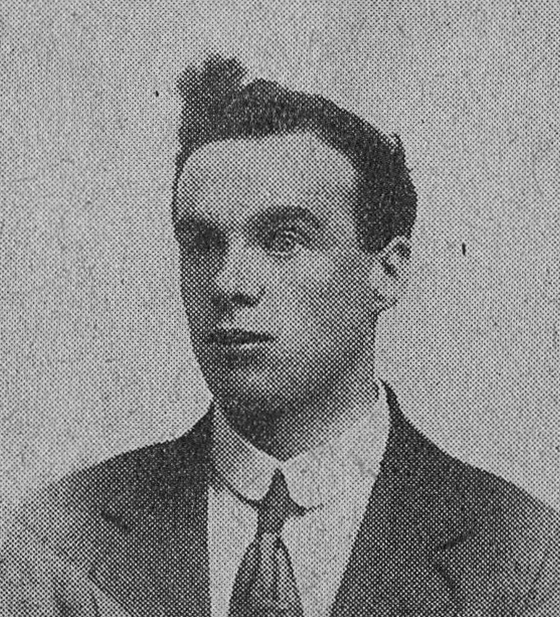
- Thompson while with Brentford in 1920.

Personal information
- Full name: Alfred Alexander Thompson
- Date of birth: 28 April 1891
- Place of birth: Manchester, England
- Date of death: 19 April 1969 (aged 77)
- Place of death: Waltham Forest, England
- Position: Inside forward

Youth career
- 1910–1913: Liverpool

Senior career*
Years	Team	Apps	(Gls)
1913–1914	Glossop	5	(2)
1914	Woolwich Arsenal	0	(0)
- Walsall
1919–1921	Brentford	43	(10)
1921–1922	Guildford United		
1922–1923	Queens Park Rangers		
1923–1923	Gillingham		
1923–1925	Sheppey United		
1925–1927	Sittingbourne		
1927–1928	Chatham		
1928–1930	Tunbridge Wells Rangers		
1930–1931	Ashford		
1931–1933	Canterbury Waverley		
1933–	Canterbury Amateurs		
- * Club domestic league appearances and goals

Alfred Alexander Thompson (28 April 1891 – 19 April 1969) was an English professional footballer who played in the Football League for Glossop and Brentford as an inside forward.

== Career ==
An inside forward, Thompson began his career in the Football League as a youth with Liverpool, before joining with Second Division team Glossop. He moved to Woolwich Arsenal, where he failed to make a first team appearance and instead spent his time with the club in the reserves. Thompson later dropped into non-League football and had a spell with Birmingham & District League club Walsall.

After the First World War, Thompson signed for Southern League First Division club Brentford. He scored eight goals in 28 appearances during the 1919–20 season and earned another shot at league football, with Brentford being elected into the new Football League Third Division South for the 1920–21 season. He managed 16 appearances and two goals and was released at the end of the season.

Thompson moved again into non-league football and linked up with former Brentford teammate Jimmy Hodson at Southern League South Division club Guildford United. He remained with Guildford for only one season and in the summer of 1922 signed with Queens Park Rangers. He did not make any league appearances for QPR nor at Gillingham with whom he was subsequently attached.

In late October 1923 Thompson joined Sheppey United of the Kent League and he remained with them for the following 1924–25 season, then he signed with their league rivals and near neighbours Sittingbourne for a two season stint between 1925 and 1927. He followed this with one season with Southern League Eastern Division club Chatham before joining, at the commencement of the 1928–29 season, Kent League club Tunbridge Wells Rangers. It was reported that during the five years preceding signing with Tunbridge Wells that Thompson had scored a total of 120 goals for Sheppey United, Sittingbourne and Chatham; he notched a further 38 in his first season with Tunbridge Wells and 48 in the second. There followed three more seasons for Thompson playing with Kent League clubs, 1930–31 with Ashford and 1931 to 1933 with Canterbury Waverley, after which he joined the newly formed (by the Waverley club) Canterbury Amateurs team playing in the Kent County Amateur League.

== Personal life ==
Thompson served as a gunner in the Royal Garrison Artillery during the First World War.

== Career statistics ==
Appearances and goals by club, season and competition
Club	Season	League			FA Cup		Total	
Club	Season	Division	Apps	Goals	Apps	Goals	Apps	Goals
Brentford	1919–20	Southern League First Division	28	8	1	0	29	8
Brentford	1920–21	Third Division	15	2	0	0	15	2
Career total			43	10	1	0	44	10
