= Ernest Levitt =

English footballer

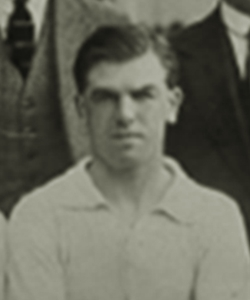
- Levitt while with Brentford in 1920.

Personal information
- Full name: Ernest Levitt
- Date of birth: 2 April 1893
- Place of birth: Silksworth, England
- Date of death: December 1979 (aged 86)
- Place of death: Durham, England
- Position: Centre half

Senior career*
Years	Team	Apps	(Gls)
	Dundee	0	(0)
- New Silksworth
1920	Brentford	6	(0)
- West Stanley
- Thornley Albion
- Wingate Albion
- * Club domestic league appearances and goals

Ernest Levitt (2 April 1893 – December 1979) was an English professional footballer who played as a centre half in the Football League for Brentford.

== Career ==
Born in the northeast of England, Levitt began his career in Scotland with Dundee. He returned home to Silksworth to play for the village team and was signed by Third Division club Brentford in June 1920. Levitt made six appearances at the beginning of the 1920–21 season, but lost his place in the team to Alf Amos and had his contract cancelled in December 1920. He returned to the northeast and played for non-League clubs West Stanley, Thornley Albion and Wingate Albion.

== Career statistics ==
Appearances and goals by club, season and competition
Club	Season	League			FA Cup		Total	
Club	Season	Division	Apps	Goals	Apps	Goals	Apps	Goals
Brentford	1920–21	Third Division	6	0	0	0	6	0
Career total			6	0	0	0	6	0
