= Walter Spratt =

English footballer

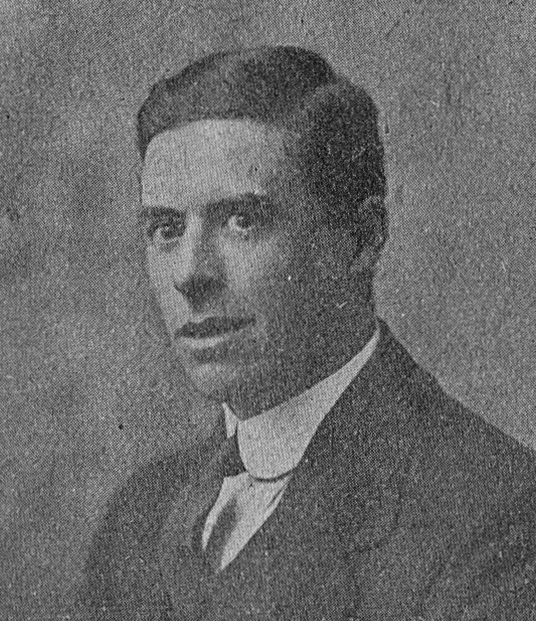
- Spratt in 1920.

Personal information
- Full name: Walter Spratt
- Date of birth: 14 April 1889
- Place of birth: Birmingham, England
- Date of death: 22 January 1945 (aged 55)
- Place of death: Southwark, England
- Height: 5 ft 10 in (1.78 m)
- Position: Full back

Youth career
- Meadow Hall

Senior career*
Years	Team	Apps	(Gls)
1910–1911	Rotherham Town		
1911–1915	Brentford	106	(1)
1915–1920	Manchester United	13	(0)
1915–1917	→ Chelsea (guest)	44	(4)
- → Clapton Orient (guest)
1920–1921	Brentford	4	(0)
1921–1922	Sittingbourne		
1922–?	Elsecar Main		
- * Club domestic league appearances and goals

Walter Spratt (14 April 1889 – 22 January 1945) was an English professional footballer who played as a full-back in the Football League for Manchester United and Brentford. Born in Birmingham, he began his career with Rotherham Town and made guest appearances for Clapton Orient during the First World War. After leaving Brentford in 1921, he played for Sittingbourne for a year, before ending his career with Elsecar Main.

== Career ==
=== Early career ===
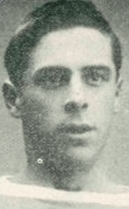
Spratt while with Brentford in 1911.

Born in Birmingham, Spratt began his career at Midland League club Rotherham Town in 1910, joining from local club Meadow Hall. A year later, he transferred to Southern League First Division club Brentford and made more than 100 appearances for the club before departing Griffin Park in early 1915.

=== Manchester United ===
In February 1915, Spratt joined Football League First Division club Manchester United. He initially joined on a one-month trial after being released by Brentford (along with all their other professional players). Despite this, Brentford demanded Manchester United pay a fee to sign Spratt; United initially refused, but an Inter-League Board inquiry later ruled that they pay a fee of £175. Spratt made his Football League debut on 6 February, playing at right-back in a 1–0 defeat to Sunderland. He made a total of 12 appearances during the 1914–15 season.

Due to the onset of the First World War, Spratt did not make any further competitive appearance for the Red Devils until the 1919–20 season. During the war, he played for Manchester United in the wartime leagues, as well as a guest for Chelsea and Clapton Orient. He was injured while playing for Clapton Orient and was not discharged from hospital until September 1919. He made his comeback from injury in a Manchester United reserve team game in January 1920, before making final appearance for the club a month later in a 1–0 defeat at home to Arsenal on 28 February.

=== Return to Brentford ===
Spratt returned to Brentford in May 1920, for the club's maiden Football League season. He made just four Third Division appearances, with his final game coming in a 2–0 defeat to West London rivals Queens Park Rangers on Christmas Day 1920. Spratt departed Brentford at the end of the 1920–21 season and made 123 appearances (scoring one goal) during his two spells with Brentford.

=== Sittingbourne ===
At the end of the 1920–21 season, Spratt moved to non-League club Sittingbourne and in 1922 he moved back to Yorkshire to end his career with Elsecar Main.

== Personal life ==
In 1906, Spratt served in the Royal Navy aboard HMS Boscawen III. After the outbreak of the First World War, he joined the Royal Naval Reserve in February 1915 and later served in the Royal Naval Air Service (and subsequently the Royal Air Force) on communications bases at Crystal Palace and RNAS Kingsnorth. While working as a despatcher for Mosers, Spratt was one of 35 people killed in a V-2 rocket attack on Southwark, London, on 22 January 1945.

== Career statistics ==
Appearances and goals by club, season and competition
Club	Season	League			FA Cup		Total	
Club	Season	Division	Apps	Goals	Apps	Goals	Apps	Goals
Brentford	1911–12	Southern League First Division	31	0	5	0	36	0
Brentford	1912–13	Southern League First Division	30	1	2	0	32	1
Brentford	1913–14	Southern League Second Division	30	0	3	0	33	0
Brentford	1914–15	Southern League Second Division	15	0	3	0	18	0
Brentford	Total		106	1	13	0	119	1
Manchester United	1914–15	First Division	12	0	—		12	0
Manchester United	1919–20	First Division	1	0	0	0	1	0
Manchester United	Total		13	0	0	0	13	0
Brentford	1920–21	Third Division	4	0	0	0	4	0
Brentford	Total		110	1	13	0	123	1
Career total			123	1	13	0	136	1
