= William Kearney =

William Kearney may refer to:

- William Kearney (judge) (born 1935), Australian judge
- William Kearney (footballer) (1895–1986), English footballer
- William Kearney (hurler) (born 1989), Irish hurler
- William Kearney, namesake of Kearney, Ontario
- William Kearney, a character in the Western 3 Godfathers
