= Bert Spreadbury =

English footballer

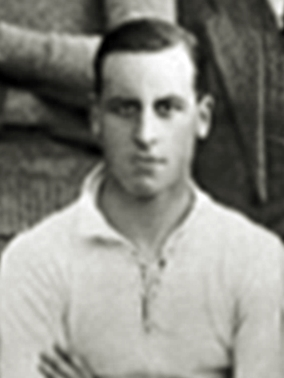
- Spreadbury while with Brentford in 1920.

Personal information
- Full name: Bertie Arthur Sydney Spreadbury
- Date of birth: 30 April 1892
- Place of birth: Plumstead, England
- Date of death: 19 November 1956 (aged 64)
- Place of death: Swansea, Wales
- Position: Centre forward

Senior career*
Years	Team	Apps	(Gls)
- Royal Ordnance Woolwich
1920–1921	Brentford	22	(6)
- Woolwich
- * Club domestic league appearances and goals

Bertie Arthur Sydney Spreadbury (30 April 1892 – 19 November 1956) was an English professional footballer who played as a centre forward in the Football League for Brentford.

== Career ==
Spreadbury began his career at Royal Ordnance Woolwich and joined Southern League First Division club Brentford in the second half of the 1919–20 season and scored four goals in 10 appearances. He was retained for the 1920–21 season, which was Brentford's first in the Football League. Behind Reginald Boyne in the pecking order, Spreadbury made just 12 appearances during the 1920–21 season and was released at the end of the campaign, after which he joined non-League club Woolwich.

== Career statistics ==
Appearances and goals by club, season and competition
Club	Season	League			FA Cup		Total	
Club	Season	Division	Apps	Goals	Apps	Goals	Apps	Goals
Brentford	1919–20	Southern League First Division	10	4	—		10	4
Brentford	1920–21	Third Division	12	2	0	0	12	2
Career total			22	6	0	0	22	6
