= Bertram Gilboy =

English footballer (1894–1974)

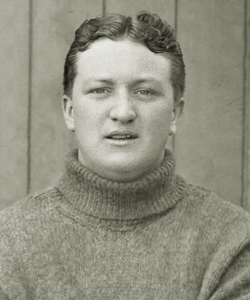
- Gilboy while with Swansea Town in 1914.

Personal information
- Full name: Bertram Tollett Gilboy
- Date of birth: 15 August 1894
- Place of birth: Islington, England
- Date of death: March 1974 (aged 79)
- Place of death: Southampton, England
- Position: Forward

Senior career*
Years	Team	Apps	(Gls)
1911–1912	Southend United	0	(0)
1912–1913	Huddersfield Town	3	(0)
1913–1914	Preston North End	0	(0)
1914–1915	Swansea Town	0	(0)
1919–1920	Brentford	19	(3)
1920–1921	Gillingham	0	(0)
1921–1922	Treherbert	0	(0)
- * Club domestic league appearances and goals

Bertram Tollett Gilboy (15 August 1894 – March 1974), sometimes mistaken as Gilroy, was an English professional footballer who played for Southend United, Huddersfield Town, Preston North End, Swansea Town, Brentford and Gillingham, before ending his career with Treherbert.

== Personal life ==
Gilboy served as a bombardier in the Royal Garrison Artillery and latterly as a private in the Labour Corps during the First World War.

== Career statistics ==
Appearances and goals by club, season and competition
Club	Season	League			FA Cup		Total	
Club	Season	Division	Apps	Goals	Apps	Goals	Apps	Goals
Huddersfield Town	1912–13	Second Division	3	0	0	0	3	0
Brentford	1919–20	Southern League First Division	19	3	0	0	19	3
Career total			22	3	0	0	22	3
