= Samuel Challinor =

English footballer

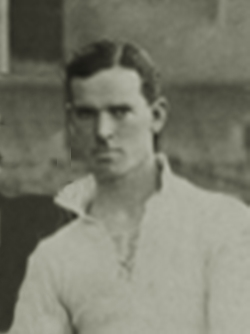
- Challinor while with Brentford in 1920.

Personal information
- Full name: Samuel Challinor
- Date of birth: 2 April 1890
- Place of birth: Middlewich, England
- Date of death: 15 March 1963 (aged 71)
- Place of death: Birkenhead, England
- Height: 5 ft 11 in (1.80 m)
- Position: Wing half

Senior career*
Years	Team	Apps	(Gls)
–1910	Middlewich		
1910–1913	Witton Albion		
1913	Everton	0	(0)
1919	Tranmere Rovers		
1920–1921	Brentford	31	(2)
1921–1922	Halifax Town	23	(2)
1922–1923	Accrington Stanley	23	(1)
1923–1924	New Brighton	40	(2)
1924–1925	Mold Town		
1925	Llandudno		
Total		117	
- * Club domestic league appearances and goals

Samuel Challinor (2 April 1890 – 15 March 1963) was a professional footballer who made over 100 appearances as a wing half in the Football League for Brentford, New Brighton, Halifax Town and Accrington Stanley.

== Playing career ==
Challinor began his career in non-League football with Combination and Lancashire Combination clubs Middlewich and Witton Albion respectively, before earning a move to the Football League with Everton. The outbreak of the First World War in 1914 denied Challinor the chance to make his professional debut for the Toffees. After the war, Challinor played for Tranmere Rovers and then joined Third Division club Brentford, for the Griffin Park club's debut Football League season in 1920. He made 32 appearances, scored two goals and was released at the end of a disastrous season, which saw the club forced to apply for re-election. Challinor played for League clubs Halifax Town, Accrington Stanley and New Brighton throughout the early/mid 1920s and ended his career in Wales with spells at Mold Town and Llandudno.

== Career statistics ==
Appearances and goals by club, season and competition
Club	Season	League			FA Cup		Total	
Club	Season	Division	Apps	Goals	Apps	Goals	Apps	Goals
Brentford	1920–21	Third Division	31	2	1	0	32	2
Career total			31	2	1	0	32	2
