= Harry Dale (footballer) =

English footballer

Personal information
- Full name: Harry James Dale
- Date of birth: 23 April 1899
- Place of birth: Woolwich, England
- Date of death: 5 February 1985 (aged 85)
- Place of death: Guildford, England
- Position: Goalkeeper

Senior career*
Years	Team	Apps	(Gls)
1919	Brentford	1	(0)
1920	Reading	1	(0)
- * Club domestic league appearances and goals

Harry James Dale (23 April 1899 – 5 February 1985) was an English professional footballer who played as a goalkeeper in the Football League for Reading.

== Career statistics ==
Appearances and goals by club, season and competition
Club	Season	League			FA Cup		Total	
Club	Season	Division	Apps	Goals	Apps	Goals	Apps	Goals
Brentford	1919–20	Southern League First Division	1	0	—		1	0
Reading	1920–21	Third Division	1	0	0	0	1	0
Career total			2	0	0	0	2	0
