= 1909–10 FA Cup =

Tournament details
- Country: England

Final positions
- Champions: Newcastle United (1st title)
- Runners-up: Barnsley

The 1909–10 FA Cup was the 39th season of the world's oldest association football competition, the Football Association Challenge Cup (more usually known as the FA Cup). Newcastle United won the competition for the first time, beating Barnsley 2–0 in the replay of the final at Goodison Park in Liverpool, through two goals from Albert Shepherd. The first match, held at Crystal Palace, London, was a 1–1 draw.

Matches were scheduled to be played at the stadium of the team named first on the date specified for each round, which was always a Saturday. If scores were level after 90 minutes had been played, a replay would take place at the stadium of the second-named team later the same week. If the replayed match was drawn further replays would be held at neutral venues until a winner was determined. If scores were level after 90 minutes had been played in a replay, a 30-minute period of extra time would be played.

== Calendar ==
The format of the FA Cup for the season had two preliminary rounds, five qualifying rounds, four proper rounds, and the semi-finals and final.

Round	Date
Extra preliminary round	Saturday 11 September 1909
Preliminary round	Saturday 18 September 1909
First round qualifying	Saturday 2 October 1909
Second round qualifying	Saturday 16 October 1909
Third round qualifying	Saturday 6 November 1909
Fourth round qualifying	Saturday 20 November 1909
Fifth round qualifying	Saturday 4 December 1909
First round proper	Saturday 15 January 1910
Second round proper	Saturday 5 February 1910
Third round proper	Saturday 19 February 1910
Fourth round proper	Saturday 5 March 1910
Semi-finals	Saturday 26 March 1910
Final	Saturday 23 April 1910

== Qualifying rounds ==
Only one Football League club, the recently re-elected Lincoln City, was required to enter this season's tournament in the qualifying rounds. Entered in the fourth qualifying round, Lincoln lost to Crewe Alexandra in their one and only match, which meant this would be the first time that only non-league qualifiers progressed to the first round since 1891-92 (the season before the introduction of the Football League Second Division). The 12 clubs winning through were Stoke, Watford, Bishop Auckland, Shrewsbury Town, Carlisle United, Workington, Accrington Stanley, Southend United, Chesterfield, Coventry City, Leyton and New Brompton. Of these, only Southend United was featuring in the main draw for the first time, although Leyton's previous appearance at this stage had been back in 1877-78.

At the other end of the qualifying stages, the extra preliminary round had grown to include 44 teams this season. Most of these clubs were from the north of England or from the North Midlands, with only 10 of the sides based in towns or villages south of Birmingham. Elsecar Main, Atherton and Heanor United all reached the third qualifying round stage.

== First round proper ==
39 of the 40 clubs from the First and Second divisions joined the 12 clubs who came through the qualifying rounds.

Thirteen Southern League sides were also given byes to the first round to bring the total number of teams up to 64. These were:

Southampton Millwall Athletic Queens Park Rangers Crystal Palace Swindon Town Plymouth Argyle Reading	Portsmouth Northampton Town Bristol Rovers Norwich City West Ham United Brighton & Hove Albion

32 matches were scheduled to be played on Saturday, 15 January 1910. Ten matches were drawn and went to replays in the following midweek, of which one - the Leyton vs New Brompton match - went to a second replay at White Hart Lane five days later.

Tie no	Home team	Score	Away team	Date
1	Birmingham	1–4	Leicester Fosse	15 January 1910
2	Blackpool	1–1	Barnsley	15 January 1910
Replay	Barnsley	6–0	Blackpool	20 January 1910
3	Chesterfield	0–0	Fulham	15 January 1910
Replay	Fulham	2–1	Chesterfield	19 January 1910
4	Bristol City	2–0	Liverpool	15 January 1910
5	Burnley	2–0	Manchester United	15 January 1910
6	Bury	2–1	Glossop	15 January 1910
7	Preston North End	1–2	Coventry City	15 January 1910
8	Stoke	1–1	Newcastle United	15 January 1910
Replay	Newcastle United	2–1	Stoke	19 January 1910
9	Leyton	0–0	New Brompton	15 January 1910
Replay	New Brompton	2–2	Leyton	19 January 1910
Replay	Leyton	1–0	New Brompton	24 January 1910
10	Nottingham Forest	3–2	Sheffield United	15 January 1910
11	Blackburn Rovers	7–1	Accrington Stanley	15 January 1910
12	Grimsby Town	0–2	Bristol Rovers	15 January 1910
13	Wolverhampton Wanderers	5–0	Reading	15 January 1910
14	Middlesbrough	1–1	Everton	15 January 1910
Replay	Everton	5–3	Middlesbrough	19 January 1910
15	West Bromwich Albion	2–0	Clapton Orient	15 January 1910
16	Sunderland	1–0	Leeds City	15 January 1910
17	Derby County	5–0	Millwall Athletic	15 January 1910
18	Gainsborough Trinity	1–1	Southend United	15 January 1910
Replay	Southend United	1–0	Gainsborough Trinity	19 January 1910
19	Workington	1–2	Manchester City	15 January 1910
20	Woolwich Arsenal	3–0	Watford	15 January 1910
21	Stockport County	4–1	Bolton Wanderers	15 January 1910
22	Northampton Town	0–0	The Wednesday	15 January 1910
Replay	The Wednesday	0–1	Northampton Town	20 January 1910
23	Portsmouth	3–0	Shrewsbury Town	15 January 1910
24	West Ham United	1–1	Carlisle United	15 January 1910
Replay	West Ham United	5–0	Carlisle United	20 January 1910
25	Brighton & Hove Albion	0–1	Southampton	15 January 1910
26	Norwich City	0–0	Queens Park Rangers	15 January 1910
Replay	Queens Park Rangers	3–0	Norwich City	19 January 1910
27	Plymouth Argyle	1–1	Tottenham Hotspur	15 January 1910
Replay	Tottenham Hotspur	7–1	Plymouth Argyle	19 January 1910
28	Bradford City	4–2	Notts County	15 January 1910
29	Oldham Athletic	1–2	Aston Villa	15 January 1910
30	Crystal Palace	1–3	Swindon Town	15 January 1910
31	Chelsea	2–1	Hull City	15 January 1910
32	Bradford Park Avenue	8–0	Bishop Auckland	15 January 1910

== Second round proper ==
The 16 second-round matches were played on Saturday, 5 February 1910. Three matches were drawn, with the replays taking place in the following midweek fixture.

Tie no	Home team	Score	Away team	Date
1	Bristol City	1–1	West Bromwich Albion	5 February 1910
Replay	West Bromwich Albion	4–2	Bristol City	9 February 1910
2	Southampton	0–5	Manchester City	5 February 1910
3	Aston Villa	6–1	Derby County	5 February 1910
4	Wolverhampton Wanderers	1–5	West Ham United	5 February 1910
5	Sunderland	3–1	Bradford Park Avenue	5 February 1910
6	Everton	5–0	Woolwich Arsenal	5 February 1910
7	Swindon Town	2–0	Burnley	5 February 1910
8	Leicester Fosse	3–2	Bury	5 February 1910
9	Stockport County	0–2	Leyton	5 February 1910
10	Newcastle United	4–0	Fulham	5 February 1910
11	Barnsley	4–0	Bristol Rovers	5 February 1910
12	Northampton Town	0–0	Nottingham Forest	5 February 1910
Replay	Nottingham Forest	1–0	Northampton Town	9 February 1910
13	Portsmouth	0–1	Coventry City	5 February 1910
14	Bradford City	1–2	Blackburn Rovers	5 February 1910
15	Chelsea	0–1	Tottenham Hotspur	5 February 1910
16	Southend United	0–0	Queens Park Rangers	5 February 1910
Replay	Queens Park Rangers	3–2	Southend United	9 February 1910

== Third round proper ==
The eight third-round matches were scheduled for Saturday, 19 February 1910. There was one replay, between QPR and West Ham United, played in the following midweek fixture.

Tie no	Home team	Score	Away team	Date
1	Leyton	0–1	Leicester Fosse	19 February 1910
2	Aston Villa	1–2	Manchester City	19 February 1910
3	Everton	2–0	Sunderland	19 February 1910
4	Swindon Town	3–2	Tottenham Hotspur	19 February 1910
5	Newcastle United	3–1	Blackburn Rovers	19 February 1910
6	Queens Park Rangers	1–1	West Ham United	19 February 1910
Replay	West Ham United	0–1	Queens Park Rangers	24 February 1910
7	Barnsley	1–0	West Bromwich Albion	19 February 1910
8	Coventry City	3–1	Nottingham Forest	19 February 1910

== Fourth round proper ==
The four fourth-round matches were scheduled for Saturday, 5 March 1910. There were no replays.

Tie no	Home team	Score	Away team	Date
1	Swindon Town	2–0	Manchester City	5 March 1910
2	Newcastle United	3–0	Leicester Fosse	5 March 1910
3	Barnsley	1–0	Queens Park Rangers	5 March 1910
4	Coventry City	0–2	Everton	5 March 1910

== Semi finals ==
The semi-final matches were played on Saturday, 26 March 1910. Newcastle United and Barnsley won, going on to meet each other in the final.

26 March 1910
15:00

Newcastle United	2–0	Swindon Town

White Hart Lane, London

26 March 1910
15:00

Barnsley	0–0	Everton

Elland Road, Leeds

Replay

31 March 1910
15:00

Barnsley	3–0	Everton

Old Trafford, Manchester

== Final ==
The Final was contested by Newcastle United and Barnsley. The first game resulted in a score draw at Crystal Palace. Two goals scored by Albert Shepherd for Newcastle won the replay at Goodison Park.

=== Match details ===
23 April 1910
15:30 BST

Barnsley	1–1	Newcastle United
Tufnell 37'		Rutherford 83'

Crystal Palace
Attendance: 77,747
Referee: J.T. Ibbotson

Barnsley	Newcastle United

==== Replay ====
28 April 1910
15:30 BST

Barnsley	0–2	Newcastle United
		Shepherd 52' 62' (pen.)

Goodison Park
Attendance: 60,000
Referee: J.T. Ibbotson

Barnsley	Newcastle United

== See also ==
- FA Cup Final Results 1872-
