= Herbert Cock (English footballer) =

English footballer

Personal information
- Full name: Herbert Cock
- Date of birth: 7 October 1900
- Place of birth: Slough, England
- Date of death: January 1977 (aged 76)
- Place of death: Crawley, England
- Position: Forward

Senior career*
| Years | Team | Apps | (Gls) |
| 1920–1921 | Brentford | 1 | (0) |
| 1921 | Queens Park Rangers | 0 | (0) |
| | Arsenal | 0 | (0) |
- * Club domestic league appearances and goals

Herbert Cock (7 October 1900 – January 1977) was an English professional footballer who played as a forward and made one appearance in the Football League for Brentford.

== Career ==
In late January 1921, Cock joined Brentford on a contract running until the end of the 1920–21 season. He made one appearance in the Football League, playing in a 1–0 Third Division defeat to Plymouth Argyle on 7 May 1921. He subsequently joined Queens Park Rangers and then Arsenal in September 1921, but failed to make a senior appearance for either club.

== Personal life ==
Cock was the younger brother of footballers Jack and Donald. Prior to joining Brentford in January 1921, he served in the Royal Navy.

== Career statistics ==
Appearances and goals by club, season and competition
| Club | Season | League | | | FA Cup | | Total | |
| Club | Season | Division | Apps | Goals | Apps | Goals | Apps | Goals |
|---|---|---|---|---|---|---|---|---|
| Brentford | 1920–21 | Third Division | 1 | 0 | — | | 1 | 0 |
| Career total | | | 1 | 0 | 0 | 0 | 1 | 0 |
