= George Taylor (footballer, born 1900) =

English footballer

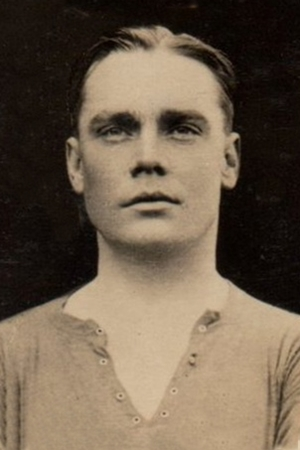
- Taylor while with Millwall in 1921.

Personal information
- Full name: George Hector Taylor
- Date of birth: 3 June 1900
- Place of birth: Brentford, England
- Date of death: September 1982 (aged 82)
- Place of death: Devizes, England
- Position: Outside right

Senior career*
Years	Team	Apps	(Gls)
1919–1920	Brentford Thursday		
1920–1921	Brentford	23	(0)
1921–1923	Millwall	23	(0)
1923	Clapton Orient	0	(0)
- * Club domestic league appearances and goals

George Hector Taylor (3 June 1900 – September 1982) was an English professional football outside right who played in the Football League for Brentford and Millwall.

== Career ==
An outside forward, Taylor joined hometown Third Division club Brentford for the club's debut season in the Football League in 1920–21. He broke into the team in November 1920 and took over the outside right position from George Smith. Taylor held onto his place until the end of the season, making 23 appearances, before being released. Taylor moved to Third Division South rivals Millwall in 1921 and later joined Clapton Orient, for whom he failed to make an appearance.

== Career statistics ==
Appearances and goals by club, season and competition
Club	Season	League			FA Cup		Total	
Club	Season	Division	Apps	Goals	Apps	Goals	Apps	Goals
Brentford	1920–21	Third Division	23	0	0	0	23	0
Millwall	1921–22	Third Division South	20	0	5	1	25	1
Millwall	1922–23	Third Division South	3	0	0	0	3	0
Millwall	Total		23	0	5	1	28	1
Career total			46	0	5	1	51	1
