= George Cannon (footballer) =

English footballer

Personal information
- Full name: George Frederick Cannon
- Date of birth: 15 February 1891
- Place of birth: Hammersmith, England
- Date of death: 4 January 1951 (aged 59)
- Place of death: Windsor, England
- Position: Inside right

Senior career*
Years	Team	Apps	(Gls)
- Richmond St. Elizabeth
- Mortlake Church Wanderers
- Mortlake Institute
- Mortlake Wednesday
–1914	Tooting		
1914	Fulham	6	(5)
1919	Brentford	6	(1)
1920–1921	Wimbledon		
- Margate
- * Club domestic league appearances and goals

George Frederick Cannon (15 February 1891 – 4 January 1951) was an English professional footballer who played as an inside right in the Football League for Fulham.

== Personal life ==
Cannon worked as a private secretary and served in the Royal Air Force during the First World War.

== Career statistics ==
Appearances and goals by club, season and competition
Club	Season	League			FA Cup		Total	
Club	Season	Division	Apps	Goals	Apps	Goals	Apps	Goals
Fulham	1914–15	Second Division	6	5	0	0	6	5
Brentford	1919–20	Southern League First Division	6	1	—		6	1
Career total			12	6	0	0	12	6
