= Donald Cock =

English footballer

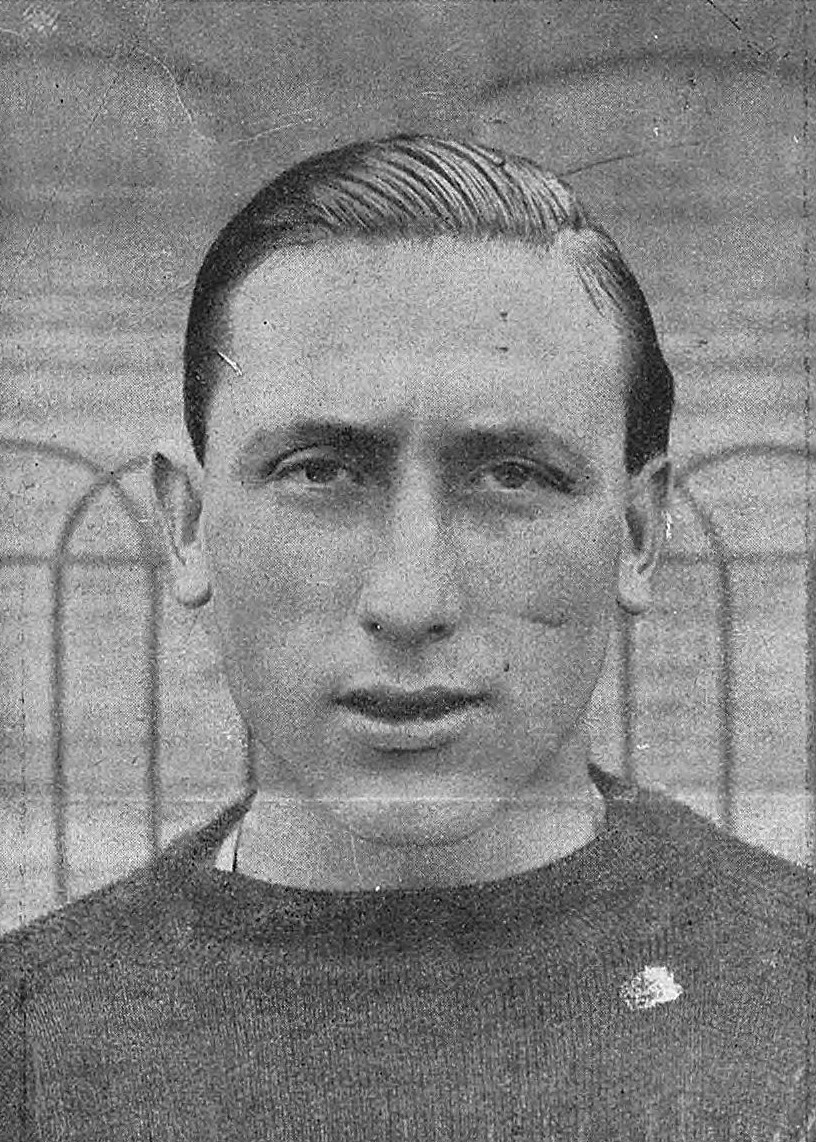
- Donald Cock (ca. 1925)

Personal information
- Full name: Donald James Cock
- Date of birth: 8 July 1896
- Place of birth: Hayle, Cornwall, England
- Date of death: 31 August 1974 (aged 78)
- Place of death: Wolverhampton, England
- Height: 5 ft 8 in (1.73 m)
- Position: Centre forward

Youth career
- Camborne Boys Brigade
- Gwynne's Foundry

Senior career*
Years	Team	Apps	(Gls)
1915–1919	Brentford	0	(0)
1919–1922	Fulham	86	(43)
1922–1925	Notts County	85	(32)
1925	Arsenal	3	(0)
1925–1927	Clapton Orient	64	(28)
1927	Wolverhampton Wanderers	3	(1)
1927	Newport County	0	(0)
- * Club domestic league appearances and goals

Donald James Cock (10 July 1896 – 31 August 1974) was an English footballer. He was the younger brother of England international Jack Cock and his other brother Herbert was also a footballer.

Born in Hayle, Cornwall, Cock started his professional career with Brentford during World War I. A striker, he moved to Fulham in 1919. In three seasons with the Second Division club, he averaged a goal every other game, and was the club's leading goalscorer in 1919–20 and 1920–21. He moved to Notts County in October 1922 and played nearly 100 games in three seasons there, being the club's top scorer in 1922–23 and 1923–24, winning the Second Division title in the former.

Cock's exploits at Notts County earned the eye of Arsenal and he was signed by Leslie Knighton in March 1925, making his debut for Arsenal against Bolton Wanderers on 7 March 1925. However, in his next match, against his former club Notts County at Meadow Lane, he was tackled strongly and broke his leg. He was out of action for five months and could not find favour under new manager Herbert Chapman. Cock only played one more game for Arsenal before being sold to Clapton Orient in October 1925.

Cock regained his form at Orient, becoming top scorer for the Second Division side in 1925–26 and 1926–27 before finishing his career with brief stints at Wolves and Newport County in 1927. He retired from professional football, aged 31, soon after. He died in 1974, aged 78.
