= George E. Smith (footballer) =

English footballer

George Smith
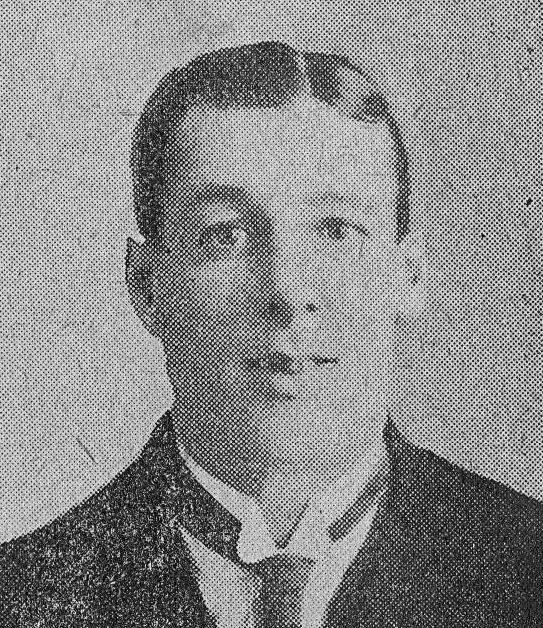
- Smith while with Brentford in 1920.

Personal information
- Full name: George E. Smith
- Place of birth: South Shields, England
- Position: Outside forward

Senior career*
Years	Team	Apps	(Gls)
1919–1920	South Shields	16	
1920–1921	Brentford	9	(0)
- * Club domestic league appearances and goals

George E. Smith was an English professional footballer who played as an outside forward in the Football League for Brentford.

== Career ==
An outside forward, Smith began his career at hometown Second Division club South Shields. He was one of a number of northeasterners to make the move to Third Division club Brentford for the club's first season in the Football League in 1920–21. Smith was included in the squad for the Bees' first-ever league match on 28 August 1920, but fell behind George Taylor in the pecking order and made just 9 appearances all season before being released.

== Career statistics ==
Appearances and goals by club, season and competition
Club	Season	League			FA Cup		Total	
Club	Season	Division	Apps	Goals	Apps	Goals	Apps	Goals
Brentford	1920–21	Third Division	9	0	0	0	9	0
Career total			9	0	0	0	9	0
