= Ernest Hanks =

English footballer

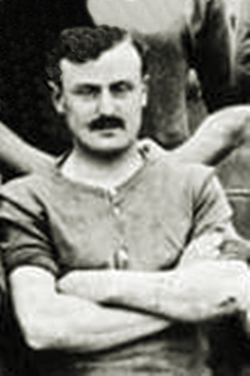
- Hanks while with Woolwich Arsenal in 1912.

Personal information
- Full name: Ernest Hanks
- Date of birth: 6 April 1888
- Place of birth: York Town, England
- Date of death: October 1965 (aged 77)
- Position: Centre forward

Senior career*
Years	Team	Apps	(Gls)
- Army Service Corps
1912–1913	Woolwich Arsenal	4	(1)
- Southend United
1919	Brentford	1	(0)
- * Club domestic league appearances and goals

Ernest Hanks (6 April 1888 – October 1965) was an English professional footballer who played in the Football League for Woolwich Arsenal as a centre forward.

== Personal life ==
Between 1904 and 1906, Hanks served in a militia battalion of the Princess Charlotte of Wales's (Royal Berkshire Regiment). He served as a corporal in the Army Service Corps during the First World War.

== Career statistics ==
Appearances and goals by club, season and competition
Club	Season	League			FA Cup		Total	
Club	Season	Division	Apps	Goals	Apps	Goals	Apps	Goals
Woolwich Arsenal	1912–13	First Division	4	1	0	0	4	1
Brentford	1919–20	Southern League First Division	1	0	—		1	0
Career total			5	1	0	0	5	1
