= Jimmy Elliott (footballer) =

English footballer and manager

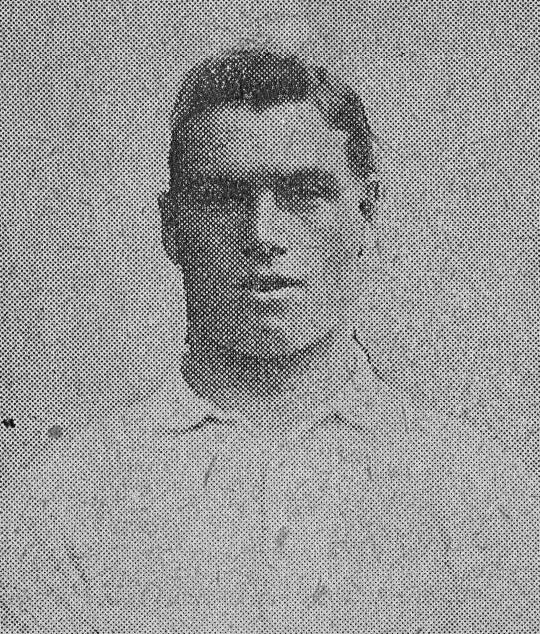
- Elliott while with Brentford in 1920.

Personal information
- Full name: James Edward Elliott
- Date of birth: 1891
- Place of birth: Peterborough, England
- Date of death: 1939 (aged 47–48)
- Position: Right half

Youth career
- South Weald
- Peterborough City

Senior career*
Years	Team	Apps	(Gls)
1912–1920	Tottenham Hotspur	13	(4)
1920–1922	Brentford	65	(2)
Total		78	(6)

Managerial career
- 1927–1929: Valencia
- 1932–1934: AIK
- 1935: Guatemala
- 1935-1938: Fenerbahçe
- 1938: FC Bern
- * Club domestic league appearances and goals

James Edward Elliott (1891–1939) was an English professional football player and manager.

== Career ==
=== Playing career ===
Born in Peterborough, Elliott spent his early career with non-league teams South Weald and Peterborough City, before turning professional in 1912 with Tottenham Hotspur, before later playing for Brentford.

=== Coaching career ===
Shortly after his retirement, Elliott became manager of Valencia. He coached the Spanish team between 1927 and 1929 and drove Valencia to the semi-finals of the Copa in 1928.

Elliott was manager of Swedish side AIK between 1932 and 1934. He later coached the Guatemalan national side and Fenerbahçe between 1935 and 1938. He then managed FC Bern.

== Career statistics ==
Appearances and goals by club, season and competition
Club	Season	League			FA Cup		Total	
Club	Season	Division	Apps	Goals	Apps	Goals	Apps	Goals
Tottenham Hotspur	1911–12	First Division	5	2	0	0	5	2
Tottenham Hotspur	1912–13	First Division	6	2	0	0	6	2
Tottenham Hotspur	1913–14	First Division	1	0	0	0	1	0
Tottenham Hotspur	1919–20	Second Division	1	0	0	0	1	0
Tottenham Hotspur	Total		13	4	0	0	13	4
Brentford	1920–21	Third Division	38	2	1	0	39	2
Brentford	1921–22	Third Division South	27	0	3	0	30	0
Brentford	Total		65	2	4	0	69	2
Career total			78	6	4	0	82	6
