= William Kearney (footballer) =

English footballer

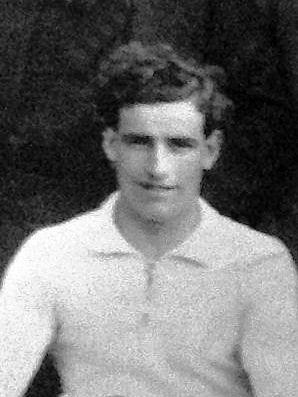
- Kearney while with Brentford in 1920.

Personal information
- Full name: William Kearney
- Date of birth: 18 September 1895
- Place of birth: Sunderland, England
- Date of death: December 1986 (aged 91)
- Place of death: Ealing, England
- Position: Full back

Senior career*
Years	Team	Apps	(Gls)
- Sunderland Celtic
1920–1921	Brentford	6	(0)
- * Club domestic league appearances and goals

William Kearney (18 September 1895 – December 1986) was an English professional football outside forward who played in the Football League for Brentford.

== Career ==
A full back, Kearney began his career with hometown non-league club Sunderland Celtic. He was one of a number of players from the northeast to move to Brentford during the club's early seasons in the Football League. Kearney made six Third Division appearances deputising for full back Jimmy Hodson during the 1920–21 season, after which he was released.

== Career statistics ==
Appearances and goals by club, season and competition
Club	Season	League			FA Cup		Total	
Club	Season	Division	Apps	Goals	Apps	Goals	Apps	Goals
Brentford	1920–21	Third Division	6	0	0	0	6	0
Career total			6	0	0	0	6	0
