= Herbert Ashford =

English footballer

Personal information
- Full name: Herbert Edwin Ashford
- Date of birth: 18 February 1896
- Place of birth: Fulham, England
- Date of death: September 1978 (aged 82)
- Place of death: Worthing, England
- Position: Left half

Senior career*
Years	Team	Apps	(Gls)
- Southall
1919–1920	Brentford	9	(0)
1920–1921	Queens Park Rangers	10	(0)
1922–1923	Notts County	0	(0)
1923	Ayr United	2	(0)
- Dartford
- Guildford United
- Tunbridge Wells Rangers
- * Club domestic league appearances and goals

Herbert Edwin Ashford (18 December 1896 – September 1978) was an English professional football left half who played in the Football League for Queens Park Rangers.

== Career statistics ==
Appearances and goals by club, season and competition
Club	Season	League			National Cup		Total	
Club	Season	Division	Apps	Goals	Apps	Goals	Apps	Goals
Brentford	1919–20	Southern League First Division	9	0	0	0	9	0
Queens Park Rangers	1920–21	Third Division	5	0	0	0	5	0
Queens Park Rangers	1921–22	Third Division South	5	0	0	0	5	0
Queens Park Rangers	Total		10	0	0	0	10	0
Ayr United	1923–24	Scottish League First Division	2	0	0	0	2	0
Career total			21	0	0	0	21	0
