= Elsecar Main F.C. =

Elsecar Main
- Full name: Elsecar Main Football Club
- Founded: (as Elsecar Athletic)

Elsecar Main F.C. was an English association football club based in Elsecar, Barnsley, South Yorkshire.

== History ==
The club was formed early in the 20th century as Elsecar Athletic and entered the FA Cup for the first time in 1906 after winning the Barnsley Minor Cup League in the previous season. They changed their name to Elsecar Main in 1908, but folded three years later.

Several clubs using the same name have been in existence since, most notably the incarnation that played in the Sheffield Association League and Sheffield & Hallamshire County Senior League from 1964 to 1991.

== Honours ==
- Barnsley Minor Cup League
  - Champions – 1905/06

== Records ==
- Best FA Cup performance: 3rd Qualifying Round, 1909–10
