= Reginald Boyne =

Footballer (1891–1963)

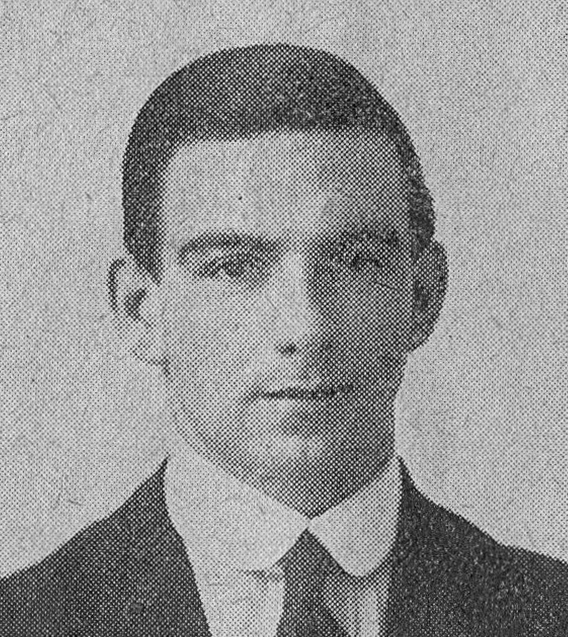
- Boyne while with Brentford in 1920.

Personal information
- Full name: Reginald Boyne
- Date of birth: 16 November 1891
- Place of birth: Leeds, England
- Date of death: 10 March 1963 (aged 71)
- Place of death: Auckland, New Zealand
- Position: Inside forward

Youth career
- Everton

Senior career*
Years	Team	Apps	(Gls)
1913–1919	Aston Villa	13	(0)
- → Notts County (guest)
1916–1917	→ Leicester Fosse (guest)	23	(2)
- → Loughborough Brush (guest)
1919–1921	Brentford	48	(23)
- * Club domestic league appearances and goals

Reginald Boyne (16 November 1891 – 10 March 1963) was a New Zealand professional footballer who played as an inside forward in the Football League for Aston Villa and Brentford.

== Career ==
=== Early years ===
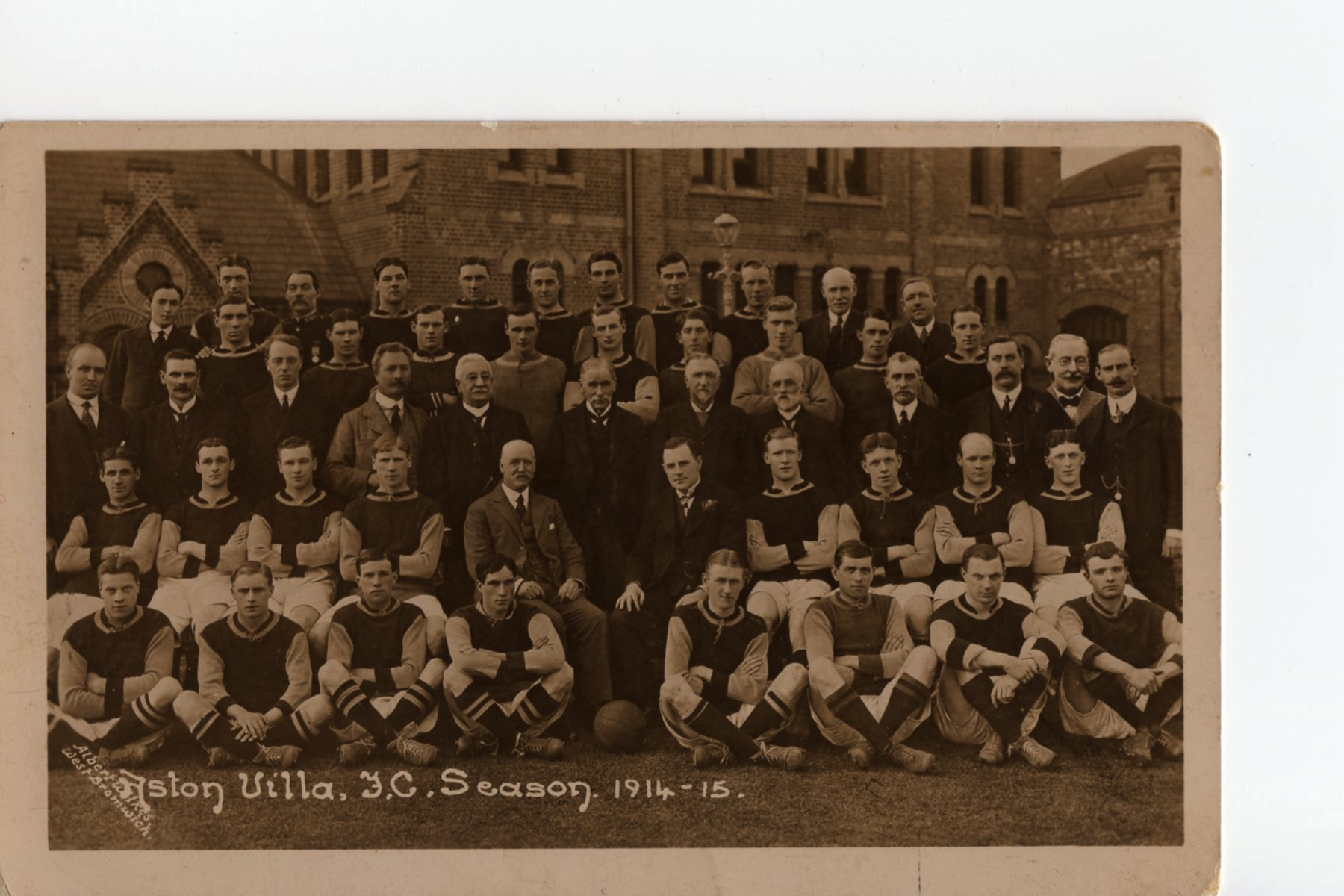

Boyne began his career in intermediate football in Auckland, New Zealand with Everton, which was named after the English club, before travelling to England to play junior football in Yorkshire.

=== Aston Villa ===
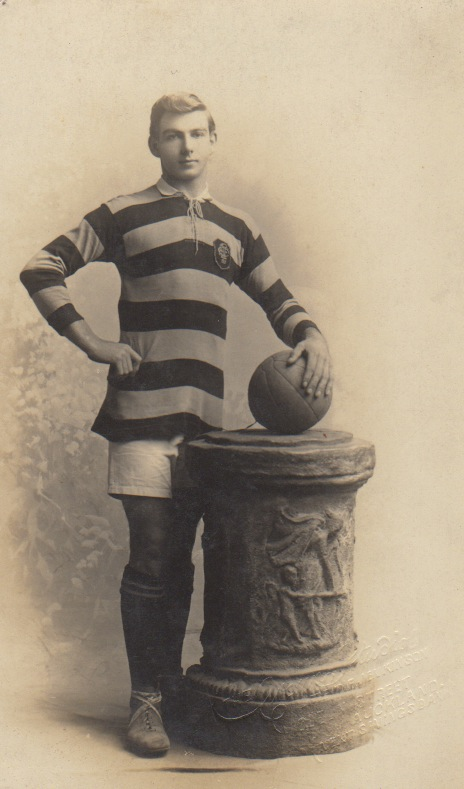

Boyne joined high-flying First Division club Aston Villa on trial in August 1913 and was awarded a professional contract in December that year. He made his professional debut in a 1–0 defeat to Bradford City on 27 December 1913. Boyne made just three further appearances during the 1913–14 season and only managed four appearances during the whole of the 1914–15 season, before competitive football was suspended due to the ongoing First World War. Boyne made a further five wartime appearances for Villa, before departing in August 1919.

==== Guest appearances ====
During the First World War, Boyne appeared as a guest for Notts County, Leicester Fosse and Loughborough Brush. He made 23 appearances and scored two goals in the Football League Midland Section for Leicester.

=== Brentford ===
Boyne joined Southern League First Division club Brentford in August 1919. Despite suffering with knee trouble, Boyne had a good 1919–20 season, top-scoring with 13 goals. He was retained for the 1920–21 season and received another chance at league football, with Brentford having entered into the newly created Third Division. Boyne had the honour of scoring Brentford's first Football League goal, which came with the only goal of the game versus Millwall on 30 August 1920. In a dire debut season (at the end of which the Bees had to apply for re-election), Boyne scored 10 goals in 22 games. He was released in May 1921 and returned to New Zealand.

== Personal life ==
Born in Leeds as the eldest son of William Boyne and Mary Ellen Waddington, Boyne emigrated to New Zealand with his family at a young age. Boyne's father was president of the Everton club in Auckland, where he and both his younger brothers, Harold and William played before the First World War broke out. Harold was killed in action on the Western Front on 21 February 1917.

== Career statistics ==
Appearances and goals by club, season and competition
Club	Season	League			FA Cup		Total	
Club	Season	Division	Apps	Goals	Apps	Goals	Apps	Goals
Aston Villa	1913–14	First Division	4	0	0	0	4	0
Aston Villa	1914–15	First Division	4	0	0	0	4	0
Aston Villa	Total		8	0	0	0	8	0
Brentford	1919–20	Southern League First Division	27	13	1	0	28	13
Brentford	1920–21	Third Division	21	10	1	0	22	10
Brentford	Total		48	23	2	0	50	23
Career Total			56	23	2	0	58	23
