= John Henery =

English footballer

Personal information
- Full name: John Henery
- Place of birth: Sunderland, England
- Height: 5 ft 7 in (1.70 m)
- Position: Outside left

Senior career*
| Years | Team | Apps | (Gls) |
- Houghton Rovers
| 1920–1921 | Brentford | 21 | (1) |
| 1921 | Darlington | 1 | (0) |
- * Club domestic league appearances and goals

John Henery was an English professional footballer who played as an outside left in the Football League for Brentford and Darlington.

== Career ==
Henery began his career with North Eastern League club Houghton Rovers, before competitive football was suspended due to the outbreak of the First World War in 1914. After the war, he joined Southern League First Division club Brentford towards the end of the 1919–20 season and made one appearance. He was retained the 1920–21 season, which would be the Griffin Park club's first in the Football League. Henery made 21 appearances and scored one goal during 1920–21, before being released at the end of the season and returning to his native northeast to join Third Division North club Darlington.

== Career statistics ==
Appearances and goals by club, season and competition
| Club | Season | League | | | FA Cup | | Total | |
| Club | Season | Division | Apps | Goals | Apps | Goals | Apps | Goals |
|---|---|---|---|---|---|---|---|---|
| Brentford | 1919–20 | Southern League First Division | 1 | 0 | — | | 1 | 0 |
| Brentford | 1920–21 | Third Division | 20 | 1 | 1 | 0 | 21 | 1 |
| Career total | | | 21 | 1 | 1 | 0 | 22 | 1 |
