= Fred Webster (English footballer) =

English footballer

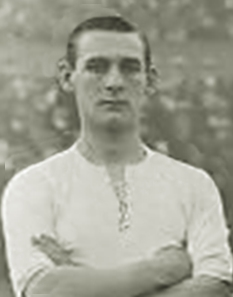
- Webster while with Tottenham Hotspur in 1913.

Personal information
- Full name: Frederick Joseph Webster
- Date of birth: 3 April 1887
- Place of birth: Sheffield, England
- Date of death: 14 September 1938 (aged 51)
- Place of death: Gainsborough, England
- Position: Full back

Senior career*
Years	Team	Apps	(Gls)
- Crown & Victoria (Sheffield)
1906–1911	Gainsborough Trinity	89	(0)
1911–1915	Tottenham Hotspur	82	(0)
1919–1920	Brentford	11	(0)
1920–1921	Gainsborough Trinity		
- * Club domestic league appearances and goals

Frederick Joseph Webster (3 April 1887 – 14 September 1938) was an English professional footballer who played for Crown & Victoria (Sheffield), Gainsborough Trinity, Tottenham Hotspur and Brentford.

== Football career ==
Webster played for Non league team Crown & Victoria (Sheffield) before joining Gainsborough Trinity in 1907, he played in 89 matches for the club. The full back signed for Tottenham Hotspur in 1911 and made a total of 86 appearances for the Spurs in all competitions. After leaving White Hart Lane, Webster went on to play for Brentford and finally returned to Gainsborough Trinity where he ended his senior career.
