= Perceval Henery =

English cricketer

Perceval Jeffery Thornton Henery (6 June 1859 – 10 August 1938) was an English first-class cricketer active 1879–94 who played for Middlesex. He was born in London; died in Washford.

He was educated at Harrow School for whom he played cricket.
