= Marion Henery =

- Born: Marion Jenkins; 29 April 1910; Cambuslang, Scotland
- Died: 15 September 2001; Coatbridge, Scotland.
- Known for: Communist activist and campaigner

Marion Henery (née Jenkins; 29 April 1910 – 15 September 2001) was a communist activist and hunger marcher from Cambuslang, Scotland.

== Early life and education ==
Henery was the daughter of stonemason Robert Jenkins and Mary Robertson, a farm servant. She was born on 29 April 1910 in Cambuslang, south of Glasgow, and was the youngest of eight children.

She attended socialist sunday school in Cambuslang before, at the age of 14, leaving school to attend a course at Skerry's College in Glasgow.

== Career and campaigning ==
Henery worked for a carpet manufacturer before she obtained a role at the United Mineworkers of Scotland. In 1931 at the age of 21, she took a full-time role at the Young Communist League (Scotland) as an organiser.

A year later, she was an organiser of a women's hunger march that started in Lancashire, England and finished in London. From 1933–1934, she attended the International Lenin School in the Soviet Union, which was an official training school operated in Moscow. She taught academic courses and underground political techniques.

In the 1950s, Henery was an active member of the Scottish Communist Workers Group (SWCG). Between 1956 and 1969, she organised weekend classes and schools for women.

During the mid-1960s, Henery worked as a secretary in the geriatric unit of Stobhill Hospital in the north of Glasgow. During this time, she was an active member of the National and Local Government Officers' Association trade union and campaigned for cervical cancer detection.

During her retirement in later life, Henery became the secretary of the Scottish Old Age Pensioners Campaign and was active with the Campaign for Nuclear Disarmament (CND).

== Personal life ==
In 1935, Marion married Joe Henery, a miner, and the couple had three children together.

Following her marriage in 1935, she moved to Welwyn Garden City, England in order to obtain work before returning to Scotland during World War II and staying at Auchinloch, near Kirkintilloch.

Henery died on 15 September 2001 in Coatbridge.
