= Harry King (footballer) =

English footballer

Personal information
- Full name: Henry Edward King
- Date of birth: 4 January 1886
- Place of birth: Northampton, England
- Date of death: 6 February 1968 (aged 82)
- Place of death: Worcester, England
- Height: 5 ft 9 in (1.75 m)
- Position: Centre forward

Youth career
- Evesham Star

Senior career*
Years	Team	Apps	(Gls)
1906–1907	Worcester City		
1907–1910	Birmingham	29	(6)
1910–1911	Crewe Alexandra		
1911–1914	Northampton Town	99	(68)
1914–1915	Arsenal	37	(26)
1919–1920	Leicester City	8	(1)
1920–1921	Brentford	33	(16)
- * Club domestic league appearances and goals

Henry Edward King (4 January 1886 – 6 February 1968) was an English footballer who made more than 100 appearances in the Football League.

== Biography ==
King was born in Northampton, Northamptonshire. He began his career at Evesham Star and Worcester City before joining Second Division club Birmingham in 1907. A centre forward, he scored 7 goals from 30 games over three seasons, but could not cement a first team place and left in 1910. Over the next four years, he had spells at non-league Crewe Alexandra and then Northampton Town.

In April 1914 he joined Arsenal for a £1,000 fee, returning to League football. Arsenal had just missed out on promotion on goal average to the First Division, and in 1914–15 King spearheaded their attack, scoring 26 goals in the League and another three in the FA Cup. These included the first hat trick scored at their new Highbury stadium (against Grimsby Town on 14 November 1914), and two four-goal hauls against Wolverhampton Wanderers and Nottingham Forest. King's 29 goals that season were an all-time club record at the time, remaining so until Jimmy Brain broke it in 1925–26. However, Arsenal's defence let them down and they only finished fifth, outside of the promotion places; eventually, they were re-elected back to the First Division when football resumed after the end of the First World War.

King had spent the war with the Royal Garrison Artillery in Italy, and also made over 30 appearances in unofficial wartime matches for Arsenal. By the time Arsenal's league campaign resumed in 1919, he was 33 and despite his heroics before the war, Arsenal decided to release him. He had played 39 official first-class matches in all for Arsenal, scoring 29 times. He joined Leicester City (scoring once in eight League appearances) for a £900 fee and finished his career at Brentford (16 goals in 33 appearances).
