= Jack Cock =

English footballer and manager (1893–1966)

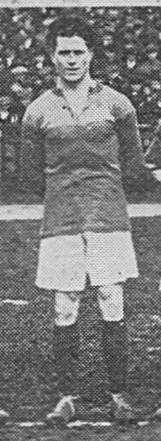
- Cock as a guest player at Brentford in 1919.

Personal information
- Full name: John Gilbert Cock
- Date of birth: 14 November 1893
- Place of birth: Hayle, England
- Date of death: 19 April 1966 (aged 72)
- Place of death: Kensington, England
- Height: 5 ft 11 in (1.80 m)
- Position: Centre forward

Senior career*
Years	Team	Apps	(Gls)
1908–1911	West Kensingston United		
1911–1912	Forest Gate		
1912–1914	Old Kingstonians		
1914	Brentford	3	(1)
1914–1919	Huddersfield Town	18	(9)
1917–1919	→ Brentford (guest)	48	(52)
1919–1923	Chelsea	99	(47)
1923–1925	Everton	69	(29)
1925–1927	Plymouth Argyle	90	(72)
1927–1930	Millwall	115	(77)
1931–1932	Folkestone		
- Walton & Hersham

International career
1919–1920	England	2	(2)

Managerial career
- 1944–1948: Millwall
- * Club domestic league appearances and goals

John Gilbert Cock MM MID (14 November 1893 – 19 April 1966) was an English footballer who played for various English club sides as a centre forward. He also had the distinction of being the first Cornishman to play for the England national team, a decorated World War I soldier, and an actor. His younger brothers, Donald Cock and Herbert Cock, also played professional football.

== Playing career ==
Born in Hayle, he started his football career with amateur clubs West Kensington United, Forest Gate and Old Kingstonians. He played three Southern League Division Two matches in March 1914 as an amateur for Brentford, scoring one goal, before signing professional forms with Yorkshire side Huddersfield Town later that year, though the First World War broke out shortly afterwards. He served in the British Army during the conflict, rising to the rank of Acting Sergeant-Major and earning the Military Medal for "Bravery in the Field" and a Mentioned in Despatches for "gallantry". He was reported as 'missing, presumed dead' at one point during the war. During his breaks from military service, he turned out for London sides Brentford and Croydon Common. While with Brentford, Cock scored six hattricks, a wartime record he shares with Len Townsend. Cock also played for England in the Victory International in 1919.

With the resumption of league football in 1919, he moved back to Huddersfield who, at the time, were in severe financial trouble. Cock was sold to David Calderhead's Chelsea for a record £2,500 in October that year. A skilful, nimble striker with a powerful shot, he had a fanatical dedication to fitness, often staying behind to train long after his teammates had gone home. He scored twice on his Chelsea debut against Bradford and hit 22 more that season in 30 league games, a key factor in the club finishing third in the League and reaching the FA Cup semi-finals.

Cock's first season with the Stamford Bridge club proved to be his most successful, and thereafter his goalscoring record was never as prolific, though he was still top scorer at the club in 1920–21 and 1921–22. After scoring one goal in 11 appearances in 1922–23, he was transferred to Everton in February 1923. He ended his Chelsea career with a nonetheless impressive 53 goals from 110 games. Cock remained on Merseyside for two years, before signing for Plymouth Argyle in March 1925, where he scored 72 League goals in just 90 games, including a club record 32 goals in 39 League games in 1926–27. However, the club finished 2nd in the Third Division South in each of his three seasons there and thus missed out on promotion. His playing career ended on a high note, though, when he moved to Millwall and scored 92 goals in 135 appearances, helping the club win the Division Three South title in 1927–28. His 77 League goals there remained a club record until 1973. He is Millwall's fourth all-time leading scorer, with 83 goals in all competitions.

Cock ended his first class playing career with 234 Football League goals from 391 matches. He wound down playing for non-league sides such as Folkestone and Walton & Hersham. He managed Millwall between 1944 and 1948, leading them to the War Cup South final at Wembley in 1945, where they lost to his old side Chelsea. The club's playing squad was hit hard by World War II and they were relegated at the end of the 1947–48 season; he left the job shortly afterwards.

He made his England debut against Ireland in 1919, and opened the scoring after 30 seconds, which is currently the third-fastest timed England goal of all time. He won a second (and final) cap against Scotland in 1920, again scoring.

Owing to his good looks and a tenor voice, Cock appeared on the music hall stage numerous times (during his playing days, he was known for singing before entering the pitch). He also starred in several films, including "The Winning Goal" (1920) and "The Great Game" (1930). He later ran a pub in New Cross. He died in Kensington on 19 April 1966, at the age of 72.

== Honours ==
Brentford

- London Combination: 1918–19

== See also ==
- List of solved missing person cases: pre–1950
