= Archie Reay =

English footballer (1901–1962)

Personal information
- Full name: Albert Frederick Reay
- Date of birth: 15 September 1901
- Place of birth: West Derby, Liverpool, England
- Date of death: 31 December 1962 (aged 61)
- Place of death: St Helens, England
- Position: Left back

Senior career*
Years	Team	Apps	(Gls)
- Gnome Athletic
1920–1922	Brentford	0	(0)
1922–1923	Gillingham	15	(0)
1923	Norwich City	2	(0)
- Guildford United
- Sheppey United
- * Club domestic league appearances and goals

Albert Frederick Reay (15 September 1901 – 31 December 1962) was an English professional footballer who played as a left back in the Football League for Gillingham and Norwich City.

== Career statistics ==
Appearances and goals by club, season and competition
Club	Season	League			FA Cup		Total	
Club	Season	Division	Apps	Goals	Apps	Goals	Apps	Goals
Gillingham	1922–23	Third Division South	15	0	2	0	7	0
Career total			15	0	2	0	7	0
