= Alf Amos =

English footballer

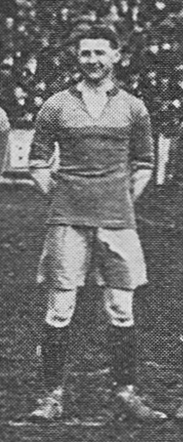
- Amos lining up for Brentford in 1919.

Personal information
- Full name: Alfred Herbert Amos
- Date of birth: 9 February 1893
- Place of birth: Forest Hill, England
- Date of death: 27 October 1959 (aged 66)
- Place of death: Dunstable, England
- Position: Wing half

Senior career*
Years	Team	Apps	(Gls)
–1913	Old Kingstonians		
1913–1922	Brentford	131	(5)
1922–1929	Millwall Athletic	217	(13)
- Hitchin Town

Managerial career
- 1930–1937: Hitchin Town
- * Club domestic league appearances and goals

Alfred Herbert Amos (9 February 1893 – 27 October 1959) was an English professional footballer who played as a wing half in the Football League for Brentford and Millwall. He is a member of the Millwall Hall of Fame.

== Career ==
A wing half, Amos began his career as an amateur with Old Kingstonians and joined Southern League Second Division club Brentford in 1913. He remained with Brentford during the First World War and was still a regular in the team when the club was admitted to the new Football League Third Division for the 1920–21 season. By the time Amos transferred to Millwall in 1922, he had made 139 appearances and scored five goals for Brentford. He remained with Millwall for seven seasons and was an ever-present in the team which finished the 1927–28 season as Third Division South champions, which secured promotion to the Second Division for the first time in the club's history. Amos' achievements were recognised posthumously with a place in the Millwall Hall of Fame. He finished his career with non-league club Hitchin Town and had a successful spell as the club's manager.

== Personal life ==
Amos served in the British Armed Forces during the First World War.

== Career statistics ==
Appearances and goals by club, season and competition
Club	Season	League			FA Cup		Total	
Club	Season	Division	Apps	Goals	Apps	Goals	Apps	Goals
Brentford	1914–15	Southern League Second Division	23	0	3	0	26	0
Brentford	1919–20	Southern League First Division	33	1	1	0	34	1
Brentford	1920–21	Third Division	35	2	1	0	36	2
Brentford	1921–22	Third Division South	40	2	3	0	43	2
Brentford	Total		131	5	8	0	139	5
Millwall	1922–23	Third Division South	40	2	3	0	43	2
Millwall	1923–24	Third Division South	39	4	0	0	39	4
Millwall	1924–25	Third Division South	25	0	1	0	26	0
Millwall	1925–26	Third Division South	24	2	5	2	29	4
Millwall	1926–27	Third Division South	37	3	5	0	42	3
Millwall	1927–28	Third Division South	42	2	1	0	43	2
Millwall	1928–29	Second Division	8	0	0	0	8	0
Millwall	Total		217	13	15	2	232	15
Career total			348	18	23	2	371	20

== Honours ==
=== Player ===
Brentford

- London Combination (1): 1918–19

Millwall

- Football League Third Division South (1): 1927–28

=== Manager ===
Hitchin Town

- Spartan League Premier Division (1): 1934–35
- Spartan League First Division second-place promotion (1): 1930–31
- Spartan League Challenge Cup (1): 1935
- AFA Senior Cup (1): 1931–32
- Herts Senior Cup (3): 1930–31, 1931–32, 1933–34

=== Individual ===
- Millwall Hall of Fame
