= Jimmy Hodson =

English footballer and manager

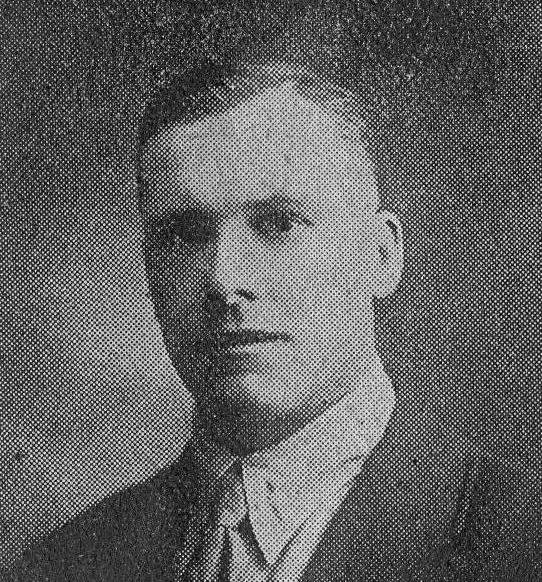
- Hodson while with Brentford in 1920.

Personal information
- Full name: James Hodson
- Date of birth: 5 September 1880
- Place of birth: Horwich, England
- Date of death: 27 February 1938 (aged 57)
- Place of death: Deventer, Netherlands
- Position: Full back

Senior career*
| Years | Team | Apps | (Gls) |
| 1900–1902 | St Helen's Recreation | | |
| 1902–1905 | Bury | 2 | (0) |
| 1905–1915 | Oldham Athletic | 252 | (1) |
| 1916–1918 | West Ham United | 49 | (0) |
| 1919 | Belfast Celtic | 0 | (0) |
| 1919 | Southport | 0 | (0) |
| 1919–1921 | Brentford | 68 | (0) |
| 1921–1922 | Guildford United | 56 | (7) |
| Total | | 427 | (8) |

Managerial career
- 1921–1922: Guildford United (player-manager)
- 1922–1925: Royal Berchem Sport
- 1937–1938: Go Ahead
- * Club domestic league appearances and goals

James Hodson (5 September 1880 – 27 February 1938) was an English professional footballer who played as a full back in the Football League for Oldham Athletic, Bury and Brentford. He later managed Guildford United and Belgian club Royal Berchem Sport.

== Playing career ==
=== Early years ===
Hodson began his career in his native north west with Lancashire Combination club St Helens Recreation in 1900 and transferred to First Division club Bury in 1902. He was a reserve during Bury's 1902–03 FA Cup-winning campaign.

=== Oldham Athletic ===
Hodson transferred to Oldham Athletic for a £15 fee and played in the club's very first Football League match in September 1907. He had a successful time with the club, winning promotion to the First Division in the 1909–10 season, reaching the FA Cup semi-finals in 1912–13 and finishing second in the First Division in 1914–15. The outbreak of the First World War in August 1914 saw competitive football suspended for the duration of the war after the close of the 1914–15 season, which brought Hodson's time with the Latics to an end. He made 252 league appearances and scored one goal during his time at Boundary Park.

=== First World War ===
In the midst of the First World War, Hodson joined London Combination club West Ham United. He contributed to the Combination title win in his first season and made 49 appearances for the Hammers, the last of which coming in a 3–1 defeat to eventual 1918–19 champions Brentford on 28 December 1918. Hodson had a spell at Belfast & District League club Belfast Celtic in the second half of the club's title-winning 1918–19 season. He also made two Lancashire Senior Cup appearances for Southport late in the 1918–19 season.

=== Brentford ===
Hodson transferred to Southern League First Division club Brentford in May 1919. He made 35 appearances and got another chance at League football in 1920, when the Bees were added to the new Third Division for the 1920–21 season. A week short of his 40th birthday, Hodson made his first Football League appearance since 1915 in Brentford's 3–0 defeat to Exeter City on 28 August 1920. He made 34 appearances during a dire season, after which the Bees had to apply for re-election. Hodson departed Brentford at the end of the campaign, after making 68 appearances for the club.

=== Guildford United ===
Hodson dropped back into non-League football to sign for Southern League English Section club Guildford United on 7 May 1921.

== Management and coaching career ==
Hodson combined his playing duties at Guildford United with that of the club's manager. After retiring as a player, Hodson moved to Belgium to take over as manager of First Division club Royal Berchem Sport in 1922. He managed the club to three mid-table finishes before departing at the end of the 1924–25 season.

== Career statistics ==
Appearances and goals by club, season and competition
| Club | Season | League | | | FA Cup | | Other | | Total | |
| Club | Season | Division | Apps | Goals | Apps | Goals | Apps | Goals | Apps | Goals |
|---|---|---|---|---|---|---|---|---|---|---|
| Bury | 1903–04 | First Division | 2 | 0 | 0 | 0 | — | | 2 | 0 |
| Oldham Athletic | 1910–11 | First Division | 24 | 0 | 0 | 0 | — | | 24 | 0 |
| Oldham Athletic | 1911–12 | First Division | 26 | 1 | 0 | 0 | — | | 26 | 1 |
| Oldham Athletic | 1912–13 | First Division | 34 | 0 | 0 | 0 | — | | 34 | 0 |
| Oldham Athletic | 1913–14 | First Division | 37 | 0 | 0 | 0 | — | | 37 | 0 |
| Oldham Athletic | 1914–15 | First Division | 37 | 0 | 5 | 0 | — | | 42 | 0 |
| Oldham Athletic | Total | | 158 | 1 | 5 | 0 | — | | 163 | 1 |
| Southport | 1918–19 | — | | | | | 2 (Note: Appearances in Lancashire Senior Cup) | 0 | 2 | 0 |
| Brentford | 1919–20 | Southern League First Division | 34 | 0 | 1 | 0 | — | | 35 | 0 |
| Brentford | 1920–21 | Third Division | 33 | 0 | 1 | 0 | — | | 34 | 0 |
| Brentford | Total | | 67 | 0 | 2 | 0 | — | | 69 | 0 |
| Career total | | | 227 | 1 | 7 | 0 | 2 | 0 | 236 | 1 |

== Honours ==
Oldham Athletic

- Lancashire Senior Cup: 1907–08

West Ham United

- London Combination: 1916–17

Belfast Celtic

- Belfast & District League: 1918–19
