= List of Brentford F.C. players =

English football squad

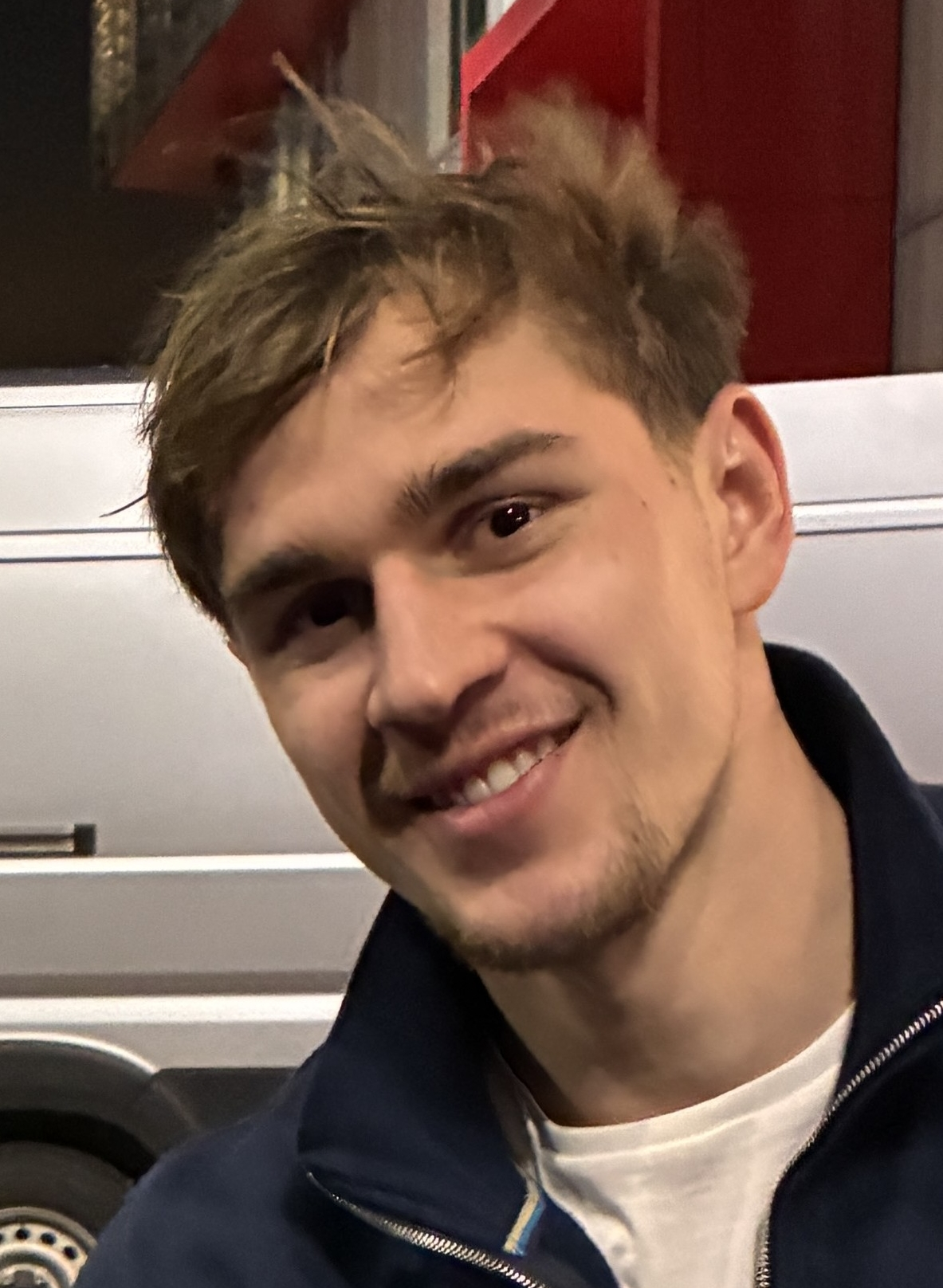
Current first team central midfielder Yehor Yarmolyuk is the most recent player to reach 100 appearances for Brentford.

Brentford Football Club is an English professional football club based in Brentford, Hounslow, London. Between 1897 and 1920, the first team competed in the London League, Southern League and Western League. Since 1920, the first team has competed in the Football League, the Premier League and other nationally and internationally organised competitions. All players who have played in 100 or more such matches are listed below.

== Records and notable players ==
Ken Coote holds the record for the greatest number of appearances for Brentford, with 559 made between 1949 and 1964. As of September 2026, three other players have made more than 500 appearances for Brentford – Jamie Bates, Peter Gelson and Kevin O'Connor. The club's goalscoring record is held by Jim Towers, who scored 163 goals in 282 appearances between 1954 and 1961. Adam Forshaw, Denny Mundee, Sam Sodje and Billy Sperrin all finished their Brentford careers on 100 appearances.

Current Brentford players who have made 100 or more appearances for the club are Kristoffer Ajer, Nathan Collins, Mikkel Damsgaard, Josh Dasilva, Rico Henry, Vitaly Janelt, Mathias Jensen, Keane Lewis-Potter, Kevin Schade and Yehor Yarmolyuk.

== Key ==
- Appearance and goal totals include matches in the Premier League, Football League, Southern League, London League (1896–1898), FA Cup, League Cup, Football League Trophy, Anglo-Italian Cup, London Challenge Cup, Middlesex Senior Cup, London Junior Cup, Middlesex Junior Cup, West Middlesex Cup, Southern Floodlit Challenge Cup, Football League Jubilee Fund and Empire Exhibition Cup. Substitute appearances are included. Wartime matches are regarded as unofficial and are excluded.
- "Brentford career" corresponds to the years in which the player made their first and last appearances.
- Players listed in **bold** won full international caps whilst with the club.
- Statistics are correct as of match played 18 September 2026.

=== Playing positions ===
GK	Goalkeeper	RB	Right back	RW	Right winger	DF	Defender	HB	Half back	IF	Inside forward	DM	Defensive midfielder
OL	Outside left	LB	Left back	LW	Left winger	CB	Centre back	FW	Forward	FB	Full back	RM	Right midfielder
W	Winger	MF	Midfielder	ST	Striker	WH	Wing half	AM	Attacking midfielder	CM	Central midfielder	LM	Left midfielder
U	Utility player	OR	Outside right	SW	Sweeper	LH	Left half	RH	Right half				

Symbol	Meaning
‡	Brentford player in the 2026–27 season.
*	Player has left Brentford but is still playing in a professional league.
♦	Player went on to manage the club.
(c)	Player captained the club.
♠	Player holds a club record.

== Players ==
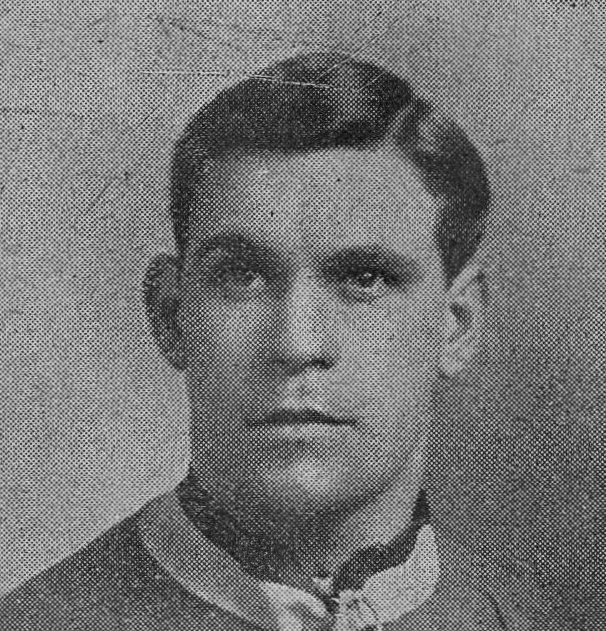
Outside left Patsy Hendren balanced cricket and football to make 308 appearances in two spells between 1907 and 1927.

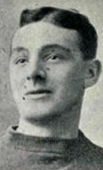
While "not a great footballer", Geordie Reid ended his time at Brentford as the club's record Southern League goalscorer.

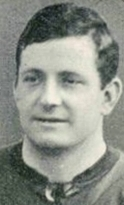
Full back Dusty Rhodes played for, captained and managed Brentford at varying times between 1908 and 1919.

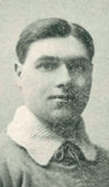
Archie Ling was the first goalkeeper to make 100 league appearances for Brentford.

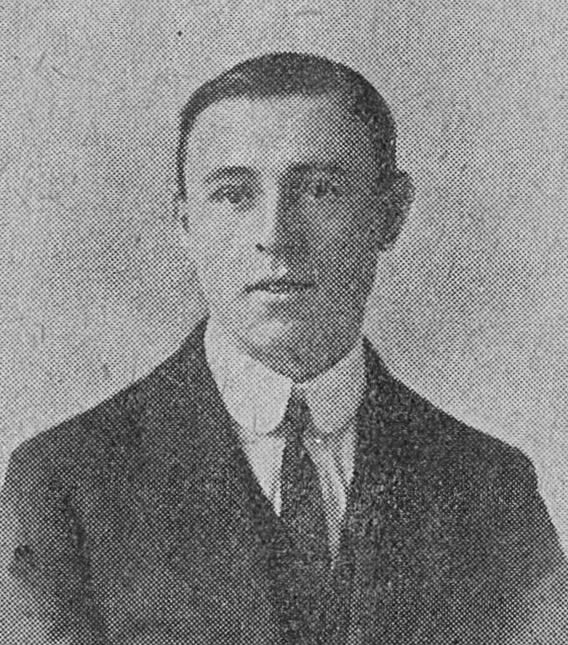
A local lad made good, full back Bertie Rosier made 127 appearances either side of the First World War.

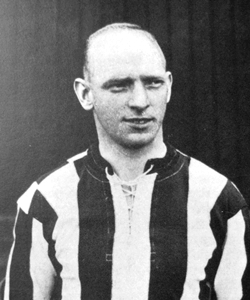
Inside forward Jack Lane captained Brentford during many of his 234 appearances between 1925 and 1931.

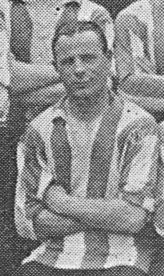
Forward Ernie Watkins was the first Brentford player to score 20 Football League goals in a season.

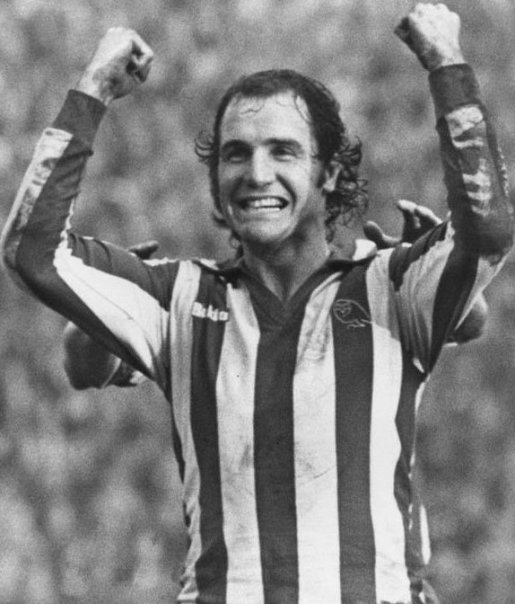
Andrew McCulloch scored 22 goals in 45 games during the 1977–78 season to help the club to promotion from the Fourth Division.

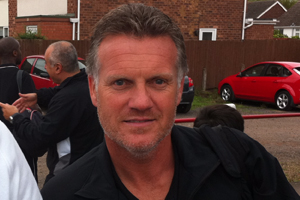
Andy Sinton made 182 appearances between 1985 and 1989 and won 12 England caps later in his career.

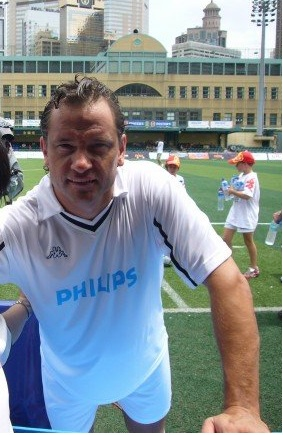
Dean Holdsworth scored 76 goals in 145 appearances between 1988 and 1992.

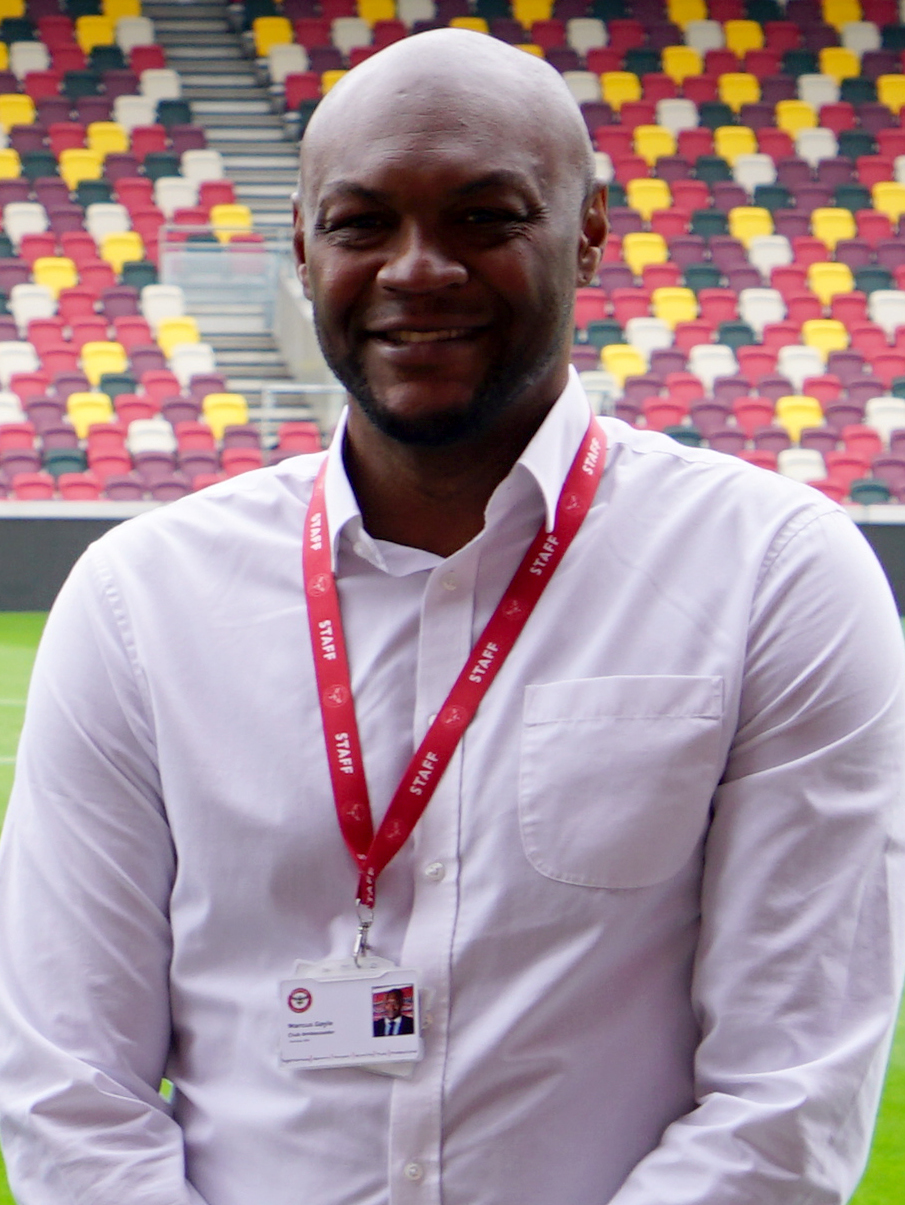
Marcus Gayle made 230 appearances across two spells with the club between 1988 and 2006.

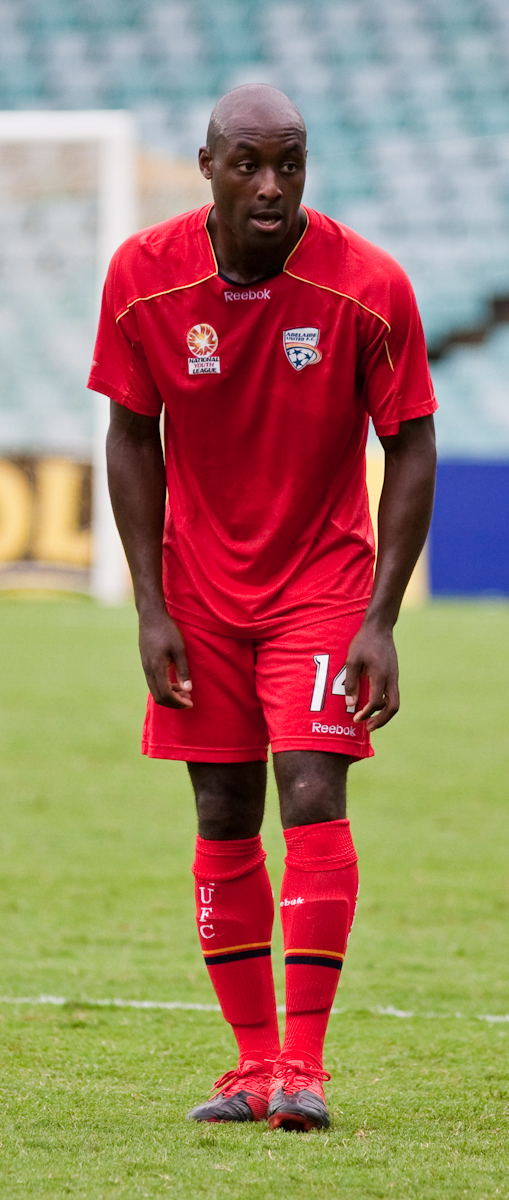
Ghanaian international Lloyd Owusu scored 87 goals in two spells between 1998 and 2007.

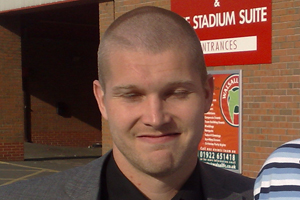
Michael Dobson made many of his 211 appearances as captain. His father George also played for the club.

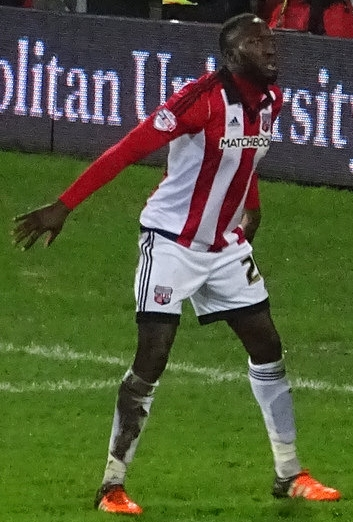
Until 2023, Toumani Diagouraga's 246 appearances was the club record for a player born outside the British Isles.

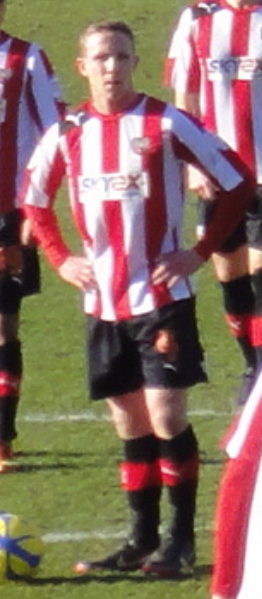
Central midfielder Adam Forshaw finished his Brentford career on 100 appearances.

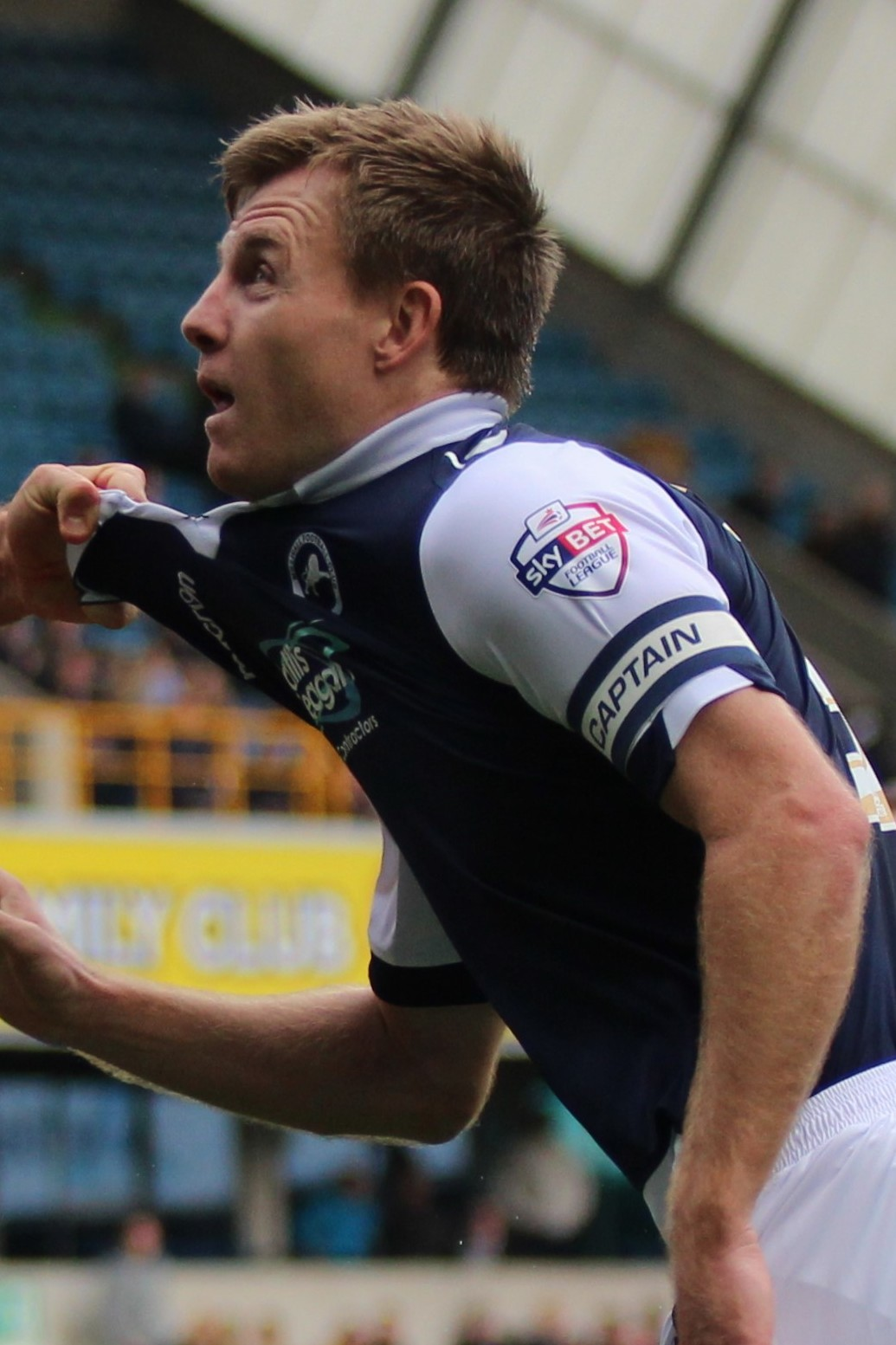
Central defender Tony Craig made 127 appearances between 2012 and 2015 and was voted the club's 2013–14 Players' Player of the Year.

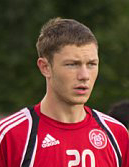
Until 2023, Danish right back Henrik Dalsgaard (who made 162 appearances between 2017 and 2021) was Brentford's most-capped international player.

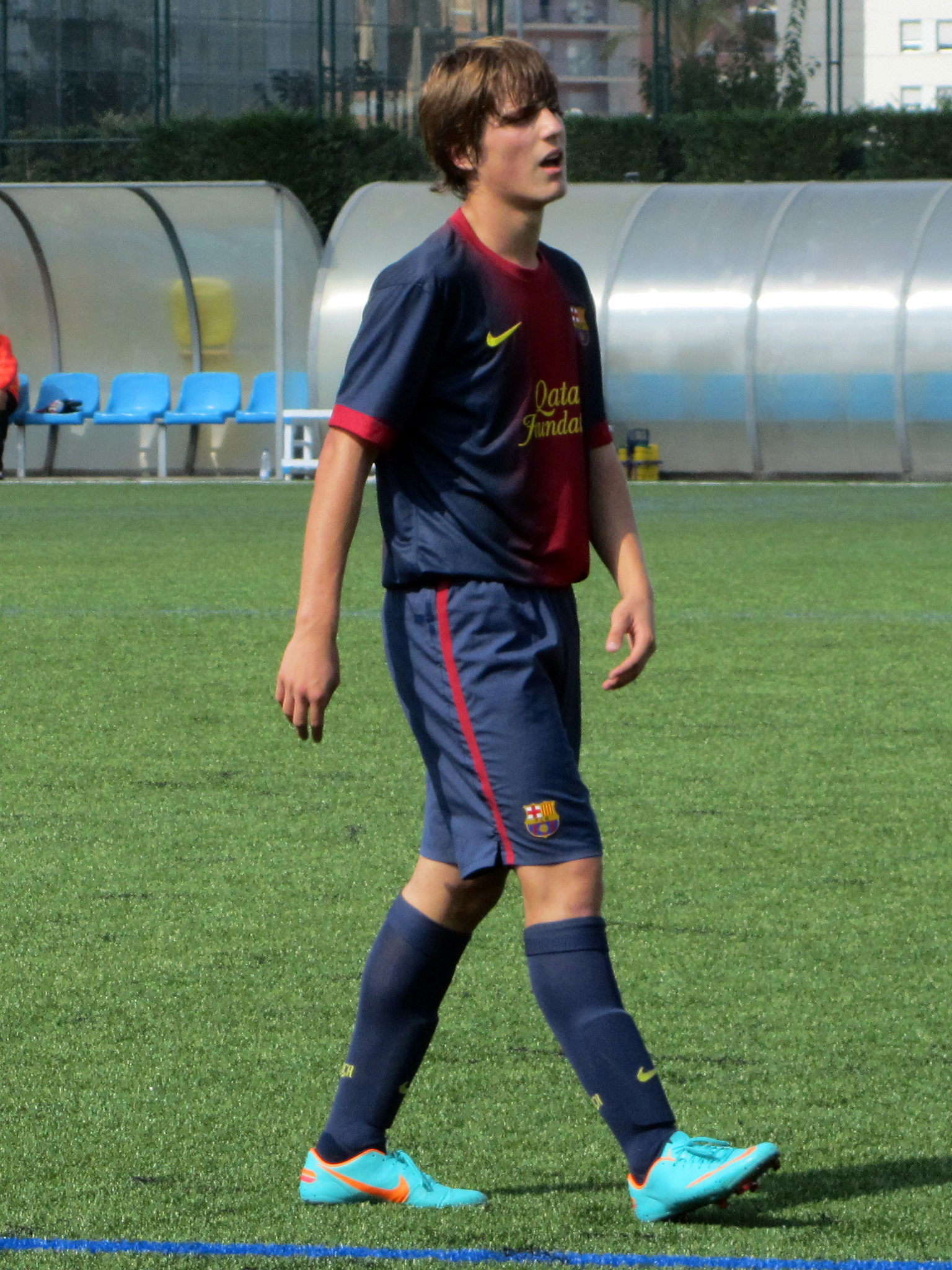
A cult hero winger, Spaniard Sergi Canós' 249 appearances was, until 2025, the most by a Brentford player born outside the British Isles.

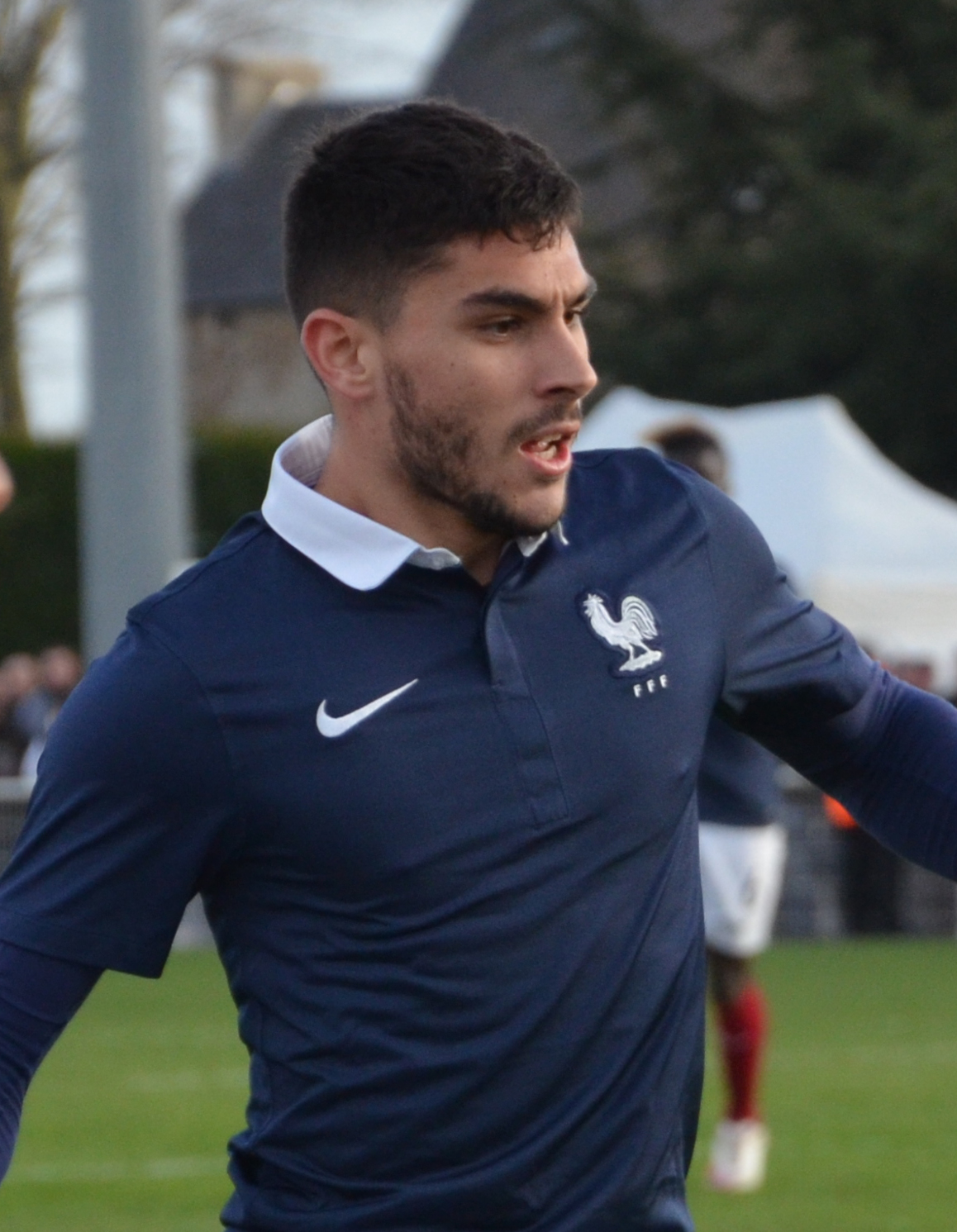
French forward Neal Maupay scored 41 goals in 95 appearances between 2017 and 2019. He returned to Brentford on loan in 2023 and made a further 34 appearances, scoring eight goals.

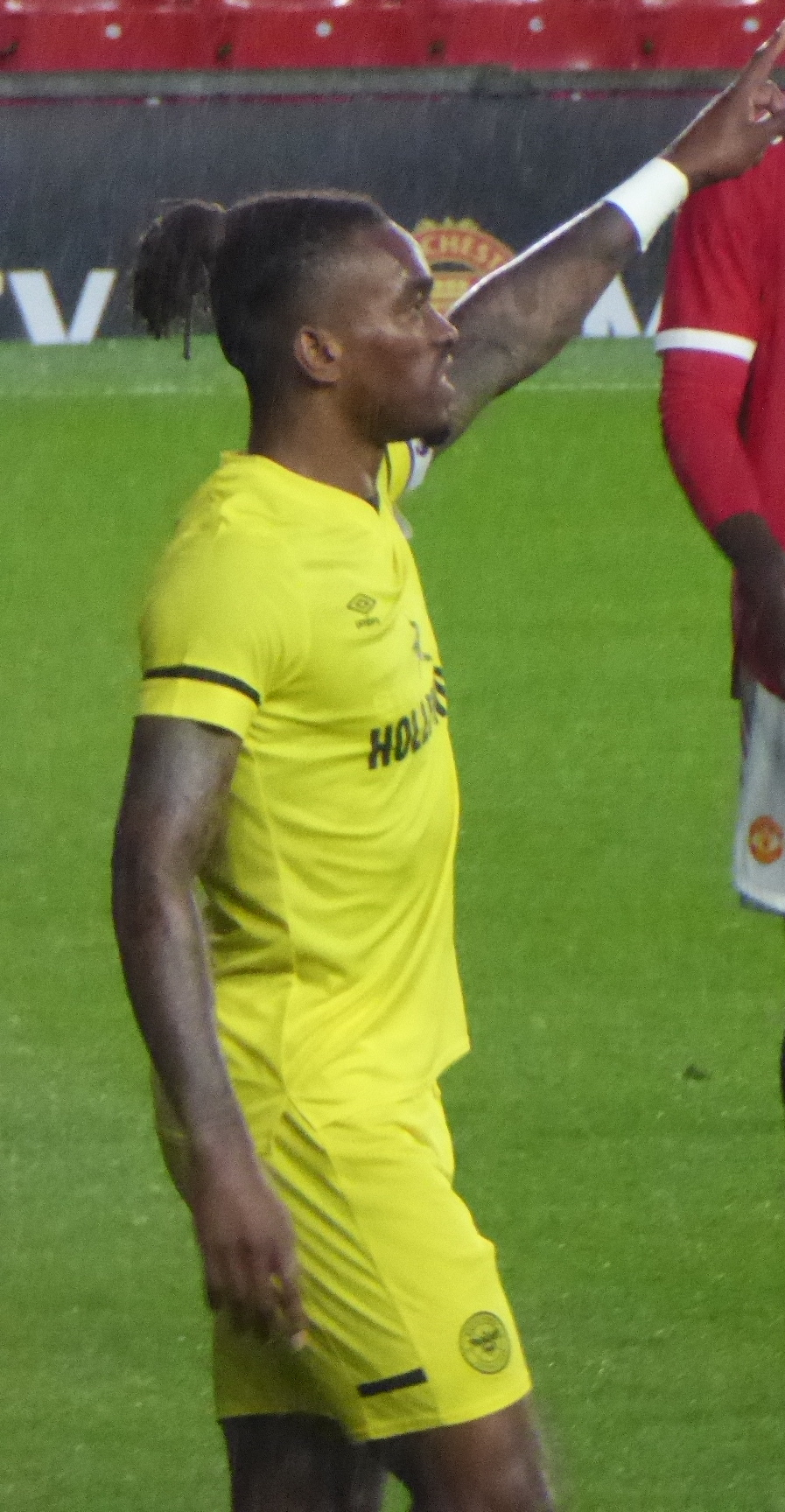
Forward Ivan Toney averaged more than a goal every other game during his Brentford career and was the club's first post-war player to be capped by England.

=== Southern League era (1898–1920) ===
Name	Nationality	Position	Brentford career	Appearances	Goals	Notes	Ref
Tommy Shanks	Ireland	FW	1901–1902; 1904–1906	109	27		
Tosher Underwood	England	OF	1902–1908	196	23	(Note: Member of the Brentford Hall of Fame.)	
Jimmy Jay	England	WH	1903–1910	225	5		
George Parsonage ♦ (c)	England	HB	1903–1908	194	12		
Jock Watson	Scotland	FB	1903–1908	186	0		
Jimmy Tomlinson	England	HB/FW	1904–1908	107	2		
Fred Corbett	England	FW	1905–1908	102	37		
Jock Hamilton	Scotland	HB	1907–1908; 1909–1912	119	1	(Note: Returned on loan from Leeds City in November 1908.)	
Steve Buxton	England	FB/FW	1908–1911	106	4	(Note: Represented the London XI.)	
Patsy Hendren	England	OL	1908; 1911–1927	309	45	(Note: Hendren played when his cricket commitments allowed.) (Note: Represented the Southern League XI.)	
Geordie Reid	Scotland	IL/CF	1908–1911	105	59		
Phil Richards	England	LH	1908–1913	151	1		
Dusty Rhodes ♦ (c)	England	FB	1908–1915	221	2		
Archie Ling	England	GK	1909–1912	118	2		
Alec Barclay	England	HB	1910–1915	105	5	(Note: Capped by England at amateur level.)	
Walter Spratt	England	FB	1911–1915; 1920–1921	123	1		
Ted Price	England	GK	1912–1920	118	0		
Alf Amos	England	WH	1914–1922	139	5		
Bertie Rosier	England	FB	1915–1923	127	0		

=== Interwar era (1920–1945) ===
Name	Nationality	Position	Brentford career	Appearances	Goals	Notes
William Young	England	GK	1920–1925	180	0	
Charles Alton	England	FB	1921–1925	133	6	
Freddy Capper	England	OF	1921–1924	106	6	
Reginald Parker	England	FW	1922–1925	104	35	
Alfred Douglas	England	OF	1925–1929	109	21	
Jack Lane (c)	England	IF	1925–1931	234	86	
Bill Berry	England	FW	1926–1932	148	43	
Ernie Watkins	England	FW	1926–1929	130	59	
William Hodge	Scotland	FB	1927–1934	125	1	
Alexander Stevenson	Scotland	RB	1927–1933	134	0	
Jimmy Bain ♦ (c)	Scotland	FB	1928–1933	201	2	
Reginald Davies	England	WH	1928–1931	123	0	
Teddy Ware	England	WH	1928–1933	102	0	
Tom Adamson	Scotland	FB	1929–1933	153	0	
Jackie Foster	England	OR	1929–1933	153	21	
Billy Lane	England	CF	1929–1932	123	89	
Jackie Burns	England	LH	1931–1935	152	16	
Joe James (c)	England	CH	1931–1939	255	2	
George Robson	England	IR	1931–1935	131	34	
Jack Holliday	England	CF	1932–1939	222	121	
Idris Hopkins	Wales	OR	1932–1947	314	80	
Duncan McKenzie	Scotland	WH	1932–1938	160	10	
Billy Scott	England	IF	1932–1947	296	86	
Herbert Watson (c)	England	RH	1932–1936	109	1	
Charlie Fletcher	England	OF	1933–1936	106	25	
Arthur Bateman (c)	England	FB	1934–1938	153	1	
Jimmy Mathieson	Scotland	GK	1934–1938	130	0	
George Poyser	England	LB	1934–1946	158	0	
David McCulloch	Scotland	CF	1935–1938	124	90	
Bobby Reid	Scotland	OL	1936–1939	109	37	
Buster Brown	England	U	1937–1947	106	2	
Joe Crozier	Scotland	GK	1937–1949	223	0	
Bill Gorman	Ireland; Republic of Ireland	FB	1938–1949	144	0	

=== Post-war era (1945–2000) ===
Name	Nationality	Position	Brentford career	Appearances	Goals	Notes
Tom Manley (c)	England	WH	1946–1950	125	0	
Roddy Munro	Scotland	FB	1946–1953	210	0	
Wally Bragg	England	CH	1947–1957	168	6	
Frank Latimer	England	U	1947–1956	185	3	
David Nelson	Scotland	WH	1947–1950	113	5	
Tony Harper	England	WH	1948–1955	188	7	
Fred Monk	England	RB/FW	1948–1954	219	49	
Ken Coote ♠ (c)	England	FB	1949–1963	559 ♠	15	
Billy Dare	England	CF	1949–1955	222	68	
Ron Greenwood	England	CH	1949–1952	147	1	(Note: Capped by England B.)
Jackie Goodwin	England	FW	1949–1954	138	22	
Alf Jefferies	England	GK	1949–1953	121	0	
Billy Sperrin	England	IF	1949–1955	100	30	
George Bristow	England	WH	1950–1961	264	8	
Ken Horne	England	WH/FB	1950–1960	239	1	
Ian Dargie	England	CH/IR	1952–1962	281	2	
Johnny Rainford	England	IF	1953–1962	324	49	(Note: Represented the Third Division South.)
Gerry Cakebread	England	GK	1954–1964	374	0	
Dennis Heath	England	OR	1954–1960	134	20	
Jim Towers ♠	England	FW	1954–1961	282	163 ♠	
George Francis	England	CF	1955–1961; 1961–1962	280	136	(Note: Francis briefly transferred to Queens Park Rangers between his two spells.)
Billy Goundry	England	WH	1955–1961	148	12	
Eric Parsons	England	OF	1956–1960	126	18	
Tom Wilson (c)	England	FB	1957–1962	156	0	
George McLeod	Scotland	OF	1958–1963	230	22	
John Docherty ♦	Scotland	OR	1960–1961; 1966–1968; 1970–1974	252	79	
Tommy Higginson	Scotland	WH	1960–1970	435	16	
Peter Gelson	England	CB/WH	1961–1974	516	18	
Micky Block	England	OR	1962–1966	163	33	
Alan Hawley (c)	England	RB	1962–1974	345	4	
Chic Brodie	Scotland	GK	1963–1971	224	0	
Allan Jones	Wales	FB	1963–1970	281	3	
Gordon Phillips	England	GK	1963–1973	227	0	
Mel Scott (c)	England	WH	1963–1966	177	2	
George Thomson	Scotland	WH	1963–1968	179	5	
Ian Lawther	Northern Ireland	CF	1964–1968	153	44	
Bobby Ross (c)	Scotland	IF	1966–1972	323	63	
Alan Nelmes	England	CB	1967–1976	350	2	
Allan Mansley	England	OF	1968–1971	105	30	
Gordon Neilson	Scotland	OF	1968–1972	104	15	
Dick Renwick	England	FB	1969–1971	106	5	
Paul Bence (c)	England	MF	1970–1977	268	6	
Roger Cross	England	FW	1970–1971; 1973–1977	228	61	
Jackie Graham (c)	Scotland	MF	1970–1980	409	40	
Brian Turner	New Zealand	MF	1970–1972	101	7	
Michael Allen	England	FB	1971–1978	255	13	
Terry Scales	England	DF	1971–1977	234	6	
Paul Priddy	England	GK	1972–1974; 1975–1977; 1981	130	0	
Gordon Riddick (c)	England	MF	1973–1976; 1976–1977	120	5	(Note: Retired in September 1976 and rejoined the club in October 1976.)
Terry Johnson	England	FW	1974–1977	112	30	
Danis Salman	England	DF	1975–1985	371	8	(Note: Capped by England at U18 level.)
Dave Carlton	England	MF	1976–1980	148	7	
John Fraser	England	FB	1976–1980	131	7	
Andrew McCulloch	England	FW	1976–1979	122	49	
Paul Shrubb (c)	England	MF/DF	1976–1982	198	8	
Len Bond	England	GK	1977–1980	130	0	
Pat Kruse	England	CB	1977–1982	201	12	
Steve Phillips	England	IF	1977–1980	167	69	
Neil Smillie	England	W	1977; 1988–1993	225	22	(Note: Joined on loan from Crystal Palace in January 1977 and returned to sign permanently in August 1988.)
Bob Booker	England	MF	1978–1988; 1991–1993	322	48	
Jim McNichol	Scotland	DF	1978–1984	169	23	(Note: Capped by Scotland at U21 level.)
Barry Tucker	Wales	FB	1978–1982	171	5	
Terry Hurlock (c)	England	CM	1980–1986	265	24	
Gary Roberts	Wales	W	1980–1986	226	64	(Note: Capped by Wales at U21 level.)
Chris Kamara (c)	England	MF	1981–1985	189	32	
Alan Whitehead	England	CB	1981–1984	126	4	
Francis Joseph	England	FW	1982–1987	138	56	
Keith Cassells	England	FW	1983–1985	102	35	
Keith Millen	England	CB	1984–1994	380	20	
Jamie Murray	Scotland	LB	1984–1987	156	4	
Gary Phillips	England	GK	1984–1988	171	0	
Robbie Cooke	England	FW	1985–1987	150	64	
Terry Evans (c)	England	CB	1985–1993	285	30	
Roger Joseph	England	RB	1985–1988	120	2	
Andy Sinton	England	LM	1985–1989	182	34	
Jamie Bates (c)	England	CB/FB	1986–1999	526	24	
Gary Blissett	England	FW	1987–1993	291	105	
Keith Jones (c)	England	MF	1987–1991	213	20	
Roger Stanislaus	England	LB	1987–1990	135	5	
Richard Cadette	England	FW	1988–1992	123	31	
Allan Cockram	England	CM	1988–1991	118	17	
Marcus Gayle	Jamaica	LW/FW	1988–1994; 2005–2006	230	28	
Kevin Godfrey	England	RW/FW	1988–1993	191	26	
Dean Holdsworth	England	FW	1988; 1989–1992	145	76	(Note: Joined on loan from Watford in October 1988 and returned to sign permanently in September 1989.)
Simon Ratcliffe	England	MF	1989–1995	268	16	
Graham Benstead	England	GK	1990–1994; 1997	133	0	
Billy Manuel (c)	England	LB/MF	1991–1994	116	2	
Brian Statham	England	RB/MF	1992–1997	198	1	
Kevin Dearden	England	GK	1993–1999	262	0	
Martin Grainger	England	LB	1993–1996	124	16	
Lee Harvey	England	RM/RB	1993–1996	128	7	
Carl Hutchings	England	MF	1993–1998; 2000	214	10	(Note: Departed in July 1998 and returned on loan from Bristol City in February 2000.)
Denny Mundee	England	U	1993–1995	100	18	
Paul Smith	England	MF	1993–1997	198	17	
Barry Ashby	England	CB	1994–1997	153	5	
Nicky Forster ♦	England	FW	1994–1997; 2010–2011	162	48	(Note: Capped by England at U21 level.)
Robert Taylor	England	FW	1994–1998	217	73	
Ijah Anderson	England	FB	1995–2002	243	2	
David McGhee	England	MF	1995–1998	145	11	
Andy Scott ♦	England	FW	1997–2001	143	37	
Gavin Mahon	England	MF	1998–2002	166	8	
Lloyd Owusu	Ghana	FW	1998–2002; 2005–2007	250	87	
Darren Powell	England	CB	1998–2002; 2009	154	9	
Rob Quinn	Republic of Ireland	DF	1998–2001	132	5	
Martin Rowlands	Republic of Ireland	MF	1998–2003	186	23	(Note: Capped by Republic of Ireland at U21 level.)
Paul Evans (c)	Wales	MF	1999–2002	155	34	
Ívar Ingimarsson	Iceland	CB	1999–2002	135	11	
Scott Partridge	England	FW	1999–2001	111	23	

=== 21st century (2000–present) ===
Name	Nationality	Position	Brentford career	Appearances	Goals	Notes
Michael Dobson (c)	England	RB/CB	2000–2005	211	7	
Kevin O'Connor (c)	Republic of Ireland	U	2000–2014	501	44	
Stephen Hunt	Republic of Ireland	MF	2001–2005	160	29	
Eddie Hutchinson	England	MF	2001–2006	136	9	
Paul Smith	England	GK	2001–2004	105	0	
Jay Tabb	Republic of Ireland	AM/LW	2001–2006	156	24	
Andy Frampton	England	CB/LB	2002–2007	164	7	
Stuart Nelson	England	GK	2004–2007	139	0	
Sam Sodje	Nigeria	CB	2004–2006	100	14	
Michael Turner	England	CB	2004–2006	110	3	(Note: Joined on loan from Charlton Athletic in August 2004 and transferred permanently in November 2004.)
Karleigh Osborne	England	CB/RB	2005–2012	185	6	
Ryan Dickson	England	LB	2007–2010	106	3	(Note: Joined on loan from Plymouth Argyle in November 2007 and transferred permanently in January 2008.)
Marcus Bean	Jamaica	DM	2008–2012	168	15	
Charlie MacDonald	England	FW	2008–2011	127	45	
Sam Wood	England	LW/LB	2008–2012	126	5	
Leon Legge	England	CB	2009–2012	115	10	
Sam Saunders	England	RM	2009–2016	206	30	
Myles Weston	Antigua and Barbuda	LW	2009–2012	129	14	
Toumani Diagouraga	France	DM	2010–2016	246	7	(Note: Joined on loan from Peterborough United in January 2010 and transferred permanently in July 2010.)
Jake Bidwell * (c)	England	LB	2011–2016	211	3	(Note: Joined on loan from Everton for separate spells in November 2011 and August 2012 and transferred permanently in June 2013.)
Harlee Dean (c)	England	CB	2011–2017	249	10	(Note: Joined on loan from Southampton in November 2011 and transferred permanently in May 2012.)
Clayton Donaldson	Jamaica	FW	2011–2014	155	53	
Jonathan Douglas	Republic of Ireland	DM	2011–2015	187	17	
Shay Logan	England	RB/RM	2011–2014	104	5	
Tony Craig	England	CB/LB	2012–2015	127	0	
Adam Forshaw *	England	CM	2012–2014	100	11	(Note: Joined on loan from Everton in February 2012 and transferred permanently in May 2012.)
David Button *	England	GK	2013–2016	141	0	
Alan McCormack	Republic of Ireland	RB/DM	2013–2017	104	3	
Alan Judge	Republic of Ireland	MF	2014–2019	140	26	(Note: Joined on loan from Blackburn Rovers in January 2014 and transferred permanently in June 2014.)
Nico Yennaris *	China	CM/RB	2014–2018	157	12	
Yoann Barbet *	France	CB	2015–2019	118	7	
Sergi Canós *	Spain	W/WB	2015–2016; 2017–2023	249	36	(Note: Joined on loan from Liverpool in August 2015 and returned to sign permanently in January 2017.)
Josh McEachran	England	CM	2015–2019	102	1	
Ryan Woods *	England	CM	2015–2018	128	3	
Dan Bentley *	England	GK	2016–2019	125	0	
Romaine Sawyers (c)	Saint Kitts and Nevis	AM	2016–2019	135	8	
Henrik Dalsgaard	Denmark	RB	2017–2021	162	7	
Rico Henry ‡	Jamaica	LB	2017–	242	5	(Note: Capped by England at U20 level.)
Neal Maupay *	France	FW	2017–2019; 2023–2024	126	49	(Note: Joined on loan from Everton in September 2023.)
Kamohelo Mokotjo *	South Africa	DM	2017–2020	102	6	
Ollie Watkins *	England	FW/W	2017–2020	143	49	
Josh Dasilva ‡	England	AM	2018–	159	22	
Pontus Jansson * (c)	Sweden	CB	2019–2023	115	4	
Mathias Jensen ‡	Denmark	MF	2019–	276	17	
Bryan Mbeumo *	Cameroon	W/FW	2019–2025	242	70	(Note: Capped by France at U21 level.)
Christian Nørgaard * (c)	Denmark	DM	2019–2025	198	13	
Ethan Pinnock *	Jamaica	CB	2019–2026	216	12	
David Raya *	Spain	GK	2019–2023	161	0	
Mads Roerslev *	Denmark	RB	2019–2025	146	2	(Note: Capped by Denmark at U21 level.)
Saman Ghoddos *	Iran	AM	2020–2024	108	6	(Note: Joined on loan from Amiens SC in September 2020 and transferred permanently in January 2021.) (Note: Ghoddos was released in June 2023 and rejoined the club on a one-year contract as a free agent in August 2023.)
Vitaly Janelt ‡	Germany	DM	2020–	232	16	(Note: Capped by Germany at U21 level.)
Ivan Toney *	England	FW	2020–2024	141	72	
Kristoffer Ajer ‡	Norway	CB/RB	2021–	131	3	
Yoane Wissa *	DR Congo	FW/LW	2021–2025	149	49	
Mikkel Damsgaard ‡	Denmark	MF	2022–	142	8	
Keane Lewis-Potter ‡	England	LW/LB	2022–	139	12	
Yehor Yarmolyuk ‡	Ukraine	CM	2022–	115	1	(Note: Capped by Ukraine at U23 level.)
Nathan Collins (c) ‡	Republic of Ireland	CB	2023–	129	8	
Kevin Schade ‡	Germany	LW/FW	2023–	120	25	(Note: Joined on loan from SC Freiburg in January 2023 and transferred permanently in June 2023.) (Note: Capped by Germany at U21 level.)

== Captains ==
Years	Name	Nationality	Position	Notes
1889–1892	J. J. K. Curtis	England	n/a	
1892–1894	Hinton Bailey	England	GK	(Note: Hinton had previously served as vice-captain.)
1894–1897	Arthur Charlton	Scotland	U	
1897–1898	Herbert Edney	England	HB	
1898–1899	Alfred Lugg	England	FB	
1899–1900	Richard Dailley	England	HB/FW	
1900–1901	Ralph McElhaney	Scotland	U	
1901–1902	Robert Stormont	Scotland	CF	
1902–1903	Ellis Green	England	HB	
1903–1904	Tommy Davidson	Scotland	FB	
1904–1908	George Parsonage ♦	England	HB	
1908–1910	Dusty Rhodes ♦	England	FB	
1910–1911	George Frost	England	FW	
1911–1919	Dusty Rhodes ♦	England	FB	
1919–1920	Patsy Hendren	England	OL	
1920–1921	Jimmy Hodson	England	FB	
1921–1922	Patsy Hendren	England	OL	
1922–1923	Bertie Rosier	England	FB	
1923–1924	Freddy Capper	England	OF	
1924–1926	Alex Graham	Scotland	CH	
1926–1927	Harry Rae	Scotland	DF	
1927–1928	Stephen Dearn	England	WH	
1928–1931	Reginald Davies	England	WH	
1931–1932	Jimmy Bain ♦	Scotland	FB	
1932–1936	Herbert Watson	England	RH	
1936–1937	Arthur Bateman	England	FB	(Note: Bateman had previously served as vice-captain during the 1934–35 season.)
1937–1939	Joe James	England	CB	
1939–1946	Tom Manley	England	WH	(Note: Due to Tom Manley's unavailability during much of the Second World War, the captaincy was held by other Brentford players, most notably Joe James and Billy Scott.)
1946–1948	George Paterson	Scotland	WH	
1948–1949	Jack Chisholm	England	CH	
1949–1950	Tom Manley	England	WH	
1950–1952	Ron Greenwood	England	CB	
1952–1953	Tommy Lawton	England	CF	
1953–1954	Fred Monk	England	RB/FW	
1954–1955	Frank Latimer	England	DF	
1955–1957	Sid Tickridge	England	FB	
1957–1960	Tom Wilson	England	FB	
1960–1964	Ken Coote	England	FB	
1964–1966	Mel Scott	England	CB	
1966	Peter Gelson	England	CB	
1966–1968	Bobby Ross	Scotland	IF	
1968–1970	Ron Fenton ♦	England	IF	
1970–1972	Bobby Ross	Scotland	IF	
1972–1973	Alan Hawley	England	RB	
1973–1975	Gordon Riddick	England	MF	
1975–1976	Paul Bence	England	MF	
1976–1980	Jackie Graham	Scotland	MF	
1980–1981	Ron Harris	England	RB/MF	
1981–1982	Terry Hurlock	England	CM	
1982–1983	Chris Kamara	England	MF	
1983–1984	Ian Bolton	England	CB	
1984–1986	Terry Hurlock	England	CM	
1986	Steve Wignall	England	CB	
1986–1988	Wayne Turner	England	MF	
1988–1991	Keith Jones	England	MF	
1991–1993	Terry Evans	England	CB	
1993–1994	Billy Manuel	England	LB/MF	
1994–1999	Jamie Bates	England	CB/FB	
1999–2002	Paul Evans	Wales	MF	
2002–2004	Michael Dobson	England	RB/CB	(Note: Dobson later served as club captain during the 2005–06 season.)
2004–2005	Stewart Talbot	England	DM	
2005–2006	Ricky Newman	England	CM	
2006–2007	Kevin O'Connor	Republic of Ireland	U	
2007–2008	John Mackie	England	CB	
2008	Matt Heywood	England	CB	
2008	Adam Newton	Saint Kitts and Nevis	MF	
2008–2015	Kevin O'Connor	Republic of Ireland	U	(Note: When unavailable, O'Connor was deputised as captain by Alan Bennett, Jonathan Douglas, Richard Lee and Tony Craig.)
2015–2016	Jake Bidwell *	England	LB	
2016–2017	Harlee Dean	England	CB	(Note: Dean had previously served as vice-captain during the 2015–16 season.)
2017–2018	John Egan *	Republic of Ireland	CB	
2018	Leadership group			(Note: Then-head coach Dean Smith opted against appointing a permanent captain, citing that "the job of a leader within the group is to help create other leaders and not followers. I think sometimes when you name that captain, he becomes that leader and people start to follow him, rather than become leaders themselves".)
2018–2019	Romaine Sawyers	Saint Kitts and Nevis	AM	
2019–2023	Pontus Jansson *	Sweden	CB	(Note: When unavailable, Jansson was deputised as captain by successive vice-captains Henrik Dalsgaard and Christian Nørgaard. Other leadership group members Ivan Toney and David Raya acted as third and fourth captains.)
2023–2025	Christian Nørgaard *	Denmark	DM	(Note: When unavailable, Nørgaard was deputised as captain by vice-captain Mathias Jensen. When Nørgaard and Jensen were unavailable, they were deputised by Vitaly Janelt.)
2025–	Nathan Collins ‡	Republic of Ireland	CB	
