= 1911–12 Brentford F.C. season =

English football team season

Brentford
1911–12 season
- Chairman: H. Jason-Saunders
- Secretary Manager: Fred Halliday
- Stadium: Griffin Park
- Southern League First Division: 14th
- FA Cup: First round
- Top goalscorer: League: Rippon (17); All: Rippon (20)
- Highest home attendance: 9,627
- Lowest home attendance: 1,475
Home colours

During the 1911–12 English football season, Brentford competed in the Southern League First Division. A forgettable season saw the club finish in mid-table and advance to the first round proper of the FA Cup.

== Season summary ==
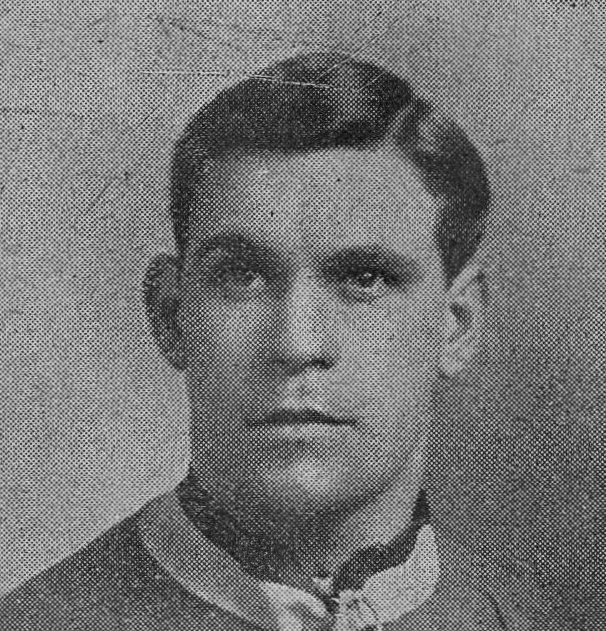
Cricketing-outside left Patsy Hendren returned to Brentford in 1911 and would remain until his retirement in 1927.

Brentford secretary-manager Fred Halliday strengthened his squad in preparation for the 1911–12 Southern League First Division season, bringing in left back Walter Spratt, outside right Billy Brawn, inside forward Patsy Hendren and centre forward Thomas Graham. He would later sign forwards Fred Rouse and Willis Rippon in a bid to improve the team's goalscoring, with Rippon going on to finish the season as top-scorer with 20 goals. Full back Steve Buxton was sold to Oldham Athletic on the eve of the season for a £425 fee, in a bid to settle some of the club's debts. The sale of Geordie Reid to Clyde for a club record £500 fee in September 1911 helped pay off further debts.

Brentford finished the season in 14th place and advanced to the first round proper of the FA Cup, taking Crystal Palace to a replay before going out of the competition. The 9–0 league defeat to Coventry City on 27 December 1911 is the heaviest in club history.

== League table ==
Pos	Team	Pld	W	D	L	GF	GA	GR	Pts
12	Norwich City	38	10	14	14	40	60	0.667	34
13	West Ham United	38	13	7	18	64	69	0.928	33
14	Brentford	38	12	9	17	60	65	0.923	33
15	Exeter City	38	11	11	16	48	62	0.774	33
16	Southampton	38	10	11	17	46	63	0.730	31

Source: rsssf.com
Rules for classification: The system of using goal average to separate two teams tied on points was used until the 1976–77 season. The points system: 2 points for a win, 1 point for a draw and 0 points for losing.

== Results ==
Brentford's goal tally listed first.

=== Legend ===
Win	Draw	Loss

=== Southern League First Division ===
No.	Date	Opponent	Venue	Result	Attendance	Scorer(s)
1	2 September 1911	Reading	A	0–0	7,000	
2	6 September 1911	Brighton & Hove Albion	A	2–0	n/a	Sibbald (2)
3	9 September 1911	Watford	H	4–2	7,344	Reid (3), Graham
4	16 September 1911	New Brompton	A	1–2	5,000	Sibbald
5	23 September 1911	Exeter City	H	3–1	7,400	Hendren (2), Sibbald
6	30 September 1911	Luton Town	H	0–1	5,700	
7	7 October 1911	Queens Park Rangers	A	0–4	14,000	
8	14 October 1911	Millwall	H	3–3	7,000	Graham, Brawn, Hendren
9	21 October 1911	West Ham United	A	4–7	6,000	Rippon (3), Hendren
10	28 October 1911	Bristol Rovers	H	2–2	5,000	Brawn, Rippon
11	4 November 1911	Swindon Town	A	0–2	n/a	
12	11 November 1911	Northampton Town	H	2–2	5,000	
13	25 November 1911	Stoke	H	0–1	n/a	
14	9 December 1911	Leyton	H	2–0	n/a	Rippon, Rouse
15	16 December 1911	Norwich City	A	0–2	5,000	
16	23 December 1911	Crystal Palace	H	1–0	5,000	Sibbald
17	25 December 1911	Southampton	H	4–0	9,627	Graham (2), Sibbald (2)
18	26 December 1911	Southampton	A	2–3	6,000	Rouse, Sibbald
19	27 December 1911	Coventry City	A	0–9	n/a	
20	30 December 1911	Reading	H	0–0	4,000	
21	6 January 1912	Watford	A	0–3	n/a	
22	20 January 1912	New Brompton	H	7–1	3,000	Rippon (3), Rouse (2), Hendren (2)
23	27 January 1912	Exeter City	A	0–1	5,000	
24	3 February 1912	Luton Town	A	0–0	n/a	
25	10 February 1912	Queens Park Rangers	H	1–2	9,450	Rouse
26	17 February 1912	Millwall	A	0–2	n/a	
27	2 March 1912	Bristol Rovers	A	3–1	4,000	McTavish, Rippon (2)
28	16 March 1912	Northampton Town	A	3–6	5,000	McTavish, Rippon (2)
29	23 March 1912	Brighton & Hove Albion	H	1–1	2,503	Sibbald
30	27 March 1912	West Ham United	H	1–2	3,000	Sibbald
31	30 March 1912	Stoke	A	1–1	6,000	Sibbald
32	5 April 1912	Plymouth Argyle	H	4–0	8,795	Sibbald, Rippon (2), McTavish
33	6 April 1912	Coventry City	H	3–0	5,453	Brawn (2), McTavish
34	8 April 1912	Plymouth Argyle	A	0–1	3,000	
35	13 April 1912	Leyton	A	1–1	2,000	McTavish
36	20 April 1912	Norwich City	H	3–0	4,000	McTavish, Wolstenholme (og), Rippon
37	24 April 1912	Swindon Town	H	2–0	n/a	Rippon (2, 1 pen)
38	27 April 1912	Crystal Palace	A	0–2	4,000	

=== FA Cup ===
Round	Date	Opponent	Venue	Result	Attendance	Scorer(s)	Notes
QR5	18 November 1911	First Battalion King's Royal Rifles	H	1–1	1,475	Hendren	
QR5 (replay)	22 November 1911	First Battalion King's Royal Rifles	A	4–1	2,600	Hendren, Rippon (3)	(Note: Match played at Griffin Park due to the inadequacy of First Battalion King's Royal Rifles' ground.)
QR6	2 December 1911	Southend United	A	1–0	3,500	Brawn	
R1	13 January 1912	Crystal Palace	H	0–0	8,916		
R1 (replay)	17 January 1912	Crystal Palace	A	0–4	9,000		

- Source: 100 Years Of Brentford

== Playing squad ==
Players' ages are as of the opening day of the 1911–12 season.

Pos.	Name	Nat.	Date of birth (age)	Signed from	Signed in	Notes
Goalkeepers
GK	Archie Ling	(England)	14 March 1881 (aged 30)	Swindon Town	1909	
Defenders
DF	Arthur Cleverley	(England)	28 March 1885 (aged 26)	Yiewsley	1910	
DF	Dusty Rhodes (c)	(England)	16 August 1882 (aged 29)	Sunderland	1908	
DF	Walter Spratt	(England)	14 April 1889 (aged 22)	Rotherham Town	1911	
Midfielders
HB	Walter Allen	(England)	28 September 1889 (aged 21)	Barnet & Alston	1911	Amateur
HB	Alec Barclay	(England)	1 November 1885 (aged 25)	Ilford	1910	Amateur
HB	Jock Hamilton	(Scotland)	28 February 1879 (aged 32)	Leeds City	1909	
HB	William Hickleton	(England)	12 May 1882 (aged 29)	Coventry City	1911	On loan from Coventry City
HB	George Kennedy	(Scotland)	12 March 1882 (aged 29)	Chelsea	1910	
HB	Phil Richards	(England)	19 February 1884 (aged 27)	Bradford Park Avenue	1908	
Forwards
FW	George Anderson	(England)	29 November 1879 (aged 31)	Birmingham	1909	
FW	Billy Brawn	(England)	1 August 1878 (aged 33)	Chelsea	1911	
FW	Willie Furr	(England)	22 July 1891 (aged 20)	Hitchin Town	1912	
FW	Thomas Graham	(England)	20 July 1887 (aged 24)	Castleford Town	1911	
FW	Patsy Hendren	(England)	5 February 1889 (aged 22)	Coventry City	1911	Played when his cricket commitments allowed
FW	Henry Purver	(England)	3 May 1891 (aged 20)	Oxford City	1911	Amateur
FW	Willis Rippon	(England)	2 December 1888 (aged 22)	Woolwich Arsenal	1911	
FW	Jack Sibbald	(England)	12 September 1890 (aged 20)	Wallsend Elm Villa	1910	
FW	Charles Symes	(England)	13 March 1888 (aged 23)	South Tooting	1912	
FW	Bob McTavish	(Scotland)	26 October 1888 (aged 22)	Tottenham Hotspur	1912	
Players who left the club mid-season
GK	Harry Furr	(England)	13 January 1887 (aged 24)	Croydon Common	1911	Transferred to Croydon Common
FW	Geordie Reid	(Scotland)	30 January 1882 (aged 29)	Bradford Park Avenue	1908	Transferred to Clyde
FW	Fred Rouse	(England)	28 November 1881 (aged 29)	Croydon Common	1911	Retired

- Source: Brentford Football Club Official Handbook 1911–12, 100 Years Of Brentford, Football League Players' Records 1888 to 1939

== Coaching staff ==
Name	Role
(England) Fred Halliday	Secretary Manager
(England) Tom Cowper	Trainer

== Statistics ==
=== Appearances and goals ===

Brentford's highest appearance-makers in each position during the Southern League season.

Pos	Nat	Name	League		FA Cup		Total	
Pos	Nat	Name	Apps	Goals	Apps	Goals	Apps	Goals
GK	(England)	Harry Furr	6	0	2	0	8	0
GK	(England)	Archie Ling	32	0	3	0	35	0
DF	(England)	Arthur Cleverley	14	0	0	0	14	0
DF	(England)	Dusty Rhodes	29	0	5	0	34	0
DF	(England)	Walter Spratt	31	0	5	0	36	0
HB	(England)	Walter Allen	2	0	0	0	2	0
HB	(England)	Alec Barclay	28	0	3	0	31	0
HB	(Scotland)	Jock Hamilton	22	0	5	0	27	0
HB	(Scotland)	George Kennedy	28	0	4	0	32	0
HB	(England)	Phil Richards	12	0	3	0	15	0
FW	(England)	George Anderson	20	1	3	0	23	1
FW	(England)	Billy Brawn	34	4	5	1	39	5
FW	(England)	Willie Furr	2	0	0	0	2	0
FW	(England)	Thomas Graham	15	4	1	0	16	4
FW	(England)	Patsy Hendren	32	4	5	2	37	6
FW	(Scotland)	Bob McTavish	12	6	—		12	6
FW	(England)	Henry Purver	2	0	0	0	2	0
FW	(Scotland)	Geordie Reid	4	3	—		4	3
FW	(England)	Willis Rippon	24	17	5	3	29	20
FW	(England)	Fred Rouse	15	5	2	0	17	5
FW	(England)	Jack Sibbald	29	12	4	0	33	12
FW	(England)	Charles Symes	1	0	—		1	0
Players loaned in during the season
HB	(England)	William Hickleton	24	1	0	0	24	1

- Players listed in italics left the club mid-season.
- Source: 100 Years Of Brentford

=== Goalscorers ===
Pos.	Nat	Player	SL1	FAC	Total
FW	(England)	Willis Rippon	17	3	20
FW	(England)	Jack Sibbald	12	0	12
FW	(Scotland)	Bob McTavish	6	—	6
FW	(England)	Patsy Hendren	4	2	6
FW	(England)	Fred Rouse	5	0	5
FW	(England)	Billy Brawn	4	1	5
FW	(England)	Thomas Graham	4	0	4
FW	(Scotland)	Geordie Reid	3	—	3
FW	(England)	George Anderson	1	0	1
HB	(England)	William Hickleton	1	0	1
Opponents			1	0	1
Total			60	6	66

- Players listed in italics left the club mid-season.
- Source: 100 Years Of Brentford

=== Management ===
Name	Nat	From	To	Record All Comps					Record League				
Name	Nat	From	To	P	W	D	L	W %	P	W	D	L	W %
Fred Halliday	(England)	2 September 1911	27 April 1912	43	14	11	18	32.56|	38	12	9	17	31.58

=== Summary ===
Games played	47 (42 Southern League First Division, 5 FA Cup)
Games won	14 (12 Southern League First Division, 2 FA Cup)
Games drawn	11 (9 Southern League First Division, 2 FA Cup)
Games lost	18 (17 Southern League First Division, 1 FA Cup)
Goals scored	66 (60 Southern League First Division, 6 FA Cup)
Goals conceded	71 (65 Southern League First Division, 6 FA Cup)
Clean sheets	13 (11 Southern League First Division, 2 FA Cup)
Biggest league win	7–1 versus New Brompton, 20 January 1912
Worst league defeat	9–0 versus Coventry City, 27 December 1911
Most appearances	39, Billy Brawn (34 Southern League First Division, 5 FA Cup)
Top scorer (league)	17, Willis Rippon
Top scorer (all competitions)	20, Willis Rippon

== Transfers & loans ==
Cricketers are not included in this list.

Players transferred in
Date	Pos.	Name	Previous club	Fee	Ref.
5 May 1911	FW	(England) Thomas Graham	(England) Castleford Town	n/a	
5 May 1911	DF	(England) Walter Spratt	(England) Rotherham Town	Free	
19 May 1911	FW	(England) Billy Brawn	(England) Chelsea	n/a	
19 August 1911	FW	(England) Patsy Hendren	(England) Coventry City	n/a	
August 1911	GK	J. Blackburn	(England) Tottenham Thursday	Amateur	
August 1911	FW	(England) Henry Purver	(England) Oxford City	Amateur	
22 September 1911	FW	(England) Fred Rouse	(England) Chelsea	n/a	
21 October 1911	FW	(England) Willis Rippon	(England) Woolwich Arsenal	£200	
28 October 1911	GK	(England) Harry Furr	(England) Croydon Common	n/a	
1911	HB	(England) Walter Allen	(England) Barnet & Alston	Amateur	
1911	HB	(England) Joseph Raw	n/a	n/a	
1911	HB	(England) Thomas Wicks	n/a	n/a	
February 1912	FW	(England) Willie Furr	(England) Hitchin Town	n/a	
2 March 1912	FW	(Scotland) Bob McTavish	(England) Tottenham Hotspur	Nominal	
1912	FW	(England) Charles Symes	(England) South Tooting	n/a	
Players loaned in
Date	Pos.	Name	Subsequent club	Date to	Ref.
26 August 1911	HB	(England) William Hickleton	(England) Coventry City	End of season	
Players transferred out
Date	Pos.	Name	Subsequent club	Fee	Ref.
5 August 1911	DF	(England) Steve Buxton	(England) Oldham Athletic	£425	
22 September 1911	FW	(Scotland) Geordie Reid	(Scotland) Clyde	£500	
March 1912	GK	(England) Harry Furr	(England) Croydon Common	n/a	
Players released
Date	Pos.	Name	Subsequent club	Join date	Ref.
February 1912	FW	(England) Fred Rouse	Retired		
May 1912	HB	(England) Walter Allen	Barnet & Alston	n/a	
May 1912	FW	(England) George Anderson	Retired		
May 1912	GK	(England) Archie Ling	Retired		
