= 1909–10 Brentford F.C. season =

English football team season

Brentford
1909–10 season
- Chairman: H. Jason-Saunders
- Secretary Manager: Fred Halliday
- Stadium: Griffin Park
- Southern League First Division: 14th
- FA Cup: Second round
- Top goalscorer: League: Reid (17); All: Reid (19)
Home colours

During the 1909–10 English football season, Brentford competed in the Southern League First Division. A mid-table season ended on a positive note, with a run of just three defeats from the final 17 matches.

== Season summary ==
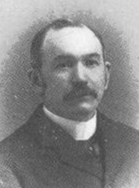
H. Jason-Saunders was appointed chairman in 1909 and held the position until 1922, by which time Brentford was a member of the Football League.

Brentford manager Fred Halliday assembled a small squad for the 1909–10 season, with the club having withdrawn from the Western League and United League in favour of concentrating solely on the Southern League. A handful of the previous season's squad was retained and in came a number of new players, including goalkeeper Archie Ling and former Brentford pair Jock Hamilton and Adam Bowman. The club adopted new colours prior to the season, with the gold and blue-striped shirts being replaced by a gold shirt with a blue 'V' on the front and back.

Injury to captain Dusty Rhodes, illness suffered by Jock Hamilton and poor form from forward George Rushton contributed to Brentford's bad start to the First Division season. Manager Halliday was forced to play natural centre forward Adam Bowman at inside forward, which conflicted with centre forward Geordie Reid's role and necessitated the transfer swap of Bowman for Portsmouth inside forward Bill McCafferty in October 1909. After exiting the FA Cup in the second round at the hands of Accrington Stanley, Brentford emerged from a poor Christmas and January to win 10 and draw four of the final 17 matches of the season. The Bees finished comfortably in 14th position.

== League table ==
Pos	Team	Pld	W	D	L	GF	GA	GR	Pts
12	New Brompton	42	19	5	18	76	74	1.027	43
13	Bristol Rovers	42	16	10	16	37	48	0.771	42
14	Brentford	42	16	9	17	50	58	0.862	41
15	Luton Town	42	15	11	16	72	92	0.783	41
16	Millwall	42	15	7	20	45	59	0.763	37

Rules for classification: The system of using goal average to separate two teams tied on points was used until the 1976-77 season. The points system: 2 points for a win, 1 point for a draw and 0 points for losing.

== Results ==
Brentford's goal tally listed first.

=== Legend ===
Win	Draw	Loss

=== Southern League First Division ===
No.	Date	Opponent	Venue	Result	Scorer(s)
1	1 September 1909	Crystal Palace	A	0–1	
2	4 September 1909	Brighton & Hove Albion	H	0–0	
3	8 September 1909	Swindon Town	A	0–4	
4	11 September 1909	West Ham United	A	2–3	Rushton, Reid
5	13 September 1909	Crystal Palace	H	1–0	Richards
6	18 September 1909	Portsmouth	H	2–0	Bowman (2)
7	25 September 1909	Bristol Rovers	A	0–3	
8	27 September 1909	Swindon Town	H	1–1	Bowman (2)
9	2 October 1909	Norwich City	H	0–1	
10	9 October 1909	Exeter City	A	1–4	Reid
11	11 October 1909	Plymouth Argyle	H	2–2	Riley, Bowman
12	16 October 1909	Coventry City	A	0–3	
13	23 October 1909	Watford	H	2–0	Reid (2, 1 pen)
14	30 October 1909	Reading	A	0–2	
15	6 November 1909	Southend United	H	4–1	Bartlett, Hollinrake, Reid (2)
16	13 November 1909	Leyton	A	0–0	
17	27 November 1909	Southampton	A	0–1	
18	11 December 1909	Millwall	A	1–1	Reid
19	18 December 1909	New Brompton	H	4–1	Reid (3), Rhodes (pen)
20	25 December 1909	Northampton Town	H	2–1	Walker, Bartlett
21	27 December 1909	Northampton Town	A	1–4	Rushton (pen)
22	28 December 1909	Luton Town	A	2–4	Rhodes (pen), Bartlett
23	1 January 1910	Queens Park Rangers	H	0–1	
24	8 January 1910	Brighton & Hove Albion	A	0–3	
25	15 January 1910	Croydon Common	H	1–2	McCafferty
26	22 January 1910	West Ham United	H	0–0	
27	29 January 1910	Portsmouth	A	2–0	McCafferty, Reid
28	5 February 1910	Croydon Common	A	2–1	Hollinrake, Bartlett
29	12 February 1910	Norwich City	A	1–5	Hollinrake
30	14 February 1910	Bristol Rovers	H	1–0	Walker
31	19 February 1910	Exeter City	H	3–0	Anderson, Hollinrake, Reid
32	26 February 1910	Coventry City	H	3–1	Hollinrake (2), Bartlett
33	5 March 1910	Watford	A	0–0	
34	12 March 1910	Reading	H	1–0	Reid
35	19 March 1910	Southend United	A	3–0	Walker, Hollinrake, Anderson
36	25 March 1910	Queens Park Rangers	A	0–0	
37	26 March 1910	Leyton	H	1–0	Hollinrake
38	28 March 1910	Luton Town	H	2–2	Sibbald, Anderson
39	2 April 1910	Plymouth Argyle	A	0–3	
40	9 April 1910	Southampton	H	1–0	Reid
41	23 April 1910	Millwall	H	2–0	Reid, McCafferty
42	30 April 1910	New Brompton	A	2–3	Reid (2)

=== FA Cup ===
Round	Date	Opponent	Venue	Result	Scorer
1R	20 November 1909	Luton Town	H	2–1	Reid (2)
2R	4 December 1909	Accrington Stanley	A	0–1	

- Source: 100 Years of Brentford

== Playing squad ==
Note: Flags indicate national team as defined under FIFA eligibility rules; some limited exceptions apply. Players may hold more than one non-FIFA nationality.

Pos.	Nation	Player
GK	ENG	Archie Ling
GK	ENG	Albert Wise
DF	ENG	Steve Buxton
DF	ENG	Dusty Rhodes (c)
DF	ENG	Tommy Stewart
MF	ENG	Charlie Blackall
MF	SCO	Jock Hamilton
MF	ENG	Jimmy Jay
MF	ENG	Phil Richards
MF	ENG	James Riley

Pos.	Nation	Player
FW	ENG	George Anderson
FW	ENG	Albert Bartlett
FW	ENG	Arthur Cowley
FW	SCO	Billy Grassam
FW	ENG	Bert Hollinrake
FW	SCO	Bill McCafferty
FW	ENG	James McDonald
FW	SCO	Geordie Reid
FW	ENG	Jack Sibbald
FW	ENG	Lindsay Syrad

=== Left club during season ===
Note: Flags indicate national team as defined under FIFA eligibility rules; some limited exceptions apply. Players may hold more than one non-FIFA nationality.

Pos.	Nation	Player
FW	SCO	Adam Bowman (to Portsmouth)
FW	ENG	George Rushton (to Swindon Town)

Pos.	Nation	Player
FW	ENG	Alf Walker (to Wolverhampton Wanderers)

- Source: 100 Years of Brentford,

== Coaching staff ==
Name	Role
(England) Fred Halliday	Secretary Manager
(England) Tom Cowper	Trainer

== Statistics ==
=== Appearances ===

Brentford's highest appearance-makers in each position during the Southern League season.

=== Goalscorers ===
Pos.	Nat	Player	SL1	FAC	Total
FW	(Scotland)	Geordie Reid	17	2	19
FW	(England)	Bert Hollinrake	8	0	8
FW	(England)	Albert Bartlett	5	0	5
FW	(Scotland)	Adam Bowman	4	0	4
FW	(England)	George Anderson	3	0	3
FW	(Scotland)	Bill McCafferty	3	0	3
FW	(England)	Alf Walker	3	0	3
DF	(England)	Dusty Rhodes	2	0	2
FW	(England)	George Rushton	2	0	2
HB	(England)	Phil Richards	1	0	1
HB	(England)	James Riley	1	0	1
FW	(England)	Jack Sibbald	1	0	1
Total			50	2	52

- Players listed in italics left the club mid-season.
- Source: 100 Years Of Brentford

=== Management ===
Name	Nat	From	To	Record All Comps					Record League				
Name	Nat	From	To	P	W	D	L	W %	P	W	D	L	W %
Fred Halliday	(England)	1 September 1909	30 April 1910	44	17	9	18	38.64	42	16	9	17	38.10

=== Summary ===
Games played	44 (42 Southern League First Division, 2 FA Cup)
Games won	17 (16 Southern League First Division, 1 FA Cup)
Games drawn	9 (9 Southern League First Division, 0 FA Cup)
Games lost	18 (17 Southern League First Division, 1 FA Cup)
Goals scored	52 (50 Southern League First Division, 2 FA Cup)
Goals conceded	60 (58 Southern League First Division, 2 FA Cup)
Clean sheets	16 (16 Southern League First Division, 0 FA Cup)
Biggest league win	3–0 on two occasions; 4–1 on two occasions
Worst league defeat	4–0 versus Swindon Town, 8 September 1909; 5–1 versus Norwich City, 12 February 1910
Most appearances	44, Albert Bartlett, Archie Ling (42 Southern League First Division, 2 FA Cup)
Top scorer (league)	17, Geordie Reid
Top scorer (all competitions)	19, Geordie Reid
