= 1910–11 Brentford F.C. season =

English football team season

Brentford
1910–11 season
- Chairman: H. Jason-Saunders
- Secretary Manager: Fred Halliday
- Stadium: Griffin Park
- Southern League First Division: 12th
- FA Cup: First round
- Top goalscorer: League: Reid (21); All: Reid (21)
- Highest home attendance: 14,000
- Lowest home attendance: 3,000
Home colours

During the 1910–11 English football season, Brentford competed in the Southern League First Division. Despite contending for promotion during the first half of the season, injuries dropped the Bees to a mid-table finish.

== Season summary ==
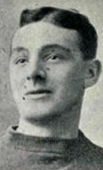
Centre forward Geordie Reid scored over half of Brentford's goals during the season.

A £315 loss on the 1909–10 season meant that there was little transfer activity for Brentford manager Fred Halliday to conduct over the course of the 1910 off-season, with half back George Kennedy, full back John Christie and returning outside right Joe Ryalls being the only signings of note. The Bees had a good first half of the Southern League First Division season, losing just five of the opening 20 matches, with Geordie Reid (Southern League XI) and Steve Buxton and John Christie (both London XI) winning representative honours. Despite the promising form, the majority of the team's goals were scored by Reid, who bagged 14 goals in a 17-match spell.

Brentford's promotion challenge was effectively ended by a 3–0 defeat to Swindon Town (champions at the end of the season) on 7 January 1911 and the team slipped from 5th position into mid-table. Injuries to George Kennedy, Joe Ryalls, Geordie Reid and George Anderson at differing times disrupted the attack and Brentford finished the season having scored 41 league goals, with Geordie Reid having scored over half the team's total (21), which equalled Adam Bowman's club record for most Southern League goals in a season. Some pride was salvaged with victory over West London rivals Queens Park Rangers in the inaugural Ealing Hospital Cup in April.

== League table ==
Pos	Team	Pld	W	D	L	GF	GA	GR	Pts
10	Norwich City	38	15	8	15	46	48	0.958	38
11	Coventry City	38	16	6	16	65	68	0.956	38
12	Brentford	38	14	9	15	41	42	0.976	37
13	Exeter City	38	14	9	15	51	53	0.962	37
14	Watford	38	13	9	16	49	65	0.754	35

Rules for classification: The system of using goal average to separate two teams tied on points was used up until the 1976-77 season. The points system: 2 points for a win, 1 point for a draw and 0 points for losing.

== Results ==
Brentford's goal tally listed first.

=== Legend ===
Win	Draw	Loss

=== Southern League First Division ===
No.	Date	Opponent	Venue	Result	Scorer(s)
1	3 September 1910	Exeter City	A	0–0	
2	10 September 1910	Swindon Town	H	1–1	Ling (pen)
3	17 September 1910	Bristol Rovers	A	1–0	Ling (pen)
4	24 September 1910	Crystal Palace	H	2–1	Kennedy, Reid
5	28 September 1910	New Brompton	A	1–2	Ryalls
6	1 October 1910	Norwich City	H	2–0	Hollinrake, Ryalls
7	8 October 1910	Leyton	A	1–4	Reid
8	15 October 1910	Watford	H	2–0	Sibbald, Anderson
9	22 October 1910	Plymouth Argyle	A	0–2	
10	29 October 1910	Southampton	H	3–2	Reid (2), Kennedy
11	5 November 1910	Southend United	A	2–0	Sibbald, Bartlett
12	12 November 1910	Coventry City	H	1–0	Reid
13	26 November 1910	Millwall	H	3–1	Reid (3)
14	3 December 1910	Queens Park Rangers	A	0–2	
15	10 December 1910	West Ham United	H	3–0	Hollinrake (2), Reid
16	17 December 1910	Luton Town	A	1–1	Reid
17	24 December 1910	Portsmouth	H	2–0	Hamilton, Reid
18	26 December 1910	Northampton Town	A	0–2	
19	27 December 1910	Northampton Town	H	0–0	
20	31 December 1910	Exeter City	H	3–1	Reid (3)
21	7 January 1911	Swindon Town	A	0–3	
22	21 January 1911	Bristol Rovers	H	3–0	Sibbald, Hollinrake, Reid
23	28 January 1911	Crystal Palace	A	1–1	Sibbald
24	11 February 1911	Leyton	H	0–0	
25	18 February 1911	Watford	A	0–1	
26	25 February 1911	Plymouth Argyle	H	1–2	Reid
27	4 March 1911	Southampton	A	0–2	
28	11 March 1911	Southend United	H	3–1	Reid (3)
29	18 March 1911	Coventry City	A	0–2	
30	25 March 1911	New Brompton	H	0–2	
31	1 April 1911	Millwall	A	1–1	Sibbald
32	8 April 1911	Queens Park Rangers	H	1–1	Anderson
33	14 April 1911	Brighton & Hove Albion	A	0–1	
34	15 April 1911	West Ham United	A	0–2	
35	17 April 1911	Brighton & Hove Albion	H	1–1	Reid
36	18 April 1911	Norwich City	A	0–1	
37	22 April 1911	Luton Town	H	1–0	Bartlett
38	29 April 1911	Portsmouth	A	1–2	Reid

=== FA Cup ===
Round	Date	Opponent	Venue	Result
R1	14 January 1911	Preston North End	H	0–1

- Source: 100 Years Of Brentford

== Playing squad ==
Players' ages are as of the opening day of the 1910–11 season.

Pos.	Name	Nat.	Date of birth (age)	Signed from	Signed in	Notes
Goalkeepers
GK	Archie Ling	(England)	14 March 1881 (aged 29)	Swindon Town	1909	
Defenders
DF	Steve Buxton	(England)	3 February 1888 (aged 22)	South Bank	1908	
DF	John Christie	(Scotland)	8 February 1881 (aged 29)	Croydon Common	1910	
DF	Dusty Rhodes	(England)	16 August 1882 (aged 28)	Sunderland	1908	
Midfielders
HB	Bert Badger	(England)	4 October 1882 (aged 27)	Nottingham Forest	1910	
HB	Alec Barclay	(England)	1 November 1885 (aged 24)	Ilford	1910	Amateur
HB	Jock Hamilton	(Scotland)	28 February 1879 (aged 31)	Leeds City	1909	
HB	George Kennedy	(Scotland)	12 March 1882 (aged 28)	Chelsea	1910	
HB	Jack Land	(England)	31 March 1883 (aged 27)	Hounslow	1910	
HB	Phil Richards	(England)	19 February 1884 (aged 26)	Bradford Park Avenue	1908	
Forwards
FW	George Anderson	(England)	29 November 1879 (aged 30)	Birmingham	1909	
FW	Albert Bartlett	(England)	10 April 1884 (aged 26)	Bradford City	1909	
FW	George Frost (c)	(England)	24 December 1887 (aged 22)	Wallsend Elm Villa	1910	
FW	Bert Hollinrake	(England)	26 September 1890 (aged 19)	South Ealing Rovers	1909	Amateur
FW	James MacDonald	(England)	1 October 1887 (aged 22)	Hanwell	1909	
FW	Geordie Reid	(Scotland)	30 January 1882 (aged 28)	Bradford Park Avenue	1908	
FW	Joe Ryalls	(England)	3 January 1881 (aged 29)	Nottingham Forest	1910	
FW	Jack Sibbald	(England)	12 September 1890 (aged 19)	Wallsend Elm Villa	1910	

- Source: 100 Years Of Brentford, Football League Players' Records 1888 to 1939

== Coaching staff ==
Name	Role
(England) Fred Halliday	Secretary Manager
(England) Tom Cowper	Trainer

== Statistics ==
=== Appearances and goals ===

Brentford's highest appearance-makers in each position during the Southern League season.

Pos	Nat	Name	League		FA Cup		Total	
Pos	Nat	Name	Apps	Goals	Apps	Goals	Apps	Goals
GK	(England)	Archie Ling	38	2	1	0	39	2
DF	(England)	Steve Buxton	38	0	1	0	39	0
DF	(Scotland)	John Christie	5	0	0	0	5	0
DF	(England)	Dusty Rhodes	33	0	1	0	34	0
HB	(England)	Bert Badger	13	0	0	0	13	0
HB	(England)	Alec Barclay	6	0	0	0	6	0
HB	(Scotland)	Jock Hamilton	37	1	1	0	38	1
HB	(Scotland)	George Kennedy	22	2	1	0	23	2
HB	(England)	Jack Land	4	0	0	0	4	0
HB	(England)	Phil Richards	34	0	1	0	35	0
FW	(England)	George Anderson	29	2	1	0	30	2
FW	(England)	Albert Bartlett	30	2	1	0	31	2
FW	(England)	George Frost	7	0	0	0	7	0
FW	(England)	Bert Hollinrake	19	4	1	0	20	4
FW	(England)	James MacDonald	4	0	—		4	0
FW	(Scotland)	Geordie Reid	35	21	1	0	36	21
FW	(England)	Joe Ryalls	35	2	1	0	36	2
FW	(England)	Jack Sibbald	29	5	0	0	29	5

- Players listed in italics left the club mid-season.
- Source: 100 Years Of Brentford

=== Goalscorers ===
Pos.	Nat	Player	SL1	FAC	Total
FW	(Scotland)	Geordie Reid	21	0	21
FW	(England)	Jack Sibbald	5	0	5
FW	(England)	Bert Hollinrake	4	0	4
FW	(England)	George Anderson	2	0	2
FW	(England)	Albert Bartlett	2	0	2
HB	(Scotland)	George Kennedy	2	0	2
GK	(England)	Archie Ling	2	0	2
FW	(England)	Joe Ryalls	2	0	2
Total			41	0	41

- Players listed in italics left the club mid-season.
- Source: 100 Years Of Brentford

=== Management ===
Name	Nat	From	To	Record All Comps					Record League				
Name	Nat	From	To	P	W	D	L	W %	P	W	D	L	W %
Fred Halliday	(England)	3 September 1910	29 April 1911	39	14	9	16	35.90|	38	14	9	15	36.84

=== Summary ===
Games played	39 (38 Southern League First Division, 1 FA Cup)
Games won	14 (14 Southern League First Division, 0 FA Cup)
Games drawn	9 (9 Southern League First Division, 0 FA Cup)
Games lost	16 (15 Southern League First Division, 1 FA Cup)
Goals scored	41 (41 Southern League First Division, 0 FA Cup)
Goals conceded	43 (42 Southern League First Division, 1 FA Cup)
Clean sheets	12 (12 Southern League First Division, 0 FA Cup)
Biggest league win	3–0 on two occasions
Worst league defeat	3–0 versus Swindon Town, 7 January 1911; 4–1 versus Leyton, 8 October 1910
Most appearances	39, Steve Buxton, Archie Ling (38 Southern League First Division, 1 FA Cup)
Top scorer (league)	21, Geordie Reid
Top scorer (all competitions)	21, Geordie Reid

== Transfers & loans ==
Players transferred in
Date	Pos.	Name	Previous club	Fee	Ref.
12 May 1910	FW	(England) Joe Ryalls	(England) Nottingham Forest	n/a	
20 July 1910	HB	(Scotland) George Kennedy	(England) Chelsea	n/a	
July 1910	DF	(England) William Harwood	(England) Cubbington Albion	Amateur	
30 August 1910	DF	(England) Arthur Cleverley	(England) Yiewsley	n/a	
16 September 1910	DF	(Scotland) John Christie	(England) Croydon Common	n/a	
19 December 1910	HB	(England) Bert Badger	(England) Nottingham Forest	Free	
December 1910	FW	(England) Herbert Daniels	(England) Kingstonian	Amateur	
December 1910	HB	(England) Dudley Page	(England) Kingstonian	Amateur	
1910	HB	(England) Walter Allen	(England) Barnet & Alston	Amateur	
1910	HB	(England) Charles Allwright	(England) Hanwell Town	Amateur	
1910	FW	(England) Grantham Bowler	n/a	n/a	
1910	HB	(England) Alec Barclay	(England) Ilford	Amateur	
1910	FW	(Ireland) John Caborn	(England) Uxbridge	Amateur	
1910	FW	(England) John Chuter	Unattached	Amateur	
1910	FW	(England) Thomas Dorey	Unattached	Amateur	
1910	FW	(England) Raymond Edwards	Unattached	Amateur	
1910	FB	(England) Albert Hooper	Unattached	Amateur	
1910	GK	(England) A. Lovegrove	Unattached	Amateur	
1910	FB	(England) R. Middleton	Unattached	Amateur	
1910	FW	(England) R. A. Nicholls	Unattached	Amateur	
1910	FW	(England) Henry Trumper	(England) Ealing Wednesday	Amateur	
1910	FW	(England) Harry Washington	Unattached	Amateur	
10 April 1911	HB	(England) Henry Hogarth	(England) Burnley	n/a	
Players transferred out
Date	Pos.	Name	Subsequent club	Fee	Ref.
19 May 1910	FW	(England) James Swarbrick	(England) Stoke	Nominal	
Players released
Date	Pos.	Name	Subsequent club	Join date	Ref.
August 1910	HB	(England) William Harwood	(England) Cubbington Albion	n/a	
March 1911	HB	(England) Dudley Page	(England) Crystal Palace	16 March 1911	
April 1911	FW	(England) Albert Bartlett	(England) Reading	30 August 1911	
April 1911	HB	(England) Charlie Blackall	n/a	n/a	
April 1911	FW	(England) George Frost	n/a	n/a	
April 1911	FW	(England) Bert Hollinrake	n/a	n/a	
April 1911	FW	(England) James MacDonald	(England) Croydon Common	18 July 1911	
April 1911	FW	(England) Joe Ryalls	(England) Chesterfield Town	15 September 1911	
