= 1912–13 Brentford F.C. season =

English football team season

Brentford
1912–13 season
- Chairman: H. Jason-Saunders
- Manager: Fred Halliday (until 13 November 1912); Dusty Rhodes (from 13 November 1912)
- Stadium: Griffin Park
- Southern League First Division: 19th
- FA Cup: Fourth qualifying round
- Top goalscorer: League: Smith (12); All: Smith (12)
- Highest home attendance: 10,000
- Lowest home attendance: 2,000
Home colours

During the 1912–13 English football season, Brentford competed in the Southern League First Division. Two long losing runs led to the Bees' relegation to the Second Division on the final day of the season.

== Season summary ==
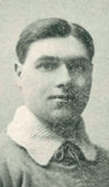
Archie Ling was the first Brentford goalkeeper to make 100 league appearances and retired at the end of the season.

After three consecutive mid-table seasons, Southern League First Division club Brentford's directors gambled on generating extra income by also entering the Southern Alliance. Consequently, a larger squad was assembled, with many of the previous season's professionals retained. Willis Rippon was the only significant departure – sold for £250 to Hamilton Academical. Secretary-manager Fred Halliday brought in goalkeeper Ted Price, full back Tommy Fells, centre half Frank Bentley and forwards Frederick Chapple and James Morrison.

Brentford had a torrid beginning to the season, losing 12 of the first 15 matches. Of the starting forward line of Billy Brawn, Jack Sibbald, Frederick Chapple, Bob McTavish and Patsy Hendren, Chapple and Hendren were the only players to score during the period, which lead manager Halliday to sign Chelsea's Hugh Dolby and Bill Smith from non-league football. Dolby failed to score in four matches and was dropped, while Smith helped contribute to a revival in mid-November, after full back Dusty Rhodes replaced Fred Halliday as manager on 13 November 1912. Between 9 November and 5 March 1913, Brentford lost just three matches, but another loss of form and injuries to the forward line led to seven consecutive defeats in March. A crucial 4–1 victory over Brighton & Hove Albion on 5 April boosted the Bees' survival chances, but a defeat and a win in the following two matches respectively put Brentford one place above the relegation zone going into the final day, level on points with Norwich City, but ahead by virtue of a 0.774 goal average.

Brentford would play away to Merthyr Town and Norwich City away to Reading on Saturday 26 April, but torrential rain and gale force winds forced the Bees' match to be postponed twice, to the following Tuesday. Norwich City won their match 5–2, but the scoreline would not guarantee the Canaries' safety on goal average if Brentford won their match by any score. On Tuesday 29 April, Brentford conceded the opening goal to Merthyr Town, before Bill Smith equalised two minutes after half time. In the final 10 minutes, Brentford pushed forward and were hit on the break with just two minutes remaining, losing the match 2–1 and with it the club's First Division status.

== League table ==
Pos	Team	Pld	W	D	L	GF	GA	GR	Pts	Relegation
16	Bristol Rovers	38	12	9	17	55	64	0.859	33	
17	Southampton	38	10	11	17	40	72	0.556	31	
18	Norwich City	38	10	9	19	39	50	0.780	29	
19	Brentford	38	11	5	22	42	55	0.764	27	Relegated to Division Two
20	Stoke	38	10	4	24	39	75	0.520	24	Relegated to Division Two

Source: rsssf.com
Rules for classification: The system of using goal average to separate two teams tied on points was used up until the 1976-77 season. The points system: 2 points for a win, 1 point for a draw and 0 points for losing.

== Results ==
Brentford's goal tally listed first.

=== Legend ===
Win	Draw	Loss

=== Southern League First Division ===
No.	Date	Opponent	Venue	Result	Scorer(s)	Notes
1	4 September 1912	Crystal Palace	A	1–3	Chapple	
2	7 September 1912	Reading	H	1–0	Chapple	
3	14 September 1912	Norwich City	A	0–2		
4	18 September 1912	Crystal Palace	H	2–1	Chapple (2)	
5	21 September 1912	Gillingham	H	0–1		
6	28 September 1912	Northampton Town	A	0–2		
7	5 October 1912	Queens Park Rangers	H	0–2		
8	9 October 1912	Watford	A	0–1		
9	12 October 1912	Stoke	A	0–1		
10	19 October 1912	Millwall	A	2–3	Hendren (2)	
11	26 October 1912	Bristol Rovers	H	0–1		
12	2 November 1912	Swindon Town	A	0–2		
13	9 November 1912	Portsmouth	H	1–0	Smith	
14	16 November 1912	Exeter City	A	0–1		
15	23 November 1912	West Ham United	H	5–1	Sibbald (2), Chapple (3)	
16	7 December 1912	Coventry City	H	2–0	Smith (2)	
17	21 December 1912	Merthyr Town	H	2–0	Smith, Spratt (pen)	
18	25 December 1912	Plymouth Argyle	H	2–2	Brawn, McTavish	
19	28 December 1912	Reading	A	1–4	Hendren	
20	4 January 1913	Norwich City	H	1–0	Hendren (pen)	
21	18 January 1913	Gillingham	A	4–0	Barclay, Smith (3)	
22	25 January 1913	Northampton Town	H	0–0		
23	8 February 1913	Queens Park Rangers	A	1–2	Hendren (pen)	
24	15 February 1913	Stoke	H	4–2	Chapple, Hendren (2, 1 pen), Smith	
25	22 February 1913	Millwall	H	0–0		
26	1 March 1913	Bristol Rovers	A	1–1	Sibbald	
27	5 March 1913	Brighton & Hove Albion	A	2–2	Chapple, Brawn	
28	8 March 1913	Swindon Town	H	0–3		
29	12 March 1913	Plymouth Argyle	A	0–3		(Note: The match was a replay of the original fixture on 26 December 1912, which was abandoned after 49 minutes due to a waterlogged pitch. Plymouth Argyle were leading 2–0 at the time.)
30	15 March 1913	Portsmouth	A	0–1		
31	21 March 1913	Southampton	H	1–2	Brawn	
32	22 March 1913	Exeter City	H	0–1		
33	24 March 1913	Southampton	A	1–3	Brawn (pen)	
34	29 March 1913	West Ham United	A	1–2	Hendren	
35	5 April 1913	Brighton & Hove Albion	H	4–1	Smith (2), Chapple, Hendren	
36	12 April 1913	Coventry City	A	0–3		
37	19 April 1913	Watford	H	2–0	Chapple, Smith	
38	29 April 1913	Merthyr Town	A	1–2	Smith	

=== FA Cup ===
Round	Date	Opponent	Venue	Result	Scorer
QR4	30 November 1912	Watford	H	0–0	
QR4 (replay)	4 December 1912	Watford	A	1–5	McTavish

- Source: 100 Years Of Brentford

== Playing squad ==
Players' ages are as of the opening day of the 1912–13 season.

Pos.	Name	Nat.	Date of birth (age)	Signed from	Signed in	Notes
Goalkeepers
GK	Archie Ling	(England)	14 March 1881 (aged 31)	Swindon Town	1909	
GK	Ted Price	(England)	13 June 1883 (aged 29)	Croydon Common	1912	
Defenders
DF	Tommy Fells	(England)	8 January 1890 (aged 22)	South Kirkby	1913	
DF	William Hickleton	(England)	12 May 1882 (aged 30)	Coventry City	1911	On loan from Coventry City
DF	Dusty Rhodes (c)	(England)	16 August 1882 (aged 30)	Sunderland	1908	
DF	Walter Spratt	(England)	14 April 1889 (aged 23)	Rotherham Town	1911	
Midfielders
HB	Alec Barclay	(England)	1 November 1885 (aged 26)	Ilford	1910	Amateur
HB	Frank Bentley	(England)	9 October 1886 (aged 25)	Tottenham Hotspur	1912	
HB	George Kennedy	(Scotland)	12 March 1882 (aged 30)	Chelsea	1910	
HB	Phil Richards	(England)	19 February 1884 (aged 28)	Bradford Park Avenue	1908	
Forwards
FW	Billy Brawn	(England)	1 August 1878 (aged 34)	Chelsea	1911	
FW	Frederick Chapple	(England)	3 February 1884 (aged 28)	Crewe Alexandra	1912	
FW	Hugh Dolby	(England)	6 March 1888 (aged 24)	Chelsea	1912	
FW	Thomas Graham	(England)	20 July 1887 (aged 25)	Castleford Town	1911	
FW	Patsy Hendren	(England)	5 February 1889 (aged 23)	Coventry City	1911	Played when his cricket commitments allowed
FW	Bob McTavish	(Scotland)	26 October 1888 (aged 23)	Tottenham Hotspur	1912	
FW	John Morrison	(Scotland)	18 January 1888 (aged 24)	West Ham United	1912	
FW	Jack Sibbald	(England)	12 September 1890 (aged 21)	Wallsend Elm Villa	1910	
FW	Bill Smith	(England)	23 June 1887 (aged 25)	Hickleton Main Colliery	1912	

- Source: 100 Years Of Brentford, Football League Players' Records 1888 to 1939

== Coaching staff ==
=== Fred Halliday (4 September–13 November 1912) ===
Name	Role
(England) Fred Halliday	Secretary Manager
(England) Tom Cowper	Trainer

=== Dusty Rhodes (13 November 1912 – 29 April 1913) ===
Name	Role
(England) Dusty Rhodes	Manager
(England) Fred Halliday	Secretary
(England) Tom Cowper	Trainer

== Statistics ==
=== Appearances and goals ===

Brentford's highest appearance-makers in each position during the Southern League season.

Pos	Nat	Name	League		FA Cup		Total	
Pos	Nat	Name	Apps	Goals	Apps	Goals	Apps	Goals
GK	(England)	Ted Price	37	0	2	0	39	0
GK	(England)	Archie Ling	1	0	0	0	1	0
DF	(England)	Tommy Fells	8	0	0	0	8	0
DF	(England)	Dusty Rhodes	33	0	0	0	33	0
DF	(England)	Walter Spratt	30	1	2	0	32	1
HB	(England)	Alec Barclay	31	1	2	0	33	1
HB	(England)	Frank Bentley	31	0	2	0	33	0
HB	(Scotland)	George Kennedy	23	0	0	0	23	0
HB	(England)	Phil Richards	24	0	2	0	26	0
FW	(England)	Billy Brawn	35	4	2	0	37	4
FW	(England)	Frederick Chapple	28	11	2	0	30	11
FW	(England)	Hugh Dolby	4	0	0	0	4	0
FW	(England)	Thomas Graham	2	0	0	0	2	0
FW	(England)	Patsy Hendren	35	9	2	0	37	9
FW	(Scotland)	Bob McTavish	26	0	2	1	28	1
FW	(Scotland)	John Morrison	10	0	0	0	10	0
FW	(England)	Jack Sibbald	23	3	2	0	25	3
FW	(England)	Bill Smith	27	12	0	0	27	12
Players loaned in during the season
DF	(England)	William Hickleton	10	0	2	0	12	0

- Players listed in italics left the club mid-season.
- Source: 100 Years Of Brentford

=== Goalscorers ===
Pos.	Nat	Player	SL1	FAC	Total
FW	(England)	Bill Smith	12	0	12
FW	(England)	Frederick Chapple	11	0	11
FW	(England)	Patsy Hendren	9	0	9
FW	(England)	Billy Brawn	4	0	4
FW	(England)	Jack Sibbald	3	0	3
HB	(England)	Alec Barclay	1	0	1
DF	(England)	Walter Spratt	1	0	1
FW	(Scotland)	Bob McTavish	0	1	1
Total			42	1	43

- Players listed in italics left the club mid-season.
- Source: 100 Years Of Brentford

=== Amateur international caps ===
Pos.	Nat	Player	Caps	Goals	Ref
HB	(England)	Alec Barclay	2	0	

=== Management ===
Name	Nat	From	To	Record All Comps					Record League				
Name	Nat	From	To	P	W	D	L	W %	P	W	D	L	W %
Fred Halliday	(England)	4 September 1912	13 November 1912	13	3	0	10	23.08|	13	3	0	10	23.08
Dusty Rhodes	(England)	13 November 1912	29 April 1913	27	7	6	14	25.93|	25	7	5	13	28.00

=== Summary ===
Games played	40 (38 Southern League First Division, 2 FA Cup)
Games won	11 (11 Southern League First Division, 0 FA Cup)
Games drawn	6 (5 Southern League First Division, 1 FA Cup)
Games lost	23 (22 Southern League First Division, 1 FA Cup)
Goals scored	43 (42 Southern League First Division, 1 FA Cup)
Goals conceded	60 (55 Southern League First Division, 5 FA Cup)
Clean sheets	10 (9 Southern League First Division, 1 FA Cup)
Biggest league win	4–0 versus Gillingham, 18 January 1913; 5–1 versus West Ham United, 23 November 1912
Worst league defeat	3–0 on three occasions; 4–1 versus Reading, 28 December 1912
Most appearances	39, Ted Price (37 Southern League First Division, 2 FA Cup)
Top scorer (league)	12, Bill Smith
Top scorer (all competitions)	12, Bill Smith

== Transfers & loans ==
Players transferred in
Date	Pos.	Name	Previous club	Fee	Ref.
7 May 1912	DF	(England) Tommy Fells	(England) South Kirkby	n/a	
2 July 1912	HB	(England) Frank Bentley	(England) Tottenham Hotspur	n/a	
10 July 1912	GK	(England) Ted Price	(England) Croydon Common	n/a	
7 August 1912	FW	(Scotland) John Morrison	(England) West Ham United	n/a	
14 August 1912	FW	(England) Frederick Chapple	(England) Crewe Alexandra	£150	
August 1912	FW	(England) Albert Markwick	(England) Guildford	Amateur	
2 October 1912	FW	(England) Hugh Dolby	(England) Chelsea	n/a	
19 October 1912	FW	(England) Bill Smith	(England) Hickleton Main Colliery	n/a	
Players loaned in
Date	Pos.	Name	Subsequent club	Date to	Ref.
25 May 1912	DF	(England) William Hickleton	(England) Coventry City	End of season	
Players transferred out
Date	Pos.	Name	Subsequent club	Fee	Ref.
June 1912	FW	(England) Willie Furr	(England) Leicester Fosse	n/a	
6 August 1912	FW	(Scotland) Willis Rippon	(Scotland) Hamilton Academical	£250	
August 1912	DF	(England) Arthur Cleverley	(Wales) Swansea Town	n/a	
August 1912	HB	(Scotland) Jock Hamilton	(Wales) Swansea Town	n/a	
Players released
Date	Pos.	Name	Subsequent club	Join date	Ref.
April 1913	FW	(England) Hugh Dolby	(England) Clowne White Star	22 August 1913	
April 1913	FW	(England) Thomas Graham	(England) Allerton Bywater Colliery	n/a	
April 1913	HB	(Scotland) George Kennedy	(Scotland) Dumfries	n/a	
April 1913	GK	(England) Archie Ling	Retired		
April 1913	FW	(England) Jack Sibbald	(England) Wallsend	18 June 1913	
