= Ernie Rhodes =

English footballer

Personal information
- Full name: Ernest Rhodes
- Date of birth: 6 October 1888
- Place of birth: South Bank, England
- Date of death: 1957 (aged 69)
- Place of death: Billingham, England
- Position: Left back

Senior career*
Years	Team	Apps	(Gls)
–1907	Grangetown Athletic		
1907–	Sunderland		
1912–1913	Gravesend United		
1913–1923	Crystal Palace	142	(1)
- Sheppey United
- * Club domestic league appearances and goals

Ernest Rhodes (6 October 1888 – 1957) was an English professional footballer who played in the Southern League and the Football League for Crystal Palace as a left back.

== Personal life ==
Rhodes' brother Dusty was also a footballer.

== Honours ==
Crystal Palace

- Football League Third Division: 1920–21
