= Hugh Dolby =

English footballer

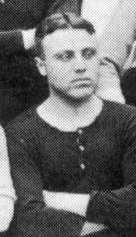
- Dolby while with Brentford in 1912.

Personal information
- Full name: Hugh Ryde Heath Dolby
- Date of birth: 6 March 1888
- Place of birth: Agra, British India
- Date of death: June 1964 (aged 76)
- Place of death: Battersea, England
- Position: Outside right

Senior career*
| Years | Team | Apps | (Gls) |
- Clapham
- Nunhead
| 1909–1912 | Chelsea | 2 | (0) |
| 1912–1913 | Brentford | 4 | (0) |
- Clowne White Star
- * Club domestic league appearances and goals

Hugh Ryde Heath Dolby (6 March 1888 – June 1964) was an English professional footballer who made two appearances in the Football League for Chelsea as an outside right.

== Career statistics ==
Appearances and goals by club, season and competition
| Club | Season | League | | | FA Cup | | Total | |
| Club | Season | Division | Apps | Goals | Apps | Goals | Apps | Goals |
|---|---|---|---|---|---|---|---|---|
| Chelsea | 1909–10 | First Division | 1 | 0 | 0 | 0 | 1 | 0 |
| Chelsea | 1910–11 | Second Division | 1 | 0 | 0 | 0 | 1 | 0 |
| Chelsea | Total | | 2 | 0 | 0 | 0 | 2 | 0 |
| Brentford | 1912–13 | Southern League First Division | 4 | 0 | 0 | 0 | 4 | 0 |
| Career total | | | 6 | 0 | 0 | 0 | 6 | 0 |
