= Joe Ryalls =

English footballer

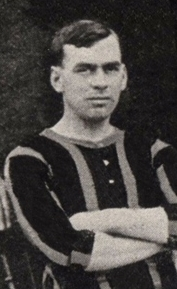
- Ryalls while with Brentford in 1908.

Personal information
- Full name: Joseph Ryalls
- Date of birth: 3 January 1881
- Place of birth: Ecclesall, England
- Date of death: 6 March 1952 (aged 71)
- Place of death: Pontefract, England
- Position: Outside right

Senior career*
Years	Team	Apps	(Gls)
1900–1901	Montrose Works		
1901–1905	The Wednesday	2	(0)
1905–1906	Barnsley	17	(0)
1906–1907	Fulham		
1907–1908	Rotherham Town		
1908–1909	Brentford	40	(1)
1909–1910	Nottingham Forest	9	(0)
1910–1911	Brentford	35	(2)
1911–1912	Chesterfield Town	27	(1)
- * Club domestic league appearances and goals

Joseph Ryalls (3 January 1881 – 6 March 1952) was an English professional footballer who played as an outside right in the Football League for Barnsley, Nottingham Forest and The Wednesday.

== Career statistics ==
Appearances and goals by club, season and competition
Club	Season	League			FA Cup		Total	
Club	Season	Division	Apps	Goals	Apps	Goals	Apps	Goals
The Wednesday	1902–03	First Division	1	0	0	0	1	0
The Wednesday	1903–04	First Division	1	0	0	0	1	0
The Wednesday	Total		2	0	0	0	2	0
Brentford	1908–09	Southern League First Division	40	1	2	0	42	1
Nottingham Forest	1909–10	First Division	9	0	0	0	9	0
Brentford	1910–11	Southern League First Division	35	2	1	0	36	2
Brentford	Total		75	3	3	0	78	3
Chesterfield Town	1911–12	Midland League	27	1	1	0	28	1
Career total			113	4	4	0	117	4
