= Tommy Fells =

English footballer

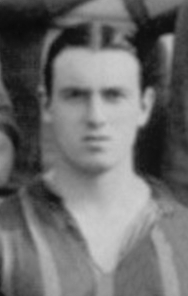
- Fells while with Brentford in 1912.

Personal information
- Full name: Thomas Fells
- Date of birth: 8 January 1890
- Place of birth: Rotherham, England
- Date of death: 1942 (aged 52)
- Place of death: Don Valley, England
- Position: Full back

Senior career*
Years	Team	Apps	(Gls)
1907–1911	Rotherham County		
1911–1912	South Kirkby		
1912–1914	Brentford	15	(0)
1919–1920	South Kirkby		
- * Club domestic league appearances and goals

Thomas Fells (1890–1942) was an English footballer who played as a full back for South Kirkby, Rotherham County and Brentford

== Playing career ==
Fells began his football career with Rotherham County at least as early as 1907 who were regulars in the FA Cup at that time. He next joined South Kirkby then joined Brentford in 1912. In the 1912–13 season he made 8 appearances for Brentford and in 1913–14 he made 7 appearances. In total he made 15 appearances for Brentford. After World War One, Tommy Fells is known to have returned to South Kirkby Colliery in 1919.
