= Fred Halliday (footballer) =

English footballer and manager

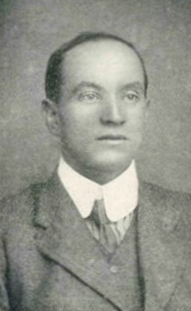
- Halliday while Brentford manager in 1911.

Personal information
- Full name: John Frederick Halliday
- Date of birth: 19 April 1880
- Place of birth: Chester, England
- Date of death: 20 May 1953 (aged 73)
- Place of death: Willesden, England
- Height: 5 ft 10 1/2 in (1.79 m)
- Position: Full back

Senior career*
Years	Team	Apps	(Gls)
–1898	Chester		
1898–1900	Liverpool	0	(0)
1899–1900	Crewe Alexandra		
1900–1901	Everton	0	(0)
1901–1903	Bolton Wanderers	27	(0)
1903–1907	Bradford City	72	(0)
1907–1908	Bradford Park Avenue	1	(0)
Total		100	(0)

Managerial career
- 1907–1908: Bradford Park Avenue
- 1908–1912: Brentford
- 1915–1921: Brentford
- 1924–1926: Brentford
- * Club domestic league appearances and goals

John Frederick Halliday (19 April 1880 – 20 May 1953) was an English professional footballer and manager who played as a full back in the Football League for Bolton Wanderers and Bradford City. He went on to manage Bradford Park Avenue and Brentford. He was posthumously inducted into the Brentford Hall of Fame in 2015.

== Playing career ==
Halliday began his career as an amateur at local club Chester, playing in The Combination. He transferred to First Division club Liverpool in April 1898, but failed to make a first team appearance. Prior to his release from Liverpool on a free transfer, Halliday played for Lancashire League club Crewe Alexandra. He joined cross-city rivals Everton in 1900, but failed to make an appearance for the Toffees before moving to Bolton Wanderers in 1901.

Halliday left Bolton Wanderers at the end of the 1902–03 season, after the club's relegation to the Second Division was confirmed. He moved to newly founded Second Division club Bradford City prior to the beginning of the 1903–04 season. He made 72 appearances in the Football League and two FA Cup appearances for Bradford and departed Valley Parade in 1907.

== Management career ==
=== Bradford Park Avenue ===
Halliday became manager of Southern League First Division club Bradford Park Avenue in May 1907, guiding the club to a mid-table finish in the 1907–08 season. He made one playing appearance for the club as an emergency goalkeeper in a match versus Swindon Town, when regular keeper Tom Baddersley missed his train. He departed Park Avenue after the season.

=== Brentford ===
==== First spell (1908–1912) ====
Halliday joined Southern League First Division club Brentford as manager in June 1908, taking over from W. G. Brown. Halliday's team had a disastrous 1908–09 campaign in the league, finishing bottom (though avoiding relegation to the Second Division), but he brought silverware to the club, winning the Southern Professional Charity Cup. He led the Bees to a mid-table finishes in the 1909–10, 1910–11 and 1911–12 seasons. He carried on into the 1912–13 season, but with the club still in relegation trouble, Halliday stepped down in November 1912 and became the club's secretary. He was replaced by one of his players, Ephraim Rhodes.

==== Second spell (1915–1921) ====
Halliday stepped up to become Brentford manager for the second time in August 1915, replacing Ephraim Rhodes, who was inducted into the army. The break-out of the First World War in August 1914 led the Football League and Southern League to decide to cease operations at the end of the 1914–15 season until the end of hostilities, so Halliday took charge of a Brentford team playing in the unofficial War League and the newly formed London Combination. He managed the club in both leagues during the 1915–16, 1916–17, 1917–18 and 1918–19 seasons and won the London Combination title in the latter campaign.

Competitive football returned for the 1919–20 season and Halliday's Bees were elected back to the Southern League First Division, finishing in mid-table. Brentford won election to the Football League as founding members of the Third Division for the 1920–21 season. An unsuccessful season saw the Bees finish second-from-bottom and Halliday stepped down at the end of the campaign to return to administrative duties. He was replaced by Archie Mitchell.

==== Third spell (1924–1926) ====
After Archie Mitchell's sacking in December 1924, Halliday took over the manager's job for the third time. Another second-from-bottom finish followed in the 1924–25 season. An 18th-place finish followed in the 1925–26 season, after which Halliday left the Bees permanently. He managed the club in 334 matches, winning 108, drawing 70 and losing 156. Halliday was posthumously inducted into the Brentford Hall of Fame in 2015.

== Career statistics ==
=== Playing career ===
Appearances and goals by club, season and competition
Club	Season	League			FA Cup		Total	
Club	Season	Division	Apps	Goals	Apps	Goals	Apps	Goals
Bradford City	1903–04	Second Division	23	0	1	0	24	0
Career total			23	0	1	0	24	0

=== Managerial career ===
Managerial record by team and tenure
Team	From	To	Record					Ref
Team	From	To	P	W	D	L	Win %	Ref
Brentford	24 June 1908	13 November 1912	181	62	36	83	34.3	
Brentford	August 1915	August 1921	86	24	22	40	27.9	
Brentford	3 December 1924	May 1926	67	22	12	33	32.8	
Total			334	108	70	156	32.3	—

== Honours ==
=== As a manager ===
Brentford

- Southern Professional Charity Cup: 1908–09
- London Combination: 1918–19

=== As an individual ===
- Brentford Hall of Fame
