= John Christie (footballer, born 1881) =

Scottish footballer (1881–1934)

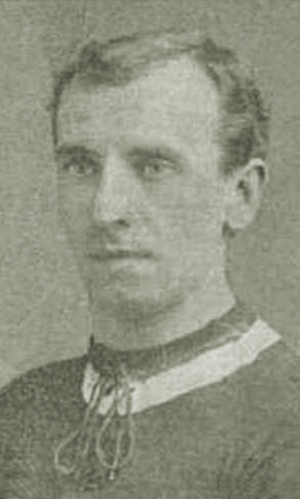
- Christie with Brentford in 1910

Personal information
- Full name: John Coubrough Christie
- Date of birth: 8 February 1881
- Place of birth: Calton, Scotland
- Date of death: 21 November 1934 (aged 53)
- Place of death: Manchester, England
- Height: 5 ft 8 in (1.73 m)
- Positions: Right-back; left half

Senior career*
Years	Team	Apps	(Gls)
- Sale Holmefield
1902–1904	Manchester United	1	(0)
1904–1907	Manchester City	10	(0)
1907–1908	Bradford (Park Avenue)	14	(0)
1908–1910	Croydon Common	36	(0)
1910–1911	Brentford	5	(0)
- Altrincham
- * Club domestic league appearances and goals

John Coubrough Christie (8 February 1881 – 21 November 1934) was a Scottish professional footballer who played as a right-back and left half in the Football League for rivals Manchester United and Manchester City. He also played in the Southern League for Bradford Park Avenue, Croydon Common and Brentford.

== Personal life ==
As of 1901, Christie was working as a railway porter. He served in the Royal Air Force during the First World War.

== Career statistics ==
Appearances and goals by club, season and competition
Club	Season	League			FA Cup		Total	
Club	Season	Division	Apps	Goals	Apps	Goals	Apps	Goals
Manchester United	1902–03	Football League Second Division	1	0	0	0	1	0
Manchester City	1904–05	Football League First Division	1	0	0	0	1	0
Manchester City	1905–06	Football League First Division	5	0	0	0	5	0
Manchester City	1906–07	Football League First Division	4	0	0	0	4	0
Manchester City	Total		10	0	0	0	10	0
Bradford (Park Avenue)	1907–08	Southern League First Division	14	0	0	0	14	0
Croydon Common	1908–09	Southern League Second Division	12	0	10	0	22	0
Croydon Common	1909–10	Southern League First Division	24	0	3	0	27	0
Croydon Common	Total		36	0	13	0	49	0
Brentford	1910–11	Southern League First Division	5	0	0	0	5	0
Career total			66	0	13	0	79	0

== Honours ==
Croydon Common

- Southern League Second Division: 1908–09

Brentford Reserves

- Great Western Suburban League: 1910–11
