= Heckmondwike F.C. =

Heckmondwike
- Full name: Heckmondwike Football Club

Heckmondwike F.C. was an English football club.

== History ==
The club joined the Midland League in 1914 but endured a disastrous campaign, conceding 169 goals, before being expelled from the competition for a failure to fulfil fixtures.

They also competed in the FA Cup from 1904 to 1914, reaching the 4th Qualifying Round in 1914.

== Former players ==
1. Players that have played/managed in the Football League or any foreign equivalent to this level (i.e. fully professional league).

2. Players with full international caps.

3. Players that hold a club record or have captained the club.

- (England) Albert Bartlett
