= Archie Ling =

English footballer and cricketer

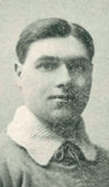
- Ling in 1911.

Personal information
- Full name: Arthur Samuel Ling
- Date of birth: 14 March 1881
- Place of birth: Grantchester, England
- Date of death: February 1943 (aged 61)
- Place of death: Brentford, England
- Position: Goalkeeper

Senior career*
Years	Team	Apps	(Gls)
1900–1901	Cambridge Swifts		
1901–1902	Albert Institute		
1902–1905	Leicester Fosse	59	(0)
1905–1909	Swindon Town	140	(7)
1909–1913	Brentford	112	(2)
- * Club domestic league appearances and goals

Arthur Samuel Ling (14 March 1881 – February 1943) was an English professional footballer, best remembered for his time as a goalkeeper in the Southern League with Swindon Town and Brentford. He also played in the Football League for Leicester Fosse and professional cricket for Cambridgeshire.

== Career statistics ==
Appearances and goals by club, season and competition
Club	Season	League			FA Cup		Total	
Club	Season	Division	Apps	Goals	Apps	Goals	Apps	Goals
Leicester Fosse	1902–03	Second Division	33	0	2	0	35	0
Leicester Fosse	1903–04	Second Division	24	0	5	0	29	0
Leicester Fosse	1904–05	Second Division	2	0	0	0	2	0
Leicester Fosse	Total		59	0	7	0	66	0
Swindon Town	1905–06	Southern League First Division	33	0	1	0	50	0
Swindon Town	1906–07	Southern League First Division	37	0	1	0	38	0
Swindon Town	1907–08	Southern League First Division	30	0	4	0	34	0
Swindon Town	1908–09	Southern League First Division	40	0	1	0	41	0
Swindon Town	Total		140	0	7	0	147	0
Brentford	1909–10	Southern League First Division	41	0	2	0	43	0
Brentford	1910–11	Southern League First Division	38	2	1	0	39	2
Brentford	1911–12	Southern League First Division	32	0	3	0	35	0
Brentford	1912–13	Southern League First Division	1	0	0	0	1	0
Brentford	Total		112	2	6	0	118	2
Career total			311	2	20	0	331	2
