= Ted Price (footballer) =

English footballer

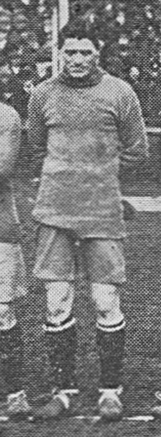
- Price lining up for Brentford in 1919.

Personal information
- Full name: Edward Price
- Date of birth: 13 June 1883
- Place of birth: Walsall, England
- Date of death: 29 December 1967 (aged 84)
- Place of death: Isleworth, England
- Height: 5 ft 9 1/2 in (1.77 m)
- Position: Goalkeeper

Senior career*
Years	Team	Apps	(Gls)
- Richmond Villa
- Royal Army Medical Corps
1906–1908	Aldershot Depot		
1908–1909	Walsall		
1909–1911	Stockport County	34	(0)
1911–1912	Croydon Common	18	(0)
1912–1920	Brentford	110	(0)
1917–1918	→ Wilkinsons (guest)		
1920–1921	Queens Park Rangers	7	(0)
- Brentford

International career
1919	Southern League XI	1	(0)
- * Club domestic league appearances and goals

Edward Price (13 June 1883 – 29 December 1967) was an English professional footballer who played in the Football League for Stockport County and Queens Park Rangers as a goalkeeper. He made over 100 Southern League appearances for Brentford and is a member of the club's Hall of Fame.

== Club career ==
=== Early years ===
A goalkeeper, Price began his career at Richmond Villa and played for the Medical Corps and Aldershot Depot representative teams while serving in the British Army. While with Aldershot, he won the 1907 cup for best all-round sportsman at the barracks. He returned to his native West Midlands to join hometown Birmingham & District League club Walsall in October 1908, staying with the club for ten months.

=== Stockport County ===
Price moved to the Football League in August 1909, when he signed for Second Division club Stockport County. He made just three appearances during 1909–10, but established himself in the first team the following season and made 34 appearances. Price departed the club at the end of the 1910–11 season and made 37 appearances during his two seasons at Edgeley Park.

=== Croydon Common ===
Pride moved to London and dropped back into non-League football to sign for Southern League Second Division club Croydon Common in 1911. He represented the team in both the Southern League and the London Combination and made 18 and 24 appearances respectively. Price left the club at the end of the 1911–12 season, having made 46 appearances for the Robins.

=== Brentford ===
Price joined Southern League First Division club Brentford in 1912. He had a poor 1912–13 season and conceded the goals which saw the Bees relegated to the Second Division. Price was a part of the Brentford team which challenged for promotion in the 1913–14 and 1914–15 seasons, before competitive football was suspended in 1915, due to the outbreak of the First World War. Price continued to play for Brentford through the war and during the 1917–18 season, he joined London Munitions League club Wilkinsons as a guest. He was a part of the Brentford team which won the 1918–19 London Combination title.

Price was awarded a testimonial against Millwall in September 1919 and with the resumption of competitive football, he returned to Southern League action for the 1919–20 season. Price departed Griffin Park in May 1920, after making 118 appearances in four competitive seasons for Brentford. He returned to Brentford in September 1921, but failed to make any further competitive appearances for the club. Price was posthumously inducted into the Brentford Hall of Fame in 2019.

=== Queens Park Rangers ===
Price returned to league football in May 1920, when he signed for Third Division club Queens Park Rangers. He made seven appearances during the 1920–21 season and departed Loftus Road in September 1921.

== Representative career ==
Price played for the Southern League representative team in a match against their Irish League counterparts in November 1919.

== Personal life ==
Price spent many years in the British Army and spent five years in South Africa with the South Staffordshire Regiment. He served in the Boer War and won the Queen's South Africa Medal. After suffering an injury, he transferred to the Army Medical Corps. After leaving the army, Price settled in Isleworth. He was rejected for active service in the First World War.

== Career statistics ==
Appearances and goals by club, season and competition
Club	Season	League			FA Cup		Total	
Club	Season	Division	Apps	Goals	Apps	Goals	Apps	Goals
Stockport County	1909–10	Second Division	3	0	0	0	0	0
Stockport County	1910–11	Second Division	31	0	3	0	34	0
Stockport County	Total		34	0	3	0	37	0
Croydon Common	1911–12	Southern League Second Division	18	0	4	0	22	0
Brentford	1912–13	Southern League First Division	37	0	2	0	39	0
Brentford	1913–14	Southern League Second Division	30	0	3	0	33	0
Brentford	1914–15	Southern League Second Division	22	0	3	0	25	0
Brentford	1919–20	Southern League First Division	21	0	0	0	21	0
Brentford	Total		110	0	8	0	118	0
Queens Park Rangers	1920–21	Third Division	7	0	0	0	7	0
Career total			169	0	15	0	184	0

== Honours ==
Brentford

- London Combination: 1918–19

Individual

- Brentford Hall of Fame
