= Dusty Rhodes (footballer) =

English footballer

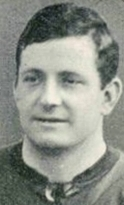
- Rhodes with Brentford in 1911.

Personal information
- Full name: Ephraim Rhodes
- Date of birth: 16 August 1882
- Place of birth: South Bank, England
- Date of death: 30 September 1960 (aged 78)
- Place of death: Hounslow, England
- Position: Full back

Senior career*
Years	Team	Apps	(Gls)
–1901	South Bank		
1901–1902	Grangetown Athletic		
1902–1908	Sunderland	115	(5)
1908–1919	Brentford	206	(2)

Managerial career
- 1912–1915: Brentford (player-manager)
- * Club domestic league appearances and goals

Ephraim Rhodes (16 August 1882 – 30 September 1960) was an English professional footballer and manager who played in the Football League for Sunderland in the early 20th century. He also played for and managed Brentford in the Southern League and was posthumously inducted into the club's Hall of Fame in May 2015.

== Playing career ==
=== Sunderland ===
Born in South Bank, North Yorkshire, Rhodes began his career in his hometown at Northern League club South Bank. He moved to divisional rivals Grangetown Athletic in 1901 and finished runners-up in the Northern League during the 1901–02 season. Rhodes' performances earned him a move to reigning Football League First Division champions Sunderland in May 1902. He made only five appearances during the 1902–03 season, but slowly forced his way into the team during the 1903–04 season, making 16 appearances. Rhodes was a regular during the 1904–05 season, making 28 appearances and scoring a penalty to register his first goal for the club. He made 24 appearances and scored another penalty during the 1905–06 season. Rhodes was a virtual ever-present during the 1906–07 season, making 39 appearances and scoring two goals. 1907–08 would be Rhodes' final season with Sunderland, in which he made only eight appearances, but he scored his only goal for the club from open play. He made 120 appearances and scored five goals in a six-season spell with the Rokerites.

=== Brentford ===
Rhodes moved to London to join Southern League First Division club Brentford in July 1908. Under manager Fred Halliday, he won the Southern Professional Charity Cup during his debut season, the first silverware of his career. Including wartime matches, Rhodes made almost 400 appearances for the Griffin Park club. He re-registered as a player for the first post-war season of competitive football in September 1919, but did not make an appearance and subsequently retired as a player.

== Coaching and managerial career ==
Rhodes became player-manager of Brentford in November 1912, following the departure of Fred Halliday. His tenure got off to a bad start, with relegation to the Southern League Second Division at the end of the 1912–13 season. He relinquished his duties at the end of the 1914–15 season. He managed the Bees in 87 games, winning 38, drawing 19 and losing 30. Rhodes returned to Brentford as trainer in 1922 and served until 1925.

== Personal life ==
Rhodes married Daisy Caroline Shinner in 1904 and they had three children. He served in the Royal Army Pay Corps (Royal Fusiliers) during the First World War. Rhodes' younger brother Ernie was also a footballer and the pair played together at Grangetown Athletic and Sunderland. Following his time at Brentford, Rhodes became a supporter of the club.

== Career statistics ==
Appearances and goals by club, season and competition
Club	Season	League			FA Cup		Total	
Club	Season	Division	Apps	Goals	Apps	Goals	Apps	Goals
Sunderland	1902–03	First Division	5	0	0	0	5	0
Sunderland	1903–04	First Division	15	0	1	0	16	0
Sunderland	1904–05	First Division	28	1	0	0	28	1
Sunderland	1905–06	First Division	24	1	0	0	24	1
Sunderland	1906–07	First Division	35	2	4	0	39	2
Sunderland	1907–08	First Division	8	1	0	0	8	1
Sunderland	Total		115	5	5	0	120	5
Brentford	1908–09	Southern League First Division	32	0	2	0	34	0
Brentford	1909–10	Southern League First Division	34	2	2	0	36	2
Brentford	1910–11	Southern League First Division	33	0	1	0	34	0
Brentford	1911–12	Southern League First Division	29	0	5	0	34	0
Brentford	1912–13	Southern League First Division	33	0	0	0	33	0
Brentford	1913–14	Southern League Second Division	23	0	3	0	26	0
Brentford	1914–15	Southern League Second Division	22	0	2	0	24	0
Brentford	Total		206	2	15	0	221	2
Career total			321	7	20	0	341	7

== Managerial statistics ==
Managerial record by team and tenure
Team	From	To	Record					Ref
Team	From	To	P	W	D	L	Win %	Ref
Brentford	14 November 1912	April 1915	87	38	19	30	43.7	
Total			87	38	19	30	43.7	

== Honours ==
Brentford

- Southern Professional Charity Cup: 1908–09
- London Combination: 1918–19

Individual

- Brentford Hall of Fame
