= Geordie Reid =

Scottish footballer

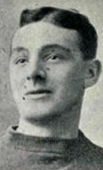

Personal information
- Date of birth: 30 January 1882
- Place of birth: Paisley, Scotland
- Date of death: 8 September 1960 (aged 78)
- Place of death: Paisley, Scotland
- Position: Forward

Senior career*
Years	Team	Apps	(Gls)
1902–1905	St Mirren	24	(7)
1905–1908	Middlesbrough	24	(6)
1908	Bradford Park Avenue	5	(0)
1908–1911	Brentford	102	(58)
1911–1913	Clyde	19	(7)
1913–1914	Johnstone	11	(3)
1914–1915	Clydebank	19	(6)

International career
1910	Southern League XI	2	(2)
- * Club domestic league appearances and goals

George T. Reid (30 January 1882 – 8 September 1960) was a Scottish professional football inside left and centre forward who played in the Football League for Middlesbrough and Bradford Park Avenue. He is best remembered for his time in the Southern League with Brentford, for whom he scored 58 goals in 102 league appearances. He represented the Southern League XI and scored in victories over the Scottish League XI and the Football League XI in 1910.

== Personal life ==
Reid was married and had two sons.

== Career statistics ==
Appearances and goals by club, season and competition
Club	Season	League			National Cup		Total	
Club	Season	Division	Apps	Goals	Apps	Goals	Apps	Goals
St Mirren	1902–03	Scottish League Division One	1	0	0	0	1	0
St Mirren	1903–04	Scottish League Division One	15	4	1	0	16	4
St Mirren	1904–05	Scottish League Division One	8	3	3	3	11	6
St Mirren	Total		24	7	4	3	28	10
Middlesbrough	1905–06	First Division	24	6	2	0	26	6
Brentford	1908–09	Southern League First Division	24	18	—		24	18
Brentford	1909–10	Southern League First Division	39	15	2	2	41	17
Brentford	1910–11	Southern League First Division	35	21	1	0	36	21
Brentford	1911–12	Southern League First Division	4	3	—		4	3
Brentford	Total		102	58	3	2	105	60
Clyde	1911–12	Scottish League Division One	4	1	0	0	4	1
Clyde	1912–13	Scottish League Division One	15	6	6	3	21	9
Clyde	Total		19	7	6	3	25	10
Johnstone	1913–14	Scottish League Division Two	11	3	1	0	12	3
Clydebank	1914–15	Scottish League Division Two	19	6	—		19	6
Career total			199	87	16	8	215	95
