= Jack Sibbald =

English footballer

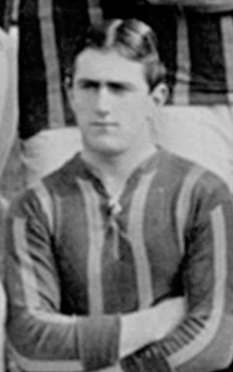
- Sibbald while with Brentford in 1912.

Personal information
- Full name: John Patrick Sibbald
- Date of birth: 12 September 1890
- Place of birth: Wallsend, England
- Date of death: 20 August 1956 (aged 65)
- Place of death: Newcastle upon Tyne, England
- Height: 5 ft 7 in (1.70 m)
- Position: Forward

Senior career*
Years	Team	Apps	(Gls)
1907–1908	Walker St. Christopher		
1908–1909	Wallsend Elm Villa		
1910–1913	Brentford	82	(21)
1913–1914	Wallsend		
1914–1920	Blackpool	59	(13)
1920	Wallsend		
1920–2921	West Stanley		
1921–1922	Blackpool	15	(2)
1922–1924	Southport	69	(16)
1924–1925	Walsall	39	(12)
1927	Wallsend		
- * Club domestic league appearances and goals

John Patrick Sibbald (12 September 1890 – 20 August 1956) was an English professional footballer who played as a forward in the Football League for Blackpool, Southport and Walsall.

== Career statistics ==
Appearances and goals by club, season and competition
Club	Season	League			FA Cup		Other		Total	
Club	Season	Division	Apps	Goals	Apps	Goals	Apps	Goals	Apps	Goals
Brentford	1909–10	Southern League First Division	1	1	—		—		1	1
Brentford	1910–11	Southern League First Division	29	5	0	0	—		29	5
Brentford	1911–12	Southern League First Division	29	12	4	0	—		33	12
Brentford	1912–13	Southern League First Division	23	3	2	0	—		25	3
Brentford	Total		82	21	6	0	—		88	21
Blackpool	1914–15	Second Division	27	7	1	1	—		28	8
Southport	1922–23	Third Division North	28	3	1	0	1 (Note: Appearance(s) in Lancashire Senior Cup)	1	30	4
Southport	1923–24	Third Division North	41	13	4	0	2	0	47	13
Southport	Total		69	16	5	0	3	1	77	17
Career total			178	44	12	1	3	1	193	46
