= George Kennedy (Scottish footballer) =

Scottish footballer

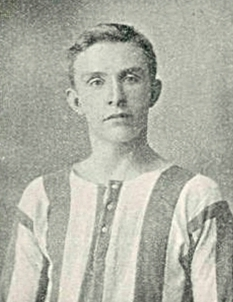
- Kennedy while with Brentford in 1911.

Personal information
- Full name: George William Kennedy
- Date of birth: 12 March 1882
- Place of birth: Dumfries, Scotland
- Date of death: 16 November 1917 (aged 35)
- Place of death: Passchendaele salient, Belgium
- Position: Half back

Senior career*
Years	Team	Apps	(Gls)
- Maxwelltown Volunteers
1906–1908	Lincoln City	42	(0)
1908–1909	Chelsea	10	(0)
1910–1913	Brentford	73	(2)
1913–1914	Dumfries		
- * Club domestic league appearances and goals

George William Kennedy DCM MM (12 March 1882 – 16 November 1917) was a Scottish footballer. He played at left half or centre half.

== Career ==
He began his career in his native Dumfries with Maxwelltown Volunteers.

He then made 45 appearances over two seasons playing for Lincoln City, making the move along with Norrie Fairgray and George Nisbet. Under David Calderhead, Lincoln pulled off an FA Cup upset when a goal by Fairgray knocked out Chelsea 1–0 in a replay. Calderhead became Chelsea manager soon after and took Fairgray with him. Kennedy followed a year later.

Kennedy spent the years in the lead up to World War I playing for another team in West London, then-Southern League club, Brentford. George left Brentford at the end of the 1912–13 season, returning to Dumfries for the following season.

== Personal life ==
George Kennedy emigrated to Canada in June 1914. Sailing from Glasgow to Montreal on board the SS Grampian.

== War service ==
Private 418239 G.W. Kennedy enlisted in the 42nd Battalion (Royal Highlanders Regiment) of the Canadian Infantry in March 1915 and was sent to France with the Canadian Expeditionary Force (CEF). He would subsequently be awarded both the Military Medal and Distinguished Conduct Medal for gallantry, and was also Mentioned in Despatches.

Having risen to the rank of Company Sergeant Major (CSM), Kennedy was wounded during the Third Battle of Ypres and subsequently died from his injuries on 16 November 1917. He was 35 years old.

CSM 418239 G. Kennedy is now buried at Lijssenthoek Military Cemetery, located 12 km west of Ypres close to the town of Poperinge.

== Career statistics ==
Appearances and goals by club, season and competition
Club	Season	League			FA Cup		Total	
Club	Season	Division	Apps	Goals	Apps	Goals	Apps	Goals
Lincoln City	1906–07	Second Division	25	0	3	0	28	0
Lincoln City	1907–08	Second Division	17	0	0	0	17	0
Lincoln City	Total		42	0	3	0	45	0
Chelsea	1908–09	First Division	10	0	2	0	12	0
Brentford	1910–11	Southern League First Division	22	2	1	0	23	2
Brentford	1911–12	Southern League First Division	28	0	4	0	32	0
Brentford	1912–13	Southern League First Division	23	0	0	0	23	0
Brentford	Total		73	2	5	0	78	2
Career total			125	2	10	0	135	2
