= Alf Walker (footballer) =

English footballer (1884–1961)

- Walker in a Port Vale team photo.

Personal information
- Full name: Alfred Samuel Walker
- Date of birth: 26 August 1884
- Place of birth: Upper Holloway, England
- Date of death: 14 September 1961 (aged 77)
- Place of death: Newcastle-under-Lyme, England
- Position: Outside left

Youth career
- Wolverton

Senior career*
Years	Team	Apps	(Gls)
1906–1907	Northampton Town		
1907–1909	Leyton		
1909–1910	Brentford	14	(3)
1910–1911	Wolverhampton Wanderers	32	(2)
1911–1914	Port Vale	71	(7)
- Dunfermline Athletic
Total		103+	(9+)
- * Club domestic league appearances and goals

Alfred Samuel Walker (26 August 1884 – 14 September 1961) was an English footballer who played in the Football League for Wolverhampton Wanderers.

== Career ==
Walker played for Wolverton, Northampton Town and Brentford, before joining Wolverhampton Wanderers for a £150 fee in April 1910. He scored twice 35 games for the club, as they posted eighth and ninth places finishes in the Football League Second Division in 1909–10 and 1910–11. He joined non-League Port Vale in 1911 and enjoyed regular football in Burslem, helping the club to lift the Birmingham Senior Cup in 1913. However, he lost his place in October 1913 and after colliding with low railings at the Old Recreation Ground on 26 January 1914 was out of action for some time. He was released at the end of the season and moved on to Scottish side Dunfermline Athletic.

== Later life ==
By 1949, Walker was working as the managing director of Sanitary Supply Co Ltd in Burslem.

== Career statistics ==
Appearances and goals by club, season and competition
Club	Season	League			FA Cup		Total	
Club	Season	Division	Apps	Goals	Apps	Goals	Apps	Goals
Brentford	1909–10	Southern League First Division	14	3	0	0	14	3
Wolverhampton Wanderers	1909–10	Second Division	1	0	0	0	1	0
Wolverhampton Wanderers	1910–11	Second Division	31	2	3	0	34	2
Wolverhampton Wanderers	Total		32	2	3	0	35	2
Port Vale	1911–12	Central League	23	1	0	0	0	0
Port Vale	1912–13	Central League	33	6	4	1	37	7
Port Vale	1913–14	Central League	15	0	1	0	16	0
Port Vale	Total		71	7	5	1	76	8

== Honours ==
Port Vale

- Birmingham Senior Cup: 1913
