= Bill McCafferty =

Scottish footballer

Personal information
- Full name: William McCafferty
- Date of birth: 9 December 1882
- Place of birth: Rutherglen, Scotland
- Date of death: 17 April 1929 (aged 46)
- Place of death: Rutherglen, Scotland
- Position: Forward

Senior career*
Years	Team	Apps	(Gls)
1900–1902	Rutherglen Glencairn		
1902–1903	Celtic	1	(0)
1902–1903	→ Bolton Wanderers (loan)	8	(0)
1903–1904	Stenhousemuir		
1904–1905	Dunfermline Athletic		
1905	Bathgate		
1905–1906	Reading		
1906–1907	Birmingham	4	(0)
1907	Bathgate		
1907–1909	Portsmouth		
1909–1910	Brentford	16	(3)
- Bathgate
- * Club domestic league appearances and goals

William McCafferty (9 December 1882 – 17 April 1929) was a Scottish professional footballer who played in the Scottish Football League for Celtic and in the Football League for Bolton Wanderers and Birmingham. He played as a forward.

== Career ==
McCafferty was born in Rutherglen, which was then in Lanarkshire. He played for junior club Rutherglen Glencairn before signing for Celtic in March 1902. He made his first team debut on the losing side in the 1902 Scottish Cup Final, and played once in the Scottish League, in October 1902 in a 1–1 home draw with Rangers, before joining English club Bolton Wanderers on loan the following month. McCafferty went back to Scotland to play for Stenhousemuir and Bathgate before returning to England for a season in the Southern League with Reading. In December 1906, First Division club Birmingham signed McCafferty for the value of the gate receipts from a friendly between buying and selling club, which amounted to £350 (£37,000 today).. The player scored in that friendly, but failed to score in competitive play for Birmingham, as he could not dislodge Benny Green from the side. McCafferty went on to play for Southern League clubs Portsmouth and Brentford between further spells at Bathgate.

McCafferty died while at work in Rutherglen in 1929.
