= Albert Bartlett (footballer) =

English footballer

Personal information
- Full name: Albert Burdon Bartlett
- Date of birth: 10 April 1884
- Place of birth: Morpeth, England
- Date of death: 1969 (aged 84–85)
- Place of death: Bradford, England
- Positions: Outside right; inside right

Senior career*
Years	Team	Apps	(Gls)
- Morpeth Harriers
1906–1909	Bradford City	52	(18)
1909–1911	Brentford	71	(7)
1911	Reading	1	(0)
1911–1919	Bradford City	0	(0)
- Heckmondwike
- Halifax Town
- Castleford Town
Total		124	(25)
- * Club domestic league appearances and goals

Albert Burdon Bartlett (10 April 1884 – 1969) was an English professional footballer who played as a forward.

== Career ==
Born in Morpeth, Bartlett played for Morpeth Harriers, Bradford City, Brentford, Reading, and Castleford Town.

He initially signed for Bradford City from Morpeth Harriers in July 1906, leaving to sign for Brentford in May 1909. He had a second spell with the club between May 1911 and 1919, when he left for Castleford Town. For Bradford City, he made 52 appearances in the Football League, scoring 18 goals; he also scored one goal in four FA Cup appearances, all of which came in his first spell with the club.

For Brentford, he made 71 appearances in the league, scoring seven goals.

For Reading he made one appearance in the league.

== Sources ==
- Frost, Terry (1988). Bradford City A Complete Record 1903-1988. Breedon Books. ISBN 0907969380.
- Joyce, Michael (2012). Football League Players' Records 1888 to 1939. Nottingham: Tony Brown. ISBN 978-1905891610.
- Sedunary, Alan (2008). The Little Book of Reading FC'. Breedon Books. ISBN 978-1859836583.
- White, Eric (1989). 100 Years of Brentford. Brentford F.C. ISBN 0951526200.
