= Jock Hamilton (footballer, born 1879) =

Scottish footballer

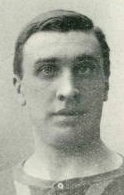
- Hamilton while with Brentford in 1911.

Personal information
- Date of birth: 28 February 1879
- Place of birth: Bonnyton, Scotland
- Date of death: 17 April 1925 (aged 46)
- Place of death: Leith, Scotland
- Position: Centre half

Senior career*
Years	Team	Apps	(Gls)
–1903	Lochgelly United		
1903–1904	Cowdenbeath		
1904–1905	Dunfermline Athletic		
1905–1907	Leith Athletic	40	(0)
1907–1908	Brentford	22	(0)
1908–1909	Leeds City	21	(0)
1909–1912	Brentford	87	(1)
1912–1914	Swansea Town		
1914–1915	Barry		
- * Club domestic league appearances and goals

John H. Hamilton MM (28 February 1879 – 17 April 1925) was a Scottish professional footballer who made over 100 appearances in the Southern League for Brentford as a centre half. He also played in the Scottish League and Football League for Leith Athletic and Leeds City respectively.

== Personal life ==
While a player with Swansea Town, Hamilton worked on the Swansea docks. Hamilton served in the Argyll and Sutherland Highlanders and the Machine Gun Corps during the First World War and saw action in Mesopotamia. He won the Military Medal during the course of his service.

== Career statistics ==
Appearances and goals by club, season and competition
Club	Season	League			National cup (Note: Includes Scottish Cup, FA Cup)		Total	
Club	Season	Division	Apps	Goals	Apps	Goals	Apps	Goals
Leith Athletic	1904–05	Scottish League Division Two	1	0	0	0	1	0
Leith Athletic	1905–06	Scottish League Division Two	19	0	9	0	28	0
Leith Athletic	1906–07	Scottish League Division Two	20	0	3	0	23	0
Leith Athletic	Total		40	0	12	0	52	0
Brentford	1907–08	Southern League First Division	22	0	2	0	24	0
Leeds City	1908–09	Second Division	21	0	4	0	25	0
Brentford	1909–10	Southern League First Division	28	0	2	0	30	0
Brentford	1910–11	Southern League First Division	37	1	1	0	38	1
Brentford	1911–12	Southern League First Division	22	0	5	0	27	0
Brentford	Total		109	1	10	0	119	1
Career total			170	1	26	0	196	1

== Honours ==
Swansea Town

- Welsh Cup: 1912–13
