= Steve Buxton (footballer, born 1888) =

English footballer

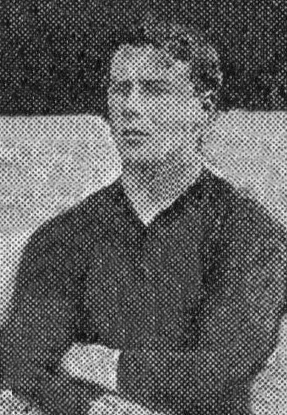
- Buxton with Brentford in 1909

Personal information
- Full name: Stephen Buxton
- Date of birth: 3 February 1888
- Place of birth: South Bank, England
- Date of death: 21 April 1953 (aged 65)
- Place of death: South Bank, England
- Height: 5 ft 9 in (1.75 m)
- Position: Left back

Senior career*
Years	Team	Apps	(Gls)
–1908	South Bank		
1908–1911	Brentford	101	(4)
1911–1913	Oldham Athletic	27	(0)
1913–	Darlington		
1919–1920	Blyth Spartans		
1920–1922	Ashington	24	(1)
1922–1924	Workington		
- South Bank Gasworks
- * Club domestic league appearances and goals

Stephen Buxton (3 February 1888 – 21 April 1953) was an English professional footballer who played as a left back in the Football League for Oldham Athletic and Ashington. He made over 100 Southern League appearances for Brentford and represented the London XI.

== Career statistics ==
Appearances and goals by club, season and competition
Club	Season	League			FA Cup		Total	
Club	Season	Division	Apps	Goals	Apps	Goals	Apps	Goals
Brentford	1908–09	Southern League First Division	25	4	2	0	27	4
Brentford	1909–10	Southern League First Division	38	0	2	0	40	0
Brentford	1910–11	Southern League First Division	38	0	1	0	39	0
Brentford	Total		101	4	5	0	106	4
Oldham Athletic	1911–12	First Division	23	0	0	0	23	0
Oldham Athletic	1912–13	First Division	4	0	0	0	4	0
Oldham Athletic	Total		27	0	0	0	27	0
Career total			128	4	5	0	133	4
