= Tidswell =

Tidswell is a surname. Notable people with the surname include:

- Charlotte Tidswell (c. 1760–1846), English actress
- Frank Tidswell (1867–1941), Australian physician
- Quinton Tidswell (1910–1991), Australian artist
- Thomas Tidswell (1870–1950), Australian architect

== See also ==
- Tideswell, village and parish in England
- Tidwell, surname page
