= Tennessee House of Representatives 74th district =

State legislative district in Tennessee

Tennessee's 74th State House of Representatives district
- Map of Tennessee House districts with the 74th District shaded in red
Representative
Jay Reedy; R–Erin
since 2019
- Demographics: 90.3% White; 1.8% Black; 2.7% Hispanic; 0.6% Asian; 4% Multiracial
- Population (2024): 68,772

The Tennessee House of Representatives 74th district is one of the 99 legislative districts in the lower house of the Tennessee General Assembly. The district is located in Middle Tennessee and covers all of Benton, Houston, Humphreys, Stewart and the south and east of Henry counties. The district includes Dover, Erin, Waverly, New Johnsonville, Camden and most of Paris. Jay Reedy has represented the district since 2015.

== Demographics ==
The Tennessee Comptroller estimates the population as of 2024 at 68,772.

- 86.3% of the district is White
- 2.7% of the district is Hispanic
- 1.8% of the district is Black
- 0.6% of the district is Asian
- 0.3% of the district is some other race alone
- 4% of the district is Two or more races

Detailed demographic information is also available through Census Reporter.

== History ==
The 88th Tennessee General Assembly was the first in which all districts were numbered. At this time, the 74th district was in Benton, Henry, and Stewart counties. From the 89th-90th GAs, it also included Carrol and Humphreys counties, while Henry county was excluded. From the 91st-92nd GAs, it was made up of Benton, Carroll, Humpreys, and Stewart counties. During the 93rd GA, Decatur County was included. From the 94th-97th GAs, it was made up of Houston, Humphreys, Benton, and Stewart counties. During the 98th GA, it was made up of Decatur, Houston, Humphreys, Perry, Stewart, and Wayne counties. From the 99th-102nd GAs, it was made up of Benton, Humphreys, Perry, and parts of Decatur and Wayne counties. From the 103rd-107th GAs, it was made up of Houston, Humphreys, Perry, and parts of Hickman and Maury counties. From the 108th-112th GAs, it was made up of Houston, Humphreys, Perry, and part of Montgomery counties. Since the 113th GA, it has been made up of Benton, Houston, Humphreys, Stewart, and part of Henry counties.

== List of Representatives ==
Representative	Party	Years of Service	General Assembly	Hometown
Jay Reedy	Republican	2015-present	109th-114th	Erin
John Tidwell	Democratic	1997-2014	100th-108th	New Johnsonville
James L. Peach Sr.	Republican	1995-1996	99th	Camden
William H. Collier	Democratic	1985-1994	94th-98th	Waverly
W.C. Herndon Jr.	Democratic	1983-1984	93rd	Camden
Frank P. Lashlee	Democratic	1973-1982	88th-92nd	Camden
