= Tidwell =

Tidwell is a surname. Notable people with the surname include:

- Bill Tidwell (1932–2023), American sports administrator and coach
- Blade Tidwell (born 2001), American baseball player
- Charlie Tidwell (1937–1969), American athlete
- Cortney Tidwell (born 1972), American singer-songwriter
- Danny Tidwell (1984–2020), American dancer
- George Ernest Tidwell (1931–2011), American judge
- John Tidwell (basketball), American basketball player
- John Tidwell (politician) (born 1941), American politician
- Larry Tidwell (born 1953), American basketball coach
- Monica Tidwell (born 1954), American model
- Moody R. Tidwell III (1939–2026), American judge
- Thomas Tidwell (born 1953), American forester
- Travis Tidwell (1929–2004), American football player

== See also ==
- Tidwell Field, Texas
- Tidwell Prairie, Texas
