= Lashlee =

Lashlee is a surname. Notable people with the surname include:

- Frank P. Lashlee (1937–2008), American politician
- Rhett Lashlee (born 1983), American football coach
