= John Tidwell =

John Tidwell may refer to:

- John Tidwell (basketball)
- John Tidwell (politician)
