= Quinton Tidswell =

Australian artist (1910–1991)

- Born: 11 May 1910; Randwick, New South Wales
- Died: 8 May 1991 (aged 80); Wangaratta, Victoria
- Education: Mosman Prep; Newington College; Sydney Grammar; Sydney Art School; East Sydney Technical College
- Known for: Etching & works on paper
- Parents: Thomas Tidswell (father); Elsie Winifred Tidswell née Robinson (mother)
- Relatives: Dr Frank Tidswell Uncle

Quinton Tidswell (11 May 1910 – 8 May 1991) was a New South Wales–born Australian artist who was known for his etchings and works on paper. For many years Tidswell was a resident of the state of Victoria and the Castlemaine Art Museum hold a selection of his work. The National Gallery of Australia hold fourteen of his works. His father was an architect working in Sydney and Tidswell’s important works on paper are often of now demolished architecture in and around Macquarie Street, Sydney and of the historic and early settlement of Windsor, New South Wales.

== Birth and family ==
Tidswell was born in Randwick, New South Wales, the fifth pregnancy of Elsie Winifred Tidswell (née Robinson) to her husband Thomas Tidswell. A fourth child was stillborn hence the fifth child received the name Quinton. His father was at the time of his birth a prosperous and self-employed architect working from Challis House in Martin Place, Sydney. His extended family were well known in the Eastern Suburbs of Sydney where they owned the mansion Nugal Hall in Randwick and the popular seaside Coogee Bay Hotel at Googee Beach. He was the nephew of the renowned physician Frank Tidswell.

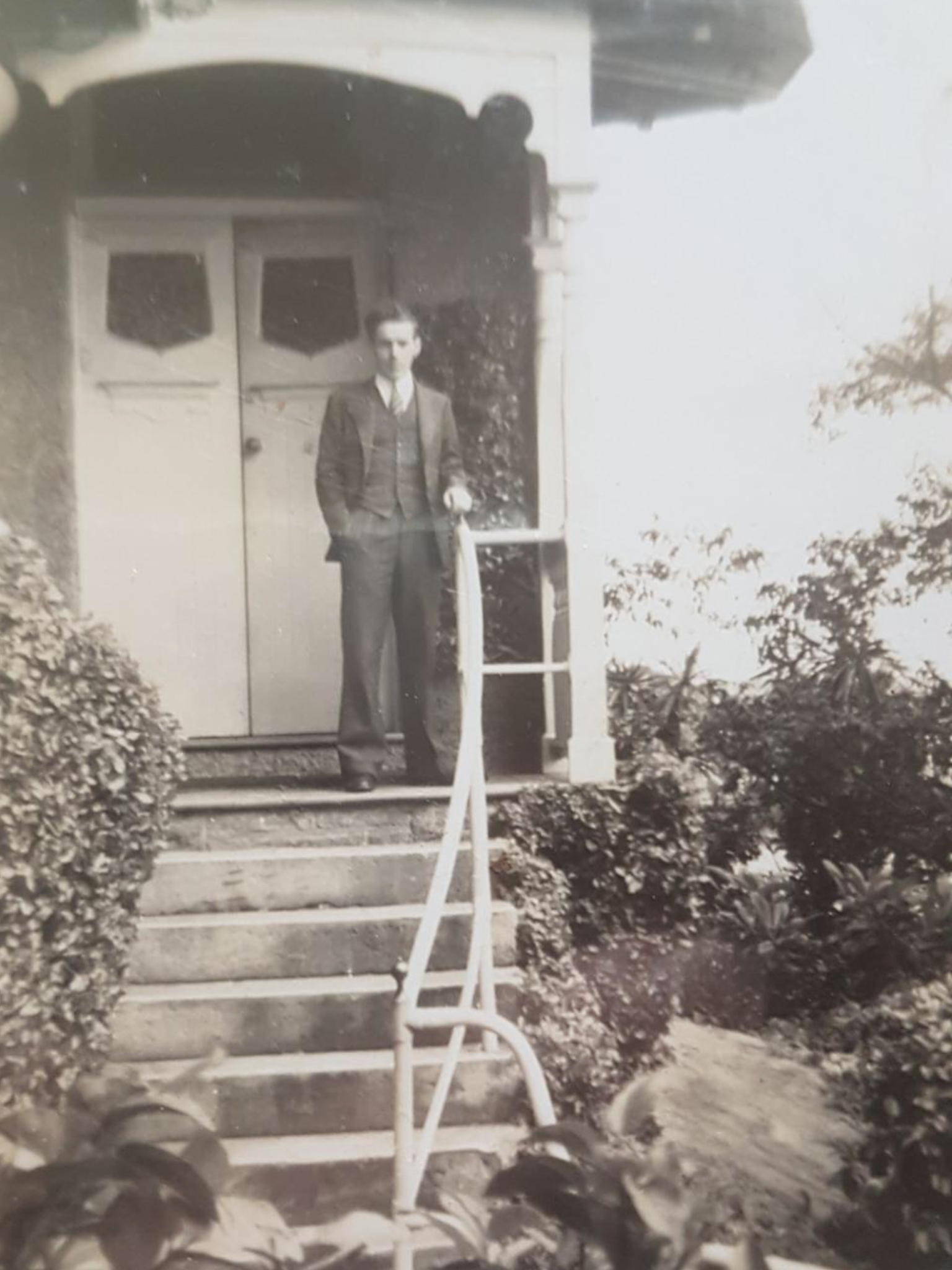
Tidswell as a student at the entrance of his family home 29 Musgrave Street, Mosman

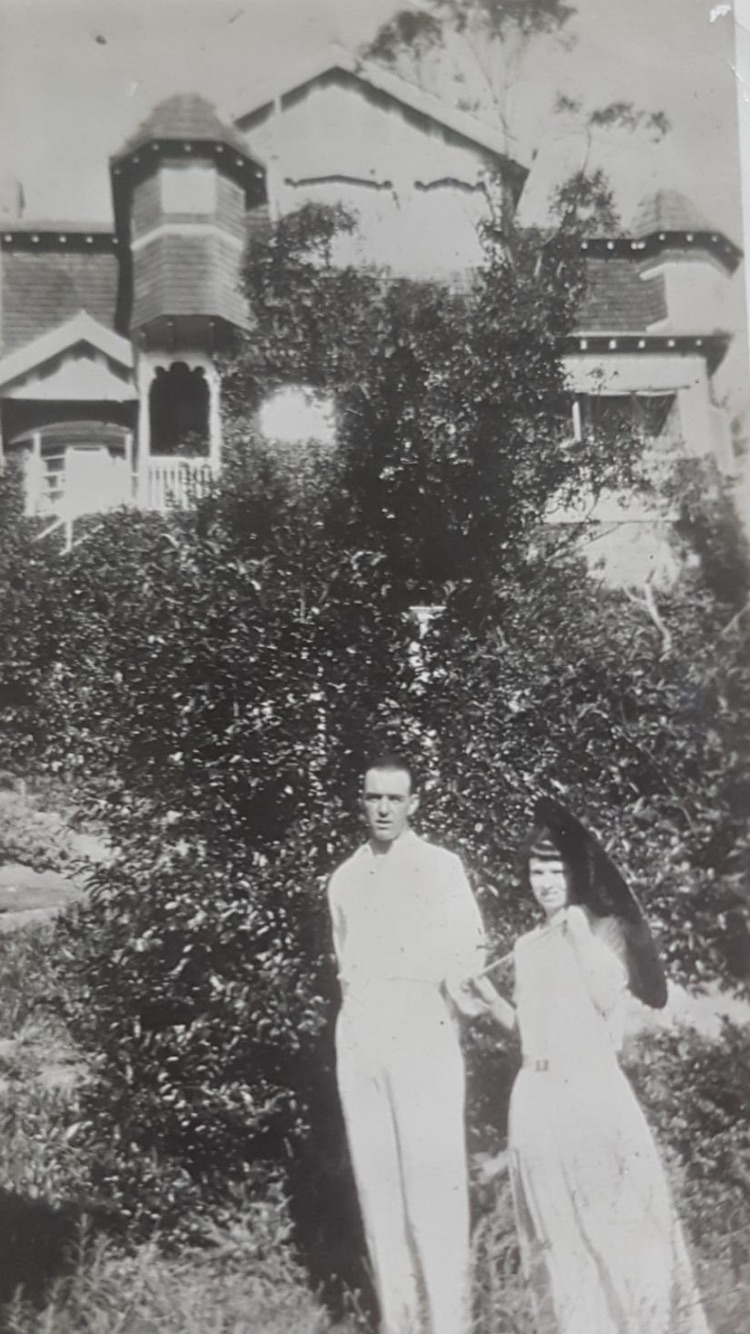
Tidswell and Jean Bellette in front of 29 Musgrave Street, Mosman, designed by his father Thomas Tidswell

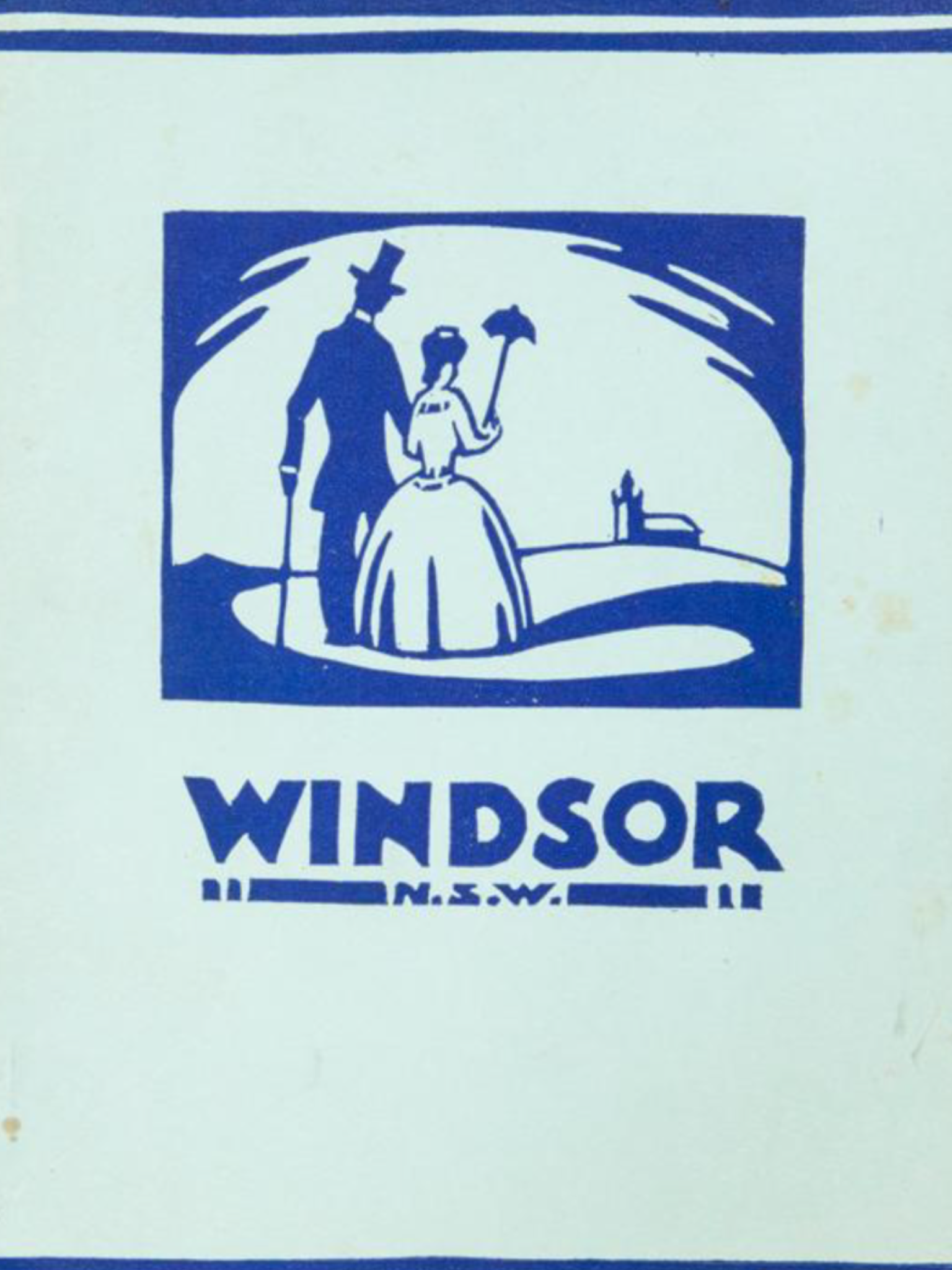
Tidswell published a collection of etchings of Windsor NSW in 1932

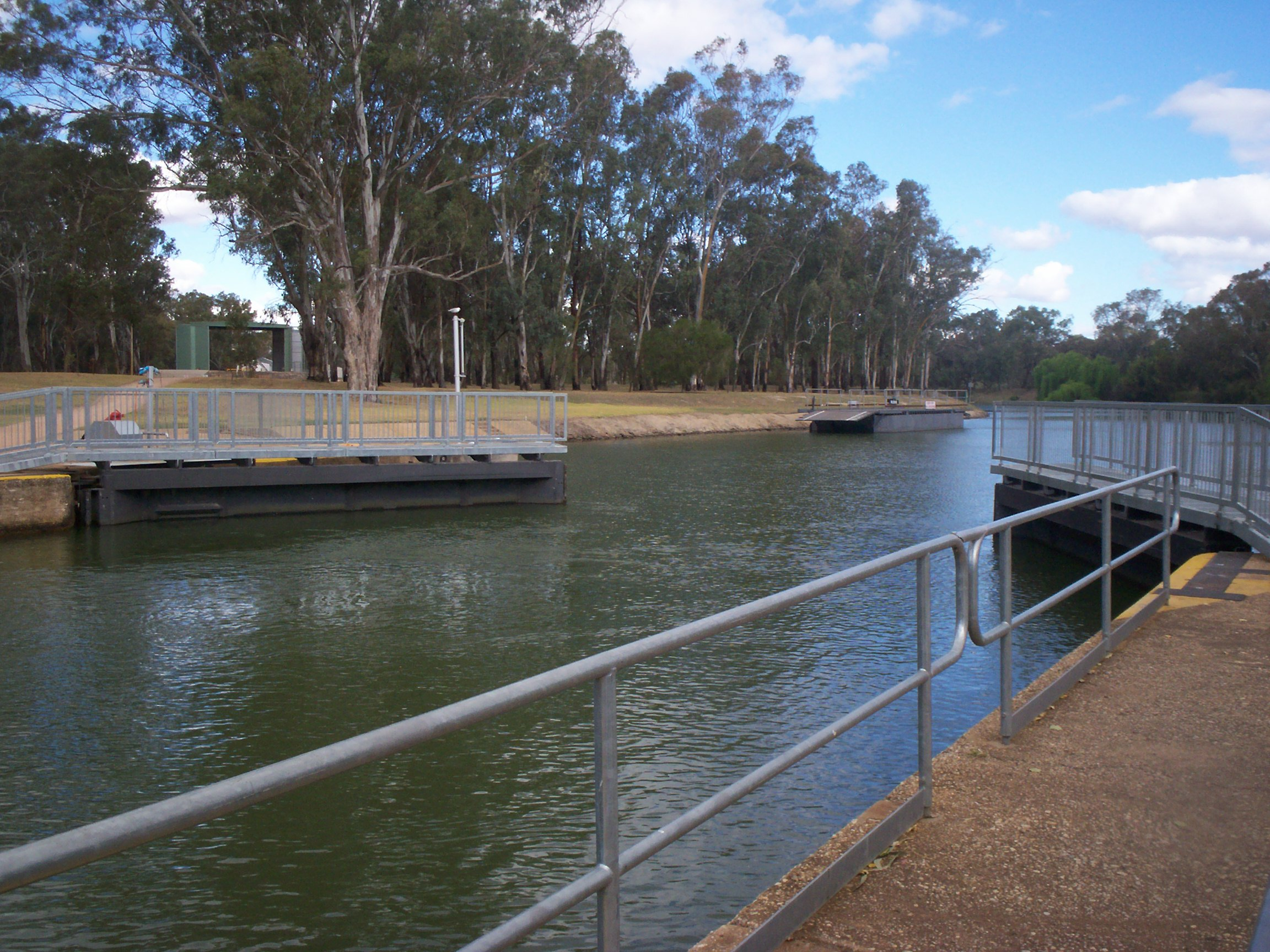
Lock 11 Mildura

Although Tidswell's birth is registered in Randwick his brothers were all home births so he might have been born at the family hotel in Coogee. At the time of his birth his parents lived at 29 Musgrave Street, Mosman. The home, designed by his father, still stands overlooking Sydney Harbour. His three older brothers were Frank born in 1896, Noel born in 1897 and Squire born in 1900. Frank and Noel both served in World War I where Noel was killed in action in 1918. In 1931 during a flash flood Elsie Tidswell and her third son Squire were swept away in the Minnamurra River at Jamberoo and Mrs Tidswell died. The District Coroner returned a verdict of accidental death by drowning. Thomas Tidswell retired at 40 and lived as a widower until 1950.

== Education ==
As with his older siblings Frank and Noel, Tidswell was educated at Mosman Church of England Preparatory School. He entered the school in June 1918 and left in December 1922. He then attended his father's Alma Mater Newington College in 1923 and 1924. Members of the Tidswell family attended Newington from the 1880s until the 1970s. Little is recorded in the school annual of Newington College known as The Newingtonian about his time at the college. Although Tidswell was a good sportsman the GPS sporting competitions of the era did not include tennis or swimming and so his usual sports were not available at the college. Outside of school sport he is known to have competed in the Northern Suburbs Ping Pong Tournament which was held locally at the Mosman Memorial Hall. For tennis on asphalt and grass courts he used the Mosman Recreation Club where the Tidswell family were foundation members. His father designed the pavilion at the club in 1901 and its replacement in 1916 as Honorary Architect. Tidswell attended Sydney Grammar School from February 1925 until December 1927 and passed his Leaving Certificate in 1927. He also received the William Shepherd Laidley English Essay Prize in Sixth Form at Grammar in 1927. After completing his schooling, at his father's insistence, Tidswell was articled to the Sydney law firm Colquhoun & King. Percy Colquhoun was a family friend, fellow Mosman resident, Old Newingtonian and senior partner of the firm. Tidswell did not enjoy the law but won a scholarship to study under Julian Ashton at the Sydney Art School and so commenced his art studies. In 1931 at East Sydney Technical College, which was housed in the old Darlinghurst Gaol in Darlinghurst, Tidswell topped his year in the advanced etching course. His etching teacher was the well known artist and etcher Frederick C. Briton. East Sydney is now known as the National Art School.

== Art works ==
In 1932 Tidswell published a collection of lino-cut decorations of some of the oldest buildings in the historic township of Windsor, New South Wales. It was a limited edition of 250 and copies are now held by the State Library of Queensland, the State Library of New South Wales and the National Library of Australia. Another publication from this time is Sydney of Yesterday featuring ten drypoint engravings. This book of engravings featured a foreword by his childhood Sydney friend Thomas James Dunbabin DSO (1911–55) who became a distinguished classicist and archaeologist and served as a member of the British Intelligence Corps during World War II. Tidswell's etchings, and those of fellow Old Newingtonian Hardy Wilson, of historic Sydney buildings such as Burdekin House feature figures in quasi-Georgian costume. In works such as Old Philip Street Sydney and Lewisham Loan Office figures are clad in more contemporary dress. In 1934, in a review in the Sydney Morning Herald of the Australian Art Society in their exhibition at the Education Department Gallery, the reviewer comments on a gratifying feature of the exhibition. “It is the chance it gives to see some younger artists. One of these is Quinton Tidswell. Everything that this painter shows, whether oil, watercolour, drypoint, or lino-cut, betokens a skilful command of the medium, a fineness of taste, and a liveliness of thought, which suggest rapid development in the future. In another review of his work later in the year the reviewer says of his work: “The etchings by Quinton Tidswell … delight the eye with their cleanness of workmanship, their admirable placement of objects and their refinement and delicacy of feeling.” The National Gallery of Australia hold the following works:

- Bank of New South Wales Windsor - etching
- Burdekin House - etching
- Country Road - etching
- Demolitions - etching
- Edmund's Kurrajong - etching
- Interior St James’ - drypoint
- Lower Kent Street - etching and drypoint
- Lower Kent Street - pencil drawing
- Nocturne - etching
- Old buildings George Street Windsor - etching
- Old Phillip Street etching
- Phillip Street from Circular Quay pencil drawing
- Trees and Farm Sheds - etching

== Later life ==
War intervened and like his older brothers in World War One Tidswell volunteered to serve in World War Two. With art training he became a topographical draftsman and map maker in New Guinea. He enlisted at Prahran, Victoria on 6 July 1942 and left for war service from Perth. Tidswell was discharged on 15 January 1946. Post war he remained in Victoria. In 1953 he married Rose Lillian Dempsey (1922—2009) in Melbourne. The union produced two children, Sally and Jennifer. Rose Tidswell was a talented musician and music teacher. In 1959 the Tidswell’s bought property at Mildura and for some time Tidswell taught art at Mildura High School. In the early 1960s, he mainly painted landscapes in and around Lock 11 on the Murray River. Tidswell was not a natural teacher and after leaving Mildura he didn't further pursue his art career or teaching. His family returned to Melbourne and in 1991 Tidswell died in Wangaratta survived by his daughters.
