= Richard Jones (New South Wales politician, born 1843) =

Australian politician (1843–1909)

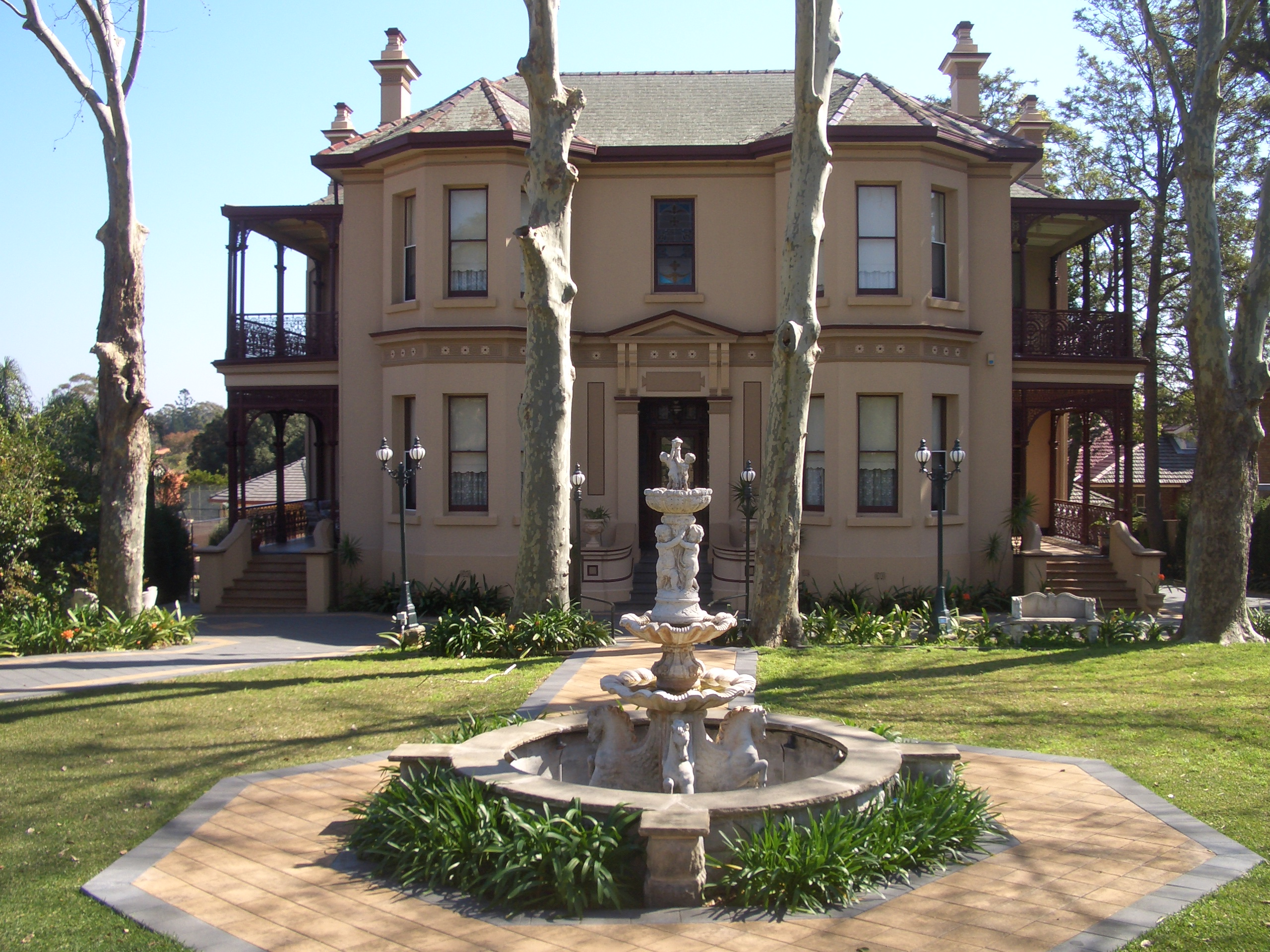
Gayton (built c.1885) was the home of Richard Jones MLC in Burwood Road, Burwood.

Richard Jones (3 December 1843 – 30 April 1909) was an Australian politician.

He was born in Maitland to Richard Jones, at that time a newspaper publisher, and Martha Olley. His father was a member of the New South Wales Legislative Council from 1829 until 1843 and again from 1850 until 1852.

He worked as a stock and station agent both in Sydney and in rural areas, eventually joining the firm Harrison, Jones and Devlin, of which he became managing director. On 20 February 1868 he married Mary Jane Coleson, with whom he had three children; he later married Edith Maria Moore, with whom he had a further eleven children. In 1899 he was appointed to the Legislative Council, serving until his death in Burwood in 1909.

In 1902 his third daughter, Edith Millie Jones, married Dr Frank Tidswell at St. Paul's Anglican Church Burwood.
