= Col. Littleton =

American fashion designer

Colonel Littleton
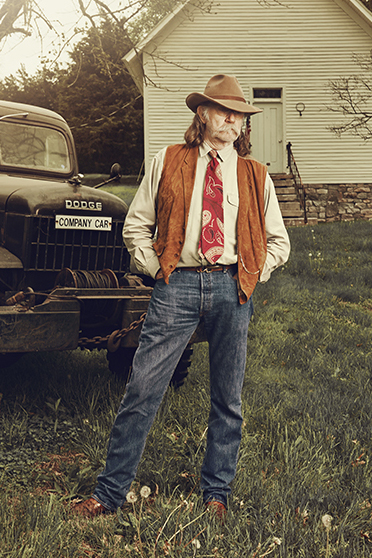
- Littleton at his Foxfire Farm
- Born: December 15, 1943 (age 82); Camden, Tennessee, United States
- Occupation: Fashion Designer
- Known for: Americana style; Customer experience
- Label: Col. Littleton
- Awards: 2009 Inductee Tennessee State Museum; Costume & Textile Institute; Honorary Colonel in Tennessee and Kentucky

Garry Allen Littleton (born December 15, 1943), known as Colonel Littleton, is an American fashion designer and business proprietor, best known for his Col. Littleton brand of leather goods, apparel and specialty products − most handmade in his Lynnville, TN workshop by local craftsmen. Col. Littleton, The Great American Leather Company, was established in 1987.

== Early life ==
Colonel Littleton was born Garry Allen Littleton in Camden, Tennessee to Avery (née Allen) and Lester Coleman Littleton, a millwright and carpenter. Following the loss of his mother, his father married Martha Beech and the family relocated to Oak Ridge, Tennessee and later to Nashville where Colonel spent his formative years.

Colonel graduated from Bellevue High School in Nashville, TN, attended David Lipscomb University and later served in the US Coast Guard.

== Career ==
Littleton worked at Tom James Co., where he sold custom men's clothing and as National Sales Director at The Benson Company (later known as Benson Records), a music publishing company in Nashville, TN. Later, he worked for New York-based companies like Ghurka and Trafalgar, selling clothing and accessories to men's specialty stores.

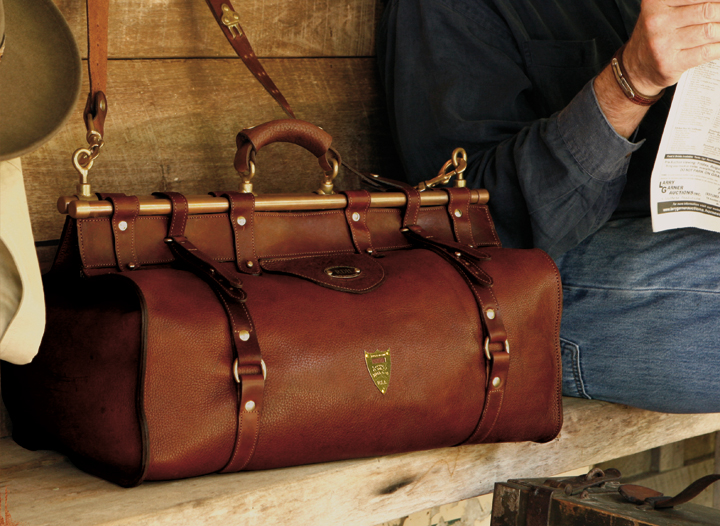
Col. Littleton No.3 Grip

=== Business ===
He launched his label in 1987 from the third floor attic of his home, selling antique cufflinks to specialty stores such as Paul Stuart in New York City, that appreciated his eye for the interesting. He designed the packaging, creating the cross swords logo and Col. Littleton motif that would become his brand mark.

From antique cufflinks he moved into pocket knives, which he designed using mother of pearl and bone. He offered customers the option to engrave the handle and/or bolsters.

Over the years, the business has expanded into leather goods. Colonel's collection includes a diverse array of products including leather travel bags, briefcases, handbags, portfolios, journals, apparel, and beyond. Each item reflects his deep respect for tradition and dedication to craftsmanship.

== Personal life ==
He married Norma Ann (Susie) Hobbs in 1975.
