= Lynching of George and Ed Hartley =

Lynching in Camden, Tennessee, USA

- Part of Vigilante Justice
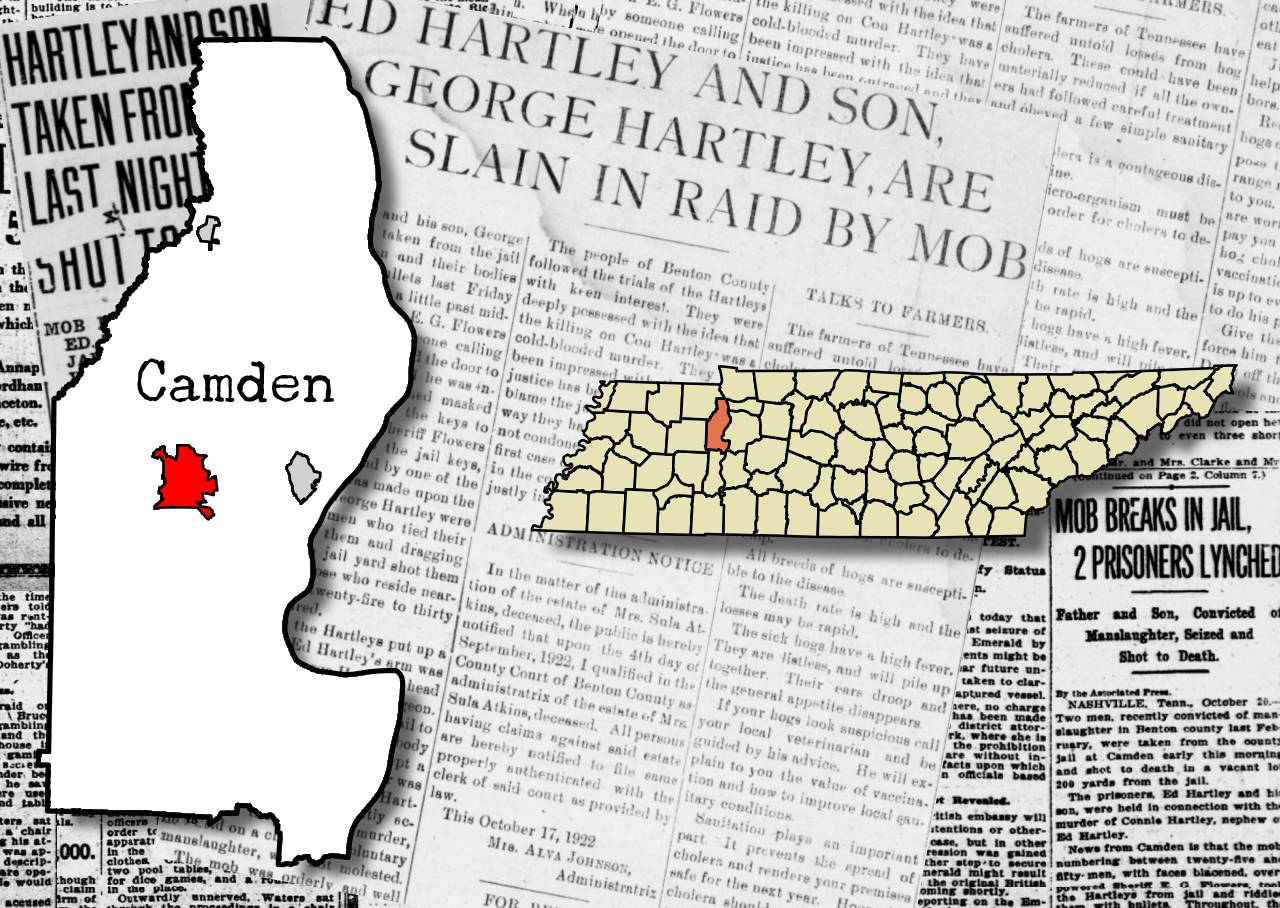
- News coverage of the Lynching of George and Ed Hartley
- Date: October 20, 1922
- Location: Camden, Benton County, Tennessee
- Participants: A mob made up of 20-50 men
- Deaths: Ed Hartley; George Hartley

Ed and his son George Hartley were lynched in Camden, Benton County, Tennessee by a mob on October 20, 1922. According to the United States Senate Committee on the Judiciary they were the 54th and 55th of 61 lynchings during 1922 in the United States. The two were the only lynchings of white victims in the state of Tennessee and of the 61 lynchings they were 2 of 6 white victims.

== Background ==
Ed and his son George Hartley were being held in connection with the manslaughter of Connie Hartley, nephew of Ed Hartley in Benton County, Tennessee. On February 20, 1922, Connie Hartley and his father John Hartley were cutting wood ties near Harmon Creek when they were fired upon. Connie "Con" Hartley was killed instantly. His father, John Hartley, was seriously wounded and was on death's door for several days. On September 22, 1922, Ed and George were convicted of voluntary manslaughter in the Benton County circuit court. During the same trial, Vuid Hartley (the son of Ed Hartley) and Bill Conley (a local boy) were acquitted of the voluntary manslaughter charge.

On October 20, 1922, Ed and George Hartley were in the Benton County jail, in Camden, filing a motion for a new trial.

== Lynching ==
Sheriff E.G. Flowers was on duty in the Camden jail when he heard a knock at the door around midnight on October 20, 1922. When he opened the door he was overwhelmed by a mob of 20-50 people with black stockings pulled over their heads and eye holes cut out. While Sheriff Flowers didn't give up the keys the men of the mob quickly found where they were kept. The mob dragged Ed and George from their cell but not without a fight. At the Hugh Bivens undertakers, a post-mortem showed that Ed's arm was broken in the struggle and George was hit with a blunt object causing heavy bruising to his head. Void Hartley (the son of Ed Hartley) and Bill Conley who were in another cell were left alone. A trail of blood led police from the jail to a vacant lot, 200 yards (180 m) away, where the bodies of Ed and George were discovered. Ed's corpse was naked with his clothes stripped off him.

The family took possession of the bodies on Friday, October 20, 1922. Hundreds of people viewed the bodies during the funeral. The next day they were buried at the Phifer graveyard in unmarked graves.

== See also ==
- List of lynchings in the United States in 1922

== Bibliography ==
Notes

- "Ed Hartley and son George Hartley, are slain in raid by mob". The Camden Chronicle. Camden, Benton, Tennessee: Travis Bros. October 27, 1922. pp. 1–4. ISSN 2374-8591. OCLC 18998985.
- "Hartley and son taken from jail last night and shot to death". The Commonwealth. Scotland Neck, Halifax, North Carolina: E.E. Hilliard. October 20, 1922. pp. 1–4. ISSN 2474-9931. OCLC 25107331.
- "Mob breaks in jail, 2 prisoners lynched". Evening Star. Washington, District of Columbia: W.D. Wallach & Hope. October 20, 1922. ISSN 2331-9968. OCLC 2260929.
- Smith, Jonathan Kennon; Dunn, Joy Bailey; Crawford, Charles Wann (1979). Benton County. Memphis State University Press. ISBN 9780878700622. - Total pages: 136
- United States Senate Committee on the Judiciary (1926). "To Prevent and Punish the Crime of Lynching: Hearings Before the United States Senate Committee on the Judiciary, Subcommittee on S. 121, Sixty-Ninth Congress, First Session, on Feb. 16, 1926". United States Government Publishing Office.

Number	Name	Date	Place	Method of lynching	Number of victims
1	Bill McAllister	January 8, 1922	Williamsburg, S.C.	Shot	1
2	Lincoln Hickson	January 8, 1922	Williamsburg, S.C.	Shot	1
3	Willie Jenkins	January 10, 1922	Eufaula, Alabama	Shot	1
4	Jake Brooks	January 14, 1922	Oklahoma City, Oklahoma	Hanged	1
5	Charles Strong	January 17, 1922	Mayo, Florida	Hanged	1
6	Will Bell	January 29, 1922	Pontotoc, Mississippi	Shot	1
7	Unidentified	January 29, 1922	Pontotoc, Mississippi	Shot	
8	Drew Conner (White)	January 28, 1922	Bolinger, Alabama	Burned	1
9	Will Thrasher	February 1, 1922	Crystal Springs, Mississippi	Hanged	1
10	Harry Harrison	February 2, 1922	Malvern, Arkansas	Shot	1
11	Manuel Duarte	February 2, 1922	Cameron County, Texas	Shot	1
12	P. Norman	February 11, 1922	Texarkana, Arkansas	Shot	1
13	Will Jones	February 13, 1922	Ellaville, Georgia	Shot	1
14	William Baker	March 8, 1922	Aberdeen, Mississippi	Hanged	1
15	Alfred Williams	March 12, 1922	Harlem, Georgia	Hanged	1
16	Brown Culpepper (White)	March 13, 1922	Holly Grove, Louisiana	Shot	1
17	Jerry Ingram	March 17, 1922	Crawford, Mississippi	Shot	1
18	Unidentified (white)	March 19, 1922	Okay, Oklahoma	Drowned	1
19	Alexander Smith	March 22, 1922	Gulfport, Mississippi	Hanged	1
20	Snap Curry	May 6, 1922	Kirvin, Texas	Burned	1
21	H. Varney (or Johnnie Cornish)	May 6, 1922	Kirvin, Texas	Burned	1
22	Mose Jones	May 6, 1922	Kirvin, Texas	Burned	1
23	Tom Cornish	May 8, 1922	Kirvin, Texas	Hanged	1
24	Thomas Early	May 17, 1922	Conroe, Texas	Burned	1
25	Charles Atkins	May 18, 1922	Davisboro, Georgia	Burned	1
26	Hullen Owens	May 19, 1922	Texarkana, Texas	Hanged (body burned)	1
27	Joe Winters	May 20, 1922	Conroe, Texas	Burned	1
28	Mose Bozier	May 20, 1922	Alleyton, Texas	Hanged	1
29	Gilbert Wilson	May 23, 1922	Bryan, Texas	Beaten to death	1
30	Jesse Thomas	May 26, 1922	Waco, Texas	Shot (body burned)	1
31	William Byrd	May 28, 1922	Brentwood, Georgia	Shot (body burned)	1
32	Robert Collins	June 20, 1922	Summit, Mississippi	Hanged	1
33	Warren Lewis	June 23, 1922	New Dacus, Texas	Hanged	1
34	James Harvey	July 1, 1922	Lanes Bridge, Georgia	Hanged	1
35	Joe Jordan	July 1, 1922	Lanes Bridge, Georgia	Hanged	1
36	Philip Tankard	July 5, 1922	Belhaven, North Carolina	Shot	1
37	Joe Pemberton	July 7, 1922	Benton, Louisiana	Hanged	1
38	Jake "Shake" Davis	July 14, 1922	Miller County, Georgia	Hanged	1
39	Oscar Mack	July 18, 1922	Orange County, Florida	Hanged (False report, Oscar Mack survived)	1
40	Will Anderson	July 24, 1922	Allentown, Georgia	Shot	1
41	John West	July 28, 1922	Guernsey, Arkansas	Shot	1
42	Gilbert Harris	August 1, 1922	Hot Springs, Arkansas	Hanged	1
43	John Glover	August 1, 1922	Holton,	Shot	1
44	Bayner Blackwell	August 6, 1922	Swansboro, North Carolina	Shot	1
45	John Steelman	August 23, 1922	Lambert, Mississippi	Burned	1
46	Thomas Rivers	August 30, 1922	Bossier Parish, Louisiana	Hanged	1
47	F. Watt Daniels (White)	August 1922	Mer Rouge, Louisiana	Ku-Klux Klan	1
48	Thomas F. Richards (White)	August 1922	Mer Rouge, Louisiana	Ku-Klux Klan	1
49	Jim Reed Long	September 2, 1922	Winder, Georgia	Ku-Klux Klan	1
50	O.J. Johnson	September 7, 1922	Newton, Texas	Hanged	1
51	Jim Johnston	September 28, 1922	Sandersville, Georgia	Hanged	1
52	Grover C. Everett	September 28, 1922	Abilene, Texas	Shot	1
53	John Brown	October 3, 1922	Montgomery, Alabama	Shot	1
54	Ed Hartley (white)	October 20, 1922	Camden, Tennessee	Shot	1
55	George Hartley (white)	October 20, 1922	Camden, Tennessee	Shot	1
56	Elias V. Zarate	November 11, 1922	Weslaco, Texas	Shot	1
57	Cupid Dickson / Cubrit Dixon	December 5, 1922	Madison, Florida	Shot	1
58	Charles Wright	December 8 ,1922	Perry, Florida	Burned	1
59	Less Smith	December 9, 1922	Morrilton, Arkansas	Burned	1
60	George Gay	December 11, 1922	Streetman, Texas	Hanged	1
61	Arthur Young	December 11, 1922	Perry, Florida	Hanged	1
