= Jay Reedy =

American politician (born 1963)

Member of the Tennessee House of Representatives from the 74th district
- Incumbent
- Assumed office January 13, 2015
- Preceded by: John Tidwell

Personal details
- Born: June 23, 1963 (age 63)
- Party: Republican
- Spouse: Vickie
- Children: 3
- Education: Austin Peay State University (BS)
- Website: State House website Campaign website

Jay Reedy (born June 23, 1963) is an American politician from the state of Tennessee. A Republican, he has represented the 74th district of the Tennessee House of Representatives, covering Houston, Humphreys, and Montgomery Counties, since 2015.

== Career ==
Prior to being elected to office, Reedy held a number of jobs, including cattle farmer, locksmith, army reserve officer, and Houston County election board commissioner.

In 2014, Reedy ran for the 74th district of the Tennessee House of Representatives, challenging Democratic incumbent John Tidwell, who had held the seat since 1997. After handily winning the Republican primary, Reedy narrowly defeated Tidwell in the general election with 52% of the vote.

Reedy won re-election in 2016 and 2018 with increasingly dominant margins, and faces no opposition whatsoever in 2020. In 2019, Reedy vied to replace Glen Casada as Speaker of the House, but lost in an intra-caucus vote to fellow Republican Cameron Sexton.

In 2023, Reedy supported a resolution to expel three Democratic lawmakers from the legislature for violating decorum rules. The expulsion was widely characterized as unprecedented.

== Personal life ==
Reedy lives in Erin with his wife Vickie; they have 3 children.
