= Nyman Furr =

American musician (1949–2007)

Furr's publicity photo c. 1979

Nyman Furr (1949–2007) was an American fiddler, bassist, singer and songwriter from Camden, Tennessee. He was also known as The Tennessee Fiddler, and played with The Little Juice Band. This band played many locations in the panhandle area of Florida, including Sil's Place in Ft. Walton Beach, The Bowery in Destin, The Firehouse in Shalimar, and Mr B's Place in DeFuniak Springs, among other places.

Nyman Furr and The Little Juice Band were headliners at the 1981 Boggy Bayou Mullet Festival in Niceville, Florida. Nyman also played with Maggie Lee and the Percussions in the early 1970s.

Nyman died on March 10, 2007, according to the Camden, Tennessee Chronicle.
