= Jean Bellette =

Australian artist (1908–1991)

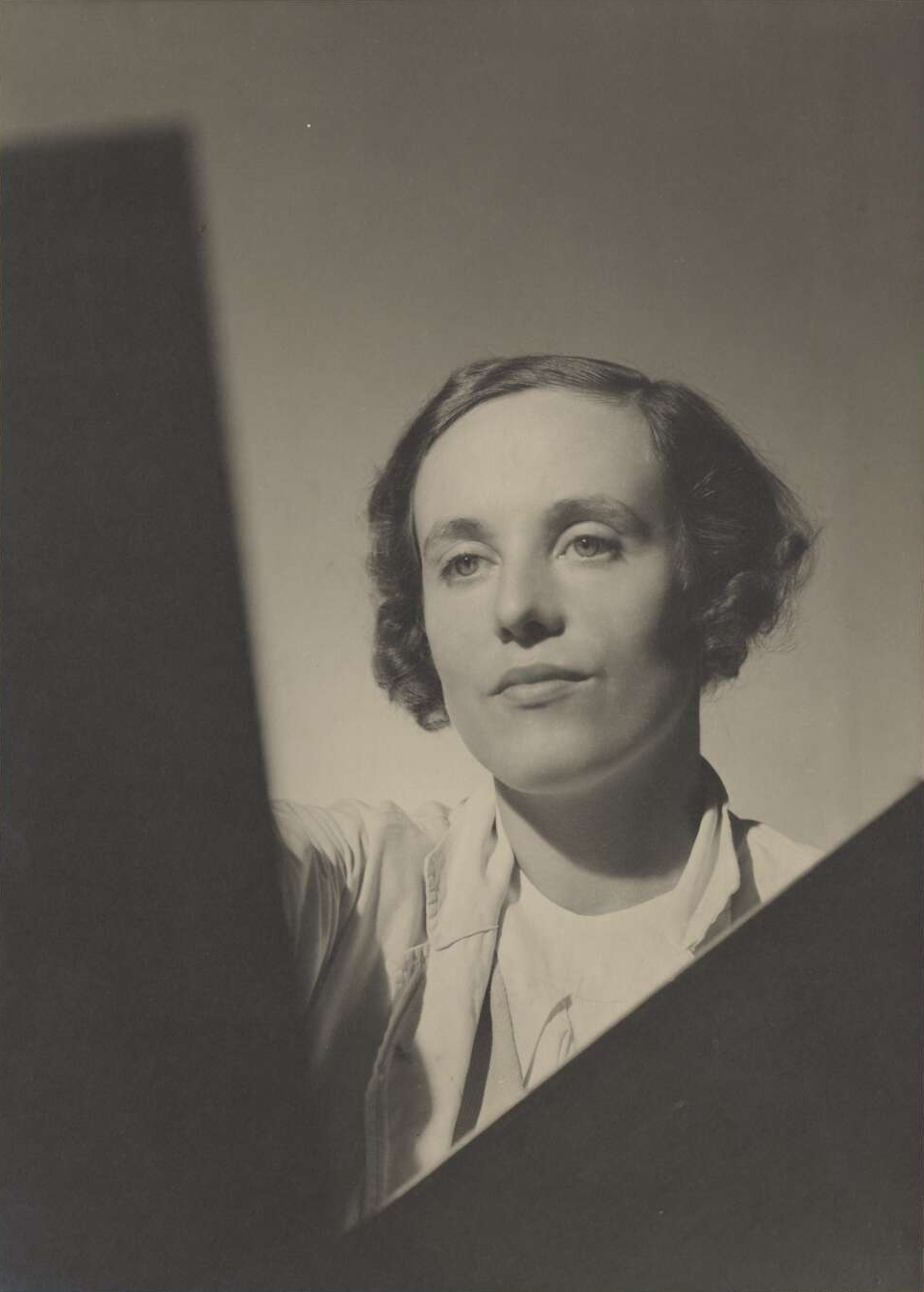
- Bellette in 1936
- Born: 25 March 1908; Hobart, Tasmania, Australia
- Died: 16 March 1991 (aged 82); Palma, Majorca, Spain
- Education: Sydney Art School; Westminster School of Art
- Known for: Painting
- Notable work: For Whom the Bell Tolls (1942); Iphigenia in Tauris (1944)
- Awards: Sulman Prize; 1942 For Whom the Bell Tolls; 1944 Iphigenia in Tauris

Jean Bellette (occasionally Jean Haefliger; 25 March 1908 – 16 March 1991) was an Australian artist. Born in Tasmania, she was educated in Hobart and at Julian Ashton's art school in Sydney, where one of her teachers was Thea Proctor. In London she studied under painters Bernard Meninsky and Mark Gertler.

A modernist painter, Bellette was influential in mid-twentieth century Sydney art circles. She frequently painted scenes influenced by the Greek tragedies of Euripides and Sophocles and the epics of Homer. The only woman to have won the Sulman Prize more than once, Bellette claimed the accolade in 1942 with For Whom the Bell Tolls, and in 1944 with Iphigenia in Tauris. She helped found the Blake Prize for Religious Art, and was its inaugural judge. Bellette married artist and critic Paul Haefliger in 1935. The couple moved to Majorca in 1957; although she visited and exhibited in Australia thereafter, she did not return there to live, and became peripheral to the Australian art scene.

== Early life and training ==
Bellette was born in Hobart on 25 March 1908 and grew up an only child in rural Tasmania with her artist mother and postmaster father. Initially a student at the local Anglican school in Deloraine, at the age of 13 she became a boarder at Friends' School in Hobart, and then at Hobart's technical college.

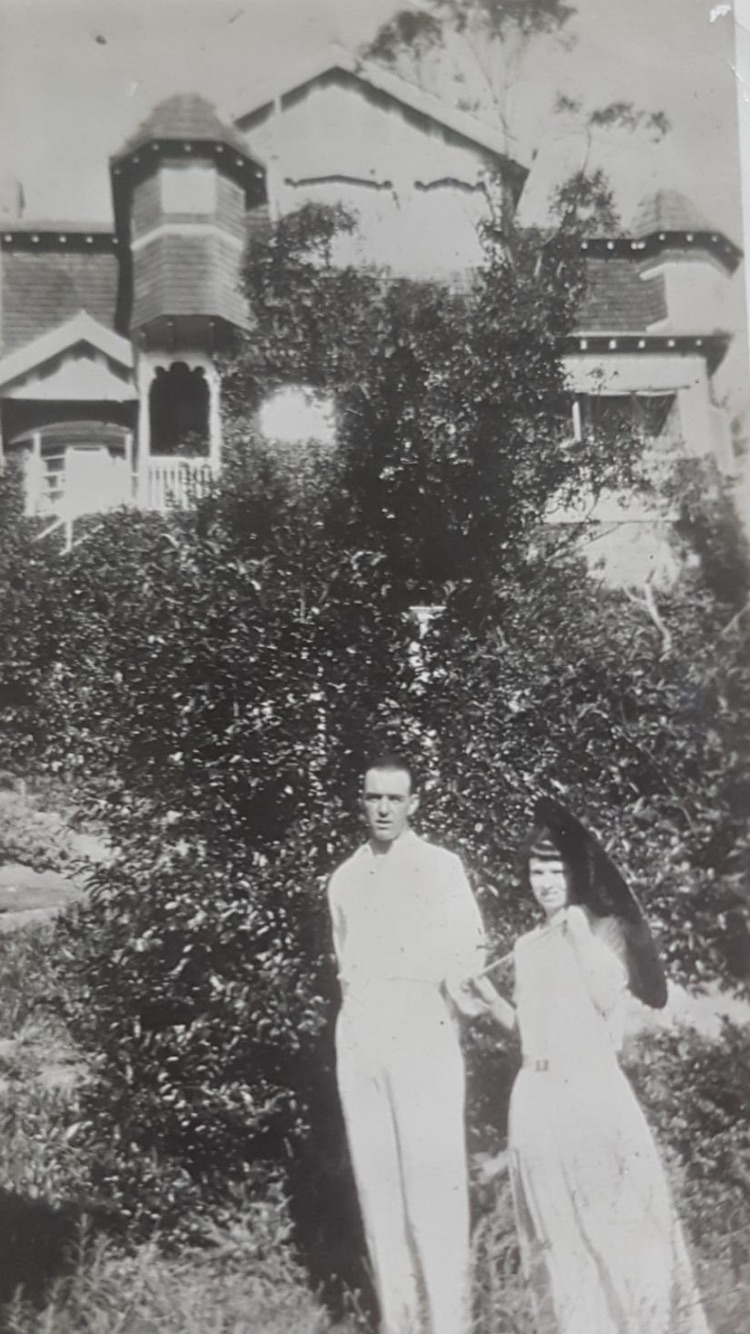
Jean Bellette and fellow Julian Ashton art student Quinton Tidswell in front of the Tidswell family home in Sydney

She was subsequently a student at Julian Ashton Art School in Sydney. Her teachers included Thea Proctor, and fellow students included artist John Passmore and Quinton Tidswell. Her drawings and watercolours displayed in the 1934 student art exhibition attracted favourable comment from the art critic for The Sydney Morning Herald. At Ashton's art school, Bellette met fellow Australian artist Paul Haefliger, and in 1935 they married. The following year they travelled to Europe, and Bellette (like Passmore) studied at the Westminster School of Art, where she was taught by figurative painters Bernard Meninsky and Mark Gertler. In 1938, Bellette and her husband studied life drawing at Académie de la Grande Chaumière in Paris.

== Career ==
=== Australia ===
Bellette and Haefliger returned to Australia just before the outbreak of World War II. Shortly after her arrival, Bellette held an exhibition at Sydney's Macquarie Galleries. The couple became influential members of the Sydney Art Group, a network of "fashionable" moderns whose membership included William Dobell and Russell Drysdale. Bellette painted and held regular shows – "a solo show every second year and a group show every year at the Macquarie Galleries". Her husband served as art critic for The Sydney Morning Herald for a decade and a half.

In 1942, Bellette won the Sir John Sulman Prize with For Whom the Bell Tolls. She won it again in 1944 with her painting Iphigenia in Tauris, inspired by Euripides' play. The composition is set in a dry, open landscape, with several riders on horses whose appearance suggests "the Australian present, rather than Greek antiquity". The judge awarding the prize actually preferred another of her entries, Electra, depicting the sister of Iphigenia also prominent in Greek tragedy – but it failed to meet the size requirements. Both Iphigenia in Tauris and Electra were among the many works created by Bellette in the 1940s that were inspired by the tragedies of Euripides, Sophocles and Homer. Her choice of subject matter and approach placed her at odds with mainstream modernism, while she seemed to shun explicit links between the classical and the Australian. Bellette reasoned that she preferred to choose her palette and the spatial arrangements of her compositions to evoke a place's atmosphere. Critics identified the influence of European modernists Aristide Maillol and Giorgio de Chirico, as well as Italian Quattrocento painters Masaccio and Piero della Francesca, about some of whom Bellette wrote articles in the journal Art in Australia.

The most distinctive feature of the artist's work was this choice of classical subjects. In 1946, Bellette's paintings were hung in at least four separate exhibitions. Reviewers commented on her synthesis of "the impulsiveness of romanticism and the deliberateness of classicism", and her "romantically classical" approach. Despite the generally positive views, there were some reservations, particularly that the artist might be at risk of settling upon, and then repeating, a formula in her work. Bellette's treatment of classical subjects extended beyond conventional painting; in 1947 she created a textile design, titled "myths and legends", and in 1948 she created the sets for a production of Shakespeare's Pericles, Prince of Tyre. Her "vigorous imaginativeness" was well reviewed, though the acting was not.

Chorus without Iphigenia (c. 1950)

Though she did not again win the Sulman, she was successful in having works hung in that competition on many occasions, including the 1946, 1947, 1948 and 1950 shows. Bellette continued to paint classical scenes, and around 1950 produced the work Chorus without Iphigenia. Purchased by the National Gallery of Australia in 1976, this oil painting shows five figures, "posed like statues in a tableau vivant, [and who] possess a kind of erotic energy". Anne Gray, the National Gallery's curator, interpreted the scene chosen by Bellette:

Although nothing is happening in this image, we associate the figures with tragedy, with death and mourning – with the classical reference in the painting's title. Iphigenia, Agamemnon's daughter, gave her life for her country when the goddess Artemis asked for it in exchange for favourable winds so that the Greek ships could sail to Troy. Bellette's melancholic painting might be supposed to portray Iphigenia's friends mourning her death.

In 1951, Bellette came second in the Commonwealth Jubilee Art Competition, behind the young Jeffrey Smart. The following year, she won a competitive exhibition sponsored by Metro Goldwyn Mayer, with Girl With Still Life.

Although Haefliger never critiqued his wife's exhibitions, others occasionally stepped in to provide reviews in the Herald. Describing her 1950 exhibition at the Macquarie Galleries, one critic considered it "one of the most stimulating and refreshing that has been seen here for a long time" and that "She paints with a strong, sombre palette and her forms are sculptured with great decision. She uses paint sensuously and passionately, as paint, not as so many contemporary Australians do, as mere colour".

Two years later, the same reviewer, attending another of the artist's solo Sydney shows, observed that Bellette:

is one of the few Australian artists here who combines a firm technique with a sensitive and rich emotion. In some of the lighter landscapes in this exhibition, Miss Bellette seems to have been trying to solve some of the particular difficulties of painting Australian landscapes. The clear, strong light tends to flatten the form and bleach the colour; a problem that doesn't lend itself to the dramatic tensions and dark moods that are characteristic of her work. It requires a colder and more dispassionate approach. But when she finds landscapes to her taste, such as the rugged hills and beetling clouds in No. 8, the earth decaying with erosion in No. 19, or the prickly desolation of "Rough Country", No. 14, she handles them with great skill and effectiveness. Her figure drawings are decisively drawn and firmly modelled. The girls have a pensive dignity as though they are pondering the burdens and joylessness of a future to be spent as caryatids. The still lives and the interior are admirable exercises in formal organisation, the colours being sombre yet rich. (Note: A caryatid is a sculpted female figure that functions as a column or pillar in a building.)

Around this time, Bellette also held a show in Melbourne, which included some black-and-white landscape studies as well as some of her classical Greek subjects. Arnold Shore, art critic for The Argus, drew a contrast between the two groups of works. He thought that one of the landscapes "sets the heart singing with its lovely tone, pattern and sense of place". Continuing, he noted that the landscapes and some other works "attain at their best a standard only vaguely suggested when the painter concerned herself too much with striving after a new treatment of ancient Grecian ideals."

Still life with wooden bowl (c. 1954)

Paintings by Bellette were among those of twelve Australian artists included in the 1953 Arts Council of Great Britain exhibition in London, five regional British cities, and at the Venice Biennale. Bellette was one of only two women represented, the other being Constance Stokes. As with her Sulman prize-winners, Bellette's subjects were classically themed works: Electra (1944) and Oedipus (1945). Arts Council chairman Kenneth Clark was disappointed with the response of British critics to the exhibition, and their focus on a theme of nationhood paid little regard to the works of Bellette and several others.

As well as spending time in Sydney's art community, in 1954 Haefliger and Bellette purchased a cottage in Hill End, an old gold mining village in central New South Wales. They added a studio, and the site became both a weekender and a venue for social visits and artistic endeavours by colleagues from the Sydney circle, including Drysdale, Margaret Olley, John Olsen, David Edgar Strachan and Donald Friend. This gathering of artists, sometimes referred to as the Hill End Group, is known for its landscape art. Bellette, though sometimes a painter of landscapes, was known for her classical subjects and still lifes, which critics struggled to accommodate within their understanding of the Hill End Group. Nevertheless, several still lifes from this period are held in public collections, including Still Life with Fish (1954), in the Tasmanian Museum and Art Gallery, and Still life with wooden bowl (c. 1954), in the Art Gallery of New South Wales. These images were often rendered with strong colour, which was also sometimes a feature of earlier works on which critics would remark.

Both Bellette and Haefliger had for many years been informal organisers of Sydney's artistic community. In 1955, Bellette helped found the Blake Prize for religious art, and was its inaugural judge.

=== Majorca ===
Spells for Planting (1964), painted at the time Bellette lived in Majorca

In 1957, Haefliger's extramarital affair, which had lasted for over a decade, came to an end. Bellette and Haefliger left Australia intending to divorce quietly, but were reconciled. After a year in Paris they settled in Majorca, living first in Deià before buying a house in the hamlet of C'an Baxu. Bellette painted landscapes and still lifes that reflected a Spanish influence, exemplified by Spells for Planting (1964). This work was acquired by the Art Gallery of New South Wales in the year it was exhibited in Melbourne, one of a number of shows in which Bellette participated in Australia through the 1960s. The year she moved to Majorca turned out to be the last year in which she exhibited work outside Australia. The couple visited in 1970 and 1975, and Bellette returned once more in 1983. Bellette had become an "onlooker" to the local art scene. This was in part because of a transition in Australian art that included the rise of abstract expressionism, the strong influence of a small number of gallery owners, and discrimination against women that reached "record levels". Bellette was nevertheless able to secure some exhibitions in Sydney and Melbourne. These infrequent exhibitions were received very positively by critics. When her work was hung at the South Yarra Gallery in 1964, noted art historian and critic Bernard Smith stated in his review for The Age that he "could not recall an exhibition in Melbourne of this quality since I began to write this column." Reviewing her 1966 show in Sydney, the Herald critic considered it was her "ability to combine the calm beauty of form of her beloved classicism of content with a dark romantic spirit that has gained her such an honourable place in Australian painting...the antiquity of nature and man's constructions are explored with a subtle, powerful inquiry." In 1971, Melbourne critic Alan McCulloch considered her classical compositions to be her most successful. Drawing parallels between classical tragedy and contemporary global refugee crises, he noted "there is infinite tenderness in these paintings and infinite sadness. For although these rocky, shadowed landscapes are peopled with the ghosts and shades of an ancient civilisation, they are also curiously symbolic of present day tensions and tragedies."

Bellette and Haefliger lived and worked for the rest of their lives in Majorca, with periodic trips to Italy. Friends such as artists Jeffrey Smart and John Olsen visited them regularly in Europe. While one biography suggested that an injury to her wrist meant that paintings prepared in 1976 for a solo exhibition were her last, paintings created as recently as 1980 were included in a major retrospective of her work. Haefliger died in March 1982; Bellette survived breast cancer and a mastectomy in 1986 and died on 16 March 1991.

== Legacy ==
Prior to her death, Bellette bequeathed the Hill End cottage to the National Parks and Wildlife Service (which manages the Hill End historic site), on condition that it be used as an artists' retreat. It continues to operate for that purpose. As of 2026, Bellette is the only woman to have won the Sulman Prize on more than one occasion. A large number of her works are held by the Art Gallery of New South Wales; other galleries that hold examples include Bathurst Regional Art Gallery, the Art Gallery of South Australia, Art Gallery of Western Australia, Bendigo Art Gallery, Geelong Art Gallery, the National Gallery of Australia, and the Tasmanian Museum and Art Gallery. In 2004–05, a major retrospective exhibition was held at Bathurst Regional Art Gallery, the S. H. Ervin Gallery in Sydney, the University of Queensland Art Museum, Mornington Peninsula Regional Gallery and the Drill Hall Gallery in Canberra.

Described by Amanda Beresford as Australia's "only true modern classicist", Bellette is generally regarded as an influential figure in the modern art movement in Sydney in the mid-twentieth century. Art historian Janine Burke described Bellette as "a leader of the post-war art world", and the University of Queensland Art Museum's curator placed her as "a seminal figure in the visual arts from the 1930s until her death in Majorca in 1991". Of her paintings, opinions vary. Burke described her as "arguably the best painter" of the Sydney circle. Historian Geoffrey Dutton was unconvinced about her choice of subject but praised Bellette's "assured if muted" style, while dismissing the lesser efforts of her husband. Art historian and writer Sasha Grishin had a different view. Commenting on Bellette's paintings of Greek mythological subjects created in the 1940s, he wrote, "they were neither very convincing as paintings, nor works that had a particular resonance in Sydney or Australian art at the time". John Passmore and Bellette studied together both in Australia and England, travelled in Europe, and exhibited side by side in group shows. He was highly critical of Bellette's work, while Yvonne Audette, who went to a few of the artist's drawing classes, described her classical works as "dull poses, and very badly drawn, and even more badly painted, like clumsy colouring-in".

== Bibliography ==
- Beresford, Amanda (2004). "Classicism and myth in Jean Bellette's work". In France, Christine (ed.). Jean Bellette: Retrospective. New South Wales: National Trust of Australia. pp. 66–69. ISBN 0-9577657-5-4.
- Burke, Janine (1980). Australian Women Artists 1840–1940. Richmond, Victoria: Greenhouse Publications. ISBN 0-909104-30-1.
- Dutton, Geoffrey (1986). The Innovators: The Sydney Alternatives in the Rise of Modern Art, Literature and Ideas. Melbourne: Macmillan Australia. ISBN 978-0-333-41473-6.
- Edwards, Deborah (1995). "Jean Bellette – Electra (1944)". In Kerr, Joan; Callaway, Anita (eds.). Heritage: The National Women's Art Book. Roseville East, New South Wales: G + B Arts International / Craftsman House. pp. 238–239. ISBN 976-641-045-3.
- France, Christine (2004a). "Jean Bellette: Early life and times". In France, Christine (ed.). Jean Bellette: Retrospective. New South Wales: National Trust of Australia. pp. 10–23. ISBN 0-9577657-5-4.
- France, Christine (2004b). "Exhibition history". In France, Christine (ed.). Jean Bellette: Retrospective. New South Wales: National Trust of Australia. pp. 74–77. ISBN 0-9577657-5-4.
- France, Christine, ed. (2004c). Jean Bellette: Retrospective. New South Wales: National Trust of Australia. ISBN 0-9577657-5-4.
- Germaine, Max (1991). A Dictionary of Women Artists of Australia. Roseville East, New South Wales: Craftsman House. ISBN 976-8097-13-2.
- Grishin, Sasha (2005). The art of Grahame King. South Yarra, Victoria: Macmillan Art Publishing. ISBN 978-1-876832-59-9.
- Grishin, Sasha (2013). Australian Art: A History. Carlton, Victoria: The Miegunyah Press. ISBN 978-0-522-85652-1.
- Hall, Barbara (1995). "Bellette, Jean". In Kerr, Joan; Callaway, Anita (eds.). Heritage: The National Women's Art Book. Roseville East, New South Wales: G + B Arts International / Craftsman House. pp. 310–311. ISBN 976-641-045-3.
- Hall, Barbara (2004). "Expatriate years: 1957–1991". In France, Christine (ed.). Jean Bellette: Retrospective. New South Wales: National Trust of Australia. pp. 58–65. ISBN 0-9577657-5-4.
- Hall, Edith (2013). Adventures with Iphigenia in Tauris: A Cultural History of Euripides' Black Sea Tragedy. Oxford: Oxford University Press. ISBN 978-0-19-539289-0.
- Heathcote, Christopher (2003). Yvonne Audette: Paintings and Drawings 1949–2003. Melbourne: Macmillan Education. ISBN 978-1-876832-79-7.
- Pierse, Simon (2012). Australian Art and Artists in London, 1950–1965: An Antipodean Summer. Farnham, Surrey: Ashgate Publishing. ISBN 978-1-4094-2054-5.
- Summers, Anne (2009). The Lost Mother: A Story of Art and Love. Melbourne: Melbourne University Press. ISBN 978-0-522-85635-4.
