= Camden, Tennessee =

Camden
- City
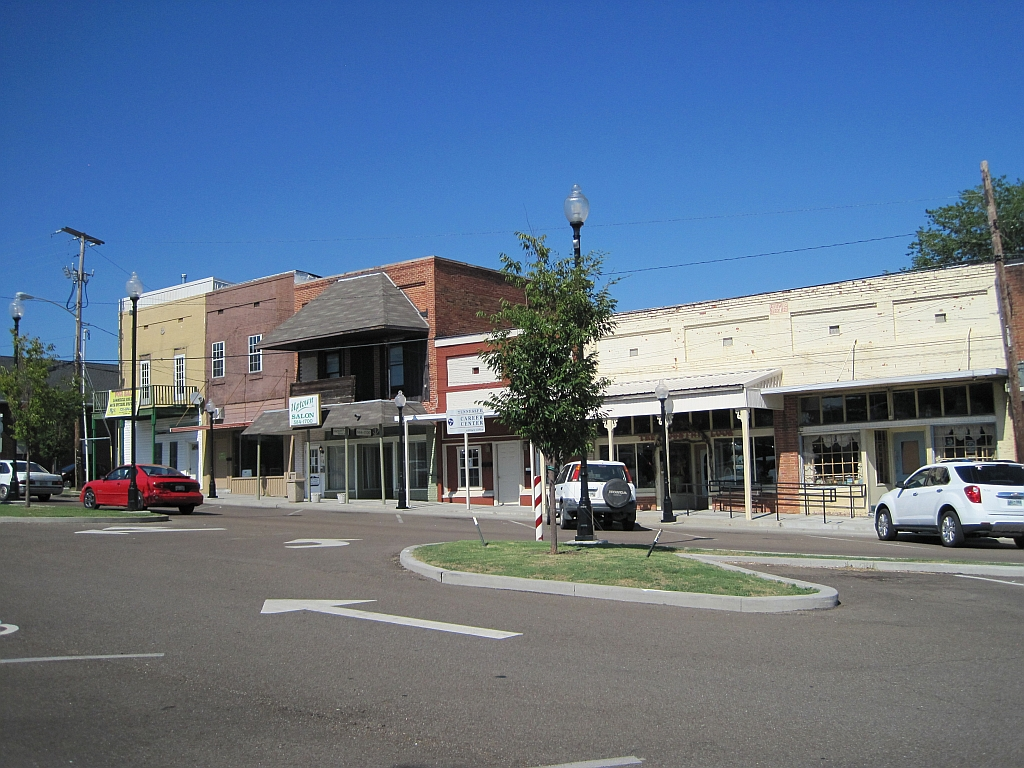
- Downtown Camden

- Location of Camden in Benton County, Tennessee.
- Coordinates: 36°2′47″N 88°5′9″W
- Country: United States
- State: Tennessee
- County: Benton
- Founded: 1836
- Incorporated: 1838
- Named for: Camden, South Carolina

Government
  - Mayor: Roger Pafford

Area
  - Total: 5.68 sq mi (14.70 km^{2})
  - Land: 5.68 sq mi (14.70 km^{2})
  - Water: 0 sq mi (0.00 km^{2})
- Elevation: 449 ft (137 m)

Population (2020)
  - Total: 3,674
  - Density: 647.2/sq mi (249.88/km^{2})
- Time zone: UTC-6 (Central (CST))
  - Summer (DST): UTC-5 (CDT)
- ZIP code: 38320
- Area code: 731
- FIPS code: 47-10560
- GNIS feature ID: 1305616
- Website: www.cityofcamdentn.com

Camden is a city in and the county seat of Benton County, Tennessee, United States. The population was 3,674 at the 2020 census.

== History ==
Native Americans were living in the Camden area as early as the Archaic period (8000-1000 BC). A significant archaeological site has been excavated at nearby Eva (the actual site is now submerged under Kentucky Lake), uncovering evidence of semi-permanent habitation dating back 7000 years.

The first European settlers arrived in the Benton County area around 1818, shortly after (and probably before) the county was purchased from the Chickasaw. Camden has its roots as a stopover along the stage coach route between Nashville and Memphis. Initially known as "Tranquility", the community had attained the name "Camden" by the 1830s, a name influenced by the Revolutionary War-era Battle of Camden. When Benton County was created in 1835, Camden was chosen as the county seat. The City of Camden was officially incorporated in 1838.

On October 20, 1922, George and Ed Hartley were lynched by a large mob outside Camden County Jail after being convicted of manslaughter.

== Geography ==
Camden is situated along Cypress Creek, near the creek's modern confluence with the Kentucky Lake impoundment of the Tennessee River (the original lower 10 miles (16 km) of the creek were entirely engulfed by the lake with the completion of Kentucky Dam in 1944). The area is characterized by low hills to the north and west and wetlands to the east, the latter of which are largely protected by the Camden Wildlife Management Area.

According to the United States Census Bureau, the city has a total area of 5.7 square miles (14.7 km^{2}), all land.

=== Climate ===
Climate data for Camden, Tennessee, 1991–2020 normals, extremes 1997–present
| Month | Jan | Feb | Mar | Apr | May | Jun | Jul | Aug | Sep | Oct | Nov | Dec | Year |
|---|---|---|---|---|---|---|---|---|---|---|---|---|---|
| Record high °F (°C) | 79 (26) | 80 (27) | 87 (31) | 90 (32) | 94 (34) | 104 (40) | 104 (40) | 107 (42) | 102 (39) | 98 (37) | 87 (31) | 78 (26) | 107 (42) |
| Mean maximum °F (°C) | 68.7 (20.4) | 72.3 (22.4) | 80.6 (27.0) | 85.9 (29.9) | 89.0 (31.7) | 94.4 (34.7) | 96.3 (35.7) | 97.5 (36.4) | 93.3 (34.1) | 87.5 (30.8) | 77.5 (25.3) | 70.7 (21.5) | 98.9 (37.2) |
| Mean daily maximum °F (°C) | 48.6 (9.2) | 53.5 (11.9) | 62.5 (16.9) | 72.1 (22.3) | 79.2 (26.2) | 86.2 (30.1) | 89.5 (31.9) | 89.5 (31.9) | 83.6 (28.7) | 73.3 (22.9) | 61.3 (16.3) | 51.6 (10.9) | 70.9 (21.6) |
| Daily mean °F (°C) | 38.5 (3.6) | 42.8 (6.0) | 50.8 (10.4) | 60.1 (15.6) | 68.5 (20.3) | 76.2 (24.6) | 79.8 (26.6) | 78.8 (26.0) | 72.0 (22.2) | 60.7 (15.9) | 49.7 (9.8) | 42.1 (5.6) | 60.0 (15.6) |
| Mean daily minimum °F (°C) | 28.3 (−2.1) | 32.1 (0.1) | 39.2 (4.0) | 48.0 (8.9) | 57.7 (14.3) | 66.3 (19.1) | 70.1 (21.2) | 68.1 (20.1) | 60.4 (15.8) | 48.1 (8.9) | 38.1 (3.4) | 32.5 (0.3) | 49.1 (9.5) |
| Mean minimum °F (°C) | 11.2 (−11.6) | 14.6 (−9.7) | 22.6 (−5.2) | 31.7 (−0.2) | 40.9 (4.9) | 54.5 (12.5) | 60.3 (15.7) | 57.9 (14.4) | 47.5 (8.6) | 32.7 (0.4) | 22.7 (−5.2) | 17.1 (−8.3) | 9.3 (−12.6) |
| Record low °F (°C) | −1 (−18) | 4 (−16) | 4 (−16) | 22 (−6) | 35 (2) | 45 (7) | 55 (13) | 49 (9) | 35 (2) | 27 (−3) | 15 (−9) | 7 (−14) | −1 (−18) |
| Average precipitation inches (mm) | 4.10 (104) | 4.41 (112) | 4.50 (114) | 4.39 (112) | 5.40 (137) | 4.57 (116) | 4.05 (103) | 3.82 (97) | 3.43 (87) | 4.13 (105) | 4.02 (102) | 4.82 (122) | 51.64 (1,311) |
| Average snowfall inches (cm) | 1.0 (2.5) | 0.7 (1.8) | 0.6 (1.5) | 0.0 (0.0) | 0.0 (0.0) | 0.0 (0.0) | 0.0 (0.0) | 0.0 (0.0) | 0.0 (0.0) | 0.0 (0.0) | 0.1 (0.25) | 0.3 (0.76) | 2.7 (6.81) |
| Average precipitation days (≥ 0.01 in) | 9.3 | 9.4 | 10.5 | 10.3 | 10.3 | 9.0 | 8.8 | 7.7 | 6.1 | 6.8 | 8.6 | 9.7 | 106.5 |
| Average snowy days (≥ 0.1 in) | 0.6 | 0.6 | 0.2 | 0.0 | 0.0 | 0.0 | 0.0 | 0.0 | 0.0 | 0.0 | 0.0 | 0.2 | 1.6 |
Source 1: NOAA
Source 2: National Weather Service (mean maxima/minima 2006–2020)

== Demographics ==
Historical population
| Census | Pop. | Note | %± |
|---|---|---|---|
| 1850 | 176 | | — |
| 1860 | 159 | | −9.7% |
| 1870 | 148 | | −6.9% |
| 1880 | 200 | | 35.1% |
| 1890 | 330 | | 65.0% |
| 1900 | 399 | | 20.9% |
| 1910 | 692 | | 73.4% |
| 1920 | 800 | | 15.6% |
| 1930 | 955 | | 19.4% |
| 1940 | 992 | | 3.9% |
| 1950 | 2,029 | | 104.5% |
| 1960 | 2,774 | | 36.7% |
| 1970 | 3,052 | | 10.0% |
| 1980 | 3,279 | | 7.4% |
| 1990 | 3,643 | | 11.1% |
| 2000 | 3,828 | | 5.1% |
| 2010 | 3,582 | | −6.4% |
| 2020 | 3,674 | | 2.6% |

=== 2020 census ===
As of the 2020 census, Camden had a population of 3,674, 1,574 households, and 759 families residing in the city. The median age was 40.2 years, with 22.8% of residents under the age of 18 and 21.3% 65 years of age or older. For every 100 females there were 91.3 males, and for every 100 females age 18 and over there were 85.2 males age 18 and over.

Racial composition as of the 2020 census
| Race | Number | Percent |
|---|---|---|
| White | 3,204 | 87.2% |
| Black or African American | 158 | 4.3% |
| American Indian and Alaska Native | 14 | 0.4% |
| Asian | 49 | 1.3% |
| Native Hawaiian and Other Pacific Islander | 0 | 0.0% |
| Some other race | 60 | 1.6% |
| Two or more races | 189 | 5.1% |
| Hispanic or Latino (of any race) | 140 | 3.8% |

There were 1,574 households in Camden, of which 28.7% had children under the age of 18 living in them. Of all households, 33.6% were married-couple households, 18.9% were households with a male householder and no spouse or partner present, and 40.0% were households with a female householder and no spouse or partner present. About 37.7% of all households were made up of individuals and 19.9% had someone living alone who was 65 years of age or older.

There were 1,769 housing units, of which 11.0% were vacant. The homeowner vacancy rate was 3.0% and the rental vacancy rate was 6.8%.

0.0% of residents lived in urban areas, while 100.0% lived in rural areas.

=== 2000 census ===
As of the census of 2000, there was a population of 3,828, with 1,631 households and 1,014 families residing in the city. The population density was 344.9 inhabitants per square mile (133.2/km^{2}). There were 1,840 housing units at an average density of 165.8 per square mile (64.0/km^{2}). The racial makeup of the city was 93.08% White, 5.33% African American, 0.26% Native American, 0.24% Asian, 0.31% from other races, and 0.78% from two or more races. Hispanic or Latino of any race were 1.33% of the population.

There were 1,631 households, out of which 24.2% had children under the age of 18 living with them, 46.5% were married couples living together, 13.2% had a female householder with no husband present, and 37.8% were non-families. 35.1% of all households were made up of individuals, and 19.9% had someone living alone who was 65 years of age or older. The average household size was 2.19 and the average family size was 2.81.

In the city, the population was spread out, with 20.1% under the age of 18, 6.9% from 18 to 24, 24.5% from 25 to 44, 22.5% from 45 to 64, and 26.0% who were 65 years of age or older. The median age was 44 years. For every 100 females, there were 81.9 males. For every 100 females age 18 and over, there were 77.4 males.

The median income for a household in the city was $26,348, and the median income for a family was $31,667. Males had a median income of $27,413 versus $20,142 for females. The per capita income for the city was $15,271. About 11.6% of families and 16.6% of the population were below the poverty line, including 26.1% of those under age 18 and 12.9% of those age 65 or over.

== Economy ==
Agriculture is important to the economy of Camden and Benton County. Sorghum was once a key crop; the last sorghum processing facility closed in 2001.

Jones Plastic and Engineering operates a 60,000-square-foot (5,600 m^{2}) facility in Camden.

Camden is a bedroom community for employees of the Tennessee Valley Authority, and the DuPont titanium dioxide production plant in nearby New Johnsonville.

== Parks and recreation ==
- Birdsong Trail Ride
- Camden Speedway
- Camden City Park

== Education ==
Camden is served by the Benton County School System. Schools include:

- Camden Elementary
- Camden Junior High School
- Camden Central High School

== Media ==
=== Radio stations ===
- WRJB-FM 95.9 "Magic 95.9 the Valley"

=== Newspapers ===
- The Camden Chronicle
- The Marketplace
- Tennessee Magnet Publications

== Infrastructure ==
=== Transportation ===
- U.S. Route 70 connects Camden to Nashville to the east and Memphis to the west. It has a business route (US 70 Business) that runs through the center of town while the mainline bypasses Camden to the south.
- Tennessee State Route 191 connects Camden to Eva and to Nathan Bedford Forrest State Park to the northeast and Interstate 40 to the southeast.
- U.S. Route 641, which intersects US 70 Business in the western half of Camden and US 70 south of Camden, connects the area with Paris and Kentucky to the north and with I-40 and Parsons to the south.
- Tennessee State Route 69A begins in Camden at the intersection of US 70 Business and TN 191 and runs north to Big Sandy.

== Notable people ==
- Nyman Furr, musician known as "The Tennessee Fiddler"
- Tanner Hudson, NFL tight end for the Cincinnati Bengals
- Frank P. Lashlee, member of Tennessee General Assembly
- Col. Littleton, fashion designer
- Charles F. Pendleton, awarded a Medal of Honor for his actions in the Korean War
