= Tidwell Field =

Baseball park located in Texas, United States

Coordinates: 32.442591°N 97.811724°W

Tidwell Field is a baseball park located in Granbury, TX and was the home of the Texas Collegiate League Granbury Generals in 2004. It is also the home of the Granbury Pirates baseball team.
