= Thomas Tidswell =

Australian architect

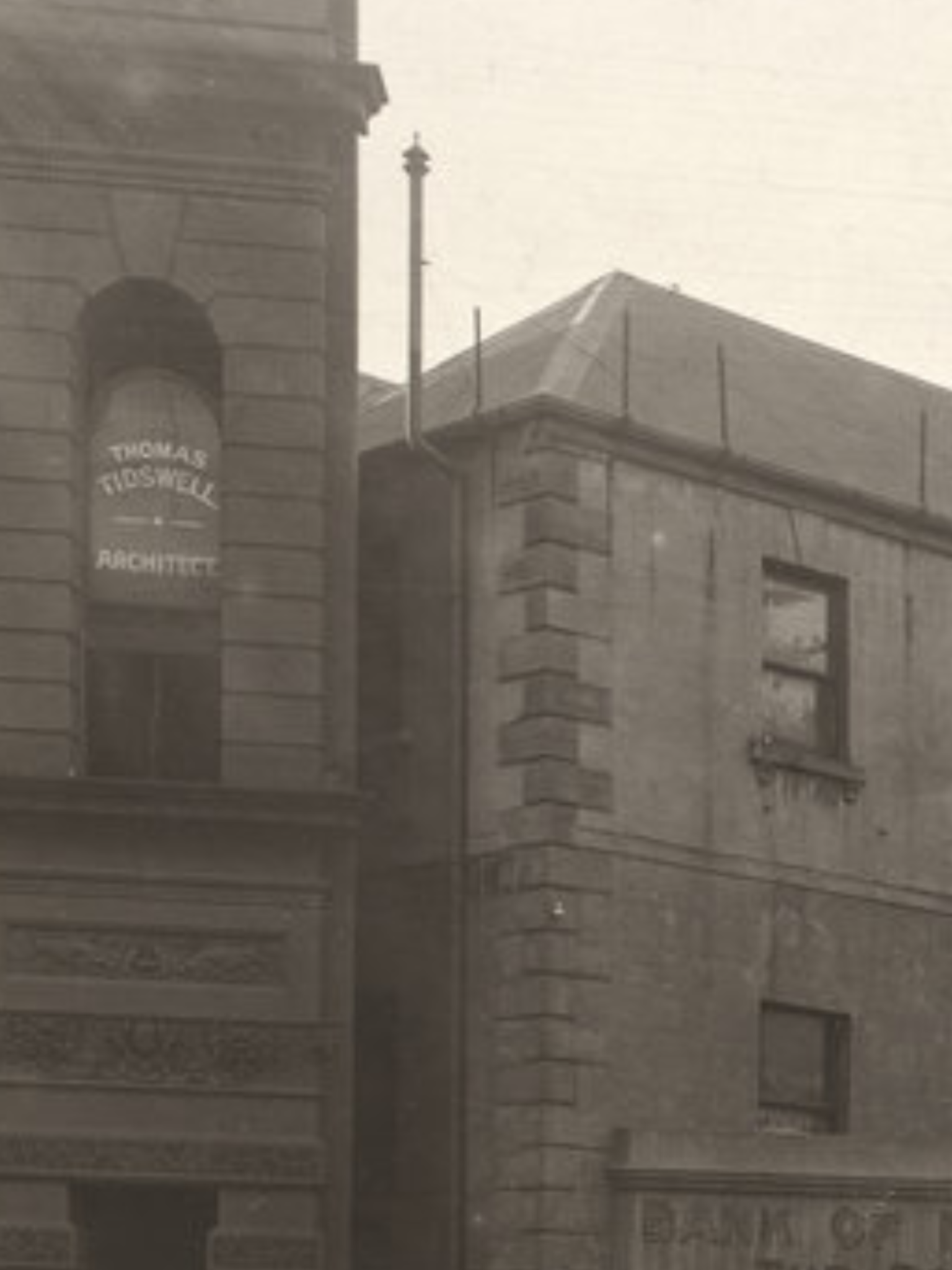
- Born: Thomas Tidswell; 1870; Sydney New South Wales
- Died: 1950 (aged 79–80); Paddington, New South Wales
- Occupation: Architect
- Known for: Lyne Park Harbour Baths, Rose Bay, New South Wales
- Parent(s): Frederick Squire and Mary Ann Tidswell (née

Thomas Tidswell was an Australian architect, notable for his design of sporting facilities in Sydney.

== Birth and education ==
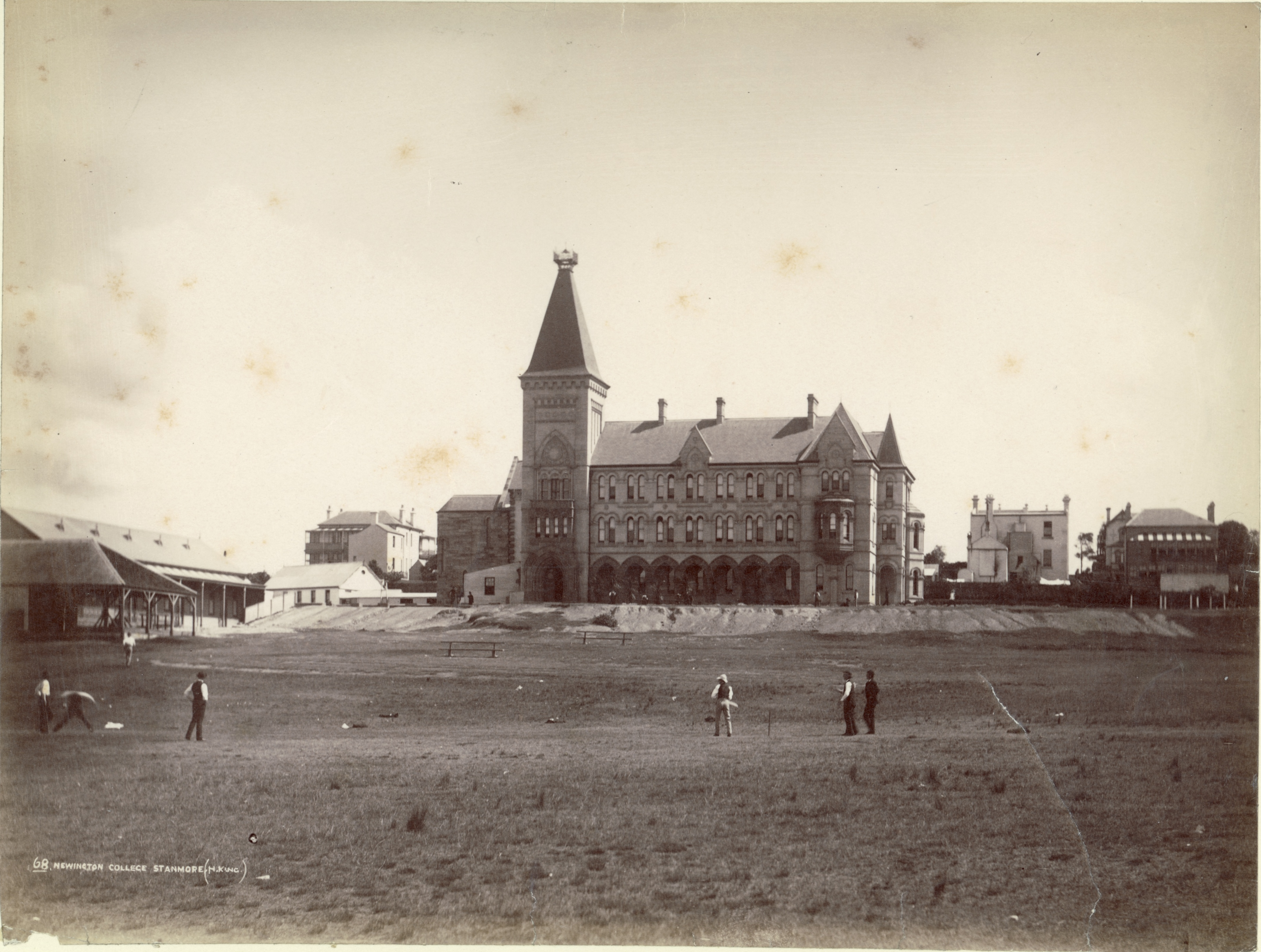
Newington College

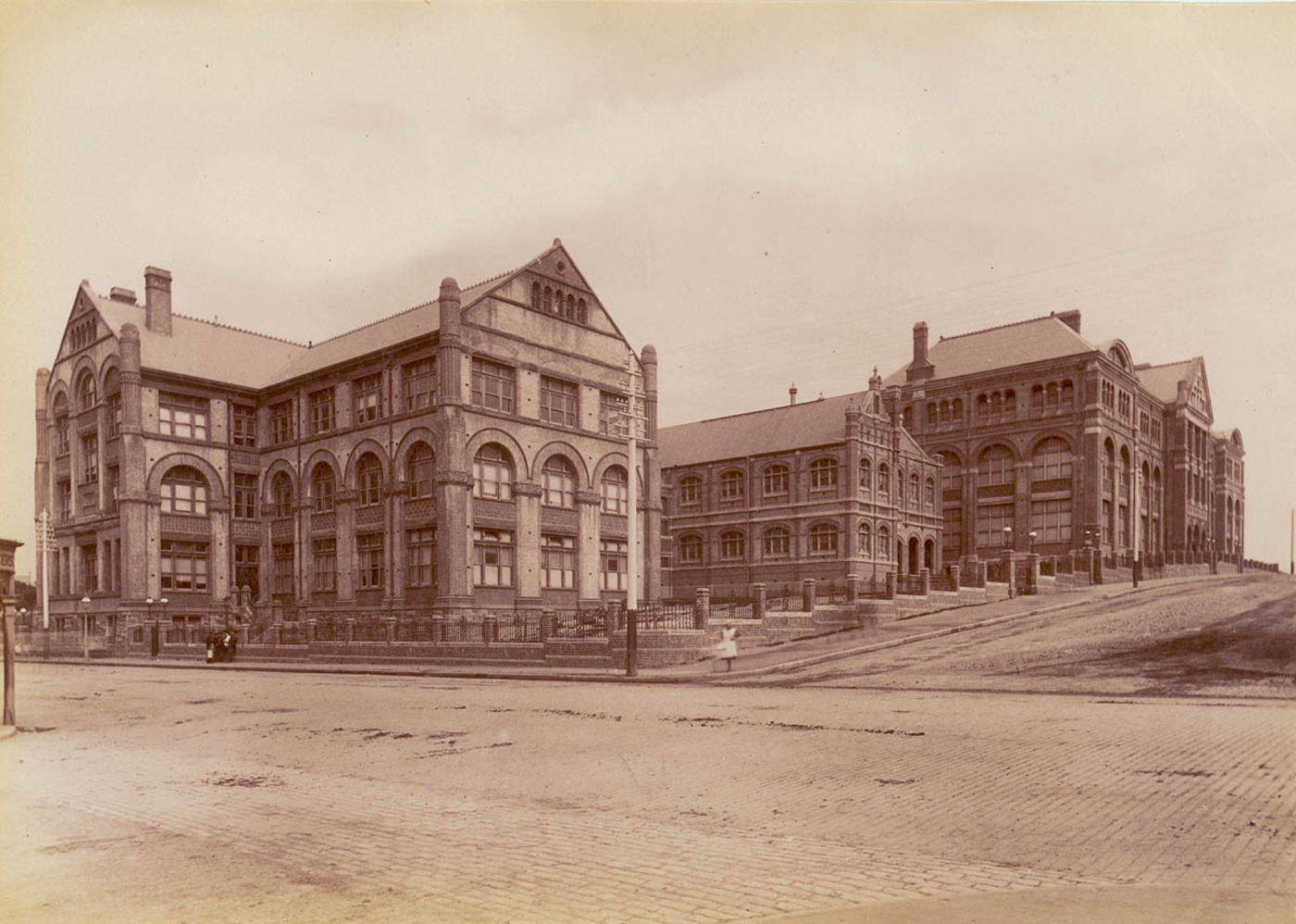
Sydney Technical College

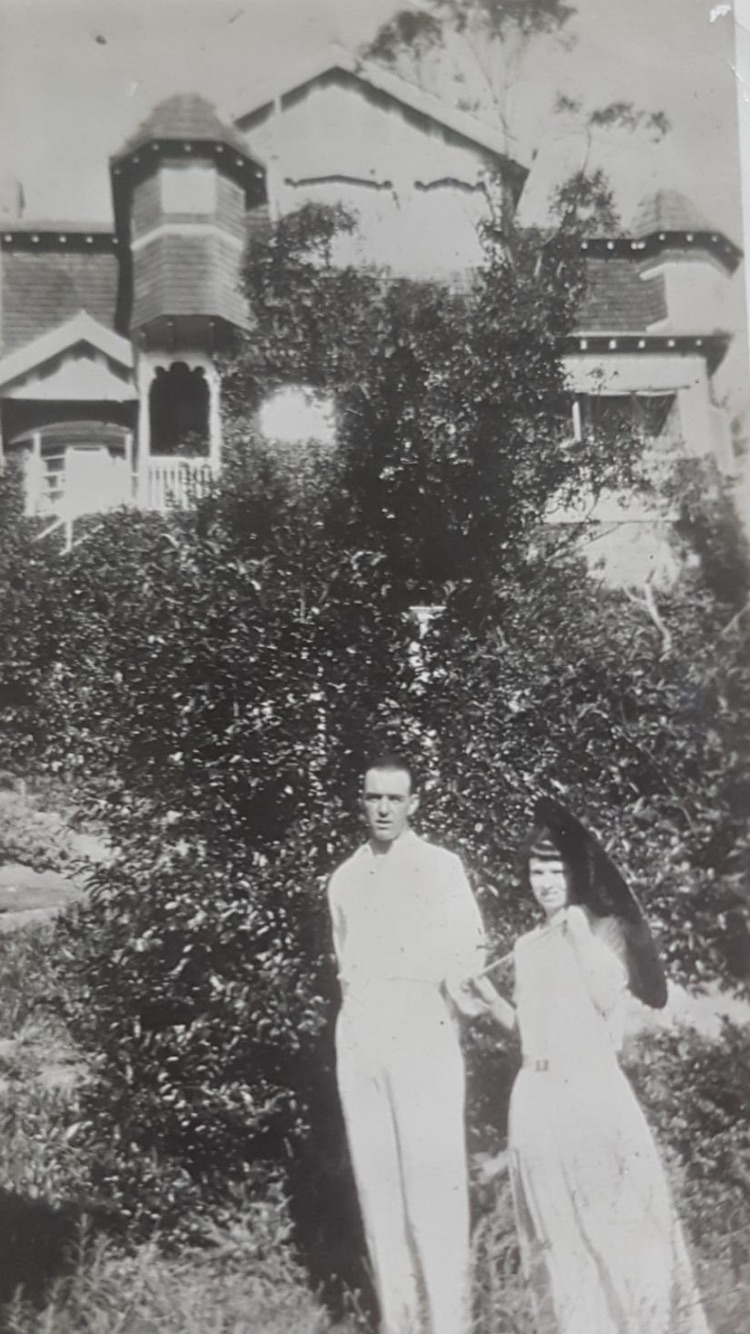
Quinton Tidswell and Jean Bellette in front of 29 Musgrave Street, Mosman, designed by Thomas Tidswell

Tidswell was born in Sydney, the sixth of nine children of hotelier Frederick Squire Tidswell (1831–1898) and his wife Mary Ann (1836–1912). The fourth child of the Tidswell family, Thomas Francis (1864–1866), had died in a tragic accident in front of his parents' hotel in Devonshire Street, Sydney, and the fifth and sixth children were named in his honour: Frank Tidswell (1867 – 1941) and Thomas Tidswell (1870–1950). He lived in rural New South Wales until his parents bought Nugal Hall in Randwick, New South Wales. Tidswell attended Newington College (1881–1886). After high school Tidswell was articled in architecture and studied at Sydney Technical College (STC). In 1890 he was awarded Honours in Design at STC.

== Architectural career ==
On entering the architectural profession Tidswell entered into partnership with Arthur Beckford Polin (1872-1961). One of the firm's early works was the design of the Mechanics Institute in Coonamble in rural NSW. Another was the enlargement of the Right Rev Dr Higgins, Roman Catholic Auxiliary-Bishop of Sydney’s residence Mount Eagle in Forbes Street Darlington.

Late in the 1890s Tidswell went into practice on his own using numerous premises until he took space in Challis House in Martin Place in Sydney. In this period he designed the buildings of the original Orange Hospital including general wards, isolation wards, a kitchen block and an operating theatre. These facilities were demolished in 1959.

In 1898 he designed a house at 33 Findlay Avenue, Roseville for Charles Starkey. The Presbyterian Church in Anderson Street in nearby Chatswood was designed by Tidswell and the building was opened on 17 December 1898. The front porch and facade are a newer addition but the body of the church remains as Chatswood Uniting Church. In 1902 he won second prize in a design competition for a new Town Hall in Deniliquin. In 1914 Tidswell designed a factory in Annandale for Starkeys who at the time were the largest ginger beer manufacturer in the Southern Hemisphere. The factory is now in Bridge Road, Stanmore and was restored and adapted into a complex of commercial and light industrial units. The development won the 2004 Marrickville Medal for Conservation which is awarded annually by Marrickville Council.

== Tidswell family houses ==
At the turn of the last century Tidswell designed family houses, and holiday houses, for himself and his brother. He designed his own home Greycliffs at 29 Musgrave Street, Mosman in 1899 and his brother’s house Deloraine on the northern tip of Point Piper in 1903. While the house still stands at 132 Wolseley Road, it has been substantially altered and is now known as Cordoba having been redesigned in a Spanish Revival style by the architects Esplin & Mould. The beautifully landscaped garden has been subdivided leading to the erection of a newer house on the water front at 132A. In the same era he designed a holiday house in the Blue Mountains for himself named Briar Hill at 41 Park Street, Glenbrook. The weatherboard house in late Federation and early Californian bungalow style has an Arts and Crafts inspired face brick inglenook and is on an extensive landscaped block. The house remained in the ownership of Tidswell family until this century and is an important element in the built environment of historic village of Glenbrook.

== Sporting faculties ==
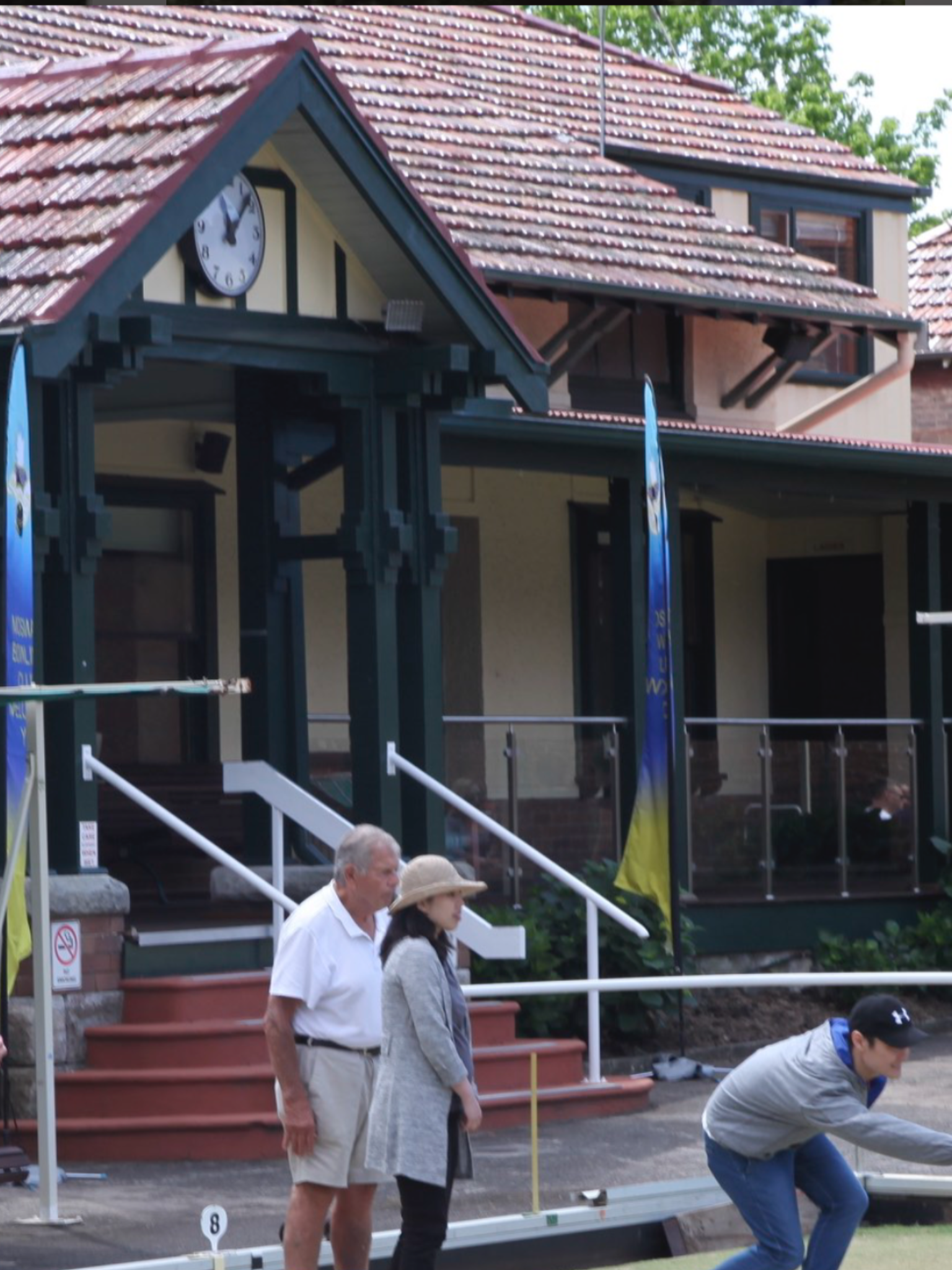
The new pavilion at Mosman Bowing Club was designed by Thomas Tidswell and opened in 1916.

=== Bowls and tennis ===
Having become a resident of Mosman, Tidswell started doing work for the Mosman Recreation Club, known as the Mosman Recreation Company. He designed a pavilion in 1901 which was replaced by a larger pavilion in 1916 to a design by Tidswell. As the honorary company architect he designed a six-rink bowling green, turf and asphalt tennis courts. Lawn bowls commenced with the completion of the greens in 1902 when the club was officially opened. Membership was exclusively for men and the Mosman Women’s Bowling Club was nearby and titled Mosman Park. Now known as Mosman Bowling Club the 1916 pavilion still stands at 15 Belmont Road, Mosman. It is now owned by Mosman Municipal Council.

=== Swimming and tennis ===
In 1902 a reserve named in honour of Sir William Lyne was reclaimed from tidal sand flats at Rose Bay and in 1904 harbour baths were designed by Tidswell. He designed the tennis centre for the New South Wales Lawn Tennis Association at its Double Bay Grounds. The centre hosted the Australasian Championships (now the Australian Open) and the International Lawn Tennis Challenge (now the Davis Cup) in both 1909 and 1919. In 1922 he designed the White City Stadium at Rushcutters Bay in 1922.

== Social milieu ==
After school, college and marriage Tidswell moved to the North Shore of Sydney and by 1900 he had built a large home with an expansive view of Sydney Harbour. As a sole practitioner he had an architectural studio in Challis House, Martin Place. In Mosman he was a member of the Mosman Recreation Club where his friend William Portus Cullen was the President. Tidswell designed the clubhouse. Cullen became Chief Justice of New South Wales, Lieutenant-Governor of New South Wales and Chancellor of the University of Sydney. His school friends, Old Newingtonians Herbert Curlewis and Percy Colquhoun, were also bowlers, tennis players and members of the recreation club and his neighbours in Mosman. Curlewis was a judge of the District Court of New South Wales and married to Ethel Turner, the author of Seven Little Australians. Colquhoun was a parliamentarian, lawyer and Inter-Colonial sportsman of note. For tennis they used the courts of the NSW Lawn Tennis Association where Tidswell had designed the clubhouse. They were joined by Tidswell's brother who lived on the eastern side of the harbour. Dr Frank Tidswell was a renowned physician who served as the Director of the Government Bureau of Microbiology and later as Director of Pathology at the Royal Alexandra Hospital for Children. Colquhoun was president of the New South Wales Lawn Tennis Association and he served as the first president of the Lawn Tennis Association of Australia in 1926. From 1913 until 1920 Colquhoun represented Mosman in the New South Wales Legislative Assembly. Sydney was a small and parochial city until World War II and this was Tidswell’s Protestant, professional and social milieu.

== Marriage and family ==
In 1895 Tidswell married Elsie Winifred Robinson and the marriage produced four sons:

- Frank was born in 1896 at his parents then residence Elsinore in Chatswood
- Noel was born in 1897 at his parents then residence Tooloon in Lindfield
- Squire was born in 1900 at his parents then residence at 29 Musgrave Street Mosman
- Quinton Tidswell was born in 1910 in Randwick

Frank and Noel both served in World War I and Noel was killed in action in 1918. In 1931 Frank and Squire were living in Wollongong and their mother was visiting. During a flash flood Elsie and Squire were swept away in the Minnamurra River at Jamberoo and Elsie died. The District Coroner returned a verdict of accidental death by drowning. Frank became a hotelier like his grandparents and owned the Lapstone Hotel in Glenbrook. Squire remained on the South Coast of New South Wales and married. Squire died in 1980. Quinton Tidswell became an artist renowned for his works on paper. He moved to Victoria and died in Wangaratta in 1991.
