= John Tidwell (politician) =

American politician (born 1941)

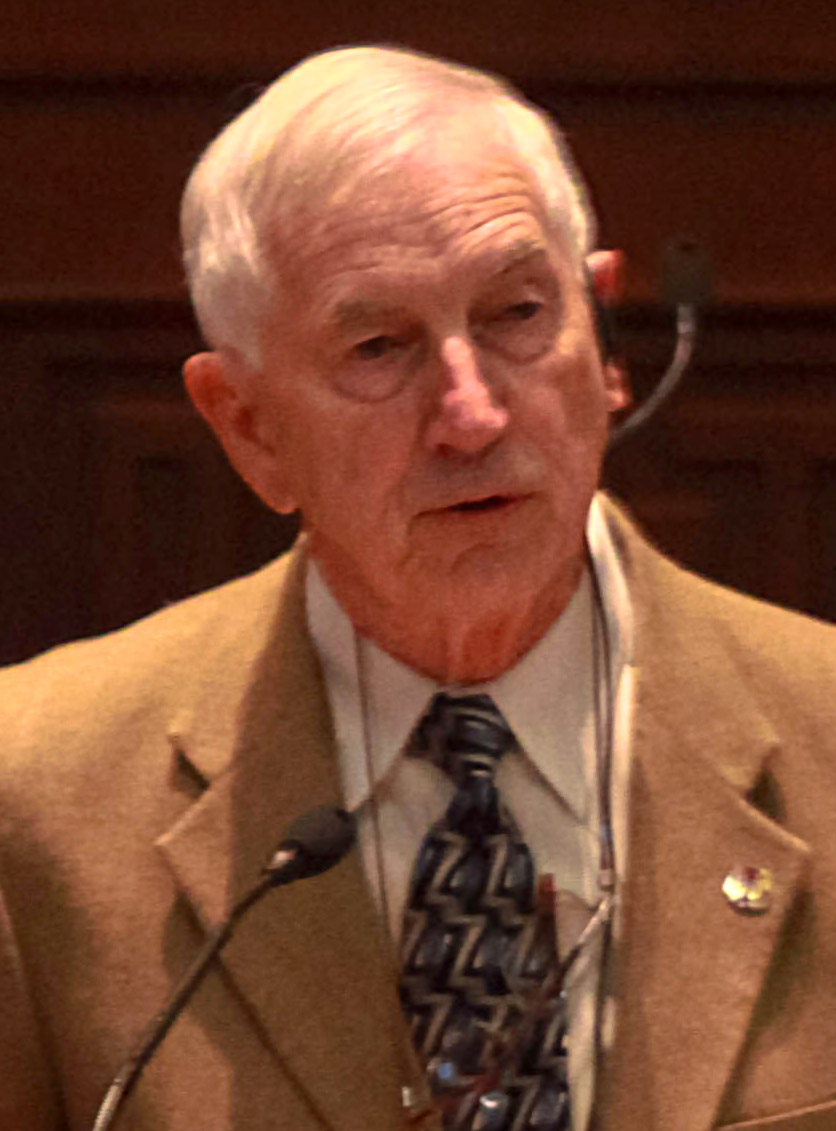
- Tidwell in 2014

Member of the Tennessee House of Representatives from the 74th district
- In office January 1997 – January 2015
- Succeeded by: Jay Reedy

Personal details
- Born: August 15, 1941 (age 85)
- Party: Democratic
- Education: University of Tennessee

John C. Tidwell (born August 15, 1941) is an American politician and a former Democratic member of the Tennessee House of Representatives, representing District 74 from January 1997 until January 2015.

== Education ==
Tidwell attended Castle Heights Military Academy (since closed) and earned his BS in civil engineering from the University of Tennessee.

== Elections ==
- 1996: Tidwell was initially elected in the 1996 Democratic Primary and the November 5, 1996 General election.
- 1998: Tidwell was unopposed for the August 6, 1998 Democratic Primary, winning with 6,733 votes, and won the November 3, 1998 General election with 7,209 votes (58.7%) against Republican nominee Charles Musick.
- 2000: Tidwell was unopposed for both the August 3, 2000 Democratic Primary, winning with 3,773 votes, and the November 7, 2000 General election, winning with 14,468 votes.
- 2002: Tidwell was unopposed for the August 1, 2002 Democratic Primary, winning with 6,837 votes, and won the November 5, 2002 General election with 9,744 votes (61.4%) against Republican nominee Carl Hewitt.
- 2004: Tidwell was unopposed for both the August 5, 2004 Democratic Primary, winning with 3,094 votes, and the November 2, 2004 General election, winning with 14,979 votes.
- 2006: Tidwell was unopposed for both the August 3, 2006 Democratic Primary, winning with 7,257 votes, and the November 7, 2006 General election, winning with 13,871 votes.
- 2008: Tidwell was unopposed for both the August 7, 2008 Democratic Primary, winning with 2,543 votes (92.3%), and the November 4, 2008 General election, winning with 15,499 votes.
- 2010: Tidwell was unopposed for the August 5, 2010 Democratic Primary, and won the November 2, 2010 General election with 9,650 votes (99.2%) against two write-in candidates.
- 2012: Tidwell was unopposed for the August 2, 2012 Democratic Primary, winning with 2,884 votes, and won the November 6, 2012 General election with 9,356 votes (52.6%) against Republican nominee Lauri Day.
- 2014: Tidwell was unopposed in the primary election, and lost re-election to Republican Jay Reedy in the November general election with 4,987 votes (48%) to Reedy's 5,401 (52%).
