= Frank Tidswell =

Australian physician (1867 - 1941)

Frank Tidswell MB ChM (Syd) DPH (Camb)
- Born: Francis Tidswell; 1867; Sydney New South Wales
- Died: 26 February 1941 (aged 73–74); Paddington, New South Wales
- Occupations: Pathologist, Director of the Government Bureau of Microbiology
- Known for: Snake venom research Bubonic plague research
- Parent(s): Fred and Mary Ann Tidswell; The Hon. Richard Jones MLC (Father-in-law)

Francis (Frank) Tidswell (1867 – 26 February 1941) was an Australian physician who served as the Director of the Government Bureau of Microbiology, New South Wales from 1908 until 1913. In this role he has been noted as "a pathologist of distinction who never sublimated his personality to his public service role." From 1925, until his death in 1941, Tidswell was the Director of Pathology at the Royal Alexandra Hospital for Children in Sydney. In an obituary, The Medical Journal of Australia wrote of him as an "extremely clear thinker, young in mind and receptive of new ideas. In his gentleness of manner, and quiet courtesy, the [children's] hospital has lost a most valued specialist." Tidswell is considered one of Australia's pioneering microbiologists.

== Birth and education ==
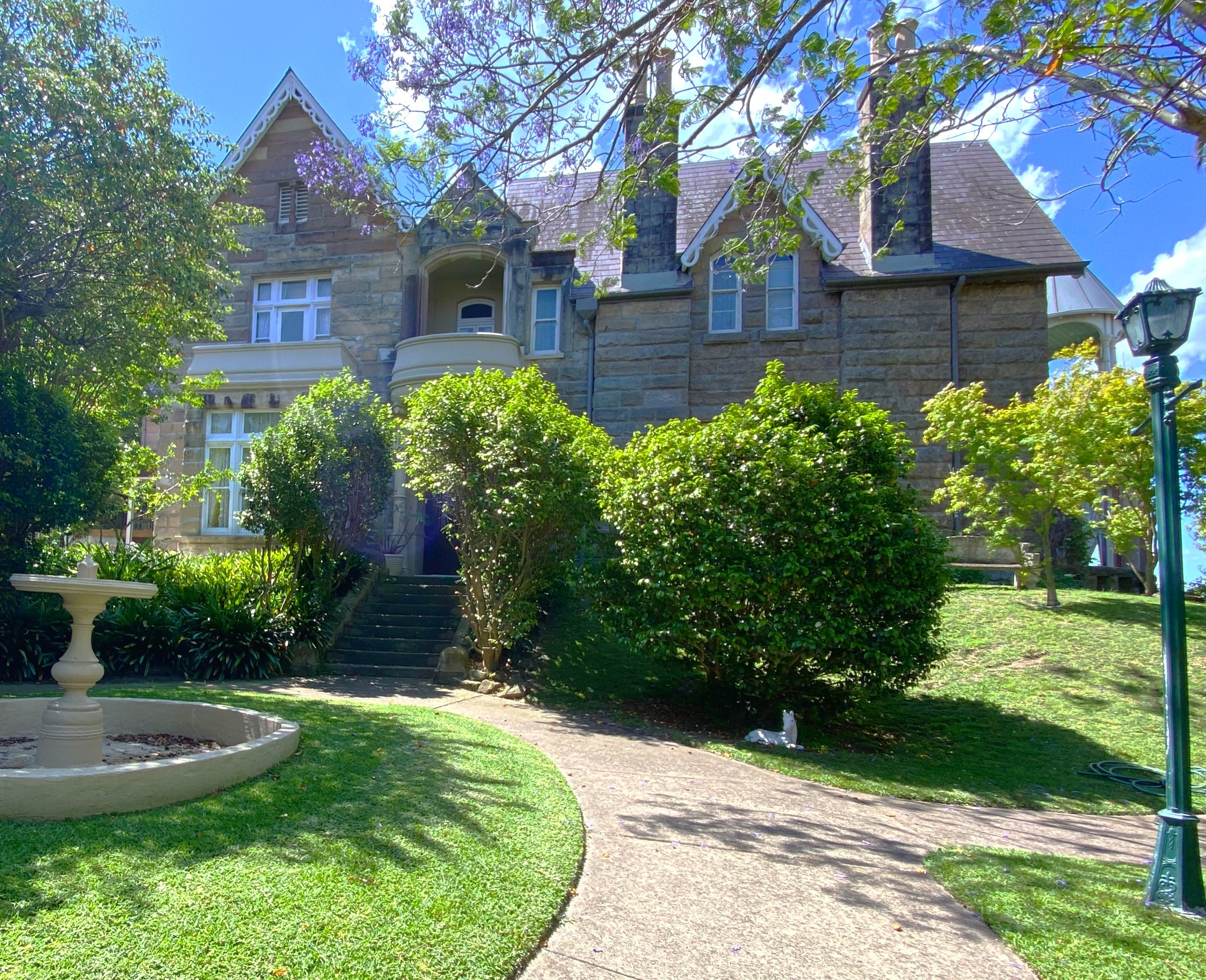
Nugal Hall, Randwick, was Tidswell's home in his teenage years

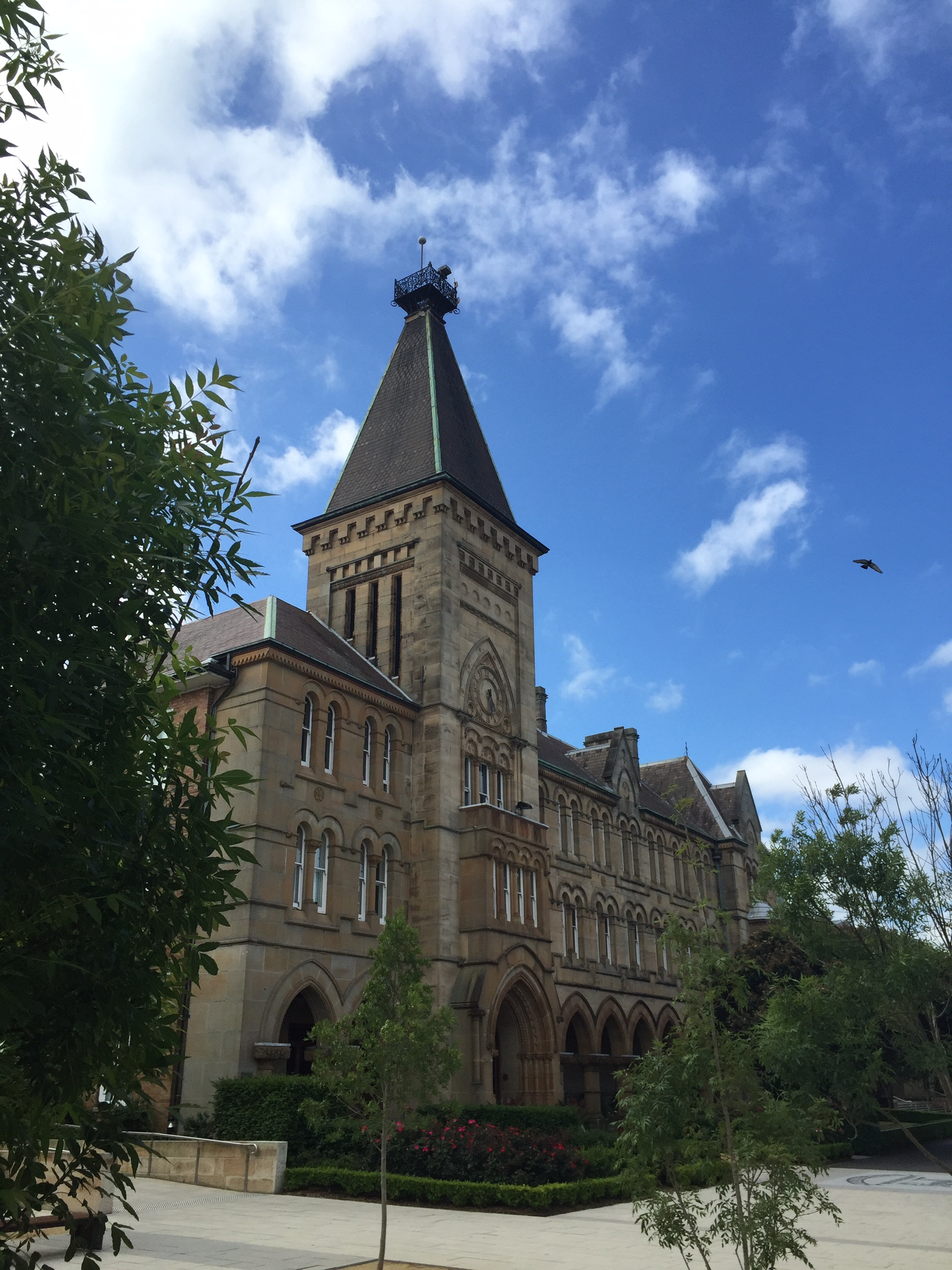
The 1881 Founders' Wing was opened the year Tidswell commenced his education at Newington College

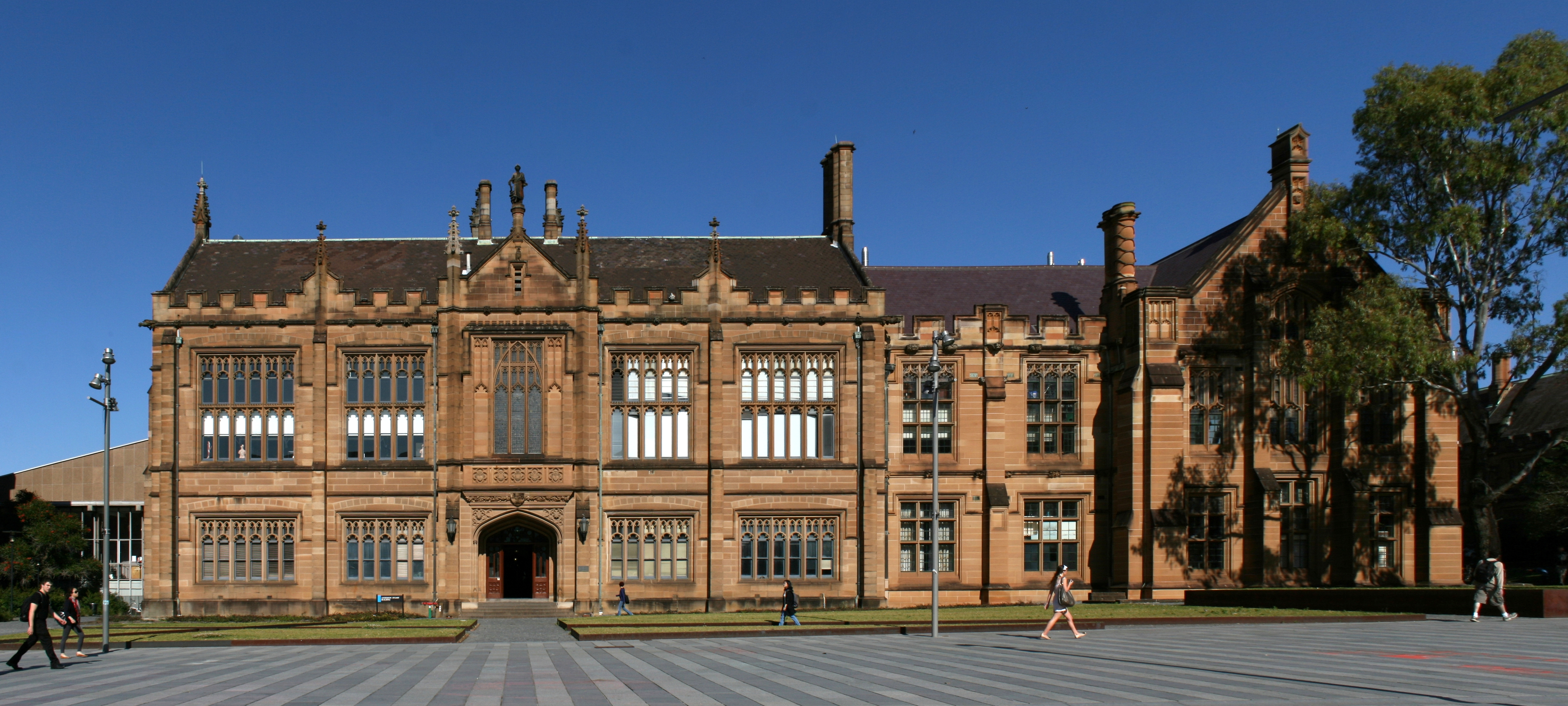
The Anderson Stuart Building at Sydney University where Tidswell studied and taught medicine

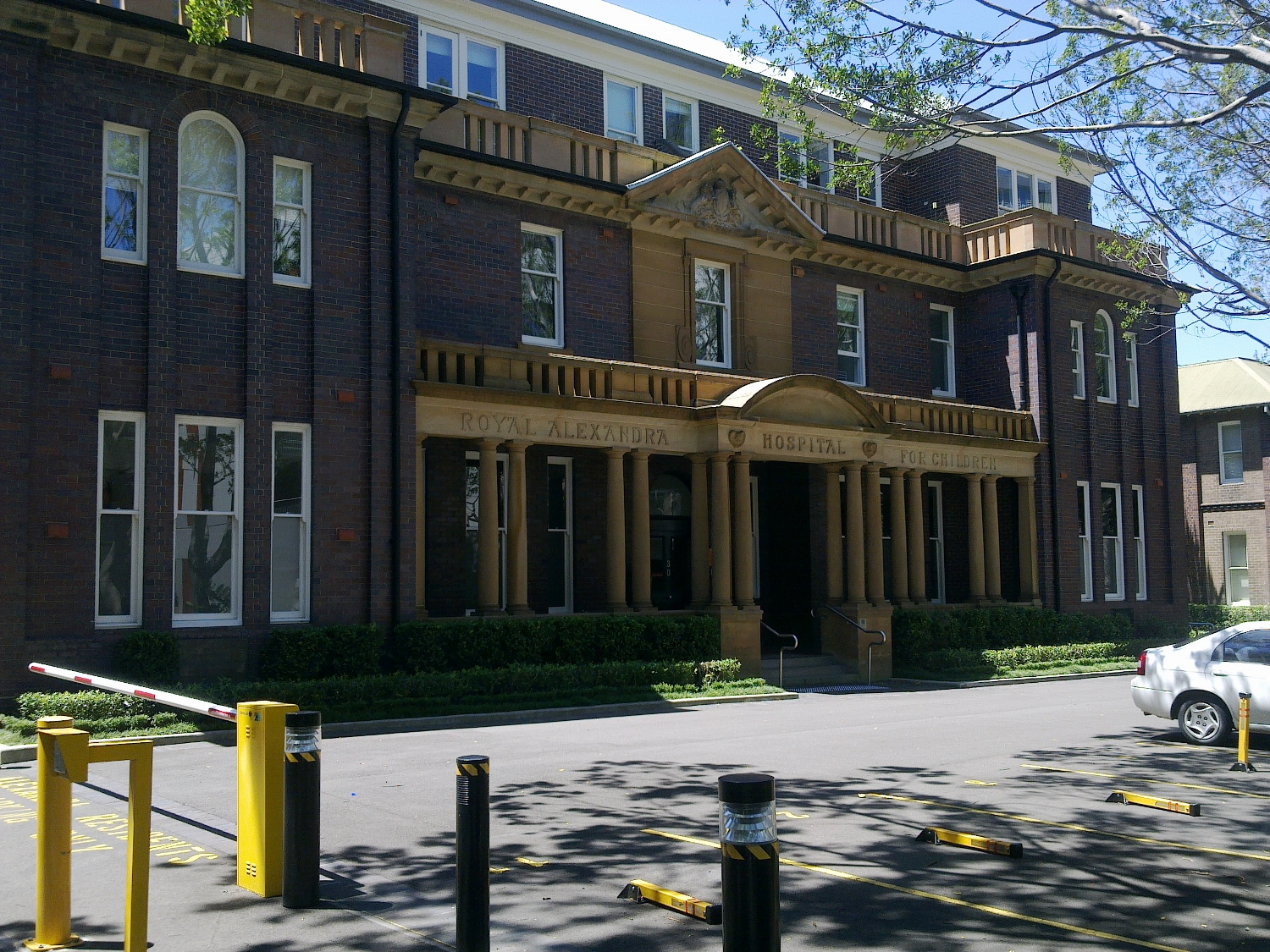
The Royal Alexandria Hospital for Children at Camperdown where Tidswell was Director of Pathology for 28 years

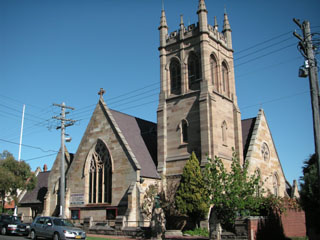
St Paul's Anglican Church, Burwood, where Tidswell married Millie Jones in 1902

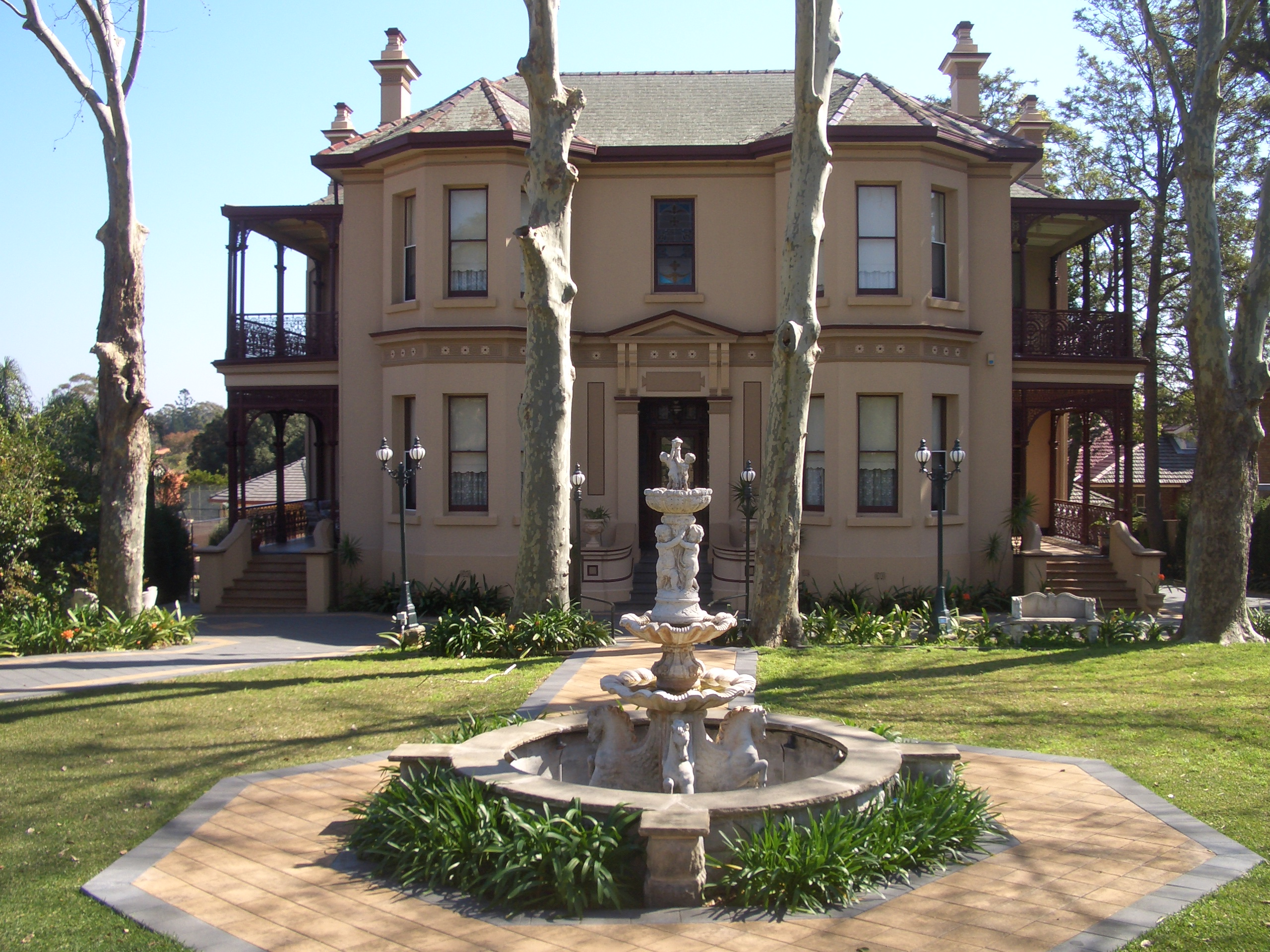
Gayton, Burwood, where the Tidswell and Jones wedding reception was held

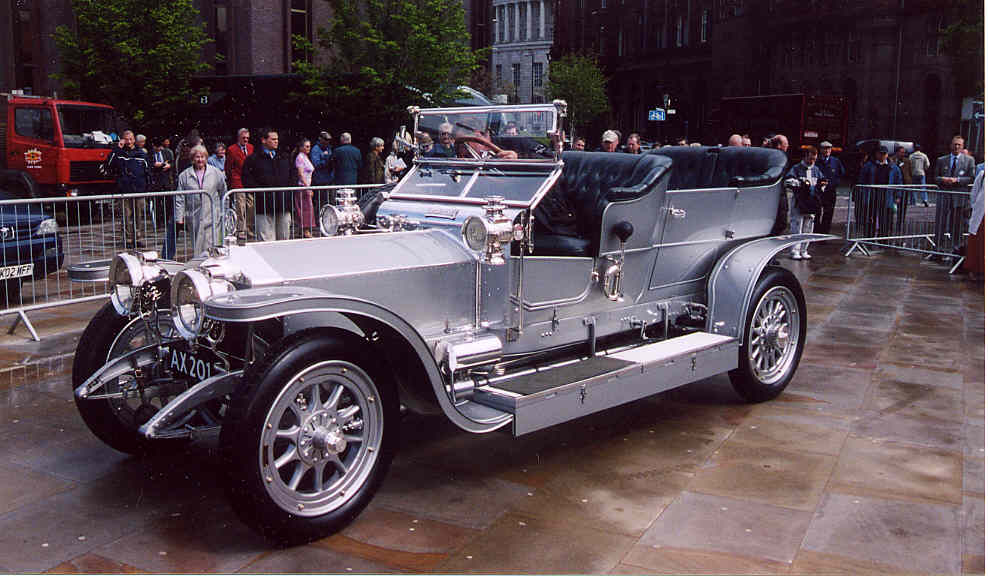
A Rolls-Royce Silver Ghost open tourer of the style bought by Tidswell in 1912

Tidswell was born in Sydney, the fifth of nine children born to Frederick Squire Tidswell (1831–1898) and his wife Mary Ann (1836–1912). The fourth child, Francis Thomas Tidswell (1864–1866) had died the year before his birth and the sixth child was the architect Thomas Tidswell (1870–1950). He was raised in rural NSW until the age of 13 when his family moved to Sydney. Fred Tidswell owned the Coogee Bay Hotel and bought Nugal Hall the Mortimer Lewis designed home in Milford Street Randwick and members of the family lived there until 1903. Tidswell attended Newington College (1881–1884) and then went up to the University of Sydney graduating as a Bachelor of Medicine and Chemistry in 1892. He then studied at University College, London, and was awarded a D.P.H., by the University of Cambridge in 1893.

== Early medical career ==
Upon graduation, Tidswell occupied a position in the New South Wales Department of Health and then in 1897 was appointed as Demonstrator of Physiology at the University of Sydney and so at a young age he was a principal teacher in a medical subject before the establishment of a chair.

== Research ==
In 1898, Tidswell carried out extensive research on snake venom. He also experimented on the immunisation of horses with tiger snake venom by gradually increasing the quantity of venom injected into the animal until it was capable of withstanding what would at first have been sufficient to kill it. He then set out to determine the quantity of the serum, which he had obtained from the immunised horse, that was required to neutralise this venom – that is, to destroy its effect upon the animal into which he had injected it. Tidswell found that not only did his anti-venene give a high degree of protection against the venom of the tiger snake, but also that the protective effect could be obtained even many hours after the venom had been at work. This is characteristic of the modern anti-venene, that it produces dramatic, almost miraculous, effects upon patients who may have been bitten many hours before the anti-venene can be administered, and who may already have collapsed and be beyond all hope of recovery by any other treatment.

== Board of Health ==
John Ashburton Thompson, as Chief Medical Officer in NSW, appointed Tidswell as Bacteriologist to the fledgling public health department. Thompson, Tidswell and William George Armstrong went on to produce important research on plague and are credited with developing 20th century scientific understandings of plague, in particular that Yersinia pestis is spread to humans by fleas from infected rats. Their work was a large part of a revolution of social medicine in Australia. The knowledge that infectious diseases could be spread from one human to another by insects and that infection could be derived from animals, brought public health into scientific scrutiny. The outbreak also led to further improvements being made to the North Head Quarantine Station as the value of segregating infected patients from the populace had been realised. As Principal Assistant Medical Officer, Tidswell also filled the role of Microbiologist from 1 January 1898 until 1 July 1908 when the Bureau of Microbiology was established.

== Pathologist ==
With the creation of the Ministry of Health in 1913, Tidswell resigned and entered private practice. In 1925 he was appointed Director of Pathology at the Royal Alexandra Hospital for Children. The hospital's centenary history states: "As a boy Tidswell had been brought up in the country and taught to respect people for their work rather than their rank. At the Hospital he had a loyal staff who regarded him with the greatest respect and affection. He firmly held that on the job rank was necessary but out of the hospital it did not matter and he would raise his hat courteously to the lowliest employee." In the later years of his career he worked a three-day week dividing his time between Sydney and the Southern Highlands.

== Marriage and family life ==
In 1902, Tidswell married Edith Millie Jones, the third daughter of The Hon. Richard Jones MLC, of Gayton Burwood. The wedding ceremony was performed at St. Paul's Anglican Church Burwood, followed by a reception at the Jones family home on Burwood Road. The marriage produced one daughter, Marjorie Squire Tidswell (1904–1992). The couple built a home, Deloraine, on the northern tip of Point Piper in 1903 to a design by Tidswell’s brother the architect Thomas. Tidswell's knowledge of trees, flowers and soils led to him being a keen gardener. While the house still stands at 132 Wolseley Road, it has been substantially altered and is now known as Cordoba having been redesigned in a Spanish Revival style by the architects Esplin & Mould. The beautifully landscaped garden has been subdivided leading to the erection of a newer house on the water front at 132A. From the 1930s, the Tidswells lived at their historic 1860s farmhouse, Farnborough on the Illawarra Highway just out of MMoss Vale, where they developed another important garden and bred draught horses. The garden is now opened to the public by its current owners. Tidswell was a man of considerable private and professional means and was an early motoring enthusiast. In 1912 he purchased a Rolls-Royce Silver Ghost that was fitted with a high-sided Torpedo Phaeton body by coachbuilder Barker. The car was used sparingly by Tidswell but after new owner's and a period of dereliction it has been restored and when offered at auction in England in 2003 it was estimated to be worth between £180,000 and £220,000.
