= Frank P. Lashlee =

American politician

Frank P. Lashlee (June 30, 1937 – June 18, 2008) was a Tennessee politician and a member of the Tennessee General Assembly. He was a Democrat.

== Biography ==
Lashlee was born June 30, 1937, in Camden, Tennessee, to John W. and Mildred Jolly Lashlee, members of one of Tennessee's most politically prominent families. Both of his parents had been Tennessee State Senators, and his father, grandfather, great-grandfather and great-great uncle had served in the Tennessee House of Representatives and held various Benton County elective offices. His brother, John, was a prominent television sportscaster on WTVF Channel 5 in Nashville who served on the Nashville city council.

An insurance agent, Lashlee was first elected to the Tennessee House of Representatives in 1972, where he served five terms. He moved to the upper house in 1982, being elected to the Tennessee Senate from the 25th District, and served there until 1990.

Lashlee died of heart failure on June 18, 2008, at his home in Brentwood, Tennessee. He was survived by his wife, Sandra McMinn Lashlee of Brentwood, son Frank P. Lashlee, Jr of Manchester TN, Brett W Lashlee of Camden, TN and Bryan B Lashlee of Mt Juliet, TN., and daughters Bridgette Lashlee of Kenai, AK and Patricia Lashlee Vick of Camden, TN, 15 grandchildren and one great-grandchild. He is buried at Woodlawn Cemetery in Nashville.
