= List of Watford F.C. players (1–49 appearances) =

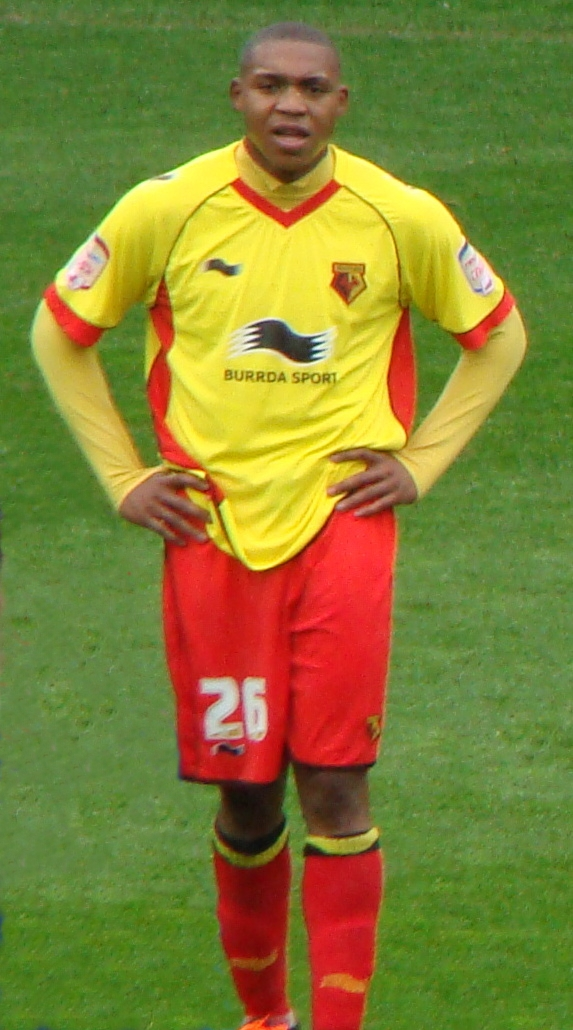
Academy graduate Britt Assombalonga made his Watford debut in 2012.

Watford Football Club is an English association football club, based in Watford, Hertfordshire. The club's history can be traced back to 1881; it took its current name in 1898, following the merger of West Hertfordshire and Watford St. Mary's. Since moving from a ground in Cassio Road in 1922, they have played their home matches at Vicarage Road stadium.

Many players have contributed significantly to the history of the club, despite playing a relatively small number of games. Paul Atkinson, Mo Johnston and Neil Price all featured for Watford in the 1984 FA Cup Final. Nick Wright scored the opening goal in Watford's 2–0 win over Bolton in the 1999 Football League First Division play-off final, a game that Israel international Alon Hazan also participated in. Several players have gone on to become Premier League footballers following successful loan spells at Watford, including Chris Eagles and England international Adam Johnson; others such as Alexandre Bonnot and Steve Brooker played their only top division games in English football with Watford. In the 2009–10 season, on-loan Tom Cleverley became the first person to win the club's Player of the Season award having made fewer than 50 Watford appearances. Others made significant contributions to the club after their careers ended. Examples include Ron Gray, who managed the club after he retired as a player, and Price, who at various points commentated on the club's matches for the BBC, worked for the club, and formed the Watford Former Players' Association.

This list contains players who have made 49 or fewer competitive appearances for Watford. It includes appearances and goals in the Premier League, Football League, Southern Football League, FA Cup, Football League Cup, Football League Trophy, Full Members Cup, UEFA Cup and the Anglo-Italian Cup. Appearances and goals in other competitions or non-competitive matches are not included. The table does not include appearances and goals from 1939–1940, when the season was abandoned after three matches due to the Second World War. Two players—Billy Law and Tom Postlethwaite—made their only competitive appearances for the club in this season, and are therefore not listed. International appearances and goals given are for the senior national team only. Where a player represented his country, but not at full international level, details are given in the notes column.

== Key ==
Current players' statistics correct as of 23 May 2026.

| Symbol | Meaning |
|---|---|
| ‡ | Contracted to Watford as a player at some stage in the 2014–15 season. |
| † | Won the Player of the Season award. |
| [PM] | Spent time as player-manager |
| * | Player holds club record(s) |
| Apps | Number of appearances for Watford |

== Players ==
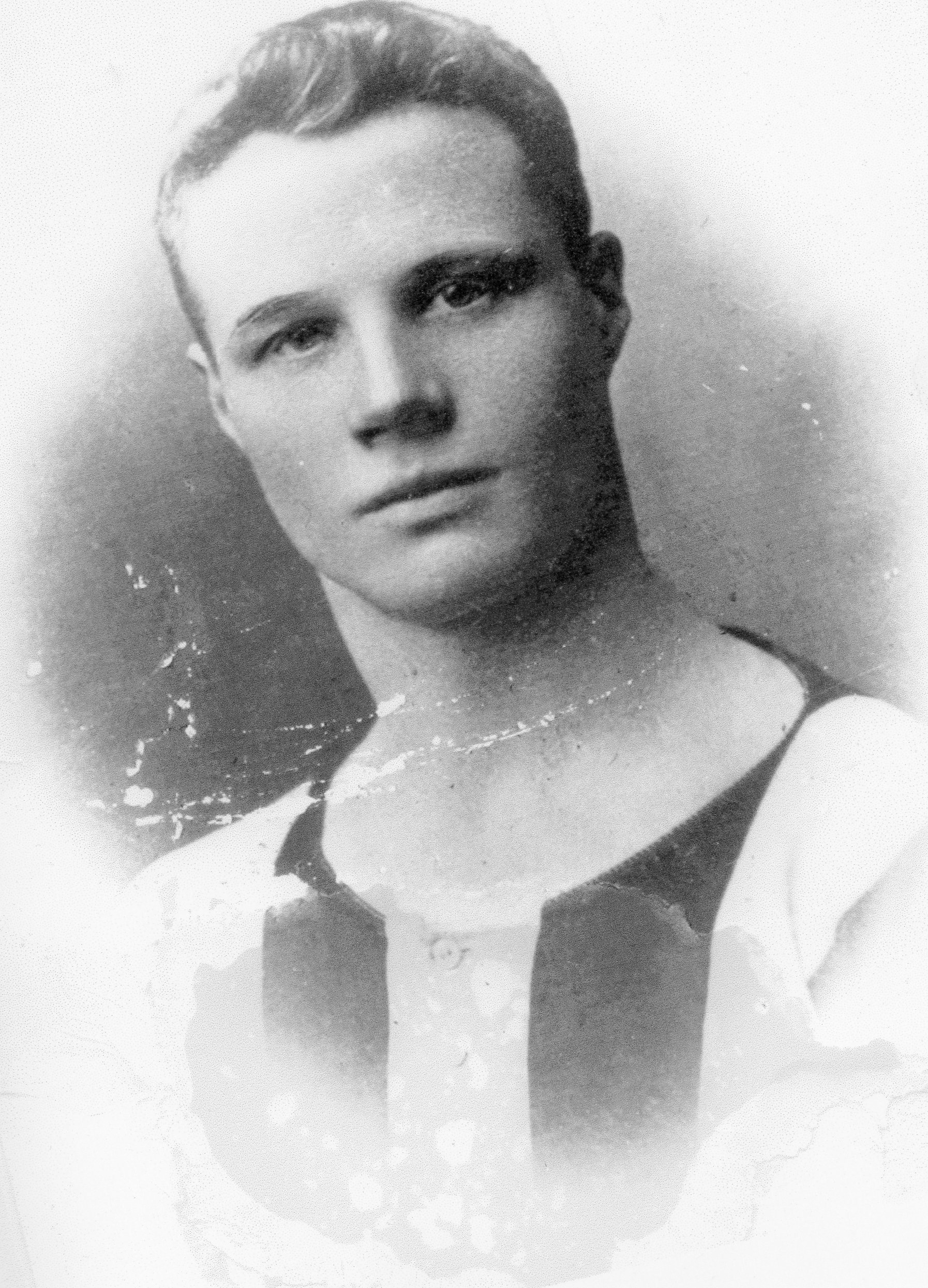
England international James Bagshaw played for Watford towards the end of his career.

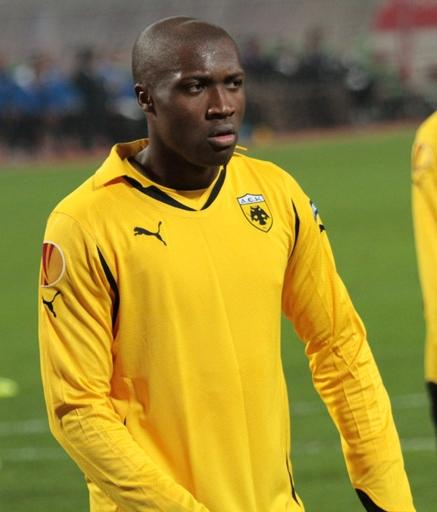
Steve Leo Beleck was one of the first players to join Watford on loan from Udinese

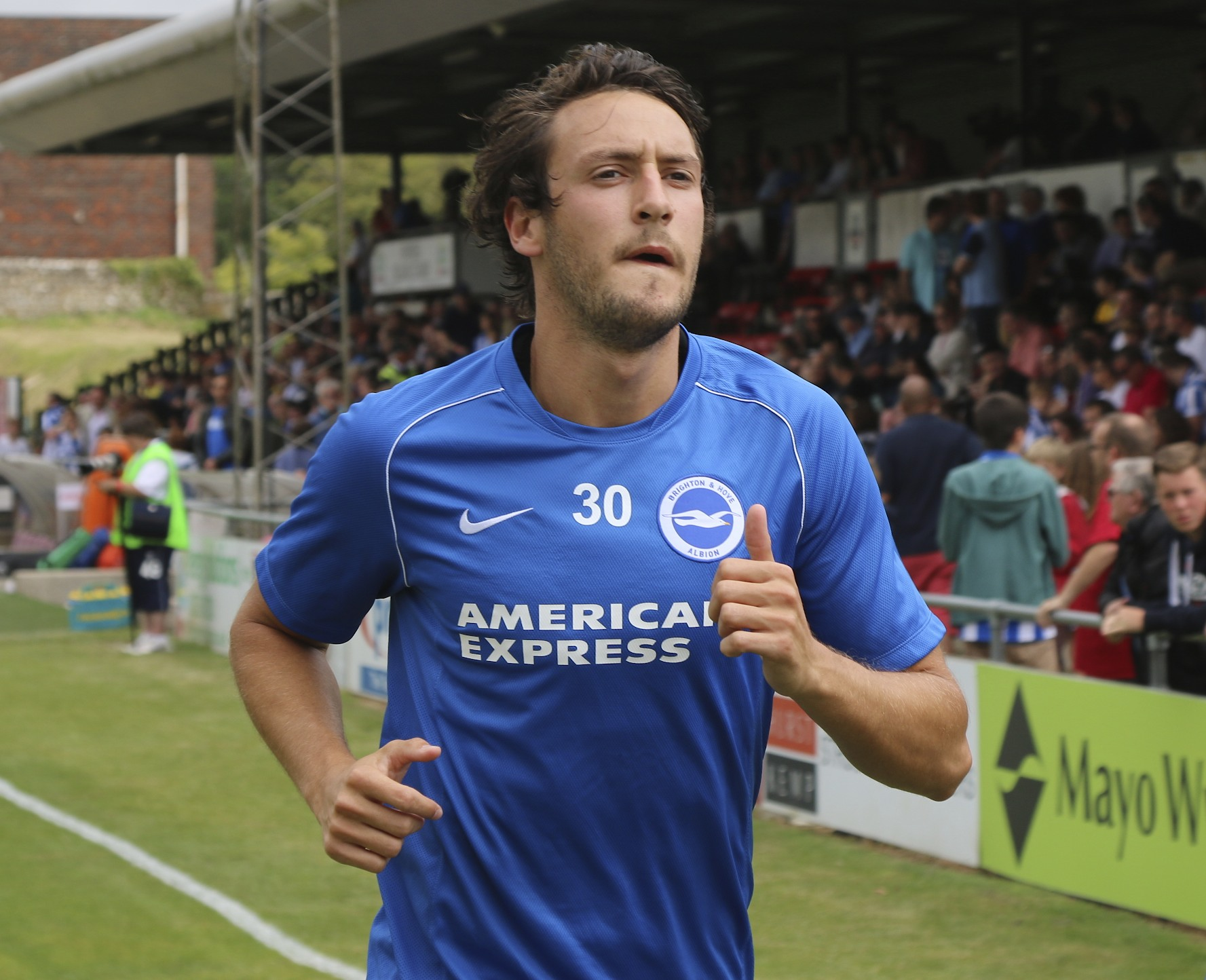
Watford sold Will Buckley to Brighton & Hove Albion in 2011 for £1m – Brighton's record transfer fee.

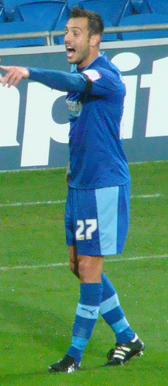
Wing back Marco Cassetti

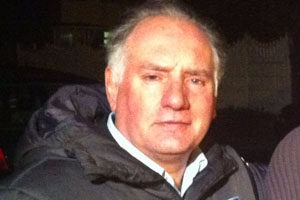
Alan Devonshire played 27 games for Watford, after spending the majority of his career at West Ham United.

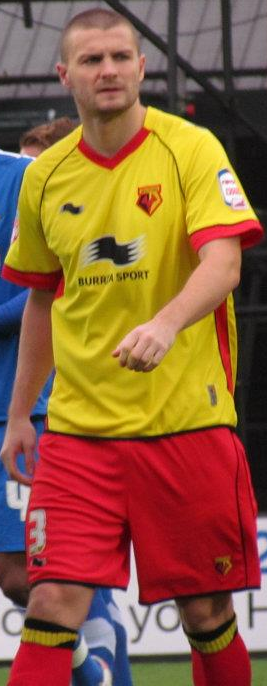
Defender Carl Dickinson joined Watford in 2011

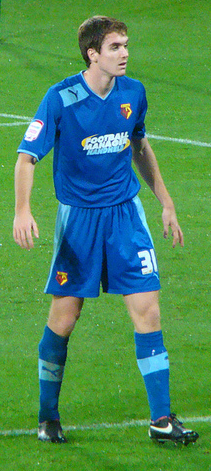
Defender Tommie Hoban

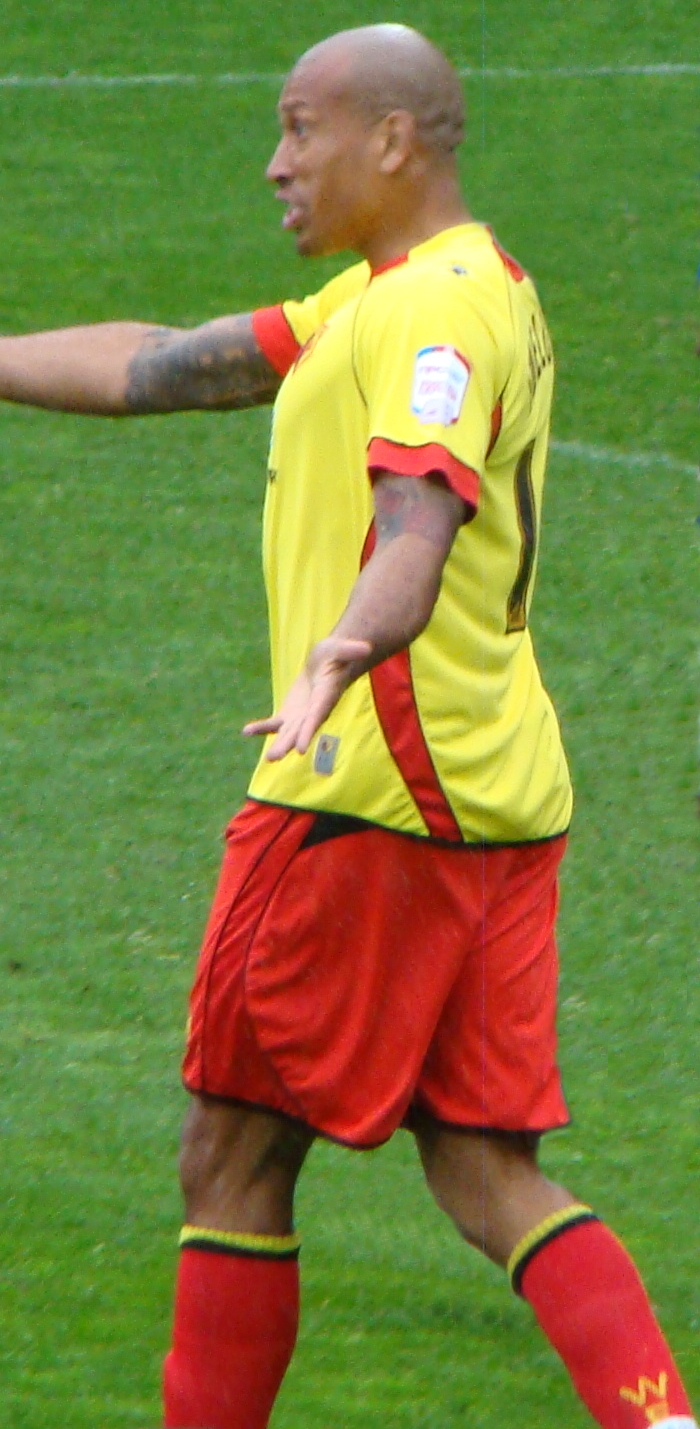
Scotland striker Chris Iwelumo joined Watford in 2011.

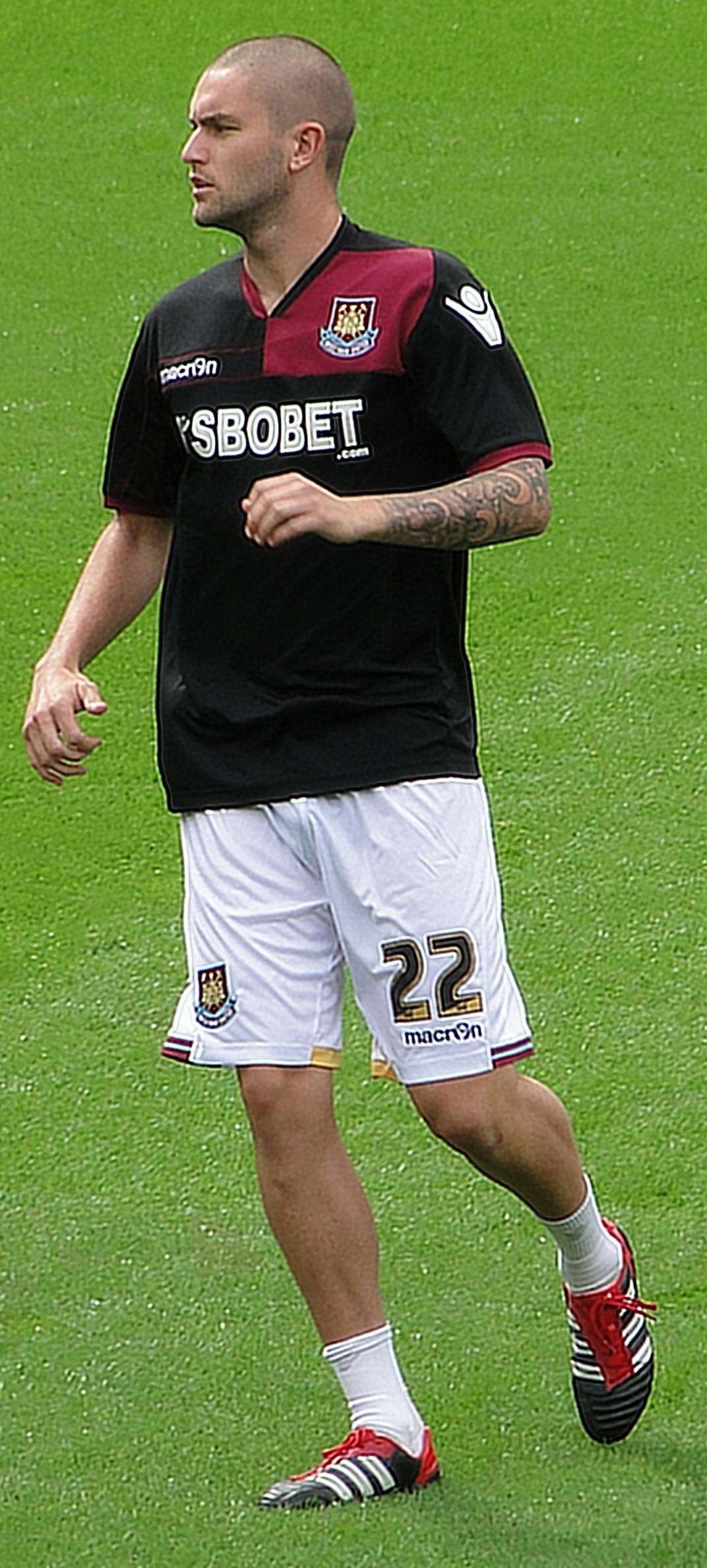
Henri Lansbury spent the 2009–10 season on loan to Watford from Arsenal.

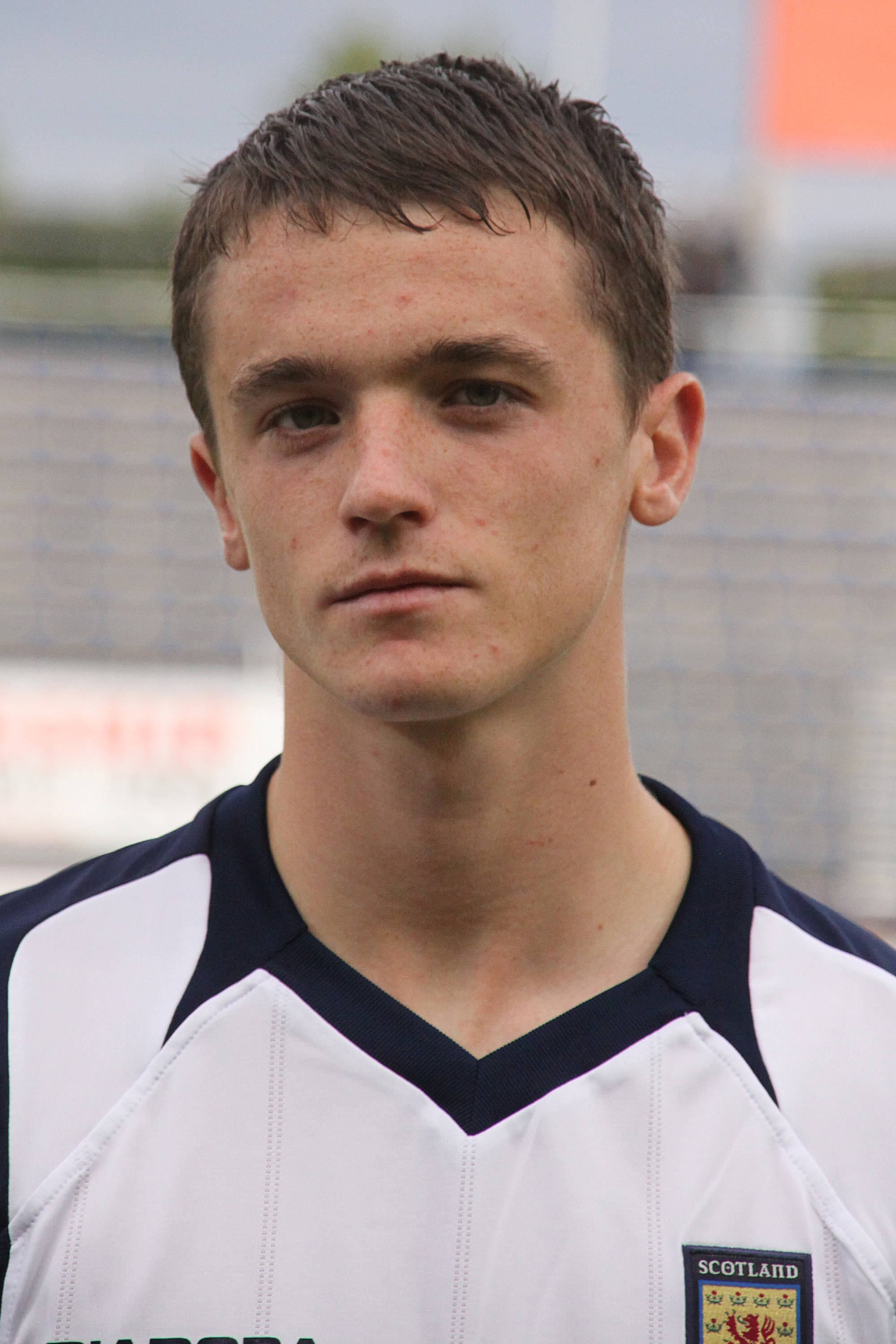
Stephen McGinn playing for Scotland under-21s.

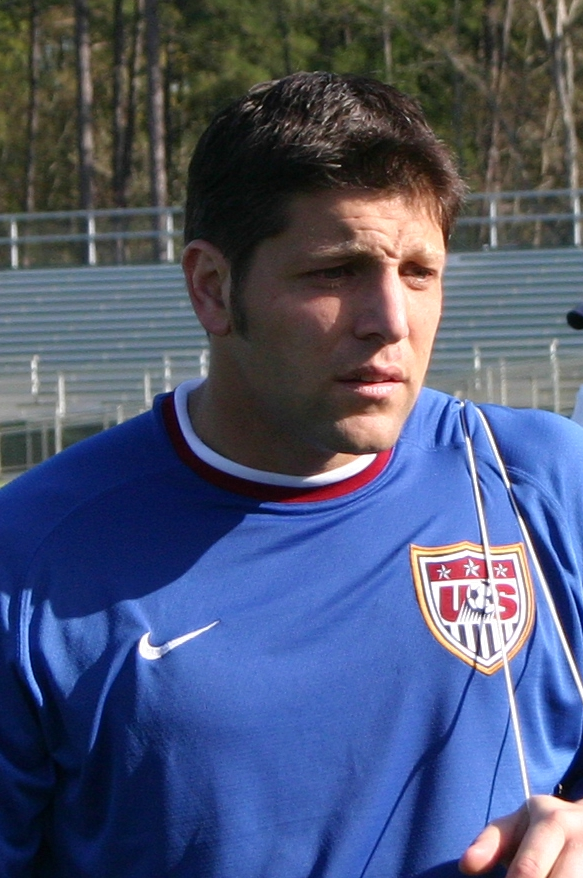
USA international goalkeeper Tony Meola made a solitary Watford appearance in 1990.

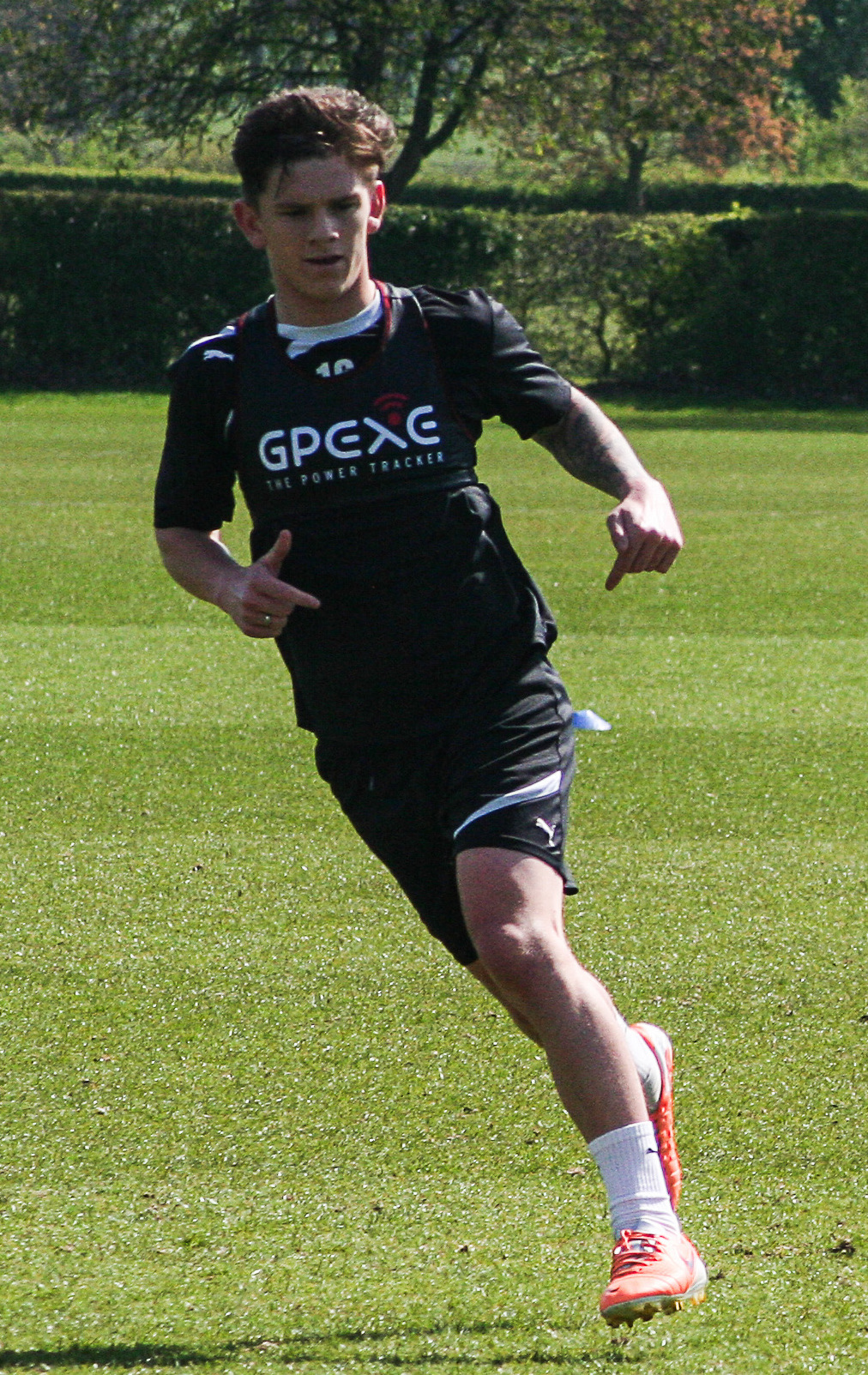
Academy graduate Sean Murray made his first-team debut at the end of the 2010–11 season.

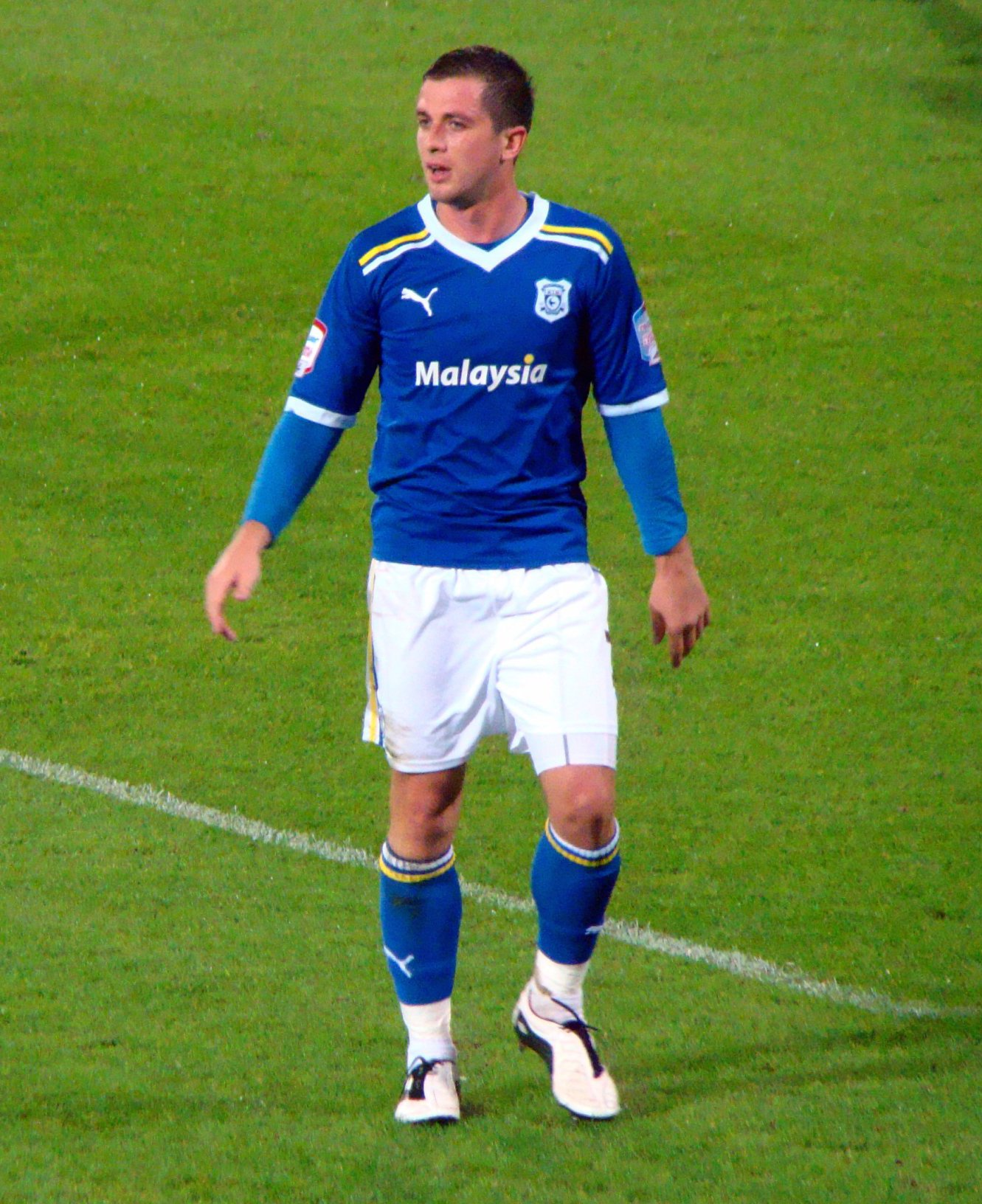
Defender Andrew Taylor scored the first goal of his professional career in 2011, while on loan to Watford from Middlesbrough.

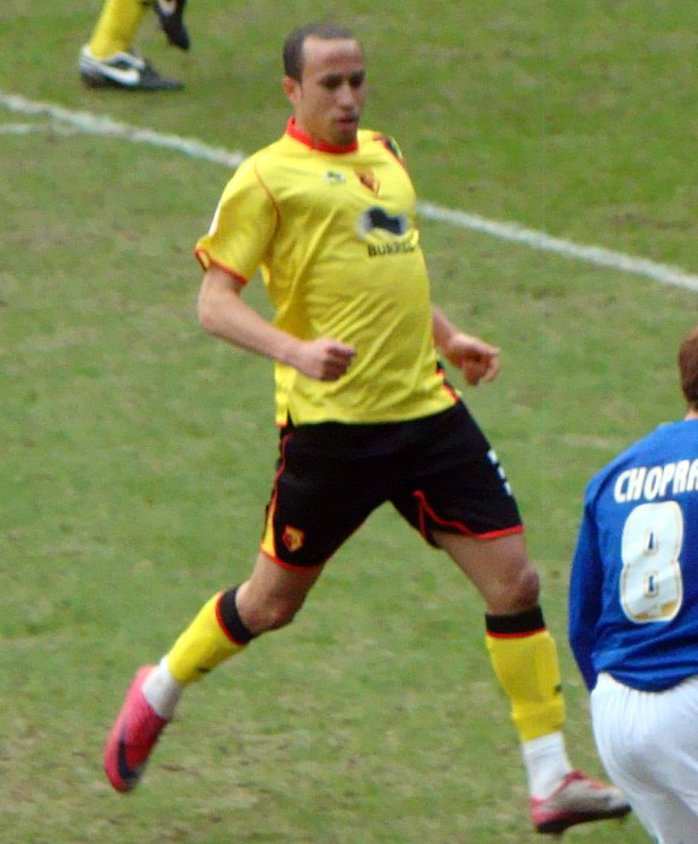
Andros Townsend has played for several clubs on loan from Tottenham, including Watford.

| Name | Position | Years at Watford (Note: Years given denote the span between a player's first and last peacetime appearance—they do not take into account appearances for Watford while peacetime competitions were suspended due to the First and Second World Wars. Where a player spent multiple periods at the club, these periods are denoted as multiple ranges of years.) | Apps | Goals | International honours (Note: Where a player did not compete internationally, no country is denoted. Only the highest level of international competition is given, except where a player competed for more than one country, in which case the highest level for each country is shown. Between 1926 and 1950, two competing teams claimed to represent the island of Ireland. denotes players who played for the Irish Football Association team. denotes players who played for the Football Association of Ireland team. For more information, see Ireland national football team (1882–1950) and Republic of Ireland national football team.) | Notes/refs |
|---|---|---|---|---|---|---|
| Javier Acuña | FW | 2013 | 12 | 1 | Paraguay under-20 | — |
| Laurie Adams | FW | 1952 | 1 | 0 | None | — |
| Tony Agana | MF/FW | 1987–1988 | 20 | 3 | England | (Note: Represented England at semi-professional level.) |
| Gabriel Agbonlahor | FW | 2005 | 2 | 0 | England | — |
| Lionel Ainsworth | FW | 2008–2009 | 20 | 0 | England | (Note: Represented England at youth level.) |
| Vic Akers | DF | 1975 | 26 | 0 | None | — |
| Edward Allan | DF | 1902–1903 | 21 | 0 | None | — |
| Walter Allan | FW | 1900–1901 | 19 | 1 | None | — |
| Doug Allder | MF | 1977 | 1 | 0 | England | |
| Derrick Allen | FW | 1956 | 8 | 1 | None | — |
| Wayne Allison | FW | 1989–1990 | 7 | 0 | None | — |
| Julian Alsford | DF | 1992–1993 | 16 | 1 | None | — |
| Keith Andrews | MF | 2014–2015 | 11 | 1 | Republic of Ireland | — |
| Wayne Andrews | FW | 1996–1999 | 37 | 6 | None | — |
| Harry Anstiss | MF | 1923–1924 | 22 | 5 | None | — |
| Arthur Ardley | DF | 1898 | 15 | 0 | None | — |
| Craig Armstrong | MF | 1997 | 15 | 0 | None | — |
| Stephen Armstrong | FW | 2000–2001 | 4 | 0 | None | — |
| Wally Armstrong | FW | 1927 | 1 | 0 | None | — |
| Thomas Ashbridge | FW | 1913–1914 | 23 | 14 | None | — |
| Moses Ashikodi | FW | 2007–2009 | 4 | 0 | Antigua and Barbuda; England under-19 | |
| William Ashmole | MF | 1919 | 1 | 0 | None | — |
| Britt Assombalonga | FW | 2012 | 4 | 0 | None | — |
| Bryan Atkinson | DF | 1955–1956 | 21 | 0 | None | — |
| Paul Atkinson | MF | 1983–1984 | 13 | 0 | None | — |
| Cédric Avinel | DF | 2007–2009 | 3 | 0 | Guadeloupe | — |
| Espen Baardsen | GK | 2000–2002 | 46 | 0 | Norway | — |
| Ernest Bacon | DF | 1920–1921 | 12 | 0 | England | (Note: Represented England at schoolboy level.) |
| James Bagshaw | DF | 1921 | 14 | 0 | England | — |
| Dennis Bailey | FW | 1994 | 8 | 4 | None | — |
| Chris Baird | DF | 2003–2004 | 18 | 0 | Northern Ireland | — |
| Adrian Bakalli | MF | 1999 | 2 | 0 | Belgium | (Note: Represented Belgium at under-21 level) |
| Guthrie Baker | GK | 1898–1900 | 46 | 0 | None | (Note: Player made additional appearances for West Hertfordshire prior to the start of the 1898–99 season.) |
| Jimmy Baker | DF/FW | 1925–1926 | 9 | 2 | None | — |
| Dave Bamber | FW | 1988 | 22 | 4 | Great Britain | (Note: Represented Great Britain at the World Student Games.) |
| Herbert Banks | FW | 1903–1904 | 21 | 22 | England | — |
| Bill Barber | MF | 1957–1960 | 26 | 0 | None | — |
| Cecil Barnard | FW | 1921 | 2 | 1 | None | — |
| C. Barnes | MF | 1904–1906 | 6 | 2 | None | — |
| David Barnes | DF | 1994–1996 | 17 | 0 | England | |
| Edward Barnes | GK | 1920 | 1 | 0 | None | — |
| George Barnes | MF | 1919–1924 | 5 | 1 | None | — |
| Peter Barnes | DF | 1960–1962 | 10 | 0 | None | — |
| Ernest Barsby | DF | 1909–1910 | 4 | 0 | None | — |
| Frank Barson | DF | 1928 | 10 | 1 | England | — |
| Harry Barton | FW | 1903–1905 | 39 | 26 | None | — |
| Sébastien Bassong | DF | 2014–2015 | 11 | 0 | Cameroon | – |
| Ernie Bateman | DF | 1955–1956 | 24 | 0 | None | — |
| Billy Bates | MF | 1942–1949 | 13 | 1 | None | — |
| Bill Baxter | DF | 1971–1972 | 12 | 0 | None | — |
| Tom Bayley | DF | 1900 | 4 | 0 | None | — |
| Tuggy Beach | DF/FW | 1898–1902 | 49 | 18 | None | — |
| Peter Beadle | FW | 1994–1995 | 24 | 1 | None | — |
| Roger Beament | GK | 1957 | 1 | 0 | None | — |
| Craig Beattie | FW | 2011–2012 | 4 | 1 | Scotland | — |
| Sydney Beaumont | MF | 1909–1911 | 27 | 1 | None | — |
| Billy Beckett | FW | 1945–1947 | 15 | 2 | None | — |
| Martin Beckton | MF | 1909–1910 | 21 | 2 | None | — |
| Valon Behrami | MF | 2015–2017 | 49 | 0 | Switzerland | – |
| Steve Leo Beleck | FW | 2012–2013 | 6 | 0 | Cameroon under-17 | — |
| Essaïd Belkalem | DF | 2013–2014 | 10 | 0 | Algeria | — |
| John Bell | FW | 1924–1926 | 21 | 6 | None | — |
| Bert Bellamy | DF | 1921–1923 | 37 | 2 | None | — |
| Héctor Bellerín | DF | 2013–2014 | 8 | 0 | Spain under-19 | — |
| Trevor Benjamin | FW | 2005 | 2 | 0 | Jamaica | — |
| Dale Bennett | DF | 2009–2013 | 25 | 0 | None | — |
| Steven Berghuis | FW | 2015–2016 | 11 | 0 | Netherlands | – |
| Charlie Billington | DF | 1957 | 17 | 0 | None | — |
| Charlie Birse | DF | 1946–1947 | 9 | 0 | Scotland | (Note: Represented Scotland at junior level) |
| Bill Black | FW | 1937–1938 | 16 | 3 | None | — |
| Albert Blake | MF | 1929–1933 | 29 | 0 | None | — |
| Pat Bland | GK | 1946 | 1 | 0 | None | — |
| Dominic Blizzard | MF | 2004–2007 | 36 | 3 | None | — |
| Micky Block | MF | 1966–1967 | 13 | 2 | England | |
| Patrick Blondeau | DF | 2001–2002 | 27 | 1 | France | — |
| Jack Blythe | DF | 1911–1913 | 49 | 0 | None | — |
| Jonathan Bond | GK | 2012–2015; 2024–2025 | 46 | 0 | Wales; England under-21 | — |
| Jack Bonham | GK | 2013 | 1 | 0 | Republic of Ireland under-17 | — |
| Alexandre Bonnot | MF | 1999–2001 | 16 | 0 | None | — |
| Stuart Brace | MF | 1965–1966 | 18 | 6 | None | — |
| Jack Bradshaw | MF | 1919 | 1 | 0 | None | — |
| Ben Brelsford | DF | 1928–1930 | 25 | 1 | None | — |
| Liam Bridcutt | DF | 2008–2009 | 9 | 0 | England | |
| Matthew Briggs | DF | 2013 | 9 | 1 | England under-21 | — |
| Guy Bristow | DF | 1974–1976 | 23 | 0 | None | — |
| Jimmy Broad | FW | 1926 | 2 | 1 | None | — |
| Leigh Bromby | DF | 2008–2009 | 46 | 1 | None | — |
| Steve Brooker | FW | 1999 | 2 | 0 | None | — |
| Kurtney Brooks | FW | 2009–2010 | 1 | 0 | Wales | (Note: Represented Wales at youth level) |
| Matt Broughton | MF | 1904–1907 | 14 | 0 | None | — |
| George Brown | FW | 1905–1906 | 3 | 0 | None | — |
| Joe Brown | FW | 1937–1939 | 6 | 2 | None | — |
| Bobby Brown | FW | 1961–1963 | 30 | 11 | England | (Note: Represented England at amateur level) (Note: Represented Great Britain at the Olympic Games) |
| Reece Brown | DF | 2013 | 3 | 0 | England under-20 | — |
| Wayne Brown | DF | 2002–2004 | 37 | 4 | None | — |
| Billy Brunt | GK | 1898–1900 | 6 | 0 | None | — |
| Michael Bryan | MF | 2009–2012 | 14 | 0 | Northern Ireland | — |
| Prince Buaben | MF | 2011–2013 | 33 | 1 | Ghana | — |
| Will Buckley | MF | 2010–2011 | 43 | 5 | None | — |
| Eric Burgess | DF | 1964 | 3 | 0 | None | — |
| George Byers | MF | 2015 | 1 | 0 | Scotland under-17 | – |
| David Byrne | MF | 1990–1991 | 18 | 2 | None | — |
| Joe Calvert | GK | 1948 | 5 | 0 | None | — |
| Tommy Carpenter | GK | 1950–1951 | 4 | 0 | None | — |
| Dave Carr | FW | 1965 | 10 | 3 | None | — |
| Jimmy Carr | MF | 1913–1914 | 18 | 0 | None | — |
| Jock Carter | FW | 1933–1934 | 17 | 8 | None | — |
| Norman Case | FW | 1950–1951 | 10 | 4 | None | — |
| Darren Caskey | MF | 1995 | 6 | 1 | England | |
| Keith Cassells | FW | 1978–1980 | 17 | 0 | None | — |
| Francis Cassidy | MF | 1983 | 1 | 0 | None | — |
| Aleksandrs Cauņa | MF | 2009 | 5 | 1 | Latvia | — |
| Johan Cavalli | MF | 2007–2008 | 3 | 0 | None | — |
| Jimmy Chalmers | MF | 1901–1902 | 32 | 6 | None | — |
| Charlie Chase | FW | 1946–1948 | 16 | 1 | None | — |
| Park Chu-young | FW | 2014 | 2 | 0 | South Korea | — |
| Denis Cheney | MF | 1948 | 18 | 5 | None | — |
| Steve Cherry | GK | 1995 | 4 | 0 | England | |
| Gary Chivers | DF/MF | 1987–1988 | 19 | 0 | None | — |
| Chris Clarke | MF | 1966 | 2 | 0 | None | — |
| Tracey Clarke | FW | 1898 | 13 | 4 | None | — |
| Fred Cleaver | FW/DF | 1908–1910 | 41 | 9 | None | — |
| Archie Clement | DF | 1930–1931 | 14 | 0 | None | — |
| Ephraim Colclough | FW | 1900–1901 | 17 | 1 | None | — |
| Theo Coles | DF | 1921 | 1 | 0 | None | — |
| Ernie Colledge | MF | 1924 | 1 | 0 | None | — |
| Mike Collins | GK | 1958–1959 | 46 | 0 | None | — |
| David Connolly | FW | 1995–1997 | 34 | 15 | Republic of Ireland | — |
| Matthew Connolly | DF | 2015 | 6 | 0 | England under-19 | – |
| Billy Cooke | DF | 1954 | 10 | 0 | None | — |
| Jack Cork | MF | 2009 | 21 | 1 | England; Great Britain | — |
| Eddie Cother | FW | 1898–1899 | 9 | 1 | None | — |
| Frank Cotterill | FW | 1909–1910 | 15 | 6 | None | — |
| Ernest Cottrell | FW | 1901–1903 | 39 | 12 | None | — |
| Albert Cousins | MF | 1911 | 2 | 0 | None | — |
| Wilfred Coutanche | DF | 1921–1923 | 6 | 0 | None | — |
| Bob Cowan | FW/DF | 1928–1929 | 6 | 1 | None | — |
| John Cowen | GK | 1965–1967 | 17 | 0 | England | (Note: Represented England at under-21 level) |
| A.G. Cox | DF | 1899 | 1 | 0 | None | — |
| Peter Croker | DF/GK | 1952–1953 | 26 | 0 | None | — |
| Bert Crownshaw | MF | 1913 | 1 | 0 | None | (Note: Crownshaw was contracted to Watford between 1909 and 1916. He played regularly for the reserves, and for the first team during wartime competitions. He made his sole competitive first team appearance in 1913.) |
| Jimmy Crussell | FW | 1925 | 1 | 0 | England | |
| Pat Curran | IF | 1939–1946 | 4 | 0 | None | — |
| Tony Currie | MF | 1967–1968 | 21 | 9 | England | — |
| George Cutts | GK | 1921–1923 | 6 | 0 | None | — |
| Ben Dabbs | DF | 1938–1940 | 3 | 0 | None | — |
| William Dackers | FB | 1902–1903 | 28 | 1 | None | — |
| Malcolm Dalrymple | GK | 1974 | 5 | 0 | England | |
| Ron Daly | IF | 1950 | 4 | 0 | None | — |
| Alfred Darvill | CF | 1925 | 1 | 0 | None | — |
| Calum Davenport | DF | 2008 | 1 | 0 | England under-21 | — |
| George Davenport | FB/HB | 1898–1899 | 48 | 1 | None | — |
| Graham Davies | GK | 1947–1948 | 9 | 0 | Wales | (Note: Represented Wales at schoolboy level.) |
| Robert Davies | HB | 1910–1911 | 17 | 0 | Wales | (Note: Represented Wales at amateur level.) |
| J. Davis | FB | 1903 | 1 | 0 | None | — |
| Albert Day | CF | 1949 | 4 | 1 | None | — |
| Jimmy Day | IF | 1952 | 3 | 0 | None | — |
| Roger Day | IF | 1962 | 1 | 0 | England | |
| Eddie Denton | MF | 1991 | 2 | 0 | None | — |
| Willie Devine | OF | 1958–1959 | 30 | 6 | None | — |
| Alan Devonshire | MF | 1990–1991 | 27 | 1 | England | — |
| Len Dewick | GK | 1924 | 7 | 0 | None | — |
| Samba Diakité | MF | 2014 | 6 | 0 | Mali | — |
| Alessandro Diamanti | MF | 2015–2016 | 3 | 0 | None | — |
| Carl Dickinson | DF | 2011–2012 | 47 | 2 | None | — |
| Perry Digweed | GK | 1993–1995 | 31 | 0 | None | — |
| Kerry Dixon | FW | 1996 | 11 | 0 | England | — |
| Josh Doherty | MF | 2014–2016 | 1 | 0 | Northern Ireland under-19 | — |
| David Donald | OF | 1913–1914 | 24 | 3 | None | — |
| Gary Donnellan | MF | 1981 | 1 | 0 | None | — |
| C.F. Drake | OF | 1902 | 1 | 0 | None | — |
| Charlie Drinkwater | OF | 1941–1947 | 10 | 0 | None | — |
| Danny Drinkwater | MF | 2011 | 12 | 0 | England | |
| George Drury | FW | 1948–1949 | 36 | 3 | None | — |
| Billy Dryden | IF | 1913–1914 | 20 | 8 | None | — |
| Reg Dudley | FB | 1950 | 1 | 0 | England | |
| Lloyd Dyer | MF | 2014–2016 | 16 | 3 | None | — |
| Barry Dyson | CF | 1968 | 40 | 19 | None | — |
| Terry Eades | DF | 1976 | 4 | 0 | None | — |
| Mike Early | MF | 1946 | 5 | 1 | None | — |
| Ray Eastway | HB | 1951–1952 | 14 | 0 | None | — |
| Sam Eaton | IF | 1905–1906 | 12 | 2 | None | — |
| Derek Edmonds | GK | 1971 | 15 | 0 | England | |
| Harry Edwards | HB/IF | 1899 | 7 | 0 | None | — |
| Jack Elkes | IF | 1933 | 9 | 1 | England | (Note: Played for England in "unofficial" international matches.) |
| Fred Ellis | HB | 1931–1932 | 37 | 1 | None | — |
| Sam Ellis | DF | 1977–1978 | 40 | 5 | England | (Note: Represented England at under-23 level.) |
| Jack English | DF | 1912–1913 | 36 | 0 | None | — |
| George Ephgrave | GK | 1951 | 4 | 0 | None | — |
| Roy Evans | CF | 1951 | 2 | 1 | None | — |
| Hugh Evans | CF | 1952–1953 | 7 | 2 | None | — |
| Jethro Evans | CF | 1912–1913 | 14 | 1 | None | — |
| Charlie Ewington | DF | 1934–1936 | 12 | 0 | None | — |
| Diego Fabbrini | FW | 2013–2016 | 29 | 1 | Italy | — |
| John Fairbrother | CF | 1959–1963 | 45 | 22 | None | — |
| Mark Falco | FW | 1986–1987 | 41 | 16 | England | |
| Jean-Alain Fanchone | DF | 2012 | 1 | 0 | France under-19 | — |
| Marco Davide Faraoni | DF | 2013–2014 | 45 | 4 | Italy under 21 | — |
| Thomas Farnall | HB | 1900, 1902 | 34 | 2 | None | — |
| Albert Farrow | HB/OF | 1908–1909 | 9 | 0 | None | — |
| W. Fellows | HB | 1899–1901 | 19 | 0 | None | — |
| John Ferguson | OF | 1929–1930 | 4 | 0 | None | — |
| George Ferne | OF | 1900 | 4 | 1 | None | — |
| Peter Fisher | IF | 1936 | 3 | 1 | None | — |
| Gary Fitzgerald | DF | 1994 | 1 | 0 | None | — |
| George Fleming | FW | 1958–1959 | 31 | 10 | None | — |
| Eli Fletcher | DF | 1926–1927 | 25 | 1 | None | — |
| Leonard Fletcher | FW | 1935–1938 | 42 | 25 | None | — |
| William Flint | FW | 1910–1911 | 20 | 7 | None | — |
| Craig Forsyth | DF/MF | 2011–2013 | 26 | 5 | England Scotland | — |
| Arthur Foxall | DF | 1923–1924 | 3 | 1 | None | — |
| Fred Foxall | OF | 1923–1924 | 35 | 2 | None | — |
| Albert Francis | OF | 1924 | 1 | 0 | None | — |
| John Frankish | DF | 1913 | 2 | 0 | None | — |
| Paul Franklin | DF | 1981–1986 | 43 | 0 | None | — |
| John Fraser | FW | 1962–1964 | 29 | 4 | None | — |
| Graham French | GK | 1964 | 4 | 0 | England | |
| John Furie | DF | 1967 | 1 | 0 | None | — |
| George Furr | FW | 1906–1909 | 41 | 3 | None | — |
| Vic Furr | MF | 1925 | 1 | 0 | None | — |
| Bert Gale | HB | 1901, 1909–1910 | 5 | 0 | None | — |
| Charlie Gallogly | FB | 1952–1954 | 47 | 0 | Ireland | — |
| Ray Garbutt | CF | 1950–1951 | 23 | 8 | None | — |
| Joe Garner | MF | 2011–2012 | 27 | 1 | England under-19 | — |
| Johnny Gavin | OF | 1958–1959 | 46 | 13 | Republic of Ireland | — |
| Mark Gavin | MF | 1990–1991 | 13 | 0 | None | — |
| Jimmy Gay | MF | 1930 | 5 | 0 | None | — |
| George Gemmell | CF | 1911–1912, 1914–1915 | 6 | 1 | None | — |
| Frank George | GK | 1964–1965 | 10 | 0 | None | — |
| Ricky George | OF | 1964–1965 | 5 | 0 | None | — |
| Alex Geijo | FW | 2012–2013 | 20 | 2 | None | — |
| Peter Gibbs | GK | 1975–1976 | 4 | 0 | None | — |
| Billy Gibson | MF | 2008–2010 | 1 | 0 | None | — |
| Frank Gibson | OF | 1946 | 1 | 0 | None | — |
| Patrick Gillespie | FB | 1945–1947 | 16 | 0 | None | — |
| Jimmy Gilligan | FW | 1981–1985 | 41 | 13 | None | — |
| Rene Gilmartin | GK | 2010–2012 | 7 | 0 | Republic of Ireland | (Note: Represented Republic of Ireland at under-21 level.) |
| Charlie Gladwin | FB | 1919–1920 | 12 | 0 | None | — |
| Jimmy Gooch | HB | 1956–1957 | 44 | 0 | None | — |
| Micky Good | HB | 1899–1901 | 29 | 7 | None | — |
| Ted Goodier | FB | 1935 | 1 | 0 | None | — |
| Peter Gordon | IF | 1958–1960 | 46 | 13 | None | — |
| Peter Goy | GK | 1964–1965 | 30 | 0 | None | — |
| Micky Gray | IF | 1947 | 10 | 3 | None | — |
| Ron Gray | HB | 1942–1943, 1945–1947 | 29 | 4 | None | (Note: Ron Gray managed the club from 1950 until 1951.) |
| Rodney Green | FW | 1968–1970 | 33 | 8 | None | — |
| Brian Greenhalgh | FW | 1975 | 21 | 2 | None | — |
| Robert Greenslade | HB | 1901–1903 | 31 | 0 | None | — |
| Tom Grieve | OF | 1904 | 1 | 0 | None | — |
| William Grimes | FW | 1906–1907 | 16 | 4 | None | — |
| Arthur Grimsdell | HB | 1911–1912 | 41 | 4 | England | — |
| Ernie Grimsdell | FB | 1913–1920 | 15 | 0 | England | |
| Joe Groome | CF | 1927–1928 | 17 | 14 | None | — |
| Gordon Haigh | IF | 1951–1952 | 31 | 7 | None | — |
| Fitz Hall | DF | 2012–2014 | 28 | 1 | None | — |
| Andrew Hamilton | OF | 1900–1901 | 6 | 1 | None | — |
| Jock Hamilton | HB | 1901–1902 | 32 | 3 | None | — |
| John Hamilton | IF | 1967 | 11 | 2 | England | (Note: Played for Scotland at under-23 level.) |
| Jack Hamilton | IF | 1921 | 2 | 0 | None | — |
| Richard Hammett | GK | 1900–1901 | 36 | 0 | None | — |
| Tony Hapgood | OF | 1953 | 1 | 0 | None | — |
| A. Harding | FB/CF | 1901–1903 | 15 | 0 | None | — |
| Paul Harding | MF | 1993 | 2 | 0 | None | — |
| Ivor Harper | IF | 1952 | 3 | 0 | None | — |
| John Harris | FW | 1925–1926 | 32 | 5 | None | — |
| Gerald Harrison | MF | 1990 | 10 | 0 | None | — |
| Barry Hartle | IF | 1958–1960 | 45 | 8 | None | — |
| Tom Hartley | IF | 1948 | 6 | 1 | None | — |
| Howard Harvey | CF/IF | 1901–1903 | 42 | 4 | None | — |
| William Hastings | OF | 1914–1917 | 35 | 6 | None | — |
| Harry Hawkins | IF/HB | 1937–1938 | 5 | 0 | None | — |
| Norrie Haywood | CF | 1933 | 1 | 0 | None | — |
| David Heard | OF | 1960 | 1 | 0 | England | |
| Liam Henderson | FW | 2008–2011 | 21 | 0 | None | — |
| Billy Hendry | HB | 1898 | 5 | 0 | None | — |
| Liburd Henry | FW | 1989–1990 | 15 | 1 | None | — |
| Jimmy Hernon | IF | 1954–1956 | 45 | 11 | None | — |
| Arthur Hetherington | OF | 1938 | 8 | 1 | None | — |
| Peter Hetherston | MF | 1987–1988 | 9 | 2 | None | — |
| Bill Hicklin | HB | 1947–1948 | 23 | 5 | None | — |
| Bert Higgins | GK | 1902–1908, 1910 | 47 | 0 | None | — |
| Sid High | OF | 1948–1949 | 7 | 3 | None | — |
| Danny Hill | MF | 1996 | 1 | 0 | England | |
| Richard Hill | MF | 1987 | 4 | 0 | None | — |
| Ralph Hills | OF | 1927–1929 | 31 | 3 | None | — |
| Jimmy Hindmarsh | CF | 1907–1908 | 10 | 4 | None | — |
| Steve Hodge | MF | 1995 | 2 | 0 | England | — |
| Cornelius Hogan | HB | 1901 | 2 | 0 | None | — |
| Dean Holdsworth | FW | 1987–1989 | 20 | 3 | England | (Note: Played for the England B national football team) |
| Peter Holland | IF | 1928–1930 | 22 | 3 | England | |
| Stan Hopkinson | GK | 1947 | 1 | 0 | None | — |
| Oscar Horne | OF | 1909 | 5 | 0 | None | — |
| Fred Horner | GK | 1902 | 29 | 0 | None | — |
| George Howard | FB | 1906 | 1 | 0 | None | — |
| Ted Hufton | GK | 1932 | 2 | 0 | England | — |
| Roger Hugo | FW | 1965–1966 | 26 | 6 | None | — |
| George Hunt | HB | 1946–1949 | 35 | 0 | None | — |
| Stan Hurst | OF | 1936–1937 | 30 | 12 | None | — |
| Víctor Ibarbo | FW | 2015 | 4 | 0 | None | — |
| Alex Inglethorpe | FW | 1990–1994 | 17 | 3 | None | — |
| Bill Inglis | HB | 1932–1933 | 12 | 0 | None | — |
| Iriney | MF | 2013–2014 | 17 | 0 | None | — |
| Derek Irvin | FW | 1968 | 2 | 1 | None | — |
| Bob Irvine | IF | 1933–1934 | 23 | 2 | Ireland | — |
| Ernie Ison | OF | 1932 | 3 | 1 | None | — |
| Chris Iwelumo | FW | 2011–2012 | 47 | 5 | England Scotland | — |
| Frank Jackett | IF / HB | 1949–1953 | 14 | 0 | None | — |
| Billy Jackson | OF | 1935 | 4 | 1 | None | — |
| Alex Jakubiak | FW | 2014 | 1 | 0 | Scotland under-19 | — |
| Tom James | DF | 2012 | 1 | 0 | None | — |
| William Janes | OF | 1899 | 2 | 1 | None | — |
| Alfred Jebb | HB / OF | 1912–1913 | 41 | 0 | None | — |
| Alec Jeffrey | HB | 1900–1901 | 21 | 0 | None | — |
| Nigel Jemson | FW | 1995 | 4 | 0 | England | |
| George Jewett | FB | 1927–1928 | 29 | 0 | None | — |
| Bedford Jezzard | CF | 1945 | 3 | 1 | England | — |
| Richard Jobson | DF | 1982–1984 | 38 | 4 | England | |
| David Johnson | FW | 1981–1983 | 14 | 0 | None | — |
| George Johnson | IF | 1937–1938 | 25 | 9 | None | — |
| George Johnson | HB | 1938 | 1 | 0 | None | — |
| Mo Johnston | FW | 1983–1984 | 46 | 27 | Scotland | — |
| Bryn Jones | FB | 1963 | 2 | 0 | Wales | |
| David Jones | IF | 1938 | 2 | 0 | None | — |
| Jimmy Jones | HB | 1904–1905 | 7 | 0 | None | — |
| Ormond Jones | GK | 1936 | 8 | 0 | Wales | |
| Trevor Jones | OF | 1949–1950 | 16 | 3 | None | — |
| Morris Jones | IF | 1951–1952 | 28 | 7 | None | — |
| Harry Jordan | HB | 1898–1899 | 1 | 0 | None | — |
| Jose Manuel Jurado | MF | 2015-2016 | 30 | 0 | None | – |
| Alex Kačaniklić | MF | 2012 | 12 | 1 | Sweden | — |
| William Kelly | OF | 1910–1911 | 31 | 8 | None | — |
| Andy Kennedy | FW | 1990–1991 | 29 | 5 | England | (Note: Represented Scotland at youth level.) |
| Mike Kenning | MF | 1972–1973 | 44 | 3 | None | — |
| Rob Kiernan | DF/MF | 2009–2011 | 2 | 0 | Republic of Ireland | (Note: Represented Republic of Ireland at youth level.) |
| Michael Kightly | MF | 2011–2012 | 12 | 3 | England | |
| E. Kilner | OF | 1912–1913 | 5 | 0 | None | — |
| Tommy King | GK | 1955–1956 | 21 | 0 | None | — |
| Badger Kirby | OF | 1922 | 1 | 0 | None | — |
| Jim Kirkpatrick | FB | 1927 | 9 | 0 | None | — |
| Martin Kuhl | MF | 1988 | 4 | 0 | None | — |
| Tomasz Kuszczak | GK | 2012 | 13 | 0 | Poland | — |
| Peter Kyle | CF | 1909–1910 | 13 | 4 | None | — |
| Dick Lacey | FW | 1923 | 3 | 1 | None | — |
| David Laing | OF | 1937–1938 | 17 | 5 | None | — |
| Henri Lansbury | MF | 2009–2010 | 39 | 5 | England | |
| Norman Lawson | FB | 1960 | 1 | 0 | None | — |
| Jimmy Lawton | CF | 1967–1968 | 16 | 3 | None | — |
| Miguel Layún | FB | 2014–2015 | 21 | 1 | Mexico | — |
| Jimmy Leaver | HB | 1926–1927 | 35 | 3 | None | — |
| Jack Lee | OF | 1924–1925 | 8 | 0 | None | — |
| Don Lees | FW | 1904–1905 | 7 | 2 | None | — |
| Fred Le May | OF | 1932 | 4 | 0 | None | — |
| Ken Lesslie | OF | 1948 | 8 | 2 | None | — |
| Thomas Lewis | OF | 1920 | 1 | 0 | None | — |
| Thomas Lindsay | OF | 1930 | 9 | 1 | None | — |
| Spencer Lister | OF | 1898–1899 | 12 | 3 | None | — |
| Frank Lock | FB | 1955–1957 | 44 | 1 | England | (Note: Represented England in an "unofficial" senior match.) |
| Clive Lomas | CB | 1966 | 7 | 0 | None | — |
| Roy Low | FW | 1967–1968 | 26 | 4 | England | |
| Dominic Ludden | DF | 1994–1997 | 39 | 0 | None | — |
| George Lunn | HB | 1941–1947 | 7 | 0 | None | — |
| Thomas Lynch | GK | 1937 | 2 | 0 | None | — |
| Frank Lyon | FB | 1902–1903 | 14 | 0 | None | — |
| Herbert Lyon | IF/CF | 1901–1902 | 32 | 14 | None | — |
| Patrick McArdle | OF | 1910–1911 | 12 | 0 | None | — |
| Frank McAvoy | HB | 1902–1903 | 24 | 2 | None | — |
| Alan McCarthy | DF | 1993–1994 | 9 | 0 | England; Wales | (Note: McCarthy played for England at youth level, but Wales at under-21 level.) |
| Kevin McCarthy | MF | 1975–1977 | 38 | 1 | None | — |
| Albert McClenaghan | DF | 1978 | 2 | 0 | None | — |
| Jimmy McCrae | HB | 1926 | 2 | 0 | None | — |
| Tom McCready | FB | 1963 | 3 | 0 | England | (Note: Represented Scotland at schoolboy level.) |
| Dennis McCrystal | GK | 1950 | 1 | 0 | None | — |
| Robert McCulloch | MF | 1925 | 14 | 2 | None | — |
| Josh McEachran | OF | 2013 | 8 | 0 | England under-21 | — |
| Stephen McGinn | MF | 2010–2011 | 42 | 2 | Scotland | (Note: Represented Scotland at under-21 level.) |
| Mick McGovern | FW | 1972 | 5 | 0 | None | — |
| Robert McGuire | OF | 1914–15 | 3 | 0 | None | — |
| Lewis McGugan | MF | 2013–2014 | 44 | 11 | England under-19 | — |
| Jock McHugh | GK | 1933–1941 | 40 | 0 | None | — |
| David McKinley | FW | 1908–1909 | 26 | 6 | None | — |
| Joe McLauchlan | CF | 1913–1916 | 21 | 8 | None | — |
| Tommy McMillan | IF/OF | 1956–1958 | 33 | 13 | None | — |
| F.A. McMorran | HB | 1914–1914 | 7 | 0 | None | — |
| Robert McWilliams | OF | 1930–1931 | 22 | 1 | None | — |
| Laurence Mahon | HB | 1913 | 11 | 0 | None | — |
| Sam Malpass | FB | 1943–1949 | 41 | 0 | None | — |
| Reuben Marden | OF/CF | 1955–1956 | 41 | 11 | None | — |
| Leo Markham | FW | 1972–1975 | 35 | 3 | None | — |
| William Markland | FB | 1919–1920 | 13 | 0 | None | — |
| William Marshall | HB | 1922 | 2 | 0 | None | — |
| Dennis Maskell | OF | 1951–1952 | 5 | 0 | None | — |
| Gavin Massey | FW | 2010–2012 | 9 | 0 | None | — |
| Harry Matthew | HB | 1903 | 10 | 0 | None | — |
| Jimmy Maxwell | OF | 1926 | 4 | 1 | England | |
| James Meara | MF | 1993 | 2 | 0 | None | — |
| Gordon Mee | GK | 1945–1946 | 8 | 0 | None | — |
| Colin Meldrum | FB | 1960–1962 | 40 | 0 | None | — |
| Terry Melling | FW | 1966–1967 | 30 | 7 | None | — |
| Tony Meola | GK | 1990 | 1 | 0 | United States | — |
| Bernard Mensah | FW | 2013–2015 | 2 | 0 | None | — |
| Alexander Merkel | MF | 2014 | 11 | 1 | Germany under-20 | — |
| Harry Middleton | FW | 1911–1912 | 23 | 5 | None | — |
| Dossie Miles | HB | 1929–1930 | 17 | 1 | None | — |
| Ted Miller | OF | 1922 | 2 | 0 | England | |
| Paul Miller | DF | 1988–1989 | 30 | 1 | None | — |
| Peter Miller | IF | 1930–1931 | 16 | 2 | None | — |
| Rev Miller | OF | 1922 | 1 | 0 | None | — |
| Harry Mingay | GK | 1927 | 3 | 0 | None | — |
| Piero Mingoia | MF | 2010–2011 | 7 | 1 | None | — |
| David Mirfin | DF | 2011–2012 | 5 | 0 | None | — |
| Joe Moffat | HB | 1908–1909 | 18 | 0 | England | |
| Jack Moore | OF | 1909–1910 | 23 | 4 | None | — |
| Ian Morgan | MF | 1973–1974 | 18 | 1 | None | — |
| Taffy Morgan | CF | 1902–1904 | 16 | 9 | Wales | |
| Billy Morgan | HB | 1903–1904 | 22 | 10 | None | — |
| Steve Morrow | DF | 1991 | 9 | 0 | Northern Ireland | — |
| Marco Motta | MF | 2015 | 9 | 0 | Italy under-21 | – |
| Alf Moule | CF | 1928–1929 | 11 | 4 | None | — |
| Geoffrey Mujangi Bia | MF | 2012–2013 | 5 | 0 | Belgium | — |
| Gianni Munari | MF | 2014–2015 | 31 | 3 | None | — |
| Stuart Munn | HB | 1901–1904 | 39 | 0 | None | — |
| Jimmy Murray | IF | 1902–1903 | 29 | 6 | England | |
| Jordon Mutch | MF | 2010–2011 | 23 | 5 | England | |
| Lucas Neill | DF | 2014 | 1 | 0 | Australia | — |
| Warren Neill | DF | 1996 | 1 | 0 | | — |
| James Ness | CF | 1911 | 5 | 2 | | — |
| Neuton | DF | 2012–2013 | 9 | 0 | None | — |
| Robert Newman | IF | 1922 | 1 | 0 | | — |
| Tommy Niblo | FW | 1906–1907 | 42 | 11 | | — |
| Peter Nicholas | MF | 1991–1992 | 46 | 1 | | — |
| George Norman | CF | 1912 | 8 | 4 | | — |
| Luke O'Nien | MF | 2014 | 1 | 0 | | — |
| Joe North | CF/IF | 1926–1927 | 6 | 0 | | — |
| Ralph Oelofse | HB/FB | 1953–1954 | 15 | 0 | | — |
| Paul Okon | DF | 2002 | 15 | 0 | Australia | — |
| Joseph Orme | GK | 1911–1913 | 14 | 0 | | — |
| Billy Orr | HB/FB | 1906–1907 | 12 | 0 | | — |
| Johnny Osbourne | HB/IF | 1948–1949 | 35 | 13 | | — |
| Eddie Oshodi | DF | 2009–2011 | 2 | 0 | England | |
| Davie Ovenstone | OF | 1937 | 2 | 0 | | — |
| Fred Packham | OF | 1926–1927 | 5 | 0 | | — |
| R. Padley | FW | 1903 | 1 | 0 | | — |
| Charlie Palmer | FB | 1981–84 | 18 | 1 | | — |
| Fred Palmer | HB | 1907–10 | 19 | 2 | | — |
| Thomas Pangborn | IF | 1901–02 | 26 | 5 | | — |
| Harry Pantling | FB/HB | 1911–1914 | 39 | 0 | England | — |
| Jack Papworth | CF | 1925 | 27 | 12 | | — |
| Dick Parker | CF | 1927–1928 | 14 | 3 | | — |
| Jordan Parkes | DF | 2006–2010 | 5 | 0 | England | |
| Bob Parkinson | CF | 1900–1901 | 15 | 5 | | — |
| Martin Patching | MF | 1979–1983 | 36 | 6 | | — |
| Sandy Pate | FB | 1965–1967 | 15 | 0 | | — |
| Tommy Paterson | IF/HB | 1952–1954 | 48 | 7 | | — |
| Jim Paton | FB | 1929–1930 | 5 | 0 | | — |
| John Paull | FB | 1898–1899 | | | | — |
| Derek Payne | MF | 1994–1996 | 42 | 1 | | — |
| John Pearce | DF | 1971 | 1 | 0 | | — |
| Fred Pheby | FW | 1906 | 1 | 0 | | — |
| Harold Phipps | HB | 1952–1953 | 47 | 0 | | — |
| Bill Pick | OF | 1930–1931 | 30 | 5 | | — |
| Les Pilkington | OF | 1950–1951 | 5 | 0 | | — |
| W. Pillon | OF | 1907 | 1 | 0 | | — |
| Geoff Pitcher | MF | 1995–1996 | 17 | 2 | | — |
| Colin Pluck | DF | 1997 | 2 | 0 | | (Note: Now known as Colin Miles.) |
| Gary Plumley | GK | 1987 | 1 | 0 | None | — |
| Richard Poole | FW | 1976–1977 | 9 | 1 | | — |
| William Poole | CF | 1923–1925 | 43 | 9 | | — |
| Mart Poom | GK | 2007–2009 | 19 | 0 | Estonia | — |
| Cliff Powell | DF | 1988 | 1 | 0 | | — |
| Jimmy Poxton | OF | 1934–35 | 26 | 10 | | — |
| Hugh Prentice | CF | 1910 | 1 | 0 | | — |
| John Price | FB | 1955 | 26 | 0 | | — |
| Neil Price | DF | 1982–1984 | 13 | 0 | | — |
| John Proudfoot | CF | 1902 | 13 | 5 | | — |
| Chris Pullan | DF/MF | 1987–1990 | 15 | 0 | | — |
| David Pygall | IF | 1956–1960 | 21 | 2 | | — |
| Micky Quinn | FW | 1995 | 5 | 0 | | — |
| Andrew Ralston | DF | 1905 | 2 | 1 | | — |
| John Rand | IF | 1926–1927 | 6 | 0 | | — |
| Mathias Ranégie | FW | 2014–2017 | 10 | 4 | Sweden | — |
| Bill Ratcliffe | HB | 1948–1949 | 25 | 0 | | — |
| Charlie Rattray | OF | 1934–1935 | 26 | 1 | | — |
| Ernie Reading | FW | 1904–1905 | 6 | 0 | | — |
| Neil Redfearn | MF | 1988–1989 | 36 | 7 | | — |
| Mel Rees | GK | 1987–1988 | 5 | 0 | | — |
| Jimmy Reid | IF | 1905–1906 | 22 | 9 | | — |
| John Reid | OF | 1956 | 1 | 1 | | — |
| Micky Reid | CF | 1952–1956 | 19 | 8 | | — |
| Jack Reynolds | OF | 1907–1908 | 28 | 4 | | — |
| Joe Reynolds | HB | 1930 | 6 | 0 | | — |
| Dave Richards | FB | 1931–1933 | 43 | 0 | | — |
| Ian Richardson | FW | 1983–1985 | 15 | 5 | | — |
| Lee Richardson | MF | 1989–1990 | 44 | 1 | | — |
| Fred Riddell | FW | 1908–1909 | 6 | 0 | | — |
| Albert Riera | DF | 2014 | 8 | 1 | Spain | — |
| Stuart Rimmer | FW | 1988 | 11 | 2 | | — |
| Douglas Rinaldi | MF | 2007–2008 | 7 | 1 | None | — |
| Alex Ritchie | OF | 1933–1934 | 17 | 3 | | — |
| Bob Ritchie | OF | 1949 | 1 | 0 | | — |
| Alan Rivers | DF | 1967 | 2 | 0 | | — |
| Joe Roberts | OF | 1926–1927 | 20 | 5 | | — |
| Tommy Roberts | FB | 1954 | 1 | 0 | | — |
| Len Robertson | IF | 1946 | 6 | 2 | | — |
| Fred Robins | HB | 1898–1899 | 24 | 2 | None | |
| E. Robinson | HB | 1913 | 1 | 0 | | — |
| Reg Robinson | HB | 1937–1938 | 7 | 0 | | — |
| Mark Robson | MF | 1989 | 1 | 0 | | — |
| Mark Rooney | DF | 1997 | 1 | 0 | | — |
| Danny Rose | MF | 2009 | 7 | 0 | England; Great Britain | — |
| Ronny Rosenthal | FW | 1997–1999 | 39 | 11 | Israel | — |
| Bobby Ross | HB | 1946–1947 | 35 | 6 | | — |
| Brian Rowan | DF | 1971–1972 | 13 | 0 | | — |
| Paul Rumble | FB | 1988 | 1 | 0 | | — |
| Dave Russell | GK | 1926 | 7 | 0 | | — |
| George Russell | FB | 1926–1927 | 12 | 1 | | — |
| Jack Rutherford | GK | 1931–1933 | 32 | 0 | | — |
| John Ryden | HB | 1961–1962 | 26 | 1 | | — |
| John Sanchez | HB | 1960–1961 | 26 | 1 | | — |
| Kenny Sansom | DF | 1994 | 1 | 0 | England | — |
| Herbert Saunders | GK | 1909 | 2 | 0 | | — |
| James Saunders | GK | 1910 | 5 | 0 | | — |
| Ron Saunders | FW | 1964–1965 | 41 | 18 | | — |
| Harry Savage | OF | 1921–1922 | 7 | 1 | | — |
| Harry Scott | IF | 1933 | 1 | 0 | | — |
| Frank Searle | HB | 1933 | 5 | 0 | | — |
| Trevor Senior | FW | 1987–1988 | 33 | 5 | | — |
| Mat Sadler | DF | 2008–2011 | 35 | 0 | England | |
| Scott Severin | MF | 2009–2010 | 11 | 1 | Scotland | — |
| Connor Smith | MF/FW | 2012–2015 | 13 | 0 | Republic of Ireland under-19 | — |
| Gabriel Tamaș | DF | 2014–2015 | 9 | 0 | Romania | — |
| Andrew Taylor | DF | 2010–2011 | 19 | 1 | England | |
| Adam Thompson | DF | 2010–2013 | 16 | 1 | Northern Ireland | (Note: Represented Northern Ireland at under-21 level.) |
| George Thorne | MF | 2013 | 8 | 0 | England under-19 | — |
| Andros Townsend | MF | 2011 | 3 | 0 | England | |
| Marcello Trotta | FW | 2012 | 1 | 0 | Italy U21 | — |
| Josh Walker | MF | 2010–2012 | 7 | 0 | England | |
| Andreas Weimann | MF | 2011 | 22 | 4 | Austria | |
| Matthew Whichelow | MF | 2010–2013 | 24 | 3 | None | — |
| Mike Williamson | DF | 2009 | 23 | 3 | None | — |
| Eric Worthington | FW | 1949–1951 | 30 | 4 | None | — |
| Bill Yates | GK | 1926–1929 | 49 | 0 | None | — |
| Lewis Young | FW | 2008–2010 | 4 | 0 | None | — |

== Notes ==
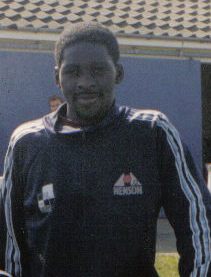
Devon White played 45 games for Watford between 1996 and 1997.
