= Furr (disambiguation) =

Furr is a 2008 album by Blitzen Trapper.

Furr may also refer to:

== People ==
- Christian Furr (born 1966), English painter
- David Furr, American theatre and television actor
- George Furr (1885–1967), English footballer
- Grover Furr (born 1944), American professor and author
- Harry Furr (1887–1971), English footballer
- Joel Furr (b. 1967), American writer and software trainer
- Nyman Furr (1949–2007), American musician
- Roy Furr (1904–1975), founder of Furr's Cafeterias and supermarkets
- Vic Furr (1897–1976), English footballer
- Willie Furr (1891–1975), English footballer
- Paula White (née Furr, born 1966), American preacher
- Lucy Furr, ring name of Daffney (Shannon Claire Spruill, born 1975), American wrestler

== Other uses ==
- Furr's, a chain of restaurants in the United States
- Furr High School, in Houston, Texas, U.S.
- Felina Furr, a fictional character in comic Captain Carrot and His Amazing Zoo Crew!
- "Furr", a song by Pink Guy from the 2017 album Pink Season

== See also ==
- Fur (disambiguation)
- Furry (disambiguation)
