= Fur (disambiguation) =

Fur is a thick growth of hair that covers the skin of many animals.

Fur may also refer to:

== Arts and entertainment ==
- Fur (Archie Bronson Outfit album), 2004
- Fur, an English rock band
- Fur (Jane Wiedlin album), 1988
- Fur (film), 2006
- "Fur", a 2010 episode of Haven (season 1)
- The Fur, a 2004 novel by Nathan Hobby

== People and language ==
- Fur (surname)
- Für, a Hungarian surname
- Fur people, an ethnic group of Sudan
- Fur languages
  - Fur language
- Friulian language, (ISO 639-2 and ISO 639-3 code fur)

== Places ==
- Fur (island), in Denmark
  - Fur Formation, a geologic feature
- Fur, Sweden

== Other uses ==
- Fur clothing
- Ferric uptake regulator family, in molecular biology
- Furin, a protein
- Heraldic fur, a type of heraldry pattern
- Fur, a genus of flies in the family Empididae, synonym of Dolichocephala
- Fur, a genus of fishes in the family Triakidae, synonym of Furgaleus

== See also ==
- Fake fur (disambiguation)
- Furr (disambiguation)
- Furs (disambiguation)
- Furry (disambiguation)
- Fir, a genus of trees
- Furring, thin strips of wood in construction
