= Bagshaw (surname) =

Bagshaw or Bagshawe is an English surname. Notable people with the surname include:

- Amy Bagshaw (b. 1988), international gymnast
- Barbara Bagshaw, American politician
- Christopher Bagshaw (1552–1625?), English academic and Roman Catholic priest
- Edward Bagshaw (disambiguation), several people
- Elizabeth Bagshaw (1881–1982), Canadian doctor and medical director of the first birth control clinic in Canada
- Enoch Bagshaw (1884–1930), American football player and coach
- Frederick Bagshaw (1878–1966), English-Canadian lawyer
- Geoffrey Bagshaw, Australian anthropologist who worked with Yolngu people on the 2003 heritage listing of Yalangbara, Northern Territory
- Harry Bagshaw (1859–1927), English cricketer
- Henry Bagshaw (divine) (1632–1709), English divine
- James Bagshaw (1874–1941), English footballer
- James Bagshaw (1885–1966), English footballer
- Jeremy Bagshaw (b. 1992), Canadian swimmer
- John Bagshaw (1784–1861), British politician
- John Stokes Bagshaw (1808–1888), manufacturer of agricultural machinery in South Australia
- Kerry Bagshaw (1943–2015), British spy
- Margarete Bagshaw (1964–2015), American painter and potter
- Paul Bagshaw (b. 1946), Australian rules footballer
- Robert John Bagshaw (1803–1873), British politician
- Sally Bagshaw (born 1951), American politician
- Samuel Bagshawe (1713–1762), British politician
- Sue Bagshaw (born 1949), New Zealand doctor specialising in the health needs of young people
- William Bagshaw (1628–1702), English presbyterian and nonconformist minister, known as the "Apostle of the Peak".

== See also ==
- Bagshy
