= James Bagshaw =

James Bagshaw may refer to:

- James Bagshaw (footballer, born 1885) (1885–1966), English football defender
- James Bagshaw (footballer, born 1874) (1874–1941), English football goalkeeper
