= William Miles =

William, Willie, Bill or Billy Miles may refer to:

== Politicians ==
- William Miles (Queensland politician) (1817–1887), Australian politician
- Sir William Miles, 1st Baronet (1797–1878), English politician and agriculturalist
- William Porcher Miles (1822–1899), American politician

== Others ==
- William Augustus Miles (c. 1753–1817), English political writer
- William Ernest Miles (1869–1947), English surgeon
- William H. Miles (1828–1892), American bishop
- William John Miles (1871–1942), Australian businessman and political activist
- Willie Miles, American baseball player
- Dossie Miles (William Percy Miles, 1898–1971), English footballer see List of Watford F.C. players (1–49 appearances)
- Bill Miles (1931–2013), American filmmaker
- Billy Miles, team member in the TV series The Ultimate Fighter: Team Hughes vs. Team Serra
- Billy Miles (The X-Files), character in the American science fiction drama TV series The X-Files, played by Zachary Ansley

== Other uses ==
- William Miles (1808 ship)
- William Miles (1816 ship)
- William Miles (1853 ship)

== See also ==
- Miles (surname)
