= Furs (disambiguation) =

Furs are thick growths of hair that cover the skin of many animals.

Furs may refer to:

- Fur clothing
- Fur people, an ethnic group predominantly inhabiting western Sudan
- Fuero in Spanish, or Fur in Catalan, a Spanish legal term and concept
  - Furs of Valencia, the laws of the Kingdom of Valencia
- The Psychedelic Furs, sometimes The Furs, an English rock band

== See also ==
- Fur (disambiguation)
- Firs, a genus of trees
- Furry fandom, a subculture interested in anthropomorphic animal characters with human personalities and characteristics
