= George Payne (footballer, born 1887) =

English footballer

Personal information
- Full name: George Clark Payne
- Date of birth: 17 February 1887
- Place of birth: Hitchin, England
- Date of death: 21 August 1932 (aged 45)
- Place of death: Clacton-on-Sea, England
- Position: Inside left

Senior career*
Years	Team	Apps	(Gls)
- Hitchin Union Jack
- Hitchin Town
- Barnet Alston
1906–1908	Tottenham Hotspur	7	(3)
1909–1911	Crystal Palace	46	(31)
1911–1912	Sunderland	2	(0)
1912	Leyton		
1912–1913	Woolwich Arsenal	3	(0)
- * Club domestic league appearances and goals

George Clark Payne (17 February 1887 – 1932) was an English professional footballer who played as an inside left. He is mostly noted for his two years in the Southern League with Crystal Palace. Payne also played for Football League clubs Sunderland and Woolwich Arsenal and in the Southern League for Tottenham Hotspur and Leyton.

== Career ==
Payne joined Southern League First Division club Tottenham Hotspur in 1906 and stayed with the club until its election to the Football League in 1908. Following two seasons back in the Southern League with Crystal Palace, for whom he scored prolifically, he transferred to First Division club Sunderland in 1911. After just two appearances, Payne returned to the Southern League with Leyton in January 1912. He made a return to the First Division during the 1912 off-season with Woolwich Arsenal. Payne made just three first team appearances for the Gunners and predominantly played in the South Eastern League with the club's reserves, with whom he scored 9 goals in 16 appearances. He left the club at the end of the 1912–13 season. Serious wounds suffered in combat during the First World War brought an end to Payne's career.

== Personal life ==
Payne was married to Miriam, sister of Hitchin-born footballing brothers George, Harry, Vic and Willie Furr. Payne served as a private in the Bedfordshire Regiment during the First World War and his football career was ended by a gunshot wound to the left thigh suffered in September 1918.

== Career statistics ==
Appearances and goals by club, season and competition
Club	Season	League			FA Cup		Total	
Club	Season	Division	Apps	Goals	Apps	Goals	Apps	Goals
Tottenham Hotspur	1907–08	Southern League First Division	7	3	0	0	7	3
Sunderland	1911–12	First Division	2	0	0	0	2	0
Woolwich Arsenal	1912–13	First Division	3	0	0	0	3	0
Career total			12	3	0	0	12	3
