= Willie Furr =

English footballer

Personal information
- Full name: William Stanley Furr
- Date of birth: 22 July 1891
- Place of birth: Barnet, England
- Date of death: 1975 (aged 83–84)
- Place of death: Biggleswade, England
- Position: Outside right

Senior career*
Years	Team	Apps	(Gls)
- Hitchin Town
1912	Brentford	2	(0)
1912	Leicester Fosse	1	(0)
- Luton Town
1913	Eccles Borough		
1913	Letchworth Town		
1919	Luton Town	1	(0)
- * Club domestic league appearances and goals

William Stanley Furr (22 July 1891 – 1975) was an English professional footballer who played as an outside right in the Football League for Leicester Fosse.

== Personal life ==
Furr's three brothers, George, Harry and Vic also played professional football. His sisters Amelia and Miriam married footballers William Grimes and George Payne respectively.

== Career statistics ==
Appearances and goals by club, season and competition
Club	Season	League			FA Cup		Total	
Club	Season	Division	Apps	Goals	Apps	Goals	Apps	Goals
Brentford	1911–12	Southern League First Division	2	0	0	0	2	0
Leicester Fosse	1912–13	Second Division	1	0	0	0	1	0
Luton Town	1919–20	Southern League First Division	1	0	0	0	1	0
Career total			4	0	0	0	4	0
