= Spencer Lister =

English-born South African doctor and bacteriologist

Sir Spencer Lister
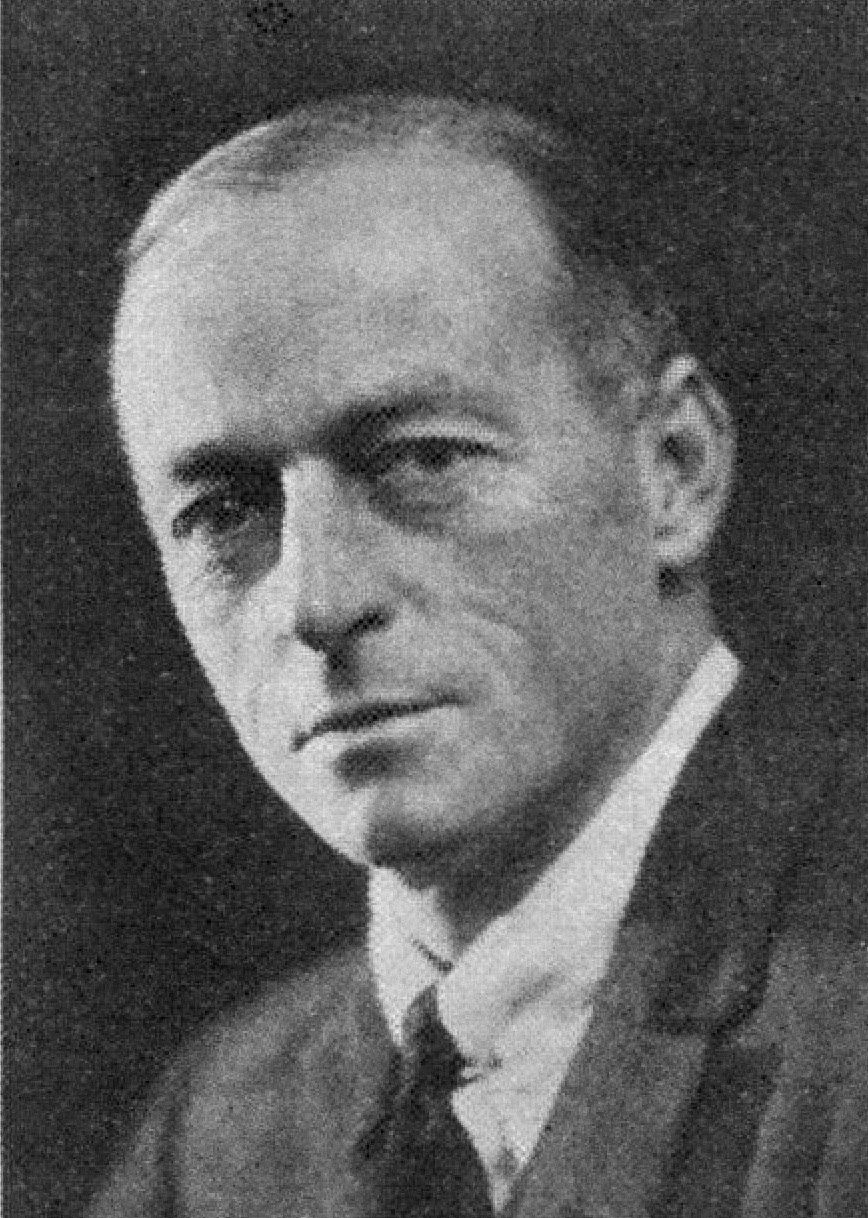
- Born: Frederick Spencer Lister; 8 April 1876; Norwell, Nottinghamshire, England
- Died: 6 September 1939 (aged 63)
- Citizenship: United Kingdom
- Occupation: Physician
- Employer: University of the Witwatersrand
- Awards: Knight Bachelor

Sir Frederick Spencer Lister (8 April 1876 – 6 September 1939) was an English-born South African doctor and bacteriologist.

Lister was born in Norwell, Nottinghamshire. In 1897 he joined West Hertfordshire Football Club (later Watford Football Club) as an amateur association football player, making twelve appearances and scoring three goals for the team in all competitions.

He trained as a doctor at St Bartholomew's Hospital Medical College in London, qualifying in 1905. He then went to the Transvaal, serving as medical officer to the Premier Diamond Mines from 1907 to 1912 and to the Rand Gold Mines near Johannesburg from 1912 to 1917. In 1917 he was appointed Research Bacteriologist at the South African Institute for Medical Research in Johannesburg. He later became Director of the Institute and Professor of Pathology and Bacteriology at the University of the Witwatersrand. From 1928 he served on the South African Medical Council. He wrote important papers on pneumonia and influenza and was also an expert on leprosy.

He was knighted in the 1920 New Year Honours, for services to bacteriology.

Lister died of a heart attack in the library of the Institute for Medical Research.
