= Für =

Für is a Hungarian surname. Notable people with the surname include:

- Anikó Für (born 1964), Hungarian actress
- Lajos Für (1930–2013), Hungarian politician and historian
