= Jimmy Crussell =

English footballer

Personal information
- Full name: James Freshwater Crussell
- Date of birth: 19 February 1904
- Place of birth: Watford, England
- Date of death: 11 December 1983 (aged 79)
- Place of death: Ottery St Mary, England
- Position: Inside forward

Senior career*
Years	Team	Apps	(Gls)
- Watford Grammar School
- Old Fullerians
- Leavesden Road Baptists
- Sun Engraving
1924–1925	Watford	1	(0)
- Tufnell Park
- Clapton

International career
1932	England Amateurs	2	(0)
- * Club domestic league appearances and goals

James Freshwater Crussell (19 February 1904 – 11 December 1983) was an English footballer who played as an inside forward.

== Club career ==
Crussell was educated at Watford Grammar School for Boys, going onto play for the school's representative football teams. Crussell later played for Leavesden Road Baptists and Sun Engraving, before signing for Watford as an amateur in August 1924. On 2 May 1925, Crussell made his only Football League appearance in a 0–0 draw against Charlton Athletic. Following his departure from Watford, Crussell signed for Tufnell Park, before joining Clapton, playing for the club for over a decade. In 1932, Crussell guested for Nunhead on their tour of Luxembourg.

== International career ==
In 1932, Crussell made two appearances for England amateurs.
