= Jack Lee (footballer, born 1890) =

English footballer

Personal information
- Full name: John Lee
- Date of birth: 8 November 1890
- Place of birth: Sheffield, England
- Date of death: 1955 (aged 64–65)
- Height: 5 ft 10 3/4 in (1.80 m)
- Position: Winger

Senior career*
Years	Team	Apps	(Gls)
1912–1913	Bird-in-Hand		
1913–1919	Hull City	75	(19)
1919–1923	Chelsea	7	(1)
1924–1925	Watford	8	(0)
1925–1926	Rotherham United	17	(2)
Total		107	(22)
- * Club domestic league appearances and goals

John Lee (8 November 1890 – 1955) was an English footballer who played in the Football League for Chelsea, Hull City, Rotherham United and Watford.
