= Albert Farrow =

English footballer

Personal information
- Full name: Albert Ernest Farrow
- Date of birth: 1886
- Place of birth: Gainsborough, England
- Date of death: 28 September 1916 (aged 29)
- Place of death: Gainsborough, England
- Position: Left half

Senior career*
Years	Team	Apps	(Gls)
1905–1906	Gainsborough WMC & Institute		
1906–1908	Gainsborough Trinity	35	(1)
1908–1909	Watford	9	(0)
1909–1912	Worksop Town		
- * Club domestic league appearances and goals

Albert Ernest Farrow (1886 – 28 September 1916) was an English professional footballer who played as a left half in the Football League for Gainsborough Trinity.

== Personal life ==
Farrow served as a private in the Lincolnshire Regiment, the Green Howards and the South Staffordshire Regiment during the First World War. He was diagnosed with tuberculosis in 1916 and was discharged from the army in August that year. Farrow died of the disease the following month and was buried in Gainsborough General Cemetery.

== Career statistics ==
Appearances and goals by club, season and competition
Club	Season	League			FA Cup		Total	
Club	Season	Division	Apps	Goals	Apps	Goals	Apps	Goals
Watford	1908–09	Southern League First Division	9	0	0	0	9	0
Career total			9	0	0	0	9	0
