= Chris Pullan =

English footballer

Personal information
- Date of birth: 11 December 1967 (age 58)
- Place of birth: Durham, England
- Height: 5 ft 8 in (1.73 m)
- Position: Defender

Senior career*
Years	Team	Apps	(Gls)
1986–1991	Watford	12	(0)
1988–1989	→ Halifax Town (loan)	5	(1)
1990–1991	Maidstone United	1	(0)
Total		18	(1)
- * Club domestic league appearances and goals

Chris Pullan (born 11 December 1967) is an English former footballer who played in the Football League for Watford, Halifax Town and Maidstone United.
