= Ernie Ison =

English footballer

Personal information
- Full name: Ernest Ison
- Date of birth: 12 June 1903
- Place of birth: Hartshill, England
- Date of death: 26 October 1983 (aged 80)
- Place of death: Burntwood, England
- Height: 5 ft 6 in (1.68 m)
- Position: Outside left

Senior career*
Years	Team	Apps	(Gls)
19??–1922	Chapel End Liberal Club		
1922–1924	Nuneaton Town	56	(5)
1924–1931	Brighton & Hove Albion	16	(0)
1931–1932	Southport	10	(1)
1932–1933	Watford	3	(1)
1933–1936	Ramsgate Athletic		
1937	Ashford Town (Kent)		
- * Club domestic league appearances and goals

Ernest Ison (12 June 1903 – 26 October 1983) was an English professional footballer who played as an outside left in the Football League for Brighton & Hove Albion, Southport and Watford.

He also played non-league football for Nuneaton Town, Ramsgate Athletic and Ashford Town (Kent).

== Life and career ==
Ison was born in 1903 in Hartshill, Warwickshire, to Robert Ison and his wife Emma. He followed his father into coal mining, and played local football for Chapel End Liberal Club before joining Nuneaton Town of the Birmingham & District League ahead of the 1922–23 season. By the middle of the following campaign, he was attracting interest from professional clubs, and Nuneaton's chairman, while denying that a price of £2,000 had been set, stated that "When a suitable offer is made we shall not stand in Ison's way if he wishes to leave". He was selected to represent the Birmingham Association against their London counterparts in December 1923.

In August 1924, Ison signed for Brighton & Hove Albion of the Football League Third Division South in 1924. He had the misfortune of joining Albion when Tug Wilson was already established at outside left: Wilson went on to make 566 appearances in first-team competition, which remains as of 2024 a club record. Although Ison did not make his League debut until April 1926, nearly two full seasons after joining the club, and played just 16 times for the first team, he did set a record of his own, with more than 300 appearances for the club's reserve team. That team won the 1926–27 Southern League Eastern Division, and Ison scored one of the goals as they beat Western Division champions Torquay United 4–0 to win the overall Southern League title.

He signed for Southport in 1931 as replacement for Joe Roberts; the Lancashire Daily Post wrote that he was "regarded as a good capture, being ideally built, with a good turn of speed and accurate ball control." His early performances were reported on with enthusiasm, but a knee injury sustained in mid-September interrupted his progress, He had cartilage surgery in November, and the 1–0 win against New Brighton on 24 October proved to be his last appearance, new arrival Fred Dobson having proved successful on the left wing.

Ison moved on at the end of the season to Watford, scored the winner in the opening Southern Section match of the season, away to Norwich City, was replaced in the team by Jack Barnes for the fourth match, and never played for them again. He returned to non-league football in 1933, spending three years with Ramsgate Athletic while working in the building trade. He also appeared for another Kent League club, Ashford Town (Kent), in 1937. He returned to Warwickshire during the Second World War, working in munitions, and then took up surface work at a coal mine and factory work in Nuneaton.

Ison died in Burntwood, Staffordshire, in 1983 at the age of 80.

== Career statistics ==
Appearances and goals by club, season and competition
Club	Season	League			FA Cup		Other		Total	
Club	Season	Division	Apps	Goals	Apps	Goals	Apps	Goals	Apps	Goals
Nuneaton Town	1922–23	Birmingham & District League	30	2	2	0	4 (Note: Appearances in Birmingham Senior Cup)	1	36	3
Nuneaton Town	1923–24	Birmingham & District League	26	3	4	1	1	0	31	4
Nuneaton Town	Total		56	5	6	1	5	1	67	7
Brighton & Hove Albion	1920–21	Third Division South	0	0	0	0	—		0	0
Brighton & Hove Albion	1925–26	Third Division South	2	0	0	0	—		2	0
Brighton & Hove Albion	1925–26	Third Division South	4	0	0	0	—		4	0
Brighton & Hove Albion	1925–26	Third Division South	0	0	0	0	—		0	0
Brighton & Hove Albion	1925–26	Third Division South	6	0	0	0	—		6	0
Brighton & Hove Albion	1925–26	Third Division South	1	0	0	0	—		1	0
Brighton & Hove Albion	1925–26	Third Division South	3	0	0	0	—		3	0
Brighton & Hove Albion	Total		16	0	0	0	—		16	0
Southport	1931–32	Third Division North	10	1	0	0	1 (Note: Appearance in Lancashire Senior Cup)	0	11	1
Watford	1932–33	Third Division South	3	1	0	0	—		3	1
Career total			85	7	6	1	6	1	97	9
