= William Grimes (footballer) =

English footballer

Personal information
- Full name: William John Grimes
- Date of birth: 27 March 1886
- Place of birth: Ickleford, Hertfordshire, England
- Date of death: 6 January 1936 (aged 49)
- Place of death: Biggleswade, Bedfordshire, England
- Position: Winger

Senior career*
Years	Team	Apps	(Gls)
- Glossop
1908–1910	Bradford City	17	(1)
1910–1914	Derby County	161	(11)
Total		188+	(12+)
- * Club domestic league appearances and goals

William John Grimes (27 March 1886 – 6 January 1936) was an English professional footballer who played as a winger.

== Career ==
Grimes was born in Ickleford, near Hitchin, Hertfordshire. Nicknamed "Curly", he played for Glossop, Bradford City and Derby County.

For Bradford City he made 17 appearances in the Football League. He played 169 times for Derby County, scoring 11 times, 161 of these appearances were in the Football League.

== Personal life ==
In 1907, Grimes married to Amelia Furr, sister of the footballing brothers George, Harry, Vic and Willie Furr.

He later worked as a fishmonger. He died in 1936.

== Sources ==
- Frost, Terry (1988). Bradford City A Complete Record 1903–1988. Breedon Books Sport. ISBN 0-907969-38-0.
