= Harry Furr =

English footballer

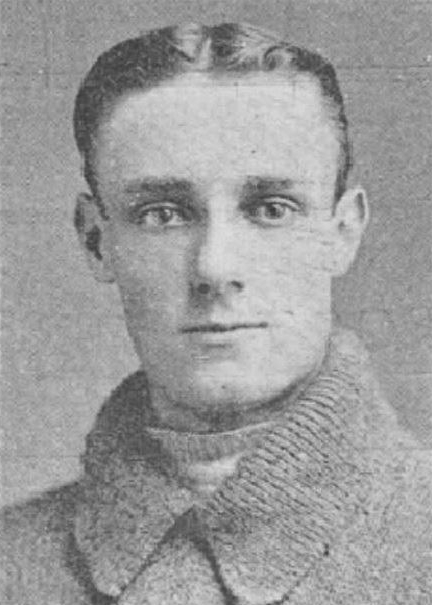
- Furr while with Croydon Common in 1908.

Personal information
- Full name: Harold Frederick Furr
- Date of birth: 13 January 1887
- Place of birth: Barnet, England
- Date of death: 23 November 1971 (aged 84)
- Place of death: Hitchin, England
- Position: Goalkeeper

Senior career*
Years	Team	Apps	(Gls)
1902	Hitchin St John's		
- Hitchin Town
1906–1907	Hitchin Union Jack		
1907	Hitchin Blue Cross		
1907–1908	Hitchin Town		
1908–1911	Croydon Common	8	(0)
1911–1912	Brentford	6	(0)
1912	Croydon Common	0	(0)
1912–1913	Leicester Fosse	8	(0)
1913	Letchworth Town		
1914	Hitchin St Michael's		
- * Club domestic league appearances and goals

Harold Frederick Furr (13 January 1887 – 23 November 1971) was an English professional footballer who played as a goalkeeper in the Football League for Leicester Fosse.

== Personal life ==
Furr's three brothers, George, Vic and Willie also played professional football. His sisters Amelia and Miriam married footballers William Grimes and George Payne respectively.

== Career statistics ==
Appearances and goals by club, season and competition
Club	Season	League			FA Cup		Total	
Club	Season	Division	Apps	Goals	Apps	Goals	Apps	Goals
Croydon Common	1909–10	Southern League First Division	7	0	0	0	7	0
Croydon Common	1910–11	Southern League Second Division	1	0	0	0	1	0
Croydon Common	Total		8	0	0	0	8	0
Brentford	1911–12	Southern League First Division	6	0	2	0	8	0
Leicester Fosse	1912–13	Second Division	8	0	0	0	8	0
Career total			22	0	2	0	24	0
