= Fur (surname) =

Fur is a name that is a common among some Ashkenazi Jews, originating in Russia. Most of their descendants live in the United States and Argentina.
