= Edward Bagshaw =

Edward Bagshaw or Bagshawe may refer to:

- Sir Edward Bagshawe of Finglas (died 1657), MP and commissioner of the revenue
- Edward Bagshaw (MP) the elder (c. 1589–1662), English author and politician
- Edward Bagshaw (theologian) the younger (1629–1671), English Nonconformist minister and theologian
- Edward Bagshawe (bishop) (1829–1915), English bishop of Nottingham
