= Leo Markham =

English footballer (born 1953)

Personal information
- Date of birth: 22 March 1953 (age 73)
- Place of birth: High Wycombe, England
- Position: Central defender

Senior career*
Years	Team	Apps	(Gls)
1969–1972	Marlow	?	(?)
1972–1975	Watford	33	(3)
1975	Wimbledon	0	(0)
1975–1976	Bedford Town	43	(5)
1976–1977	Wimbledon	15	(6)
1977–1983	Aylesbury United	123	(27)

Managerial career
- 1979–1982: Aylesbury United
- * Club domestic league appearances and goals

Leo Sargent Markham (born 22 March 1953) is an English former professional footballer who played in the Football League, as a defender.
