= Fake fur (disambiguation) =

Fake fur is any material designed to resemble fur.

Fake fur may also refer to:

- Fake Fur (album), an album by the Japanese rock band Spitz
- Fake Fur (manga), a Japanese manga by Satomi Yamagata
- Tiger Fake Fur, a pseudonym of Makoto Kawamoto
