= Gordon Mee =

English footballer

Personal information
- Full name: Gordon Mee
- Date of birth: 13 May 1913
- Place of birth: Belper, England
- Date of death: 9 January 1975 (aged 61)
- Place of death: Hove, England
- Height: 5 ft 11 in (1.80 m)
- Position: Goalkeeper

Senior career*
Years	Team	Apps	(Gls)
- Pottery Wesleyans
19??–1935	Matlock Town		
1935–1945	Brighton & Hove Albion	41	(0)
1945–1946	Watford	0	(0)
- * Club domestic league appearances and goals

Gordon Mee (13 May 1913 – 9 January 1975) was an English professional footballer who played as a goalkeeper in the Football League for Brighton & Hove Albion.

Mee was born in 1913 in Belper, Derbyshire. He played football for the Pottery Wesleyans club in the town before joining Matlock Town. After a trial, he turned professional with Brighton & Hove Albion of the Football League Third Division South in January 1935. He never became first choice, but was a reliable backup for the rest of the decade. He was a police reservist during the war, and spent the first post-war season with Watford, appearing in the 1945–46 FA Cup. He died in Hove, Sussex, in 1975 at the age of 61.

== Career statistics ==
Appearances and goals by club, season and competition
Club	Season	League			FA Cup		Other		Total	
Club	Season	Division	Apps	Goals	Apps	Goals	Apps	Goals	Apps	Goals
Brighton & Hove Albion	1934–35	Third Division South	0	0	0	0	0	0	0	0
Brighton & Hove Albion	1935–36	Third Division South	7	0	0	0	0	0	7	0
Brighton & Hove Albion	1935–36	Third Division South	3	0	0	0	0	0	3	0
Brighton & Hove Albion	1937–38	Third Division South	15	0	0	0	0	0	15	0
Brighton & Hove Albion	1938–39	Third Division South	16	0	0	0	0	0	16	0
Brighton & Hove Albion	Total		41	0	0	0	0	0	41	0
Watford	1945–46	—			8	0	—		8	0
Career total			41	0	8	0	0	0	49	0
