= Vic Furr =

English footballer (1897–1976)

Personal information
- Full name: Victor Reginald Furr
- Date of birth: 26 April 1897
- Place of birth: Hitchin, England
- Date of death: 16 October 1976 (aged 79)
- Place of death: Winterton-on-Sea, England
- Position: Outside right

Senior career*
Years	Team	Apps	(Gls)
–1924	Hitchin Town		
1924–1926	Watford	1	(0)
- Hitchin Town
- * Club domestic league appearances and goals

Victor Reginald Furr (26 April 1897 – 16 October 1976) was an English professional footballer who played as an outside right in the Football League for Watford.

== Personal life ==
Furr's three brothers, George, Harry and Willie, also played professional football. His sisters Amelia and Miriam married footballers William Grimes and George Payne respectively.

== Career statistics ==
Appearances and goals by club, season and competition
Club	Season	League			FA Cup		Total	
Club	Season	Division	Apps	Goals	Apps	Goals	Apps	Goals
Watford	1924–25	Third Division South	1	0	0	0	1	0
Career Total			1	0	0	0	1	0
