= Furry =

Furry may refer to:

- Being covered with fur
- Furry fandom, a subculture interested in non-human animal characters with human personalities and characteristics
  - Furry convention, a formal gathering of those who participate in the furry fandom
- Wendell H. Furry (1907–1984), an American physicist
- Furry Lewis (Walter E. Lewis, 1893 or 1899–1981), an American country blues guitarist and songwriter
- Furry Creek, British Columbia, a community in Canada
