= James Bagshaw (footballer, born 1874) =

English footballer

Personal information
- Full name: James Edward Bagshaw
- Date of birth: 1874
- Place of birth: Grimsby, England
- Date of death: 19 January 1941 (aged 66–67)
- Position: Goalkeeper

Senior career*
Years	Team	Apps	(Gls)
1891–1892	Britannia		
1892–1893	Grimsby Thursday		
1893–1894	Grimsby Town	0	(0)
1894–1896	Grimsby All Saints		
1896–1898	Gainsborough Trinity	58	(0)
1898–1899	Grimsby Town	34	(0)
1899	Scarborough		
1899–1909	Gainsborough Trinity	289	(0)
- * Club domestic league appearances and goals

James Edward Bagshaw (1874 – 19 January 1941) was an English professional footballer who played as a goalkeeper.
