= George Furr =

English footballer

Personal information
- Full name: George Melville Furr
- Date of birth: 14 August 1885
- Place of birth: Barnet, England
- Date of death: 2 January 1967 (aged 81)
- Place of death: Letchworth, England
- Position: Outside right

Senior career*
Years	Team	Apps	(Gls)
- Hitchin St John's
- Hitchin Town
1906	Biggleswade		
1906–1909	Watford	37	(3)
1909–1910	Manchester City	3	(0)
1911–1912	Croydon Common	2	(0)
1912	Watford	0	(0)
- * Club domestic league appearances and goals

George Melville Furr (14 August 1885 – 2 January 1967) was an English professional footballer who played as an outside right in the Football League for Manchester City.

== Personal life ==
Furr's three brothers, Harry, Vic and Willie, also played professional football and his son played football as an amateur. His sisters Amelia and Miriam married footballers William Grimes and George Payne respectively. Furr followed his father into fishmongery and built up a number of fishmongers and chip shops across Hertfordshire.

== Career statistics ==
Appearances and goals by club, season and competition
Club	Season	League			FA Cup		Total	
Club	Season	Division	Apps	Goals	Apps	Goals	Apps	Goals
Watford	1907–08	Southern League First Division	20	3	0	0	20	3
Watford	1908–09	Southern League First Division	17	0	3	0	20	0
Watford	Total		37	3	3	0	40	3
Manchester City	1909–10	Second Division	3	0	0	0	3	0
Croydon Common	1911–12	Southern League Second Division	2	0	1	0	3	0
Career Total			42	3	4	0	46	3
