= James Bagshaw (footballer, born 1885) =

English footballer

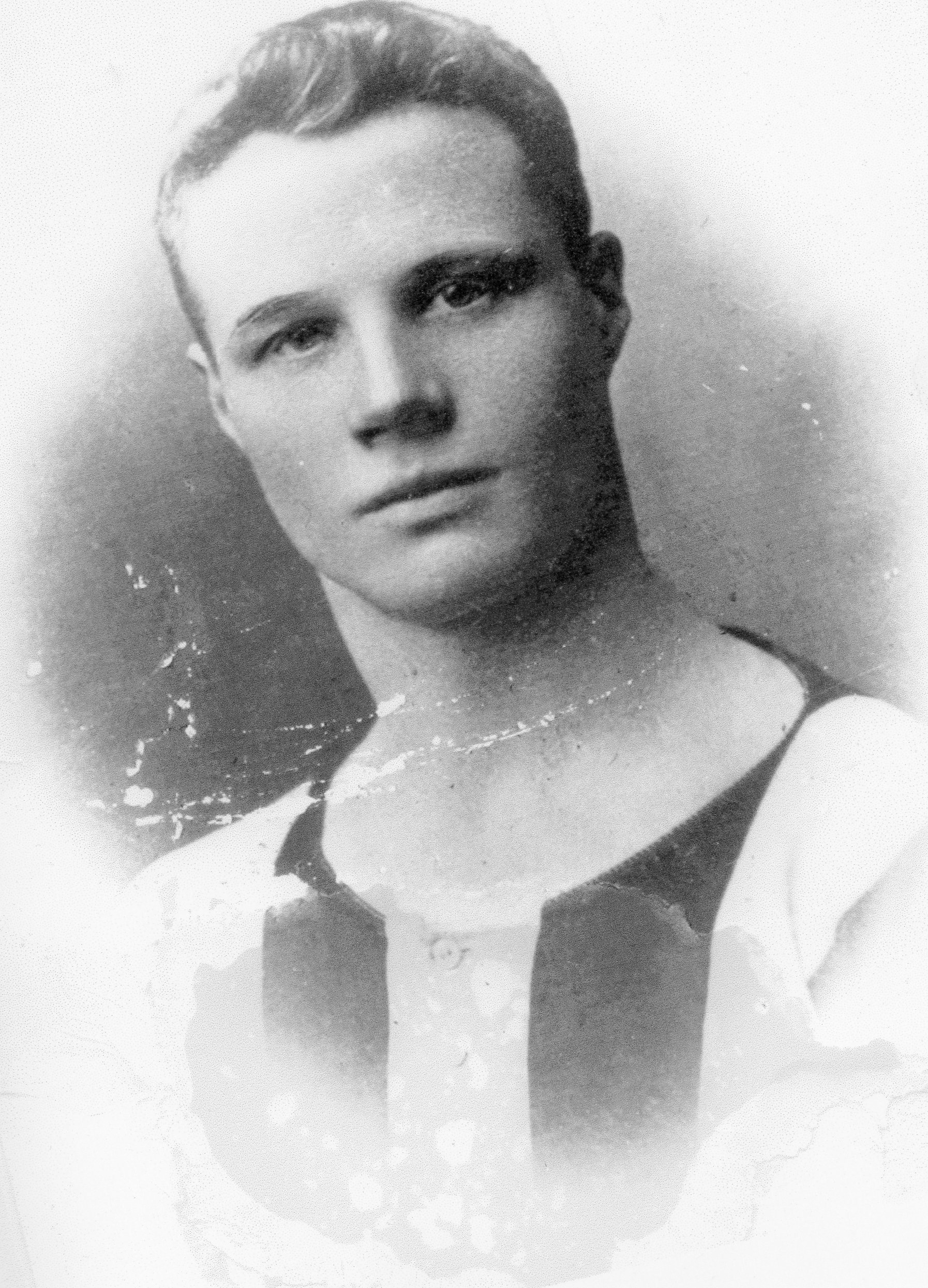

Personal information
- Full name: John James Bagshaw
- Date of birth: 25 December 1885
- Place of birth: Derby, England
- Date of death: 25 August 1966 (aged 80)
- Place of death: Nottingham, England
- Position: Defender

Senior career*
Years	Team	Apps	(Gls)
- Graham Street Prims
- Fletcher's Athletic
1906–1920	Derby County		
1920–1921	Notts County		
1921–1922	Watford	14	(0)
1922–?	Ilkeston United		
- Grantham

International career
1919	England	1	(0)
- * Club domestic league appearances and goals

John James Bagshaw (25 December 1885 – 25 August 1966) was an English footballer who spent the majority of his career with Derby County. He also represented the England national side. He was a defender who could play anywhere along the half-back line.

Bagshaw was born in Derby, and began playing football with Graham Street Prims. He also played for Fletcher's Athletic, his works team. After being invited to play in a trial match by Derby County, he was signed b the club in October 1906. His career with the club was split by the First World War, during which all league football was suspended. Bagshaw did however represent Notts County in war-time friendlies. He continued his career with Derby after the end of war and in 1919 he won his sole full cap for England. He also played an unofficial game for England in a "Victory International".

He left Derby in February 1920, having won two Second Division titles in his time with the club. He joined Notts County and subsequently moved to Watford for £200 in May 1921. He played 14 games for the club, all in the league.

In 1922 he joined Ilkeston United on a free transfer, and later played for Grantham. After retiring from playing he worked as a scout for Nottingham Forest, Notts County and Coventry City, as well as being on Forest's training staff during the Second World War. He died in Nottingham, aged 80.
