= Jack Chapman =

Jack Chapman may refer to:

- Jack Chapman (baseball)
- Jack Chapman (footballer)
- Jack Chapman (speedway rider)

== See also ==
- John Chapman (disambiguation)
- Jake Chapman, British artist
