= John Chapman =

John Chapman may refer to:

== Military ==
- John Chapman (Medal of Honor, 1865) (1844–1905), French soldier who fought in the American Civil War
- John Chapman (Australian Army officer) (1896–1963), Australian Army general of WWII
- John A. Chapman (1965–2002), USAF Combat Controller, posthumously awarded the Medal of Honor

== Politicians ==
=== United Kingdom ===
- John Chapman (Leicester MP) represented Leicester (UK Parliament constituency)
- Sir John Chapman, 2nd Baronet (c. 1710–1781), British Member of Parliament for Taunton, 1741–1747
- John Chapman (Grimsby MP) (1810–1877), British Member of Parliament for Grimsby, 1862–1865 and 1874–1877

=== United States ===
- John Chapman (Pennsylvania politician) (1740–1800), United States Representative from Pennsylvania
- John Grant Chapman (1798–1856), Maryland politician
- John Lee Chapman (1811–1880), American politician
- John William Chapman (1894–1978), Lieutenant Governor of Illinois

=== Other countries ===
- John Otho Chapman (1931–2011), politician in Saskatchewan, Canada
- John Chapman (Australian politician) (1879–1931), Australian senator

== Sportspeople ==
- Jack Chapman (baseball) (1843–1916), baseball player and manager
- Jack Chapman (footballer) (1895–?), English footballer
- John Chapman (baseball) (1899–1953), former shortstop
- John Chapman (cricketer, born 1877) (1877–1956), English cricketer
- John Chapman (cricketer, born 1814) (1814–1896), English cricketer
- John Chapman (New Zealand cricketer) (1865–1949), New Zealand cricketer
- John Chapman (football manager) (1882–1948), footballer and manager
- Johnny Chapman (born 1967), NASCAR driver
- John Chapman (rugby league) (born 1954), Australian rugby league player
- John Chapman (harness racing) (1928–1980), Canadian driver

== Religion ==
- John Wilbur Chapman (1859–1918), American Presbyterian evangelist
- John Chapman (priest) (1865–1933), British priest, abbot, and religious scholar
- John Chapman (evangelist) (1930–2012), Australian evangelist
- John Chapman (bishop), Anglican bishop in Canada

== Writers ==
- John Chapman (theologian) (1704–1784), English cleric and scholar
- John Chapman (engineer) (1801–1854), English political and economic writer
- John Jay Chapman (1862–1933), American essayist and dramatist
- John Chapman (screenwriter) (1927–2001), English playwright and screenwriter

== Other people ==
- Johnny Appleseed (John Chapman, 1774–1845), pioneer nurseryman and missionary
- John Gadsby Chapman (1808–1889), American artist
- John Chapman (publisher) (1821–1894), publisher of the Westminster Review
- John Ratcliffe Chapman (1815–1899), British-American rifle scope designer
- John Henry Chapman (1860–1942), British businessman and philatelist
- John Herbert Chapman (1921–1979), Canadian space researcher
- John Chapman (artist) (born 1946), British artist
- John Norman Chapman (born 1947), American murderer
- John Chapman (producer), British television producer

== See also ==
- Jonathan Chapman (1807–1848), American politician
