= List of Terry and June episodes =

This is a list of all the episodes for the British sitcom Terry and June, which originally aired on BBC1 from 24 October 1979 to 31 August 1987.

Each episode is approximately 30 minutes long. The first seven series had six episodes each, with the eighth series consisting of 12 episodes and the ninth (and final) series consisting of seven episodes.

The first series aired from 24 October to 28 November 1979 on Wednesdays at 8.30pm. The second series from 5 September to 10 October 1980 on Fridays at 8.20pm, followed by a Christmas special on 23 December 1980 at 7.15pm. Series Three aired on Fridays at 7.30pm from 13 November to 18 December 1981, with a Christmas special on 28 December 1981 at 6.35pm, and the fourth series aired from 5 January to 9 February 1982 on Tuesdays at 8.00pm.

The fifth series aired from 19 October to 23 November 1982 on Tuesdays at 7.40pm. The 1982 Christmas special aired on Christmas Eve at 8.40pm. Series Six aired from 15 February to 22 March 1983 on Tuesdays at 7.50pm, followed by Series Seven from 31 October to 12 December 1983 on Mondays at 6.50pm.

The eighth (and penultimate) series aired from 7 September to 23 November 1985 on Saturdays at 5.50pm. Series Eight's unusual episode count (twelve episodes, originally thirteen before an episode was dropped, and the 1985 Christmas Special which was filmed as part of the Series Eight filming block) owes to the fact that it was originally penned as a double-length series, that the BBC could choose to break over two separate series of broadcasts if they so opted to, as they had done with Series Three and Four; and the DVD releases also reflect this option by releasing Series Eight as two halves, although ultimately Series Eight was broadcast as one long series. A run-down of upcoming episodes in several BBC in-house literature for the then-forthcoming 1984-85 production season makes mention of an ultimately 'missing' final episode of Series 8, "Computer Games"; Although a script for this episode exists, the episode doesn't appear to have entered production, seemingly due to the final recording slot instead given over to recording the 1985 Christmas Special.

Series Eight was followed by a Christmas special on 24 December 1985 at 9.00pm. The ninth (and final) series aired from 20 July to 31 August 1987 on Mondays at 8.30pm. Several scripts for a proposed Series Ten were submitted, but the series was not renewed.

== Series overview ==
Series	Episodes	Originally released	
Series	Episodes	First released	Last released
1	6	24 October 1979	28 November 1979
2	6	5 September 1980	10 October 1980
Special		23 December 1980	
3	6	13 November 1981	18 December 1981
Special		28 December 1981	
4	6	5 January 1982	9 February 1982
5	6	19 October 1982	23 November 1982
Special		24 December 1982	
6	6	15 February 1983	22 March 1983
7	6	31 October 1983	12 December 1983
8	12	7 September 1985	23 November 1985
Special		24 December 1985	
9	7	20 July 1987	31 August 1987

== Episodes ==
=== Series 1 (1979) ===
No.	Title	Directed by	Written by	Original release date
1	"Long Weekend"	Peter Whitmore	John Kane	24 October 1979
Terry has been promoted to Assistant Sales Manager at PlaySafe Ltd, 'the fire extinguisher people' and he and June are moving into their new house. On Friday evening they arrive at 26, Elm Tree Avenue, in Purley, Surrey, to decorate before they move in. The weekend gets off to a bad start when they arrive late at the house after traffic problems. The following day they start to decorate, and the wallpaper peels off. On Sunday, neighbours Brian (Roland Curram) and Tina Pillbeam (Anita Graham) arrive to introduce themselves, and tell Terry and June about the previous owners, all of whom were odd in different ways. They then discover a hidden door in the kitchen – but it leads only to a toilet. Part of the toilet then falls on Terry's head, and he ends up in hospital. (Tariq Yunis and Sarah Lesley also appear in this episode.)
2	"On the Move"	Peter Whitmore	John Kane	31 October 1979
After twenty-three years in their old home, Terry and June prepare to move to their new house in Purley, but just before leaving, their daughter Wendy (Jessica Turner) turns up. She tells them that she has left her husband Roger (Kit Thacker), believing he has been having an affair with his secretary, Marjorie (Adrienne Burgess). They are just about to leave again when Roger arrives. He then explains how he was just looking after Marjorie, going with her for the odd trip to the cinema and theatre, while her husband was away doing a training course in Germany. Meanwhile, Mr. Ridge (George A. Cooper), the man responsible for the move, gets increasingly annoyed with the delay, and starts to unload the van until Roger talks him round. (Beatrice Shaw, Harry Fielder and Ridgewell Hawkes also appear in this episode.) Note: The episode was originally written as the Pilot. However, when it became apparent that Long Weekend would be used as the first episode broadcast, several lines and minor details were altered in that script in order for it to air first without breaking continuity with this episode.
3	"Flying Carpets"	Peter Whitmore	John Kane	7 November 1979
When Terry and June's new carpet does not arrive, Brian offers to get Nigel (Colin McCormack), a friend, to get a carpet for him at a reduced price. Nigel manages to get a cut-off from the carpet installed in the new top floor executive suite at Terry's workplace. The morning after Nigel, and his uncle Vernon, (Leslie Dwyer) have laid Terry and June's new sitting-room carpet, however, Malcolm and Beattie – Terry's boss and his wife (Terence Alexander, Rosemary Frankau) – arrive for lunch, and Malcolm tells him that during the night the company's new executive suite carpet has been stolen. Terry then tries to hide his new carpet, thinking they are the same. That night, Terry insists they return the carpet, and June, Brian and Tina accompany him. Terry and June get stuck in a window cleaner's lift while trying to get to the right floor and are discovered in the morning by Malcolm. The security man (Stuart Sherwin), however, says that the Medfords acquired their carpet legally, and so they quickly lie to say they were giving their carpet to the company to replace the stolen one.
4	"A Bridge too Far"	Peter Whitmore	John Kane	14 November 1979
At work, Terry agrees to play on behalf of the company at a bridge championship, in the hope of impressing the Chairman of the Board Sir Dennis Hodge (Reginald Marsh). Terry has never played bridge before but believes he can learn in the week that remains until the game. However, Sir Dennis telephones that same evening, and suggests they have a practice match so that they can judge each other's playing ability. Terry cannot get out of it, and Sir Dennis soon arrives with Major Pritchard (Anthony Howard) and Admiral Boyd (Noel Coleman) to play. Terry then tries to delay the match while June goes out to a phone box to ring home pretending there is an emergency so Terry can leave. However, before this can happen Terry bangs his head on the card table, and pretends the bang has given him amnesia and made him forget how to play bridge. (Heather Bell also appears in this episode.)
5	"Writing On the Wall"	Peter Whitmore	John Kane	21 November 1979
Terry is outraged when he sees some vandalism written on a nearby wall, and believes that not enough people take an interest in children these days. When Tina then brings Magnus (Wayne Norman) her 12-year-old nephew round, and asks Terry to help him make a costume for the Church Fancy Dress Parade, June forces Terry to accept. Magnus wants to go as a pirate, but Terry insists on building a model of the Starship Enterprise that Magnus can get into. On the day of the Parade, Magnus has a rash and Terry decides to get in the model himself, but accidentally gets towed away by a van. It soon turns out that Magnus' rash is in fact red paint, as he is the child responsible for the recent vandalism. (John Warner and Barry Howard also appear in this episode.)
6	"Animal Crackers"	Peter Whitmore	John Kane	28 November 1979
Terry and June find a budgerigar outside their bedroom window, and after returning it to its owner via the Police, they think about getting pets. Before Terry can decide, June agrees to 'dog sit' Boobalinka, a Yorkshire Terrier, for a friend, as well as many other animals, including budgerigars, rabbits, a ferret, Guinea pigs, gerbils, mice, goldfish, terrapins, ants and a Grass snake; much to Terry's annoyance. Soon, Terry lets the dog out, not realising it will run away. He then searches the streets for it, and accidentally goes into the wrong house thinking she is inside. June persuades the house's owners (Peter Stenson and Sue Lynne) that it was a genuine mistake. Hours after running away, the dog returns on its own and eats Terry's steak. (Brian Jameson, Deborah Fairfax and Derek Martin also appear in this episode.)

=== Series 2 (1980) ===
No.	Title	Directed by	Written by	Original release date
7	"To Catch a Thief"	Peter Whitmore	John Kane	5 September 1980
Terry returns home with a new, Princess, company car. June teaches Terry a mnemonic method for remembering the registration number. The following morning Terry leaves the house and finds the car stolen. Terry then reports the theft to Sgt. Tucker (John Junkin) at the Police Station, and though he has problems remembering the registration number, the mnemonic comes to his aid. The next day, he wakes up to find the car returned with a note saying a couple had borrowed it to take the wife to hospital as she was in labour. As a thank you, they enclose two tickets to the theatre that night, a West End show – Rodgers & Hammerstein's The King & I. Terry has a car alarm fitted to the car, but accidentally sets it off when they leave the theatre district and is questioned by a police officer (Michael Sharvell-Martin) as the car is still reported stolen. When they return home, they find everything in their house has been stolen; the theatre tickets being a diversion to get them out of the house. Shortly after their return home however, Sgt. Tucker tells them that the van with all their belongings has been found. (Roy Holder and Geoffrey Morgan also appear in this episode.) Note: Terry keeps his Princess car for the rest of the series' run, although its exact model and colour change several times over the years.
8	"Words of Love"	Peter Whitmore	John Kane	12 September 1980
After watching an old romantic film, the 1940s classic Now, Voyager, Terry and June decide there is not enough romance in their marriage any more. For June's birthday, Terry decides to buy her a piece of jewellery, and asks his secretary Melanie Coolidge (Janie Booth) to take it to the jewellers to get it personalised. Meanwhile, before coming to dinner to celebrate June's birthday, Beattie finds a letter in Malcolm's papers that suggests he is having an affair. Despite it not being his letter, Malcolm persuades Beattie the letter is Terry's, to get any suspicion off him, and she thinks Terry and Miss Coolidge are having an affair. That evening, to oblige Malcolm, Terry tells Beattie that Miss Coolidge is infatuated with him, and Beattie accepts this explanation for the letter. Miss Coolidge arrives to give Terry his present for June, but Terry has to hide her in the hall cupboard before she has handed over the engraved jewellery to prevent June seeing her. Her fiancé Cyril Parsons (Robin Parkinson) then arrives, looking for her and it turns out the letter Beattie found was addressed to him, and Terry gives June her present.
9	"Uncle Terry and Auntie June"	Peter Whitmore	Dave Freeman	19 September 1980
Terry's nephew, Alan (Roger Martin), arrives to stay for a few days as he is doing business in the area. He soon takes a large delivery of gorgonzola, much to Terry and June's annoyance. Alan gives them a cash and carry card, borrowed from his boss Humphries Belvedere. When Terry goes to collect the food June has bought, he is arrested by the Police who believe he is Humphries Belvedere. Thinking they are arresting him for using the cash and carry card under false pretences, Terry pretends he is Belvedere, until it turns out Belvedere is wanted for a series of robberies. June then arrives, not realising Terry's predicament and also says Terry is Belvedere. However, Terry soon realises and, with Alan's help, the Police do not charge Terry and June and let them go. Belvedere is later arrested and Alan is let off as he did not know about Belvedere's thefts. (Colin McCormack, Norman Comer, Michael Napier Brown, Gordon Salkilld and Anthony Arundell also appear in this episode.)
10	"Disco Fever"	Peter Whitmore	John Kane	26 September 1980
There is a shakeup at Terry’s work when Sir Dennis’ nephew becomes head of personnel and starts to fire the older members of staff. The nephew decides to hold the company’s annual dance at a disco club, so Malcolm gives Terry some disco dancing books and tapes. He and June practice at home and a week later attend a disco dancing class run by Steve the dance instructor, (Tony Anholt), with Terry nearly backing out until he sees the attractive dancer Linda Bottomley (Susie Silvey). Though Terry's style is "more Edmundo Ros than John Travolta", he and June enter the dance class and Terry enjoys himself – until he catches sight of himself in a mirror. On the night of the dance, Terry and June refuse to dance, and Sir Dennis praises Terry for his “integrity”. Sir Dennis then says that his nephew will be demoted back to the mailing department the next morning. Note: This episode is also known as Terry Gets the Fever and Terry Gets Disco Fever. Due to copyright clearance issues, one track of music heard during one scene is replaced with a more generic track on the DVD and modern broadcast versions, with a couple of lines of dialogue spoken over the original also missing for the same reason.
11	"Workers Unite"	Peter Whitmore	Jon Watkins	3 October 1980
June is working temporarily as a market researcher while Mrs. Bates is sick, and arguments soon begin with Terry about the domestic chores. One evening both go out for business dinners, June with her supervisor Ronnie Fairclub (Rex Robinson), and Terry with a business associate Angela (Elizabeth Morgan). Without realising it, they end up at the same restaurant and June overhears Terry make some disparaging comments about her. When Terry gets home, he explains and June understands. Terry soon starts to feel neglected as June gets busier, and she starts to get fed up with working, traipsing the streets well into the evening, and to Terry’s delight, decides to give up her job.
12	"Only Two Can Play"	Peter Whitmore	Jon Watkins	10 October 1980
After his doctor tells him to take up a hobby, Terry starts to paint, although June, and neighbour Arthur Potts, are critical of his paintings – much to Terry's annoyance – "I bet Whistler didn't have people looking over his shoulder saying – I don't like the look of your mother." Terry then persuades June to take up a hobby herself, and she decides on the cello, and takes lessons. Terry is encouraging, – but soon regrets this, as she plays awfully. He seeks refuge with his neighbour Arthur Potts (John Rolfe), although he soon moves to Torquay. Terry does not have the courage to tell June she plays awfully. Terry gives up painting when an old school friend of June’s, Millie (Shirley Dixon), an artist, criticises one of his paintings. June later decides to give up her cello lessons, having realised she cannot play, and a delighted Terry puts the cello up for sale.

=== Christmas Special (1980) ===
No.	Title	Directed by	Written by	Original release date
13	"The Christmas Show (The Mink Coat)"	Peter Whitmore	John Kane	23 December 1980
Malcolm buys Beattie a mink coat and asks Terry to look after it for him. June finds it hidden under the bed and mistakenly thinks Terry has bought it for her.

=== Series 3 (1981) ===
No.	Title	Directed by	Written by	Original release date
14	"The Lawnmower"	Peter Whitmore	Dave and Greg Freeman	13 November 1981
Terry discovers that his old neighbour Frank Wilson has moved to Saudi Arabia and let his house fully furnished including a lawnmower that Terry had lent him. However, their new neighbours Tarquin (Allan Cuthbertson) and Melinda (Joan Benham) Spry refuse to return the lawnmower as it was included in the property inventory that he signed. When Terry and his nephew Alan attempt to reclaim the lawnmower, Alan forgets to bring the torch so has to light a match to see what they're doing. The shed has many fireworks which Tarquin and Melinda plan to use for their Mexican themed house-warming party. Alan burns his fingers and drops the match setting off the fireworks. The next day, having received notice that the lawnmower was not meant to be included on the inventory, Tarquin returns the lawnmower to Terry. Unfortunately, it has been badly burnt in the shed fire caused by the fireworks the previous evening.
15	"Stars On Sunday"	Peter Whitmore	John Kane	20 November 1981
Terry and June visit Malcolm who is in hospital after a suspected heart attack and they get roped into helping the hospital radio station. They plan to perform a play written by one of the nursing staff; Terry plans to host a discussion on the state of the hospital food (which causes the catering staff to strike), while June plans to host a cookery spot. Unfortunately, things don't go to plan during the live performance when Terry and Malcolm drop their scripts on the floor leading to utter confusion.
16	"It's A Knockout"	Peter Whitmore	John Kane	27 November 1981
Terry is keeping June awake learning French for a job interview in his firm's new Brussels department which chairman Sir Dennis Hodge (Reginald Marsh) is launching to combat the Japanese dominance in European fire extinguisher sales. After midnight their nephew Alan arrives expecting them to store a collection of rabbit costumes and giant carrots, which are part of his latest business deal, in their spare bedroom. Surprisingly, Terry's interview goes well and Sir Dennis invites himself to dinner to assess the hospitality skills of the Medfords. So when Alan arrives with four Japanese businessmen to see the rabbit costumes moments before Sir Dennis arrives Terry and June are in for a hectic evening.
17	"Friends And Neighbours"	Peter Whitmore	Jon Watkins	4 December 1981
June wants Terry to help in the garden but Terry refuses as it is Sunday. Their attractive new neighbour Cynthia Hunter (Jo Rowbottom) arrives wanting help to move paving slabs and Terry is only too willing to lend a hand. Later, June goes round to remind Terry that they have guests about to arrive and finds him in a compromising position with Cynthia. When Malcolm and Beattie arrive they are also in the middle of a row. June tries to reason with Malcolm while Terry tries to calm Beattie which leads to her leaving Malcolm. Days later Malcolm demands that Terry arrange a date with Cynthia which leads June to find Terry in another compromising position. On returning home, Terry attempts to get Malcolm to explain the situation to June, but discovers that Malcolm and Beattie are reconciled which prevents Malcolm from exonerating Terry. June eventually believes Terry and all ends well.
18	"The Chaotic Peaceful Weekend"	Peter Whitmore	Dave and Greg Freeman	11 December 1981
The Medfords are having a weekend away at the pub which Terry's nephew Alan manages. When they arrive Alan informs them that the area managers are coming to inspect the pub and asks them to help as he is short-staffed. He leaves them in charge while he goes to collect the barmaid whose moped has broken down. The area managers arrive unknown to the Medfords and observe a catalogue of disasters including Terry's wet socks in the hot food container and a severe shortage of drinking vessels. When Alan returns the area manager tells him how incompetent they have been and orders him to sack Terry and June giving them one week's wages in lieu of notice, which Terry readily accepts.
19	"In Sickness And In Health"	Peter Whitmore	John Kane	18 December 1981
Terry's superior, Malcolm, who is due to go to a company seminar in Eastbourne starting on Monday, is struck down by flu, so company chairman Sir Dennis insists that Terry must go instead. Terry is delighted, viewing it as a free five-day holiday, but on the Friday night before the event he begins to develop the symptoms of flu. June advises him to call Sir Dennis and get someone else to take his place, but Terry is sure he can shake it off before they leave as he believes he has a much better constitution than Malcolm. After two days of being waited on in bed Terry is feeling much better, but by Sunday morning June has developed the same symptoms. Terry believes that if he looks after everything she will be sufficiently recovered to accompany him to Eastbourne the next day. They do make it to Eastbourne, albeit with Terry in a wheelchair having broken his leg by falling down the stairs while he was looking after June.

=== Christmas Special (1981) ===
No.	Title	Directed by	Written by	Original release date
20	"Festive Doldrums"	Peter Whitmore	John Kane	28 December 1981
Malcolm's continuous affairs with younger women cause a bust up between himself and Beattie, when he receives a Christmas card from another woman.

=== Series 4 (1982) ===
No.	Title	Directed by	Written by	Original release date
21	"A Piece of the Action"	John B. Hobbs	John Kane	5 January 1982
June wins a prize in a raffle run by Terry's company. Sir Dennis's secretary Miss Fennel presents them with a 3000 piece jigsaw. Malcolm laughs and says jigsaws are for children and that Terry will not have time anyway as he wants him to do a report for Sir Dennis. Unfortunately, Malcolm has given him the wrong data and as he cannot collect it until Monday, Terry and June spend all weekend fitting the jigsaw together only to find the last piece is not from their jigsaw. On Monday morning Sir Dennis is waiting for the report while Malcolm and Terry argue about who should take the blame. When June and Malcolm's wife Beattie crash into Sir Dennis's Rolls-Royce they agree that Terry will take the blame for the crash if Malcolm claims responsibility for the delayed report. In Sir Dennis's office June admits to the crash, but his anger soon subsides when Terry drops his erroneous piece of jigsaw and Sir Dennis discovers it is the missing piece from his jigsaw. They swap pieces leaving Malcolm to explain about the report. Note: Series Four was filmed in the same production block as Series Three, giving the BBC the option of airing the episodes as one long series or breaking them down as two small series. Ultimately they became aired as two separate series, but with Series 4 beginning just over two weeks after the end of Series Three, and with the 1981 Christmas Special broadcast in between, causing very little actual break between the two series, and leading to several sources to consequentially list them as all Series Three.
22	"Snookered"	John B. Hobbs	Terry Ravenscroft	12 January 1982
Terry buys a second-hand half-size snooker table for £30. He is sure that he is as good as a professional. After challenging June to a game he realises that he is awful and decides to sell it. Unaware that Terry has put an Ad in the paper, June sells it to the dustman. When people start offering Terry double and triple the asking price he thinks it is an antique and buys it back off the dustman for £70. He takes it to an antique shop (doing £40 of damage in the shop) only for them to tell him it is rubbish. But Terry refuses to believe that and pays another expert £30 for a second opinion, only to receive the same answer. Eventually, the man that Terry bought the table from asks to buy it back as he misses it. Terry refuses but soon changes his mind when he discovers that the newspaper has mistakenly put his phone number next to the description of a full-sized snooker table.
23	"Camping"	John B. Hobbs	Dave and Greg Freeman	19 January 1982
Terry's neighbours bring their film reels round of their recent holiday. Wishing they could go on holiday, Terry and June decide to take up camping as a less expensive option. They decide to test it out in the garden one night but are bitten by insects, interrupted by neighbours and Terry is annoyed when he finds June watching TV back in the house. Terry locks the house and throws the key on the lawn in the dark. He breaks in a window to get candles and the police arrest him for burglary. When he gets back home, June is in the house in bed and Terry joins her. Note: This episode is also known as The Campers and The (Un)Happy Campers.
24	"The Cowering Inferno"	John B. Hobbs	John Kane	26 January 1982
The Medfords are away at a company conference hosted by Terry's chairman Sir Dennis Hodge. Things start badly when the only parking space is on the top floor of the car park; then the lift is out of order, so they have to carry their luggage down several flights of stairs. Once in their hotel room Terry receives a phone call from Sir Dennis telling him that he is late for the first meeting. In his haste Terry pours June's perfume on his hair instead of hair tonic. Once he arrives at the meeting, Terry is informed that he is making the opening speech as Malcolm cannot attend the conference. Sir Dennis says he will take June to the dinner-dance giving Terry time to learn the speech. June doesn't get back till after one in the morning and Terry is still awake. They receive several interruptions during the night and not realizing that it is nearly time to get up Terry decides to take a couple of sleeping pills. At nine o'clock Terry is still so drowsy that June goes on to make the speech, which pleases Sir Dennis who has just started a new family initiative to get the wives of company employees involved in the business.
25	"The Auction"	John B. Hobbs	Dave and Greg Freeman	2 February 1982
The Medfords receive a visit from their Vicar, who asks them if they can donate some antiques for the church auction. He also wants their help to persuade their neighbour and former auctioneer Tarquin Spry to help. Terry tells the vicar that Tarquin is much too busy and volunteers to be the auctioneer. Tarquin later finds out what Terry said and asks him to step aside. Terry refuses so Tarquin reminds him that he has no experience of acting as an auctioneer and will make a mess of it. At the auction things go wrong and Tarquin is in attendance looking smug, so Terry tries to irritate him by rejecting his set of restored china dogs. During the ensuing argument Terry turns his back and Tarquin places one of the dogs on the lectern. Unaware Terry turns round and bangs his hammer on the lectern to restore order and in the process destroys the china dog.
26	"Something To Get Alarmed About"	John B. Hobbs	Terry Ravenscroft	9 February 1982
The Medfords wake in the night to hear burglars downstairs. Terry kits himself out with a cricket bat and goes to tackle them but they run off when they hear him. June is worried and says they should get a burglar alarm. Terry agrees until he discovers how much they cost. He says all they need is a recording of a dog barking, but finds this much more difficult to achieve than he imagined. Eventually, June recommends recording a jingle of a dog barking from Tony Blackburn's Radio 1 show. Next Terry sets to work making a pressure pad to play the recording when someone steps on the mat inside their front door. He asks June to enter through the front door, banging his head in the process, but it does not work. Many blows to the head later, his alarm system is working perfectly, but it attracts all the dogs from the neighbourhood into their house causing Terry to realize that a traditional burglar alarm would be easier.

=== Series 5 (1982) ===
No.	Title	Directed by	Written by	Original release date
27	"No Councillor"	Peter Whitmore	Terry Ravenscroft	19 October 1982
Sir Dennis Hodge wants Terry to run for councillor of Purley East as he wants a man on the inside so that his firm can sell more fire extinguishers to the council. Terry says he does not want to get involved in anything illegal to which Sir Dennis replies that if he does not his job will be moved to Iceland. Reluctantly, Terry agrees and Sir Dennis organizes a meeting with his campaign manager who turns out to be his next door neighbour Tarquin Spry. They suffer a string of campaign disasters making the election too close to call. Terry ends up losing by one vote to the Socialist candidate. When Sir Dennis says that they will have to discuss Terry's move to Iceland Terry introduces the newly elected socialist councillor as their new area salesman.
28	"Swingtime"	Peter Whitmore	John Kane	26 October 1982
Golf fever has gripped the Medford household as Sir Dennis Hodge has arranged a golfing weekend. June is taking lessons and Terry buys a new set of clubs from a bargain warehouse that June has told him to avoid. Once they arrive Terry spends most of the weekend hiding in their room because Malcolm has told Sir Dennis that Terry has won golfing trophies in the past, well knowing that they were only for crazy golf. On the last day of their stay Terry gets roped into a foursome with Sir Dennis, Malcolm and Colonel Culpepper (Ballard Berkeley). Terry does not know what to do as Sir Dennis expects the "champion in our midst" to win easily. On the course Colonel Culpepper's hearing-aid whistles constantly, which puts Sir Dennis in a bad mood, while Terry's cheap golfing equipment gradually falls to pieces. By the eighth hole Colonel Culpepper is too drunk to continue playing and Terry has run out of clubs so they both go back to the clubhouse. Later, when Sir Dennis gets back to the clubhouse he asks his secretary Miss Fennel to get rid of his golfing equipment as June and Beattie had joined them and won every hole on the back nine.
29	"Noise Abatement"	Peter Whitmore	Dave and Greg Freeman	2 November 1982
Terry has taken up woodwork as a hobby and goes to look at a wood-turning lathe that his nephew Alan has seen for sale. When they arrive June sees that the owner has a bandage on his hand and tries unsuccessfully to talk Terry out of buying it. To make space for the new equipment, Terry asks Alan to remove the junk from their garage, but his van breaks down and he has to empty the contents including a piano on to the Medford's front drive. Terry and June are frequently disturbed by people playing the piano as they walk past. Meanwhile, someone in the neighbourhood has taken to playing their drum-kit during the night causing Tarquin Spry, the new neighbourhood noise abatement chairman, to investigate. Later on, when the Medfords are going to bed they hear loud music from outside. Assuming it is someone playing their piano Terry goes outside to stop them but discovers that the noise is coming from Tarquin's house. Note: This was the first episode to be filmed for Series 5 and originally intended to be the first to air, but shuffled into third place for reasons unknown.
30	"Eyeball, Eyeball"	Peter Whitmore	Terry Ravenscroft	9 November 1982
Terry buys two CB radios for use at home and in his car so that he can talk to June when he is coming home from work. She isn't impressed as he took the money out of their Paris holiday fund. When trying them out the next day Terry takes his eyes off the road and drives his car up the back of a removal van knocking himself out in the process. He comes round to find himself trapped and contacts June on the CB radio for help. The police find him 24 hours later but June doesn't let him out until he agrees to sell the CB radios and take her to Paris. Note: This episode is sometimes known as 'Breaker, Breaker...'.
31	"Playing Pool"	Peter Whitmore	John Kane	16 November 1982
Terry comes in from the garden in a bad mood because the neighbourhood cats keep using their sandpit. Terry spots an advert for a £12 pond at a new garden centre and suggests that they get one to impress Malcolm and Beattie who are coming to dinner the next night. At the garden centre Terry breaks quite a few items which doesn't please the assistant (Bernard Bresslaw). June is annoyed that a £12 pond has in fact cost them £87.50, and as Terry reminds her, an additional 50 pence for the goldfish. After many back-breaking hours Terry has finally finished the pool and comes in to be greeted by the news that Malcolm and Beattie have cancelled their dinner date.
32	"Bingo"	Peter Whitmore	John Kane	23 November 1982
Tarquin and Melinda Spry ask Terry and June to take their place at the church hall old folks group where they are due to give a talk because they believe that the lady in charge of the bingo is fixing the result. Terry and June agree to help the group and along with the vicar they begin surveillance on the bingo lady only to discover that she is fixing the draw as a way of helping the old people who are impoverished yet won't accept charity.

=== Christmas Special (1982) ===
No.	Title	Directed by	Written by	Original release date
33	"Christmas With Terry And June"	Peter Whitmore	John Kane	24 December 1982
Sir Dennis Hodge wrongly assumes Terry has invited him to Christmas lunch. Things escalate when Miss Fennel and Malcolm and Beattie also invite themselves. It ends up with Terry and June having a full house on Christmas Day.

=== Series 6 (1983) ===
No.	Title	Directed by	Written by	Original release date
34	"Strictly Off The Record"	Peter Whitmore	John Kane	15 February 1983
Terry decides to rent a video recorder so he can watch the late night films the next day. Sir Dennis receives a phone call reminding him about a reunion he promised to attend. He is annoyed when he discovers that it will cause him to miss the final of a television bridge series that he has been following for several weeks. Terry offers to record the programme on his new machine. Sir Dennis is delighted and says he'll come round to watch the recording after his reunion. When Terry returns home he finds that June has cancelled the free trial and sent the video recorder back to the rental shop. Terry persuades Malcolm to record the programme and bring his recorder round for Sir Dennis to watch it, but unfortunately Beattie has mixed up the tapes leaving them with a recording of The Sound of Music. Shortly before Sir Dennis is due to arrive, the video rental man delivers a copy of the bridge programme which June had asked him to record. Moments later Sir Dennis telephones to say that he left the reunion early and watched the show live at his club. June says at least they will be able to go to bed but Terry announces that when he told Sir Dennis they had a copy of The Sound of Music he said that he would come round and watch that instead.
35	"Wine, Women and Song"	Peter Whitmore	John Kane	22 February 1983
Terry has started making his own wine to save money. Sir Dennis finds out and appoints him as a judge in a local wine making competition. Terry doesn't bother to spit out the wine after tasting it and quickly becomes inebriated. While Terry is under the influence June gets him to agree to a trip to Boulogne on the ferry to get some proper wine, using two tickets given to them by Malcolm and Beattie. June boards the ferry in time but Terry struggles to find a place to park the car and misses the boat.
36	"A Day In Boulogne"	Peter Whitmore	John Kane	1 March 1983
Terry finally makes it to Boulogne with June but soon encounters language difficulties with the locals. They stock up with wine and fine foods at the hypermarket including a particularly pungent cheese, which Terry is sure will keep the Customs men away at Dover. Back on the boat the smelly cheese clears the ferry's passenger lounge, but at Dover Terry encounters a Customs man with a head cold who is determined to examine his luggage. Rather than pay the duty on the half litre of wine by which he is over his limit Terry instead drinks it, becoming tipsy. Outside in the car park Terry heads for his car and a policeman asks him to take a breathalyser but luckily June is already in the driver's seat. On leaving the port, where they have parked illegally, Terry presents the now stinking cheese to a delighted parking attendant as a gift. On smelling the cheese the attendant angrily throws it into a bin as Terry and June drive away.
37	"Strictly For The Birds"	Peter Whitmore	Terry Ravenscroft	8 March 1983
When Tarquin and Melinda Spry invite Terry and June to go bird watching with them Terry can't really see the point, but decides to have some fun at their expense. Sneaking out of the hide he imitates the mating call of a bittern. Determined to get a photo of the bird Tarquin floats off on an improvised raft and falls into the lake. Later June and Melinda fall out over Terry while Terry and Tarquin, having made up, look on amused.
38	"Tea And No Sympathy"	Peter Whitmore	Terry Ravenscroft	15 March 1983
Terry and June experience problems with industrial relations when they arrange to have new wardrobes fitted in their bedroom – except the workmen who come to fit them go on strike.
39	"Thanks For The Memory"	Peter Whitmore	Jon Watkins	22 March 1983
While on a train journey Terry manages to knock himself unconscious while helping the attractive divorcee Elizabeth Thatcher (Sabina Franklyn) retrieve her luggage and ends up in a police station when he loses his memory. June gets a call from the police sergeant (Colin Jeavons) and collects Terry, who doesn't remember her. Enjoying the fuss being made of him, when his memory does return Terry pretends he still has amnesia until June overhears him.

=== Series 7 (1983) ===
No.	Title	Directed by	Written by	Original release date
40	"Photo Finish"	Peter Whitmore	John Kane	31 October 1983
Terry can't resist a bargain second-hand camera which re-kindles his interest in photography, while June is tempted by a new dress to wear to dinner at Sir Dennis’s house. When Terry tries to take a "warm and friendly" photograph of Sir Dennis it is up to June to get him out of a difficult situation.
41	"One Little Pig"	Peter Whitmore	Terry Ravenscroft	7 November 1983
When June discovers that the valuable diamond in her engagement ring is missing during a baking session Terry goes on a treasure hunt to find it and comes up against inedible rock cakes, a reluctant pig eating a vindaloo curry, disbelieving policemen and a blocked u-bend.
42	"The Raft Race"	Peter Whitmore	Terry Ravenscroft	14 November 1983
Terry takes June with him on a business trip to Ross-on-Wye, where he finds himself involved in a raft race after boasting of his achievements in the Royal Navy. With his job under threat if he loses, Terry resorts to cheating by hiding an outboard motor behind his raft. When this breaks down he paddles slowly to the finish line, but the resulting positive publicity he receives in the local press means that even though he has lost the race he keeps his job.
43	"Too Many Cooks"	Peter Whitmore	John Kane	21 November 1983
Terry and June are hosting a barbecue, but as usual Terry goes berserk, first setting the canopy on fire and later the fence. Malcolm and Beattie having misread the invitation arrive dressed as Red Indians which Terry thinks is hilarious, but the smile is soon wiped off his face when the rain starts and nobody will eat his hamburgers.
44	"Pardon My Dust"	Peter Whitmore	John Kane	5 December 1983
Terry receives a letter informing him that his great uncle Charlie has died. He and June decide to go to the funeral but arrive at the wrong church. When they finally reach the wake they discover that his last wish was to have his ashes scattered in Piccadilly Circus. But when Terry is asked to scatter the ashes of Uncle Charlie he ends up at Bow Street Court while the ashes are tested by the police for drugs.
45	"The Artistic Touch"	Peter Whitmore	John Kane	12 December 1983
Malcolm asks Terry to look after a portrait of the company chairman Sir Dennis Hodge. Unfortunately, when Terry takes the painting home it is damaged by the tradesmen working at his house. After a failed attempt to restore the painting, Terry and June take it round to Malcolm's house. Malcolm is out but his wife Beattie says that there is no need to tell Malcolm and suggests that Terry and June break into the house and steal the portrait. Reluctantly they agree, but during the break in they encounter real burglars who steal the painting.

=== Series 8 (1985) ===
No.	Title	Directed by	Written by	Original release date
46	"Many a Slip"	Martin Shardlow	John Kane	7 September 1985
When Beattie refuses to make tea for the company's cricket match after an argument with Malcolm, Terry volunteers June to take her place. She agrees on the condition that he promises to decorate the spare room for her mother's coming visit. Terry wants to play in the cricket match, but Sir Dennis will not let him as he plays awfully. However, when the last man to bat, Potter (Barry Woolgar), has to leave when his wife goes into labour, Terry takes his place. The ball hits his head and flies into a tree and while the opposition get it down, Terry gets 19 runs and they win the match. Note: As with Series Three and Four, Series Eight was filmed as a 'double-length' series all in one production block, giving the BBC the option to split it in half and air it as two separate series (with the second half potentially being broadcast the following year). Ultimately, unlike Series Three and Four, all of the episodes of Series Eight were shown as one long series, and there were no new episodes the following year.
47	"Unfaithfully Yours"	Martin Shardlow	John Kane	14 September 1985
Miss Fennel has fallen in love with Sir Dennis, and when he takes her to lunch, she believes that he will propose. Instead, he offers to move her to another post in the company. Sir Dennis quickly decides he wants to marry Miss Fennel's replacement, the young Lola Philipott (Julie Dawn Cole). They soon become engaged. June sees Lola in the cinema kissing another man, who turns out to be Sir Dennis's chauffeur (Tony O'Callaghan), while Miss Fennel finds out Lola was married before. To begin with Sir Dennis does not believe them, but soon overhears Lola talking badly of him and ends the engagement.
48	"One Arabian Night"	Martin Shardlow	Colin Bostock-Smith	21 September 1985
Sir Dennis makes Terry and June put up Prince Abdul Aziz (Derek Griffiths) the evening before an important business deal. They try to respect his Arab customs and are surprised when he insists they go to a pub and then drinks alcohol. The Prince takes a liking to June, and Terry jokingly agrees to sell her for 70 camels. Abdul Aziz takes the deal seriously and Terry has to refuse to honour it. The Prince is impressed that Terry has stood up to him rather than fawn over him like Sir Dennis has done, and agrees to sign the contract.
49	"New Doors for Old"	Martin Shardlow	Terry Ravenscroft	28 September 1985
When Tarquin and Melinda get a new front door, June tries to persuade Terry they should get a new one. Two weeks later they go to ‘’Dorien Doors’’ and buy a new door. Terry refuses to pay to have it fitted, so attempts to do so himself. Just before fitting the new door, June gives the old door away to two boys for a bonfire, and when the new door turns out to be too short, they have to go searching for the old door. When the replacement arrives, it is too long, but once again June has given away their old door, so they have to shave off two inches from the new door.
50	"Death of a Salesman"	Robin Nash	John Kane	5 October 1985
With his annual medical coming up, Terry decides to get fit by taking more exercise and vitamin pills. After over-hearing Dr. Fletcher (John Woodnutt) on the telephone, Terry mistakenly believes he has 24 hours to live. He is then rude to Sir Dennis, and leaves work. That evening, when Malcolm and Beattie come round for dinner, Terry gets a call from Dr. Fletcher who tells him his medical was fine. Terry is then worried he has lost his job, but Sir Dennis comes round and says he was impressed with how Terry spoke to him, and thinking Terry was leaving for a rival company, offers him a pay rise.
51	"A Question of Property"	Robin Nash	John Kane	12 October 1985
Terry finds a homeless man, Owen Midgely (Edward Phillips), in his garden shed. June feels guilty about making him leave, and when she and Terry return from Church they find him mowing their lawn, they find it more difficult still to ask him to leave. Owen later decides to leave, but Terry and June discover he has stolen a valuable clock. Midgely later returns the clock, having fixed it and it is now worth £3000; the exact amount Terry and June had just lost when a holiday company they had invested in, at the suggestion of Malcolm and Beattie, went bust.
52	"Terry in Court"	Martin Shardlow	Eric Merriman and John Chapman	19 October 1985
Terry's car is damaged when a council rubbish van backs into it while June is in it; however, the Council claim that she backed into them and will not pay out. Terry decides to take Purley Council to court and after seeing his solicitor Mr. Smith (John Horsley), decides to represent himself. The Judge (John Barron) takes a dim view of Terry representing himself, as does the defence barrister Mr. Robinson (Robert East). Miss Dingle, who witnessed the incident, falls apart in Court and cannot seem to remember what happened. Mr. Grubb (John Bardon), the council driver, also appears as a witness and admits that Terry's car was stationary and Terry wins damages of £250, much to his delight. This episode is a remake of a Happy Ever After episode, with Miss Dingle taking the lines of Aunt Lucy.
53	"The Sporting Life"	Martin Shardlow	John Kane	26 October 1985
The Vicar and Miss Dingle approach Terry about raising money to help the Church start a Youth Club, so he and June have a sale from their front garden. Terry later builds a table tennis table, for use in the youth club and is keen to use it for the weekend until they give to the Church. He tricks Malcolm and Beattie into coming round and play by telling them it is a full size tennis court. However, they agree to play and Malcolm and Terry cannot stop playing as they become ever more competitive. After playing for several hours, Terry wins and to celebrate jumps over the net, wrecking the table.
54	"The Dish"	Martin Shardlow	Greg Freeman	2 November 1985
Sir Dennis is keen to capture the European market and lunches with Swiss businessman Mr. Henri. Malcolm and Terry then both lie and impress Sir Dennis by telling him that they regularly watch European TV via their satellite dishes. However, when Sir Dennis then says Mr. Henri wants to watch a "special programme" using the dish that evening, Malcolm gets out of it leaving Terry to get a dish for the night via Mr. Browne (Clive Panto), who had been fixing their guttering. After considerable problems getting the dish to work, Terry and June discover that the "special programme" is Dallas.
55	"Ill Met By Moonlight"	Martin Shardlow	Colin Bostock-Smith	9 November 1985
June is concerned about the health of Jack (John Rapley), an old friend who is the landlord of their local pub The Feathers, and when his doctor tells him and his wife to take a holiday, Terry and June offer to run the pub in their absence, despite Malcolm reminding Terry that Sir Dennis forbids his employees having second jobs. On their first evening, a colleague of Terry’s, Gower (Daniel Hill), deliberately takes Sir Dennis to the pub, to get back at Terry who accidentally revealed that Gower was also a taxi driver. Despite trying to fool Sir Dennis, Terry and June are discovered. After explaining, Sir Dennis forgives Terry as long as he can try his hand behind the bar.
56	"Mistaken Identikit"	Martin Shardlow	Eric Merriman and John Chapman	16 November 1985
June and Beattie, who is staying with the Medfords’ while Malcolm is away, see a report on a Surrey handbag thief nicknamed the "Granny Grabber" on the TV news. The police drawing of the criminal looks exactly like Terry, and people soon start thinking it is him, including neighbour Mrs. Robins (Josephine Tewson). Next morning, the drawing is on the front of many national newspapers and Terry insists on going to the Police Station to tell them it is not him. That evening, he and June are due to go to a business reception and Terry wears a fake beard and glasses to avoid been mistaken for the criminal. The reception goes well, but on the way home Terry is stopped by the Police for not having his lights on. When doing a breathalyser test, Terry’s fake moustache flies off and Terry is taken to the Police Station as they think he is the Granny Grabber. He is only released when the real culprit is caught red-handed. This episode is another remake of an episode of Happy Ever After, with Beattie taking the lines of Aunt Lucy.
57	"Lover, Come Back to Me"	Martin Shardlow	John Kane	23 November 1985
June gets a letter from Nigel Coalfax, whom she dated for a year and half in her teens until he emigrated to Australia, and who is in the UK on business. When Terry cancels his and June’s skiing holiday due to work commitments, she decides to have dinner with Nigel at his hotel and makes Terry jealous. The following day he finds a letter from June to Nigel saying her current life is a "sham" and telling of her love for him, not knowing that the letter was written years before. That evening, a drunken Terry and Sir Dennis interrupt a Poetry Circle at Terry’s house, with the Vicar, Beattie and Miss Dingle present. Sir Dennis insists Terry take June on the holiday and they soon make up when he realises his mistake.
N–A	"Computer Games"	Martin Shardlow	Terry Ravenscroft	30 November 1985
Terry buys a home computer so he can submit work reports from the luxury of his own home, and to try and impress Sir Dennis, who has been bemoaning his workers aren't embracing the budding computer age. Terry insists to June he won't just use it "to play silly computer games", but every time her back's turned he's playing "Space Jewel Chomper", a Pac-Man-like game, much to her annoyance. But when Terry attempts to connect to the work interface, his very amateur computer skills inadvertently begin playing havoc with local lighting and security systems - including locking June in the garage when it closes the automatic door behind her, leaving her angry at him. Late that night, Terry is using the computer when it alerts him to someone deactivating the security alarm at work; he uses the computer to trap the intruder in a style similar to playing the Space Jewel Chomper game, locking the doors in sequence and eventually trapping the intruder in Sir Dennis's office, impressing June with his resourcefulness. Unable to get the police to respond (who are busy dealing with false security alarms all over town thanks to Terry's computer), they race to the office themselves to apprehend the intruder - only to find it is Sir Dennis himself, who has been sneaking in at night to play Space Jewel Chomper on the office computer. At first Sir Dennis is furious for being trapped in, until June impresses him about Terry's computer skills protecting the company's security, and Sir Dennis congratulates him. However his mood turns back to anger when they find Terry's computer has left them locked them in the office and they're trapped until staff arrive in the morning to unlock - but cheers up again at Terry's suggestion they pass the hours by playing Space Jewel Chomper, much to June's chagrin. Note: A script for this episode exists and was scheduled to be filmed last in the Series Eight filming block, but didn't enter production. However, some sources that use the episode listing taken from the original 1985 press release, still list it, suggesting that it was dropped from filming late in the production of Series Eight, and contributing to Series Eight's unusual episode count (details on Series Eight's unusual episode count can be found at the top of this article).

=== Christmas Special (1985) ===
No.	Title	Directed by	Written by	Original release date
58	"Pantomania"	Martin Shardlow	John Kane	24 December 1985
Sir Dennis decides to organise the company's pantomime, Jack and the Beanstalk, this Christmas, and gets rid of any vulgar or rude humour from it. Terry turns down a role, as he assumes the Vicar will ask him to play Father Christmas, but Austin has actually already asked Tarquin. Terry then decides to take part in the company's pantomime after all, and he and June play the cow, while Sir Dennis plays the dame. Terry and June are in costume, when the fire alarm goes off and in the confusion they get into a lorry and end up in Wembley. They manage to get back to Purley just in time to go on stage, but unbeknown to them Malcolm and Beattie are already on stage as the cow.

=== Series 9 (1987) ===
No.	Title	Directed by	Written by	Original release date
59	"Age Before Beauty"	Robin Nash	John Kane	20 July 1987
After Terry gets helped across the road by two boy scouts (Ben Davis and Spencer Groves) and then Miss Dunwiddy, he is concerned that he looks old and so decides to start a new fitness regime and buys a rowing machine. After discovering him working out at work, Sir Dennis advises that he buys a corset similar to the ones he wears, although Terry has problems getting into it. June tries to make him stop the fitness regime, but he does not listen. However, he comes home one day to find she has dressed as a punk as a way to look younger herself, and he promises her he will stop.
60	"The Mole"	Martin Shardlow	John Kane	27 July 1987
Terry's boss Sir Dennis is not amused when Terry is put under suspicion by Head of Security Major Fawcett (John Ringham) for industrial espionage when the blueprints for a new talking fire extinguisher, Titan 2000, go missing; to add to Terry's problems Malcolm is carrying on with his secretary Miss Partridge (Christine Garner) while Terry's nephew Alan is hounded by bailiffs. When June finds the blueprints planted in Terry's office by 'the Mole' they realise the 'spy' is Miss Partridge.
61	"They Also Serve"	Martin Shardlow	John Kane	3 August 1987
June and Beattie team up as caterers, but when Beattie backs out of the venture, June is left to cope single-handed when Sir Dennis gets her to cook for an important business dinner. However, when the butler turns up drunk Terry is forced to take his place.
62	"The Eye of the Householder"	Martin Shardlow	John Kane	10 August 1987
After Miss Dunwiddy disturbs a burglar in her house Terry is persuaded by a police Inspector to become the co-ordinator of the local Neighbourhood Watch scheme. Terry calls a meeting of the local residents, but all is not as straightforward as it seems as the police-inspector does not exist and 90% of those attending the meeting have their homes burgled – but not the Medfords, who fall under the suspicion of the real police.
63	"Bats In The Belfry"	Martin Shardlow	John Kane	17 August 1987
After June has a dream that she is a fairytale figure trapped in a tower where she is rescued by two knights in shining armour and threatened by a fire-breathing dragon, she and Terry find themselves trapped in the church's belfry where no one can hear their calls for help. When they are rescued by two policemen and June's mother calls them on the 'phone the couple realise her dream has come true.
64	"Of Human Bondage"	Martin Shardlow	John Kane	24 August 1987
Terry's day gets off to a bad start when he receives a pile of bills, but he soon finds himself the centre of attention when he wins £250,000 on a Premium Bond left to him by his late Uncle Charlie. Sir Dennis suggests he invests the money in the company in return for a seat on the Board, but the Medfords are left with just £5 when they discover the winning bond is no longer valid.
65	"The Family Way"	Martin Shardlow	John Kane	31 August 1987
Terry spends £17 at the church fête trying to win a goldfish, and spends another £25 on a bigger tank and accessories including a plastic shipwreck, while June pressurises him to get a cleaning lady, Mrs Bunce (Zara Nutley). Meanwhile, at work Terry is involved in launching the company's new 'First Steps in Home Safety' campaign which involves finding a photograph of a suitable baby to put on the ads. Malcolm tries to drop Terry in it when he passes a baby photo to Terry without telling him it is photograph of a young Sir Dennis. When Terry says the baby in the photo looks like Winston Churchill Sir Dennis is flattered. The Medfords’ daughter Wendy turns up thinking she may be pregnant, and is worried how her husband Roger will take the news; Mrs Bunce, with her ear to the door, mishears the conversation and tells Beattie that June is pregnant. Beattie rings Malcolm at work to tell him the news and a confused conversation follows in which Malcolm, Miss Fennel and Sir Dennis are talking about June being pregnant while Terry thinks they are talking about his pregnant fish.
