= 1913–14 Brentford F.C. season =

English football team season

Brentford
1913–14 season
- Chairman: H. Jason-Saunders
- Manager: Dusty Rhodes
- Stadium: Griffin Park
- Southern League Second Division: 3rd
- FA Cup: Fifth qualifying round
- Top goalscorer: League: Simons (19); All: Simons (19)
- Highest home attendance: 13,000
- Lowest home attendance: 2,000
Home colours

During the 1913–14 English football season, Brentford competed in the Southern League Second Division. Despite winning 13 of 15 matches in the first half of the season, a loss of form in a five-week spell from February through to April 1914 ended the club's chances of an immediate return to First Division.

== Season summary ==
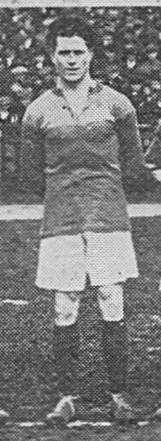
Future England international forward Jack Cock briefly played for Brentford towards the end of the season.

Brentford player-manager Dusty Rhodes faced a tough task ahead in the Bees' first season back in the Southern League Second Division since 1900–01, with the club's debt having risen to £5,000 (equivalent to £621,500 in 2023) and the prospect of high expenses and reduced gate receipts from away matches due to 11 of the league's 16 clubs being located in Wales. As a result, the Southern League Management Committee paid a £100 subsidy to each of the five English clubs in the league. Of the previous season's professional players, only goalkeeper Ted Price, full backs Tommy Fells and Walter Spratt, centre half Frank Bentley and outside left Patsy Hendren were retained. Bill Smith, Frederick Chapple and Bob McTavish were sold for small fees, while left half Phil Richards elected to retire. In came half backs Tom McGovern, Bobby Jackson and forwards Charlie Elliott, Henry Simons, Joe Johnson and Tommy Clark. England international amateur right half Alec Barclay remained with the club and amateur forwards Henry White and Jack Chapman were added to the ranks.

As the season got underway, Brentford feasted on poor Welsh opposition, winning 13 of the first 15 matches of the season, scoring 49 goals and conceding just three. Treharris and Ton Pentre were each beaten 7–0 at Griffin Park and the Bees also posted 5–0, 4–0 and 3–0 scorelines, each on two occasions. The rot slowly set in after a 1–0 home defeat to 2nd-place Croydon Common on Christmas Day 1913 and injuries and the absence of some of the club's amateurs lead to defeats to fellow challengers Luton Town in February 1914, Stoke later that month and a galling 1–0 reverse to Ton Pentre on 21 March. Defeat to Newport County at home on 4 April ended Brentford's mathematical chances of a runners-up finish and later that month, with the club unable to pay its players in full, leading scorer Henry Simons and future England international Jack Cock were sold to raise funds. Brentford finished the campaign in 4th-place and lost £127 for the season (equivalent to £15,400 in 2023).

== League table ==
Pos	Team	Pld	W	D	L	GF	GA	GR	Pts	Promotion
1	Croydon Common	30	23	5	2	76	14	5.429	51	Promoted to Division One
2	Luton Town	30	24	3	3	92	22	4.182	51	Promoted to Division One
3	Brentford	30	20	4	6	80	18	4.444	44	
4	Swansea Town	30	20	4	6	66	25	2.640	44	
5	Stoke	30	19	2	9	71	34	2.088	40	

Source: rsssf.com
Rules for classification: The system of using goal average to separate two teams tied on points was used until the 1976-77 season. The points system: 2 points for a win, 1 point for a draw and 0 points for losing.

== Results ==
Brentford's goal tally listed first.

=== Legend ===
Win	Draw	Loss

=== Southern League Second Division ===
No.	Date	Opponent	Venue	Result	Scorer(s)
1	13 September 1913	Treharris	A	3–1	Chapman, McGovern, Simons
2	20 September 1913	Caerphilly	H	5–0	Simons (2), Johnson, Hendren (2)
3	4 October 1913	Ton Pentre	H	7–0	Chapman (3), Hendren, Clark, Johnson, Jackson
4	11 October 1913	Abertillery	A	1–0	Clark
5	18 October 1913	Swansea Town	H	3–1	Clark, Johnson, Barclay
6	25 October 1913	Barry	H	5–0	Johnson (3), Simons (2)
7	7 November 1913	Mardy	H	4–0	Simons, Johnson (3)
8	6 December 1913	Llanelly	A	3–0	Chapman (2), Jackson
9	20 December 1913	Barry	A	4–0	Kent, Simons, Chapman, Elliott
10	25 December 1913	Croydon Common	H	0–1	
11	26 December 1913	Treharris	H	7–0	Simons (4), Chapman (2), Johnson
12	27 December 1913	Newport County	H	3–0	Simons (2), Chapman
13	17 January 1914	Stoke	H	2–0	Chapman (2)
14	29 January 1914	Mid Rhondda	A	0–0	
15	31 January 1914	Pontypridd	H	2–0	Simons, Johnson
16	7 February 1914	Luton Town	A	1–3	Hendren (pen)
17	14 February 1914	Llanelly	H	2–0	Chapman (2)
18	21 February 1914	Pontypridd	A	0–0	
19	23 February 1914	Mardy	A	2–0	Johnson, Simons
20	28 February 1914	Stoke	A	1–2	Simons
21	14 March 1914	Mid Rhondda	H	3–1	Farnfield, Simons, Barclay
22	21 March 1914	Ton Pentre	A	0–1	
23	23 March 1914	Aberdare	A	6–3	Johnson (3), Simons, Hendren, Elliott
24	28 March 1914	Abertillery	H	5–0	McGovern, Chapman (2), Barclay, Cock
25	4 April 1914	Newport County	A	2–3	Jackson, Simons
26	10 April 1914	Aberdare	H	4–0	Sloley (3), Chapman
27	11 April 1914	Luton Town	H	0–0	
28	13 April 1914	Croydon Common	A	0–1	
29	18 April 1914	Swansea Town	A	0–0	
30	20 April 1914	Caerphilly	A	5–1	Meehan, White (2), Johnson, Kent

=== FA Cup ===
Round	Date	Opponent	Venue	Result	Scorer
QR4	29 November 1913	Luton Clarence	H	1–0	Johnson
QR5	13 December 1913	Southend United	H	1–1	Chapman
QR5 (replay)	17 December 1913	Southend United	A	0–2	

- Source: 100 Years Of Brentford

== Playing squad ==
Players' ages are as of the opening day of the 1913–14 season.

Pos.	Name	Nat.	Date of birth (age)	Signed from	Signed in	Notes
Goalkeepers
GK	Ted Price	(England)	13 June 1883 (aged 30)	Croydon Common	1912	
Defenders
DF	Tommy Fells	(England)	8 January 1890 (aged 22)	South Kirkby	1913	
DF	Dusty Rhodes (c)	(England)	16 August 1882 (aged 31)	Sunderland	1908	
DF	Walter Spratt	(England)	14 April 1889 (aged 24)	Rotherham Town	1911	
Midfielders
HB	Alec Barclay	(England)	1 November 1885 (aged 27)	Ilford	1910	Amateur
HB	Frank Bentley	(England)	9 October 1886 (aged 26)	Tottenham Hotspur	1912	
HB	Bobby Jackson	(England)	9 February 1887 (aged 26)	Portsmouth	1913	
HB	Tom McGovern	(Ireland)	11 November 1888 (aged 24)	Halifax Town	1913	
Forwards
FW	Billy Brawn	(England)	1 August 1878 (aged 35)	Chelsea	1911	
FW	Jack Chapman	(England)	29 April 1895 (aged 18)	Southall	1913	Amateur
FW	Tommy Clark	(England)	n/a	Middlesbrough	1913	
FW	Charlie Elliott	(England)	28 September 1886 (aged 26)	Millwall	1913	
FW	Herbert Farnfield	(England)	5 August 1883 (aged 30)	New Crusaders	1914	Amateur
FW	Patsy Hendren	(England)	5 February 1889 (aged 24)	Coventry City	1911	Played when his cricket commitments allowed
FW	Joe Johnson	(England)	12 December 1882 (aged 30)	Clapton Orient	1913	
FW	Tommy Kent	(England)	10 September 1888 (aged 25)	Slough Town	1913	Amateur
FW	John Meehan	(England)	1896 (aged 16–17)	Newton	1914	
FW	Richard Sloley	(England)	20 August 1891 (aged 22)	Cambridge University	1914	Amateur
FW	Henry White	(England)	8 August 1895 (aged 18)	Whamcliffe Athletic	1914	Amateur
Players who left the club mid-season
FW	Jack Cock	(England)	14 November 1893 (aged 19)	Old Kingstonians	1914	Transferred to Huddersfield Town
FW	Henry Simons	(England)	26 November 1887 (aged 25)	Merthyr Town	1913	Transferred to Fulham

- Sources: 100 Years Of Brentford, Football League Players' Records 1888 to 1939

== Coaching staff ==
Name	Role
(England) Dusty Rhodes	Manager
(England) Fred Halliday	Secretary
(England) Tom Cowper	Trainer

== Statistics ==
=== Appearances and goals ===

Brentford's highest appearance-makers in each position during the Southern League season.

Pos	Nat	Name	League		FA Cup		Total	
Pos	Nat	Name	Apps	Goals	Apps	Goals	Apps	Goals
GK	(England)	Ted Price	30	0	3	0	33	0
DF	(England)	Tommy Fells	7	0	0	0	7	0
DF	(England)	Dusty Rhodes	23	0	3	0	26	0
DF	(England)	Walter Spratt	30	0	3	0	33	0
HB	(England)	Alec Barclay	17	3	3	0	20	3
HB	(England)	Frank Bentley	28	0	3	0	31	0
HB	(England)	Bobby Jackson	24	3	3	0	27	3
HB	(Ireland)	Tom McGovern	20	2	0	0	20	2
FW	(England)	Billy Brawn	1	0	—		1	0
FW	(England)	Jack Chapman	25	16	3	1	28	17
FW	(England)	Tommy Clark	4	3	0	0	4	3
FW	(England)	Jack Cock	3	1	—		3	1
FW	(England)	Charlie Elliott	17	2	3	0	20	2
FW	(England)	Herbert Farnfield	1	1	0	0	1	1
FW	(England)	Patsy Hendren	28	5	3	0	31	5
FW	(England)	Joe Johnson	28	15	3	1	31	16
FW	(England)	Tommy Kent	14	2	—		14	2
FW	(England)	John Meehan	1	1	—		1	1
FW	(England)	Henry Simons	25	19	3	0	28	19
FW	(England)	Richard Sloley	2	3	—		2	3
FW	(England)	Henry White	2	2	0	0	2	2

- Players listed in italics left the club mid-season.
- Source: 100 Years Of Brentford

=== Goalscorers ===
Pos.	Nat	Player	SL2	FAC	Total
FW	(England)	Henry Simons	19	0	19
FW	(England)	Jack Chapman	16	1	17
FW	(England)	Joe Johnson	15	1	16
FW	(England)	Patsy Hendren	5	0	5
HB	(England)	Alec Barclay	3	0	3
FW	(England)	Tommy Clark	3	0	3
HB	(England)	Bobby Jackson	3	0	3
FW	(England)	Richard Sloley	3	0	3
FW	(England)	Tommy Kent	2	—	2
FW	(England)	Charlie Elliott	2	0	2
HB	(Ireland)	Tom McGovern	2	0	2
FW	(England)	Henry White	2	0	2
FW	(England)	Jack Cock	1	—	1
FW	(England)	John Meehan	1	—	1
FW	(England)	Herbert Farnfield	1	0	1
Total			80	2	82

- Players listed in italics left the club mid-season.
- Source: 100 Years Of Brentford

=== Amateur international caps ===
Pos.	Nat	Player	Caps	Goals	Ref
HB	(England)	Alec Barclay	2	0	

=== Management ===
Name	Nat	From	To	Record All Comps					Record League				
Name	Nat	From	To	P	W	D	L	W %	P	W	D	L	W %
Dusty Rhodes	(England)	13 September 1913	20 April 1914	33	21	5	7	63.64|	30	20	4	6	66.67

=== Summary ===
Games played	33 (30 Southern League Second Division, 3 FA Cup)
Games won	21 (20 Southern League Second Division, 1 FA Cup)
Games drawn	5 (4 Southern League Second Division, 1 FA Cup)
Games lost	7 (6 Southern League Second Division, 1 FA Cup)
Goals scored	82 (80 Southern League Second Division, 2 FA Cup)
Goals conceded	21 (18 Southern League Second Division, 3 FA Cup)
Clean sheets	20 (19 Southern League Second Division, 1 FA Cup)
Biggest league win	7–0 on two occasions
Worst league defeat	3–1 versus Luton Town, 7 February 1914
Most appearances	33, Ted Price, Walter Spratt (30 Southern League Second Division, 3 FA Cup)
Top scorer (league)	19, Henry Simons
Top scorer (all competitions)	19, Henry Simons

== Transfers & loans ==
Players transferred in
Date	Pos.	Name	Previous club	Fee	Ref.
18 June 1913	FW	(England) Joe Johnson	(England) Clapton Orient	n/a	
23 June 1913	HB	(England) Bobby Jackson	(England) Portsmouth	n/a	
23 June 1913	FW	(Scotland) Bob Mitchell	(England) Barnsley	n/a	
31 June 1913	FW	(England) Henry Simons	(Wales) Merthyr Town	n/a	
18 August 1913	FW	(England) Bob Browning	(England) Southampton	n/a	
21 August 1913	FW	(England) Charlie Elliott	(England) Millwall	n/a	
28 August 1913	FW	(England) Tommy Clark	(England) Middlesbrough	n/a	
3 September 1913	HB	(Scotland) James Ramsay	(Wales) Aberdare	n/a	
17 September 1913	HB	(Ireland) Tom McGovern	(England) Halifax Town	n/a	
9 September 1913	GK	(England) Billy Biggar	(England) Rochdale	n/a	
September 1913	HB	(England) Alf Amos	(England) Old Kingstonians	Amateur	
September 1913	FW	(England) George Littler	(England) King's Royal Rifle Corps	Amateur	
27 December 1913	FW	(England) Thomas Graham	(England) Allerton Bywater Colliery	n/a	
December 1913	FW	(England) Tommy Kent	(England) Slough Town	Amateur	
1913	FW	(England) Jack Chapman	(England) Southall	Amateur	
1913	FW	(England) James Holland	(England) Luton Town	n/a	
1913	FW	(England) Alfred Rosier	(England) Southall	n/a	
1913	FB	(England) Bertie Rosier	(England) Southall	n/a	
1913	FW	(England) Henry White	(England) Whamcliffe Athletic	Amateur	
February 1914	FW	(England) Herbert Farnfield	n/a	Amateur	
February 1914	FW	(England) John Meehan	(England) Newton	n/a	
March 1914	FW	(England) Jack Cock	(England) Old Kingstonians	Amateur	
April 1914	FW	(England) Richard Sloley	(England) Cambridge University	Amateur	
Players transferred out
Date	Pos.	Name	Subsequent club	Fee	Ref.
23 July 1913	FW	(Scotland) Bob McTavish	(Scotland) Third Lanark	Nominal	
24 September 1913	FW	(Scotland) Bob Mitchell	(Ireland) Distillery	n/a	
1913	FW	(England) Frederick Chapple	(England) Bristol City	Nominal	
1913	FW	(England) Bill Smith	(England) Southampton	Nominal	
April 1914	FW	(England) Jack Cock	(England) Huddersfield Town	Nominal	
April 1914	FW	(England) Henry Simons	(England) Fulham	n/a	
Players released
Date	Pos.	Name	Subsequent club	Join date	Ref.
July 1913	HB	(England) Phil Richards	Retired		
February 1914	FW	(England) Herbert Farnfield	n/a	n/a	
April 1914	HB	(England) Frank Bentley	Retired		
April 1914	GK	(England) Billy Biggar	(England) Rochdale	24 June 1914	
April 1914	FW	(England) Billy Brawn	Retired		
April 1914	FW	(England) Jack Chapman	(England) Southall	n/a	
April 1914	FW	(England) Tommy Clark	n/a	n/a	
April 1914	FW	(England) Charlie Elliott	(England) Leyton	1 September 1914	
April 1914	FB	(England) Tommy Fells	(England) South Kirkby	13 May 1914	
April 1914	FW	(England) John Meehan	n/a	n/a	
April 1914	FW	(England) Bob Browning	(England) Queens Park Rangers	May 1914	
