= 1914–15 Brentford F.C. season =

English football team season

Brentford
1914–15 season
- Chairman: H. Jason-Saunders
- Manager: Dusty Rhodes
- Stadium: Griffin Park
- Southern League Second Division: 7th
- FA Cup: Fifth qualifying round
- Top goalscorer: League: White (7); All: White (7)
- Highest home attendance: 5,000
- Lowest home attendance: 400
Home colours	Away colours

During the 1914–15 English football season, Brentford competed in the Southern League Second Division. The season began one month after Britain entered the First World War, which unsettled the squad as players left to undertake military or munitions duties. The Bees finished in mid-table in what would be the club's last season of competitive football until 1919–20.

== Season summary ==
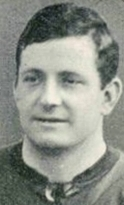
Player-manager Dusty Rhodes stood down at the end of the season to serve in the Royal Army Pay Corps.

Brentford's players were due to report back for pre-season training during the week beginning 3 August 1914, but those preparations were disrupted by Britain's declaration of war on Germany on 4 August. Just two players had been signed, forwards Jack Curtis and Stephen Stonley. As the season got underway, Brentford lost just two of the first 10 Southern League Second Division matches, but by that point it had become obvious that the war would not be over by Christmas as predicted. Beginning in mid-October 1914, the squad was decimated by departures to serve in the army (Kent, Sloley, Hendren, Amos), work in munitions at the Royal Arsenal (McGovern, Johnson, Stonley) or on transfers (J. Curtis, Spratt). Reserves, guest players, free transfers and local amateurs were brought in to plug gaps in the squad, with full back Fred Price, half backs Mick O'Brien, Charles Allwright and forwards Michael Donaghy, Walter Chalk, F. Arnold and Charles Hibbert making up for the departures of the professionals in the second half of the season. Amateur Walter Chalk would become something of a minor success, scoring six goals in 9 appearances.

Notably, a 10–0 win over Abertillery on 28 November 1914 set a new club record, but the result was declared void two days later when Abertillery resigned from the Southern League. Earlier wins over Leyton and Mardy were also chalked off when those clubs also left the league. Brentford won just three of the final 15 matches of the season, with the one bright spot being the emergence of inside right Henry White. Low attendances meant the Bees finished a mid-table season £7,000 in debt (equivalent to £708,500 in 2023) and 1914–15 would become the final season of competitive football until 1919–20, after the war ended in November 1918.

Three former Brentford players died during the season:

- Private Harry Gould, a former reserve team player, died whilst in training with the Royal Fusiliers on 7 September 1914.
- Private William Mehew, an occasional player at the turn of the century, was serving in the Northamptonshire Regiment when he was killed during the Battle of Aubers on 9 May 1915.
- One-time England amateur international George Littler, a former Brentford reserve, was serving as a sergeant in the King's Royal Rifle Corps when he died of wounds suffered during the Battle of Aubers on 11 May 1915.

== League table ==
Pos	Team	Pld	W	D	L	GF	GA	GR	Pts	Promotion or qualification
5	Coventry City	24	13	2	9	56	33	1.697	28	Elected to the 1919–20 Football League Second Division after World War I
6	Ton Pentre	24	11	6	7	42	43	0.977	28	
7	Brentford	24	8	7	9	35	45	0.778	23	Elected to 1919–20 SFL Division One after World War I
8	Llanelly	24	10	1	13	39	32	1.219	21	
9	Barry	24	6	5	13	30	35	0.857	17	

Rules for classification: The system of using goal average to separate two teams tied on points was used up until the 1976–77 season. The points system: 2 points for a win, 1 point for a draw and 0 points for losing.

== Results ==
Brentford's goal tally listed first.

=== Legend ===
Win	Draw	Loss

=== Southern League Second Division ===
No.	Date	Opponent	Venue	Result	Scorer(s)
1	5 September 1914	Coventry City	H	3–1	Sloley, Stonley (2, 1 pen)
2	12 September 1914	Barry	A	1–0	White
3	14 September 1914	Mid Rhondda	A	0–0	
4	26 September 1914	Ton Pentre	A	0–0	
5	13 October 1914	Stalybridge Celtic	A	1–5	J. Curtis
6	31 October 1914	Ebbw Vale	H	3–0	Sloley (3)
7	7 November 1914	Llanelly	A	0–3	
8	14 November 1914	Newport County	H	1–0	Stonley (pen)
9	12 December 1914	Swansea Town	H	2–0	Johnson, Hendren
10	25 December 1914	Stoke	H	2–2	Stonley, Sloley
11	26 December 1914	Stoke	A	0–3	
12	2 January 1915	Coventry City	A	2–3	Stonley, White
13	9 January 1915	Pontypridd	A	0–1	
14	16 January 1915	Barry	H	0–0	
15	30 January 1915	Ton Pentre	H	3–3	Hibbert, White, F. Price
16	13 February 1915	Stalybridge Celtic	H	1–3	Chalk
17	6 March 1915	Ebbw Vale	A	4–1	Arnold (2), White, Chalk
18	13 March 1915	Llanelly	H	2–2	Martin (og), Chalk
19	20 March 1915	Newport County	A	0–5	
20	27 March 1915	Mid Rhondda	H	3–1	White, Chalk (2)
21	2 April 1915	Merthyr Town	H	1–1	O'Brien
22	3 April 1915	Swansea Town	A	0–8	
23	5 April 1915	Merthyr Town	A	0–3	
24	10 April 1915	Pontypridd	H	6–0	O'Brien (2), Chalk, White (2), Barclay

=== FA Cup ===
Round	Date	Opponent	Venue	Result	Scorer
QR4	21 November 1914	Nunhead	A	1–0	Stonley
QR5	5 December 1914	Boscombe	A	0–0	
QR5 (replay)	9 December 1914	Boscombe	H	0–1	

- Source: 100 Years Of Brentford

== Playing squad ==
Players' ages are as of the opening day of the 1914–15 season.

Pos.	Name	Nat.	Date of birth (age)	Signed from	Signed in	Notes
Goalkeepers
GK	Ted Price	(England)	13 June 1883 (aged 31)	Croydon Common	1912	
Defenders
DF	Frank Price	(England)	28 February 1885 (aged 29)	Shepherds Bush	1914	
DF	Dusty Rhodes (c)	(England)	16 August 1882 (aged 32)	Sunderland	1908	Manager
DF	Bertie Rosier	(England)	21 March 1893 (aged 21)	Southall	1913	
Midfielders
HB	Charles Allwright	(England)	11 June 1888 (aged 26)	Kingston upon Thames	1914	
HB	Alf Amos	(England)	9 February 1893 (aged 21)	Old Kingstonians	1913	
HB	Alec Barclay	(England)	1 November 1885 (aged 28)	Ilford	1910	Amateur
HB	Bobby Jackson	(England)	9 February 1887 (aged 27)	Portsmouth	1913	
HB	Tom McGovern	(Ireland)	11 November 1888 (aged 25)	Halifax Town	1913	
HB	Mick O'Brien	(Ireland)	10 August 1893 (aged 21)	Celtic	1915	
Forwards
FW	Herbert Allwright	(England)	4 March 1892 (aged 23)	Unattached	1915	
FW	F. Arnold	(England)	n/a	West Kensington	1915	
FW	Walter Chalk	(England)	10 July 1885 (aged 29)	Old Kingstonians	1915	Amateur
FW	Jack Chapman	(England)	29 April 1895 (aged 19)	Southall	1913	Amateur
FW	George Curtis	(England)	22 October 1888 (aged 25)	Kingston upon Thames	1914	
FW	Michael Donaghy	(England)	26 January 1889 (aged 25)	Luton Town	1915	
FW	Patsy Hendren	(England)	5 February 1889 (aged 25)	Queens Park Rangers	1911	Played when his cricket commitments allowed
FW	Charles Hibbert	(England)	25 January 1894 (aged 20)	Uxbridge	1914	Amateur
FW	Tommy Kent	(England)	10 September 1888 (aged 25)	Slough Town	1913	Amateur
FW	Jack Land	(England)	31 March 1883 (aged 31)	Hounslow	1910	
FW	Richard Sloley	(England)	20 August 1891 (aged 23)	Cambridge University	1914	Amateur
FW	Stephen Stonley	(England)	29 September 1889 (aged 24)	Woolwich Arsenal	1914	
FW	Charles Symes	(England)	13 March 1888 (aged 26)	South Tooting	1912	
FW	Henry White	(England)	8 August 1895 (aged 19)	Whamcliffe Athletic	1913	Amateur
Players who left the club mid-season
DF	Walter Spratt	(England)	14 April 1889 (aged 25)	Rotherham Town	1911	Transferred to Manchester United
HB	Joe Johnson	(England)	12 December 1882 (aged 31)	Clapton Orient	1913	Transferred to Hartlepools United
FW	Jack Curtis	(England)	13 December 1888 (aged 25)	Fulham	1914	Transferred to Stockport County
Guest players
GK	William Hughes	(England)	n/a	Leyton	1915	Amateur, guest from Leyton
HB	Harry Crane	(England)	25 September 1890 (aged 23)	Woking	1915	Amateur, guest from Woking
FW	Charles Bedell	(England)	17 May 1880 (aged 34)	Tufnell Park	1915	Amateur, guest from Tufnell Park
FW	Norman Carson	(England)	20 January 1889 (aged 25)	Shepherd's Bush	1915	Amateur, guest from Shepherd's Bush
FW	Richard Fraser	(England)	n/a	Chelsea	1914	Guest from Chelsea
FW	Percy Matthews	(England)	19 February 1884 (aged 30)	Uxbridge	1914	Amateur, guest from Uxbridge
FW	Cecil Salisbury	(England)	4 September 1886 (aged 28)	Woking	1915	Amateur, guest from Woking
FW	James Sangster	(England)	22 May 1891 (aged 23)	Southall	1914	Amateur, guest from Southall

- Sources: 100 Years of Brentford, Timeless Bees, Football League Players' Records 1888 to 1939, Bees Review

== Coaching staff ==
Name	Role
(England) Dusty Rhodes	Manager
(England) Fred Halliday	Secretary
(England) Tommy Spicer	Trainer
(England) Michael Whitham	Trainer

== Statistics ==
=== Appearances and goals ===

Brentford's highest appearance-makers in each position during the Southern League season.

Pos	Nat	Name	League		FA Cup		Total	
Pos	Nat	Name	Apps	Goals	Apps	Goals	Apps	Goals
GK	(England)	Ted Price	22	0	3	0	25	0
DF	(England)	Frank Price	10	1	—		10	1
DF	(England)	Dusty Rhodes	22	0	2	0	24	0
DF	(England)	Bertie Rosier	1	0	0	0	1	0
DF	(England)	Walter Spratt	15	0	3	0	18	0
HB	(England)	Charles Allwright	5	0	—		5	0
HB	(England)	Alf Amos	23	0	3	0	26	0
HB	(England)	Alec Barclay	12	1	3	0	15	1
HB	(England)	Bobby Jackson	1	0	0	0	1	0
HB	(England)	Joe Johnson	11	1	2	0	13	1
HB	(England)	Jack Land	1	0	0	0	1	0
HB	(Ireland)	Tom McGovern	15	0	3	0	18	0
HB	(Ireland)	Mick O'Brien	9	3	—		9	3
FW	(England)	Herbert Allwright	2	0	—		2	0
FW	(England)	F. Arnold	7	2	—		7	2
FW	(England)	Walter Chalk	9	6	—		9	6
FW	(England)	Jack Chapman	2	0	0	0	2	0
FW	(England)	Jack Curtis	14	1	2	0	16	1
FW	(England)	Michael Donaghy	7	0	—		7	0
FW	(England)	Patsy Hendren	13	1	1	0	14	1
FW	(England)	Charles Hibbert	11	1	—		11	1
FW	(England)	Tommy Kent	4	0	1	0	5	0
FW	(England)	Richard Sloley	3	5	1	0	4	5
FW	(England)	Stephen Stonley	14	4	3	1	17	5
FW	(England)	Charles Symes	1	0	2	0	3	0
FW	(England)	Henry White	16	7	0	0	16	7
Players guested during the season
GK	(England)	William Hughes	2	0	—		2	0
HB	(England)	Harry Crane	1	0	—		1	0
FW	(England)	Charles Bedell	1	0	—		1	0
FW	(England)	Norman Carson	2	0	—		2	0
FW	(England)	George Curtis	1	0	—		1	0
FW	(England)	Richard Fraser	3	0	—		3	0
FW	(England)	Percy Matthews	3	0	—		3	0
FW	(England)	Cecil Salisbury	1	0	—		1	0
FW	(England)	James Sangster	—		2	0	2	0

- Players listed in italics left the club mid-season.
- Source: 100 Years of Brentford

=== Goalscorers ===
Pos.	Nat	Player	SL2	FAC	Total
FW	(England)	Henry White	7	0	7
FW	(England)	Walter Chalk	6	—	6
FW	(England)	Richard Sloley	5	0	5
FW	(England)	Stephen Stonley	4	1	5
HB	(Ireland)	Mick O'Brien	3	—	3
FW	(England)	F. Arnold	2	—	2
FW	(England)	Charles Hibbert	1	—	1
DF	(England)	Frank Price	1	—	1
HB	(England)	Alec Barclay	1	0	1
FW	(England)	Jack Curtis	1	0	1
FW	(England)	Patsy Hendren	1	0	1
HB	(England)	Joe Johnson	1	0	1
Opponents			1	0	1
Total			35	1	36

- Players listed in italics left the club mid-season.
- Source: 100 Years of Brentford

=== Management ===
Name	Nat	From	To	Record All Comps					Record League				
Name	Nat	From	To	P	W	D	L	W %	P	W	D	L	W %
Dusty Rhodes	(England)	5 September 1914	10 April 1915	27	9	8	10	33.33|	24	8	7	9	33.33

=== Summary ===
Games played	27 (24 Southern League Second Division, 3 FA Cup)
Games won	9 (8 Southern League Second Division, 1 FA Cup)
Games drawn	8 (7 Southern League Second Division, 1 FA Cup)
Games lost	10 (9 Southern League Second Division, 1 FA Cup)
Goals scored	36 (35 Southern League Second Division, 1 FA Cup)
Goals conceded	46 (45 Southern League Second Division, 1 FA Cup)
Clean sheets	9 (8 Southern League Second Division, 1 FA Cup)
Biggest league win	6–0 versus Pontypridd, 10 April 1915
Worst league defeat	8–0 versus Swansea Town, 3 April 1915
Most appearances	26, Alf Amos (23 Southern League Second Division, 3 FA Cup)
Top scorer (league)	7, Henry White
Top scorer (all competitions)	7, Henry White

== Transfers & loans ==
Guest players' arrival and departure dates correspond to their first and last appearances of the season.

Players transferred in
Date	Pos.	Name	Previous club	Fee	Ref.
6 June 1914	FW	(England) Jack Curtis	(England) Fulham	n/a	
12 June 1914	FW	(England) Stephen Stonley	(England) Woolwich Arsenal	n/a	
June 1914	FW	(England) Cyril Northam	n/a	n/a	
July 1914	GK	(England) Ed Martin	Unattached	Amateur	
August 1914	HB	(England) Bert Gibson	Unattached	Amateur	
August 1914	DF	(England) Oliver Payne	Unattached	Amateur	
August 1914	FW	(England) Arthur White	Unattached	Amateur	
September 1914	HB	(England) Jack Land	(England) Hounslow	n/a	
September 1914	FW	(England) Charles Symes	(England) South Tooting	n/a	
24 October 1914	DF	(England) Edward Hawkins	(England) Portsmouth	n/a	
October 1914	FW	(England) Jack Chapman	(England) Southall	Amateur	
October 1914	FW	(England) George Curtis	(England) Kingston upon Thames	Amateur	
28 November 1914	HB	(Ireland) Mick O'Brien	(Scotland) Celtic	n/a	
November 1914	HB	(England) Richard Jonas	(England) Shepherd's Bush	Amateur	
8 December 1914	FW	(England) Charles Allwright	(England) Kingston upon Thames	Amateur	
December 1914	FW	(England) Charles Hibbert	(England) Uxbridge	Amateur	
December 1914	DF	(England) Frank Price	(England) Shepherd's Bush	Amateur	
1914	FW	(England) Tommy Kent	(England) Slough Town	Amateur	
February 1915	FW	(England) Walter Chalk	(England) Old Kingstonians	Amateur	
March 1915	FW	(England) Herbert Allwright	Unattached	Amateur	
March 1915	FW	(England) F. Arnold	(England) West Kensington	Amateur	
March 1915	FW	(England) Michael Donaghy	(England) Luton Town	n/a	
1915	HB	(England) Leonard Forrester	(England) Millwall	Amateur	
1915	FW	(England) George Steers	(England) Shepherd's Bush	Amateur	
Players transferred out
Date	Pos.	Name	Subsequent club	Fee	Ref.
29 January 1915	FW	(England) Jack Curtis	(England) Stockport County	n/a	
4 February 1915	DF	(England) Walter Spratt	(England) Manchester United	£175	
29 March 1915	HB	(England) Joe Johnson	(England) Hartlepools United	n/a	
Guest players in
Date from	Pos.	Name	Previous club	Date to	Ref.
12 September 1914	FW	(England) Percy Matthews	(England) Uxbridge	13 October 1914	
7 November 1914	FW	(England) Richard Fraser	(England) Chelsea	2 January 1915	
31 October 1914	FW	(England) James Sangster	(England) Southall	9 December 1914	
9 January 1915	FW	(England) Charles Bedell	(England) Tufnell Park	9 January 1915	
16 January 1915	HB	(England) Harry Crane	(England) Woking	16 January 1915	
16 January 1915	FW	(England) Cecil Salisbury	(England) Woking	16 January 1915	
30 January 1915	FW	(England) Norman Carson	(England) Shepherd's Bush	13 February 1915	
6 March 1915	GK	(England) William Hughes	(England) Leyton	13 March 1915	
