= Tom McGovern =

Irish footballer

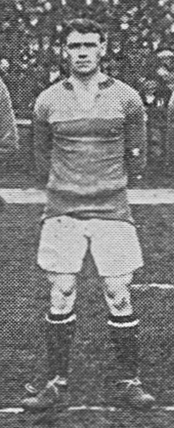
- McGovern while with Brentford in 1919.

Personal information
- Full name: Thomas McGovern
- Date of birth: 11 November 1888
- Place of birth: Keadue, Ireland
- Position: Wing half

Senior career*
Years	Team	Apps	(Gls)
1911–1912	Leith Athletic	28	(2)
1912–1913	Halifax Town		
1913–1920	Brentford	63	(2)
1920–1924	Queens Park Rangers	2	(0)
- * Club domestic league appearances and goals

Thomas McGovern was an Irish professional footballer who played as a wing half and is best remembered for his time in the Southern League with Brentford, before, during and after the First World War. He also played in the Scottish League for Leith Athletic and in the Football League for Queens Park Rangers.

== Career statistics ==
Appearances and goals by club, season and competition
Club	Season	League			National Cup		Total	
Club	Season	Division	Apps	Goals	Apps	Goals	Apps	Goals
Leith Athletic	1910–11	Scottish League Second Division	7	1	—		7	1
Leith Athletic	1911–12	Scottish League Second Division	21	1	5	0	26	1
Leith Athletic	Total		28	2	5	0	33	2
Brentford	1913–14	Southern League Second Division	20	2	0	0	20	2
Brentford	1914–15	Southern League Second Division	15	0	3	0	18	0
Brentford	1919–20	Southern League First Division	28	0	1	0	29	0
Brentford	Total		63	2	4	0	67	2
Queens Park Rangers	1920–21	Third Division	2	0	0	0	2	0
Career Total			93	4	9	0	102	4

== Honours ==
Brentford

- London Combination: 1918–19
