= Henry Simons (footballer) =

English footballer

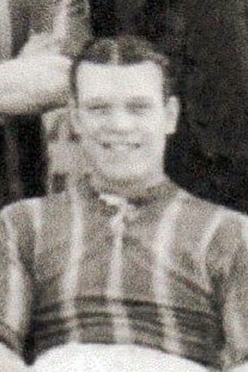
- Simons while with Brentford in 1913

Personal information
- Full name: Henry Thomas Simons
- Date of birth: 26 November 1887
- Place of birth: Hackney, England
- Date of death: 26 August 1956 (aged 68)
- Place of death: Stoke Newington, England
- Position: Forward

Senior career*
Years	Team	Apps	(Gls)
1906	Peel Institute		
1906	Clapton Orient	7	(1)
1906–1907	Leyton		
1907	Tufnell Park		
1907–1908	Sheffield United		
1908	Shepherd's Bush		
1908–1909	Luton Town		
1909–1910	Doncaster Rovers		(12)
1910–1912	Sheffield United	9	(2)
1912	Halifax Town		
1912–1913	Merthyr Town		
1913–1914	Brentford	25	(19)
1914	Fulham	9	(4)
1914–1916	Queens Park Rangers	19	(7)
1920	Norwich City	3	(0)
1920	Margate		
- * Club domestic league appearances and goals

Henry Thomas Simons (26 November 1887 – 26 August 1956), sometimes known as Tommy Simons, was an English professional footballer who played as a forward in the Football League for Fulham, Sheffield United, Clapton Orient and Norwich City.

== Career statistics ==
Appearances and goals by club, season and competition
Club	Season	League			FA Cup		Total	
Club	Season	Division	Apps	Goals	Apps	Goals	Apps	Goals
Brentford	1913–14	Southern League Second Division	25	19	3	0	28	19
Fulham	1914–15	Second Division	9	4	—		9	4
Queens Park Rangers	1914–15	Southern League First Division	19	7	3	1	22	8
Career Total			53	30	6	1	59	31
