= Charles Allwright =

English footballer

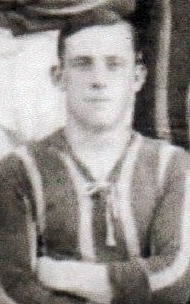
- Allwright while with Brentford in 1912.

Personal information
- Full name: Charles Russell Spencer Allwright
- Date of birth: 11 June 1888
- Place of birth: Brentford, England
- Date of death: May 1966 (aged 77)
- Place of death: Wallingford, England
- Position: Outside right

Senior career*
Years	Team	Apps	(Gls)
1910–1917	Brentford	2	(0)
1919–1920	Bristol City	11	(0)
1920	Swindon Town	0	(0)
- * Club domestic league appearances and goals

Charles Russell Spencer Allwright (11 June 1888 – May 1966) was an English professional footballer who played as an outside right in the Football League for Bristol City.

== Career statistics ==
Appearances and goals by club, season and competition
Club	Season	League			FA Cup		Total	
Club	Season	Division	Apps	Goals	Apps	Goals	Apps	Goals
Brentford	1914–15	Southern League Second Division	5	0	—		5	0
Career total			5	0	0	0	5	0
