= Jack Curtis (footballer, born 1888) =

English footballer

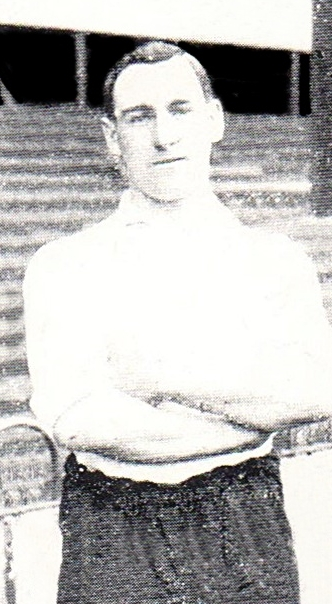
- Curtis while with Tottenham Hotspur in 1910.

Personal information
- Full name: John Joseph Curtis
- Date of birth: 13 December 1888
- Place of birth: South Bank, England
- Date of death: 8 March 1955 (aged 66)
- Place of death: Wimbledon, England
- Height: 5 ft 5 in (1.65 m)
- Position: Outside left

Senior career*
Years	Team	Apps	(Gls)
1904–1905	Eston United		
1905–1906	South Bank St Peters		
1906–1907	Sunderland	1	(0)
1907	South Bank		
1907–1908	Shildon Athletic		
1908–1909	Gainsborough Trinity	30	(2)
1909–1913	Tottenham Hotspur	82	(5)
1913–1914	Fulham	2	(0)
1914–1915	Brentford	14	(1)
1915–1919	Stockport County	15	(1)
1915–1916	→ Brentford (guest)	13	(0)
1919–1920	Middlesbrough	5	(0)
- Shildon Athletic
- * Club domestic league appearances and goals

John Joseph Curtis (13 December 1888 – 8 March 1955) was an English professional footballer who played in the Football League for Sunderland, Gainsborough Trinity, Tottenham Hotspur, Fulham, Stockport County and Middlesbrough as an outside left. He is best remembered for his four-year spell with Tottenham Hotspur between 1909 and 1913 and later coached in the Netherlands.

== Career ==
An outside left, Curtis began his career with spells at non-League clubs Eston United, South Bank St Peters, South Bank, Shildon Athletic, a period which was bisected by an unsuccessful spell with First Division club Sunderland during the 1906–07 season. Curtis joined Second Division club Gainsborough Trinity in 1908 and scored two goals in 30 league appearances, before joining divisional rivals Tottenham Hotspur the following year. Almost immediately after Curtis joined the club, promotion to the First Division was achieved and he went on to score five goals in 89 appearances during just over five years at White Hart Lane. After leaving White Hart Lane in 1913, Curtis had spells at Fulham, Brentford, Stockport County and Middlesbrough, before rejoining Shildon Athletic in 1920, where he ended his career.

== Personal life ==
Curtis enlisted as a driver in the Royal Field Artillery in early 1915 during the First World War. He served with the 36th Battery of the 1A Reserve Brigade.

== Career statistics ==
Appearances and goals by club, season and competition
Club	Season	League			FA Cup		Total	
Club	Season	Division	Apps	Goals	Apps	Goals	Apps	Goals
Sunderland	1906–07	First Division	1	0	0	0	1	0
Tottenham Hotspur	1908–09	Second Division	2	1	—		2	1
Tottenham Hotspur	1909–10	First Division	37	3	4	0	41	3
Tottenham Hotspur	1910–11	First Division	30	1	3	0	33	1
Tottenham Hotspur	1911–12	First Division	9	0	0	0	9	0
Tottenham Hotspur	1912–13	First Division	4	0	0	0	4	0
Tottenham Hotspur	Total		82	5	7	0	89	5
Fulham	1913–14	Second Division	2	0	0	0	2	0
Brentford	1914–15	Southern League Second Division	14	1	2	0	16	1
Stockport County	1914–15	Second Division	15	1	—		15	1
Middlesbrough	1919–20	First Division	5	0	0	0	5	0
Career total			119	7	9	0	128	7
