= Stephen Stonley =

English footballer

Personal information
- Date of birth: 29 September 1889
- Place of birth: Sunderland, England
- Date of death: September 1967 (aged 77–78)
- Place of death: Greenwich, England
- Height: 5 ft 8 1/2 in (1.74 m)
- Position: Centre forward

Senior career*
| Years | Team | Apps | (Gls) |
- Seaham
- Northampton Town
| –1912 | Newcastle City | | |
| 1912–1913 | Woolwich Arsenal | 38 | (14) |
| 1914–1915 | Brentford | 14 | (4) |
- * Club domestic league appearances and goals

Stephen J. Stonley (29 September 1889 – September 1967) was an English professional footballer who played in the Football League for Woolwich Arsenal as a centre forward. He also played in the Southern League for Northampton Town and Brentford.

== Personal life ==
Stonley served as a gunner with the Royal Garrison Artillery and later worked at the Royal Arsenal during the First World War.

== Career statistics ==
Appearances and goals by club, season and competition
| Club | Season | League | | | FA Cup | | Total | |
| Club | Season | Division | Apps | Goals | Apps | Goals | Apps | Goals |
|---|---|---|---|---|---|---|---|---|
| Woolwich Arsenal | 1912–13 | First Division | 10 | 1 | 0 | 0 | 10 | 1 |
| Woolwich Arsenal | 1913–14 | Second Division | 28 | 13 | 1 | 0 | 29 | 13 |
| Woolwich Arsenal | Total | | 38 | 14 | 1 | 0 | 39 | 14 |
| Brentford | 1914–15 | Southern League Second Division | 14 | 4 | 3 | 1 | 17 | 5 |
| Career total | | | 52 | 18 | 4 | 1 | 56 | 19 |
