= Frank Bentley =

English footballer

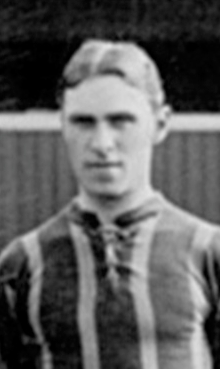
- Bentley while with Brentford 1912

Personal information
- Full name: Frank William Bentley
- Date of birth: 9 October 1886
- Place of birth: Butt Lane, England
- Date of death: December 1958 (aged 72)
- Place of death: Stoke-on-Trent, England
- Position: Wing half

Youth career
- 1906–1907: Butt Lane

Senior career*
Years	Team	Apps	(Gls)
1907	Stoke	1	(0)
1909–1911	Tottenham Hotspur	36	(0)
1912–1914	Brentford	59	(0)
- * Club domestic league appearances and goals

Frank William Bentley (9 October 1886 – 1958) was an English footballer who played in the Football League for Stoke City and Tottenham Hotspur.

== Career ==
Bentley began his career at his local side Butt Lane, before joining Stoke in 1907. He was not considered a first team player by manager Horace Austerberry but he did play Bentley in the clubs FA Cup fixtures in 1907–08 where he scored against Gainsborough Trinity. He played just once in the League for Stoke against West Bromwich Albion on 14 March 1908. At the end of the season Stoke left the league after suffering financial meltdown and joined the club who replaced Stoke, Tottenham Hotspur. He played 41 matches for Spurs in three seasons at White Hart Lane. He went on to play for Brentford where he ended his playing career.

== Career statistics ==
Appearances and goals by club, season and competition
Club	Season	League			FA Cup		Total	
Club	Season	Division	Apps	Goals	Apps	Goals	Apps	Goals
Stoke	1907–08	Second Division	1	0	4	1	5	1
Tottenham Hotspur	1909–10	First Division	19	0	2	0	21	0
Tottenham Hotspur	1910–11	First Division	16	0	3	0	19	0
Tottenham Hotspur	1911–12	First Division	1	0	0	0	1	0
Tottenham Hotspur	Total		36	0	5	0	41	0
Brentford	1912–13	Southern League First Division	31	0	2	0	33	0
Brentford	1913–14	Southern League Second Division	28	0	3	0	31	0
Brentford	Total		59	0	5	0	64	0
Career total			96	0	10	1	110	1
