= Joe Johnson (footballer, born 1882) =

English footballer

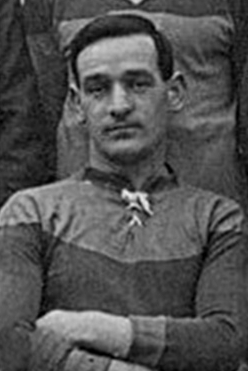
- Johnson while with Brentford in 1914

Personal information
- Full name: Joseph Johnson
- Date of birth: 12 December 1882
- Place of birth: Sunderland, England
- Date of death: 1966 (aged 83–84)
- Place of death: Darlington, England
- Positions: Outside left; inside left

Senior career*
Years	Team	Apps	(Gls)
- Sunderland West End
–1912	Houghton Rovers		
1912–1913	Clapton Orient	3	(0)
1913–1915	Brentford	39	(16)
1915	Hartlepools United	5	(2)
- Forge United
–1920	Darlington		
- * Club domestic league appearances and goals

Joseph Johnson (12 December 1882 – 1966) was an English professional footballer who played as a forward in the Football League for Clapton Orient. He also played non-League football for Brentford and Hartlepools United before the First World War and for Darlington after it.

== Personal life ==
Johnson worked at the Royal Arsenal during the First World War.

== Career statistics ==
Appearances and goals by club, season and competition
Club	Season	League			FA Cup		Total	
Club	Season	Division	Apps	Goals	Apps	Goals	Apps	Goals
Brentford	1913–14	Southern League Second Division	28	15	3	1	31	16
Brentford	1914–15	Southern League Second Division	11	1	2	0	13	1
Brentford	Total		39	16	5	1	44	17
Hartlepools United	1914–15	North Eastern League	5	2	―		5	2
Career Total			44	18	5	1	49	19
