= Richard Sloley =

English footballer

Personal information
- Full name: Richard W. Sloley
- Date of birth: 20 August 1891
- Place of birth: Barnstaple, England
- Date of death: 17 October 1946 (aged 55)
- Place of death: Fitzrovia, London, England
- Position: Inside right

Senior career*
Years	Team	Apps	(Gls)
- Corinthian
- Cambridge University
1914	Brentford	5	(8)
- Corinthian
1919–1922	Corinthian		
1919	→ Aston Villa (loan)	2	(0)
1920–1927	Ealing Association		

International career
1919–1920	England Amateurs	4	(3)
1920	Great Britain	1	(0)
- * Club domestic league appearances and goals

Richard W. Sloley (20 August 1891 – 17 October 1946) was an English amateur footballer.

== Career ==
Sloley played as an inside right in the Football League for Aston Villa. He was capped by England at amateur level and represented Great Britain at the 1920 Summer Olympics.

After the Olympics, Sloley joined Ealing Association, becoming Club president. In 1928, Sloley proposed a new amateur club, Argonauts, to be an English version of the Scottish Queen's Park. The Argonauts had an arrangement to play at Wembley Stadium, which was otherwise only being used for internationals and the FA Cup final, but, after the Argonauts' application to join the Football League was refused, Sloley arranged for Ealing to move to Wembley, as an encouragement for amateur football as a whole. The move was not a success and the Argonauts were subsequently abandoned.

== Personal life ==
Sloley was a Cambridge Blue and as of 1911, was working as an assistant schoolmaster in Guildford. He served as a lieutenant in the Royal Army Service Corps during the First World War.

== Career statistics ==
Appearances and goals by club, season and competition
Club	Season	League			FA Cup		Total	
Club	Season	Division	Apps	Goals	Apps	Goals	Apps	Goals
Brentford	1913–14	Southern League Second Division	2	3	—		2	3
Brentford	1914–15	Southern League Second Division	3	5	1	0	4	5
Brentford	Total		5	8	1	0	6	8
Aston Villa (loan)	1919–20	First Division	2	0	—		2	0
Career total			7	8	1	0	8	8
