= John Chapman (cricketer, born 1814) =

English cricketer

John Chapman (28 November 1814 – 14 April 1896) was an English first-class cricketer active 1842–48 who played for Nottinghamshire.

Chapman was born in West Bridgford, Nottingham and died in Gainsborough, Lincolnshire. Chapman participated in a total of 13 first-class matches.
