= John Henry Chapman =

British businessman and philatelist (1860–1942)

- Born: 1860
- Died: 27 February, 1942 (aged 81–82)
- Occupation: Philatelist

John Henry Chapman (1860 – 27 February 1942) was a British businessman active in Sheffield steel companies, and a philatelist who signed the Roll of Distinguished Philatelists in 1926. He was a specialist in the stamps of Queensland.
