= John Ratcliffe Chapman =

British firearm designer (1815–1899)

- Born: John Ratcliffe Chapman; January 9, 1815; Lincolnshire, England
- Died: February 4, 1899 (aged 84)
- Occupations: railway contractor, gunsmith, author

John Ratcliffe Chapman (January 9,1815 – February 4, 1899) was a British born contractor and engineer. He was the son of John Chapman, a farmer and “contractor for roads and other public works” who built canals and sections of early British railways, notably the London & Birmingham line. When his father died in 1836 John Ratcliffe Chapman took over his father's contracts and went on to build the Aylesbury Railway and part of the North Midland Railway in Yorkshire where he met his wife Mary Pollitt. With her he emigrated to America in 1842 on HMS Britannia with the great author Charles Dickens aboard. Dickens mentions Chapman briefly as follows in Chapter II of "American Notes, ". . . and that the gentleman carried more guns with him than Robinson Crusoe, wore a shooting-coat, and had two great dogs on board." (Note: An earlier version of this entry named the engineer William Chapman as John Ratcliffe Chapman's father. Birth records from Lincolnshire have shown this to be incorrect.)

Chapman, a man of considerable wealth for the time, purchased several hundred acres along the south shore of Oneida Lake, in Madison County, New York, where he, his wife and their nine sons established many local farms and businesses, including a cheese factory. Chapman invented, designed and manufactured the telescopic rifle sight. He also invented and patented a four-barrel revolving rifle. It is in the possession of a family member living near Rochester, NY. In his book The Improved American Rifle, Chapman documented the first telescopic sights he showed Morgan James how to make. Together they manufactured the Chapman-James sight. Chapman also showed James how to make the most accurate rifles of the day. Several of these rifles are currently on display at the Army Museum at West Point. Chapman's book was published in New York, NY by D. Appleton &. Co. 1848. This work has been reprinted as recently as 1976.

== Bibliography ==
- John Ratcliffe Chapman, "Instructions to Young Marksmen in all that relates to the General Construction, Practical Manipulation, etc., etc., as exhibited in the Improved American Rifle," New York, D. Appleton &. Co. 1848.
- Out of Nowhere: A History of the Military Sniper (Pegler 2004)
