= Bob Mitchell (footballer) =

Scottish footballer

Personal information
- Full name: Robert Mitchell
- Date of birth: 11 February 1889
- Place of birth: Paisley, Scotland
- Position: Inside right

Senior career*
Years	Team	Apps	(Gls)
–1911	Cliftonville		
1911–1913	Barnsley	4	(0)
1913	Brentford	0	(0)
- Distillery
- * Club domestic league appearances and goals

Robert Mitchell was a Scottish professional footballer who played in the Football League for Barnsley as an inside right.
