= Cyril Northam =

English footballer

Personal information
- Full name: Cyril George Northam
- Date of birth: 4 October 1894
- Place of birth: Hendon, England
- Date of death: 21 January 1981 (aged 86)
- Place of death: Edinburgh, Scotland
- Position: Outside right

Senior career*
| Years | Team | Apps | (Gls) |
| 1914 | Brentford | 0 | (0) |
- Dulwich Hamlet
| 1920 | Wrexham | 0 | (0) |
- Connah's Quay & Shotton
- Dulwich Hamlet
| 1922 | Wrexham | 16 | (4) |
- Connah's Quay & Shotton
- Whitchurch
- * Club domestic league appearances and goals

Cyril George Northam (4 October 1894 – 21 January 1981) was an English professional footballer who played in the Football League for Wrexham as an outside right.

== Personal life ==
As of 1911, Northam was working as a merchant's clerk. Northam served as a private in the London Regiment during the First World War and was commissioned as a second lieutenant and attached to the Royal Scots in September 1916. His younger brother Arthur also served in the London Regiment and was killed in France on 23 May 1917. Northam served again in the Second World War, as lieutenant in the Royal Army Ordnance Corps. He remained in the army after the war and rose to the rank of honorary major, before moving back down to second lieutenant on 25 April 1952.

== Career statistics ==
Appearances and goals by club, season and competition
| Club | Season | League | | | National Cup | | Total | |
| Club | Season | Division | Apps | Goals | Apps | Goals | Apps | Goals |
|---|---|---|---|---|---|---|---|---|
| Wrexham | 1921–22 | Third Division North | 16 | 4 | ― | | 16 | 4 |
| Career total | | | 16 | 10 | 4 | 0 | 16 | 4 |
