= Jack Chapman (footballer) =

English footballer

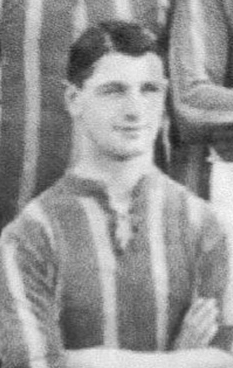
- Chapman with Brentford in 1913.

Personal information
- Full name: John Chapman
- Date of birth: 29 April 1895
- Place of birth: Islington, England
- Position: Centre forward

Senior career*
Years	Team	Apps	(Gls)
1912–1915	Southall		
1913–1914	Brentford	26	(16)
1914	Brentford	2	(0)
1918	Southall		
1919–1920	Clapton Orient	9	(2)
1921	Excelsior		
- * Club domestic league appearances and goals

John Chapman was an English amateur footballer who played as a centre forward in the Football League for Clapton Orient. He was a first reserve for an England Amateurs match versus Ireland in November 1913, but failed to win a cap.

== Personal life ==
Chapman served in the Postal Section of the Royal Engineers during the First World War.

== Career statistics ==
Appearances and goals by club, season and competition
Club	Season	League			FA Cup		Total	
Club	Season	Division	Apps	Goals	Apps	Goals	Apps	Goals
Brentford	1913–14	Southern League Second Division	25	16	3	1	28	17
Brentford	1914–15	Southern League Second Division	2	0	0	0	2	0
Brentford	Brentford total		27	16	3	1	30	17
Clapton Orient	1919–20	Second Division	9	2	0	0	9	2
Career Total			36	18	3	1	39	19
