= 1922–23 Queens Park Rangers F.C. season =

English football club season

Queens Park Rangers
1922–23 season
- Chairman: J. H. Fielding
- Manager: Ned Liddell
- Stadium: Loftus Road
- Third Division South: 11th
- FA Cup: Fourth Round
- Top goalscorer: League: Dick Parker 16; All: Dick Parker 20
- Highest home attendance: 20,000 (26 August 1922) Vs Watford
- Lowest home attendance: 4,000 (21 March 1923) Vs Reading
- Average home league attendance: 10,810
- Biggest win: 4–0 (25 December 1922) Vs Luton Town
- Biggest defeat: 0–3 (2/4/1923) Vs Swansea Town
Home colours	Away colours

The 1922–23 Queens Park Rangers season was the club's 32nd season of existence and their 3rd season in the Football League Third Division. QPR finished 11th in the league, and were eliminated by Sheffield United in the quarterfinals of the FA Cup.

== League standings ==
Pos	Team	Pld	W	D	L	GF	GA	GAv	Pts
9	Swindon Town	42	17	11	14	62	56	1.107	45
10	Watford	42	17	10	15	57	54	1.056	44
11	Queens Park Rangers	42	16	10	16	54	49	1.102	42
12	Charlton Athletic	42	14	14	14	55	51	1.078	42
13	Bristol Rovers	42	13	16	13	35	36	0.972	42

=== Results ===
QPR scores given first

Win Draw Loss

=== Third Division South ===
Date	Venue	Opponent	Result	Score F–A	Scorers	Attendance	League Position
26 August 1922	H	Watford	L	1–2	Birch	20,000	17
28 August 1922	A	Norwich City	D	1–1	Davis	10,000	18
2 September 1922	A	Watford	W	3–0	Davis, Chandler 2	10,783	9
4 September 1922	H	Norwich City	W	2–0	Gregory, C., Birch	8,000	3
9 September 1922	H	Gillingham	W	2–1	Birch 2	9,000	4
11 September 1922	A	Brentford	W	3–1	Parker 2 (1 pen), Birch	15,000	2
16 September 1922	A	Gillingham	W	1–0	Birch (pen)	8,000	2
23 September 1922	H	Brighton & Hove Albion	D	0–0		12,000	2
30 September 1922	A	Brighton & Hove Albion	L	0–2		11,000	3
7 October 1922	H	Swindon Town	L	0–2		12,000	5
14 October 1922	A	Swindon Town	L	0–1		8,000	8
21 October 1922	H	Charlton Athletic	L	1–2	Birch	11,000	10
28 October 1922	A	Charlton Athletic	D	1–1	Birch	10,000	11
4 November 1922	A	Aberdare Athletic	D	0–0		7,000	10
11 November 1922	H	Aberdare Athletic	W	4–1	Hart, Davis 3	8,000	10
18 November 1922	A	Newport County	L	0–1		8,000	11
25 November 1922	H	Newport County	D	1–1	Hart	5,000	9
9 December 1922	H	Brentford	D	1–1	Marsden (pen)	19,000	10
16 December 1922	H	Bristol City	L	1–2	Marsden (pen)	12,000	11
23 December 1922	A	Bristol City	L	2–3	Davis 2	15,000	12
25 December 1922	H	Luton Town	W	4–0	Parker 2, Birch 2	16,000	10
26 December 1922	A	Luton Town	L	0–1		11,000	11
30 December 1922	H	Portsmouth	L	0–1		9,000	13
6 January 1923	A	Portsmouth	D	1–1	Parker	11,851	14
20 January 1923	H	Millwall	L	2–3	Parker, Davis	10,000	15
27 January 1923	A	Millwall	D	0–0		20,000	14
10 February 1923	A	Plymouth Argyle	L	0–2		11,000	16
17 February 1923	H	Bristol Rovers	W	3–1	Parker, Davis, Chandler	9,000	14
3 March 1923	H	Reading	W	1–0	Davis	10,000	14
15 March 1923	H	Plymouth Argyle	L	2–3	Birch, Parker	4,000	16
17 March 1923	A	Southend United	L	0–2		7,000	17
21 March 1923	A	Reading	D	0–0		4,000	16
24 March 1923	H	Southend United	W	1–0	Davis	8,000	14
26 March 1923	A	Bristol Rovers	W	3–1	Parker, Chandler, Davis	18,000	13
30 March 1923	H	Swansea Town	W	2–1	Davis, Chandler	15,000	11
31 March 1923	A	Merthyr Town	W	1–0	Parker	5,000	11
2 April 1923	A	Swansea Town	L	0–3		23,000	12
7 April 1923	H	Merthyr Town	D	1–1	Vigrass	8,000	11
14 April 1923	A	Exeter City	W	2–1	Parker 2	6,000	12
21 April 1923	H	Exeter City	W	2–0	Parker 2	6,000	11
28 April 1923	A	Northampton Town	L	2–4	Parker 2	7,000	11
5 May 1923	H	Northampton Town	W	3–2	Chandler, Williams (og), Edgley	9,000	11

=== FA Cup ===
Round	Date	Venue	Opponent	Result	Score F–A	Scorers	Attendance
Sixth round qualifying	Saturday 16 December 1922			BYE			
First Round	13 January 1923	H	Crystal Palace (Second Division)	W	1–0	Gregory, J.	18,030
Second Round	3 February 1923	A	Wigan Borough (Third Division North)	W	4–2	Parker 7', ?' Chandler, Birch	23,454
Third Round	24 February 1923	H	South Shields (Second Division)	W	3–0	Parker 2, Gregory, J.	15,099
Fourth Round	10 March 1923	H	Sheffield United (First Division)	L	0–1		20,007

=== London Professional Charity Fund ===
Date	Venue	Opponent	Result	Score F–A	Scorers	Attendance
9 October 1922	A	Brentford	L	1–2	Vigrass	

=== London Challenge Cup ===
Round	Date	Venue	Opponent	Result	Score F–A	Scorers	Attendance
LCC 1	16 October 1922	H	Charlton	D	2–2	Birch, Parker	3,000
LCC 1 Rep	30 October 1922	A	Charlton	L	1–2	Birch	

== Squad ==
Position	Nationality	Name	Third Division South		FA Cup		Total	
Position	Nationality	Name	Apps	Goals	Apps	Goals	Apps	Goals
GK	ENG	Len Hill	42		4		46	
GK	ENG	Bill Field						
GK	ENG	Herbert Lock						
DF	ENG	Edward Watson	8				8	
DF	WAL	Reg John	33		4		37	
DF	ENG	Ben Marsden	34	2	4			
DF	SCO	Ken Bain	36		4		40	
DF	ENG	George Hart						
DF	ENG	Fred Watts	2					
DF	ENG	Ernie Grimsdell	2				2	
MF	ENG	Charlie Rance	13				13	
MF	ENG	Jimmy Leach	1				1	
MF	ENG	Bill Hurst						
MF	ENG	John Vigrass	33	1	4		37	1
MF	ENG	Shirley Abbott						
MF	ENG	Albert Read						
MF	ENG	Jack Burnham	4				4	
MF	ENG	Jack Gregory	33		4	2	37	2
MF	ENG	Harry Lane	5				5	
FW	ENG	Jimmy Birch	32	11	4	1	36	12
FW	ENG	Harry Hart	5	2				
FW	ENG	Arthur Davis	35	13	4		39	13
FW	ENG	Ernie Butler	21				21	
FW	ENG	Dick Parker	28	16	4	4	32	20
FW	ENG	Jimmy Keen						
FW	ENG	Harry Dobinson						
FW	ENG	George Benson						
FW	ENG	William Goodman						
FW	ENG	Alex Ramsay						
FW	ENG	Harry Edgley	33	1	4		37	1
FW	ENG	Jack Bradshaw						
FW	ENG	Arthur Chandler	36	6	4	1		
FW	ENG	Bill Gardner	2				2	
FW	ENG	Clarence Gregory	24	1			24	1

== Transfers in ==
Name	from	Date	Fee
Ernie Butler	Ebbw Vale	3 July 1922	
Jimmy Leach	Aston Villa	3 July 1922	
Findlater, Arthur *	Botwell Mission	3 July 1922	
Dick Parker	Wallsend	1 August 1922	
Thomas, David *		22 August 1922	
William Goodman	Northfleet U	25 August 1922	
Ashby, H *	Tooting Town	Aug1922	
Hemming, Alec	Guildford U	22 Aug 1922	
Wallace, John	Rotherham County	2 September 1922	
Charlie Rance	Derby	21 September 1922	
Ferrari, Fred *	Barking Town	20 October 1922	
Bill Field	Oxford City	22 November 1922	
Gates, Basil *	London Caledonians	26 January 1923	
Bill Gardner	Spennymoor U	26 March 1923	
Allison, Thomas	Washington Colliery	5 April 1923	
Bailey, Sid *	Grays Athletic	21 Apr 1922	
Moiser, Gilbert *	Wombwell	8 May 1923	
Shirley Abbott	Portsmouth	21 May 1923	
Arthur Davis	Aston Villa	21 May 1922	Free
Jimmy Keen	Newcastle	24 May 1923	
George Hart	Bedlington United	25 May 1923	
Bill Hurst	Derby	8 June 1923	
Harry Dobinson	Burnley	15 June 1923	
Mason, John	South Shields	28 June 1923	
George Benson	Stalybridge Celtic	28 June 1923	
Mason, John	South Shields	28 June 1923	

== Transfers out ==
Name	from	Date	Fee	Date	To	Fee
Jack Bradshaw	Aberdare Athletic	18 June 1921		cs 1922	Chatham	Free
Prentice, Robert	Arcadians (Rsa)	21 July 1921		cs 1922		
Baines, Alexander		6 Aug 1921		cs 1922		
Pusey, C *	Harlesden Town	24 Aug 1921		cs 1922		
Mallett, A E *	Brentford	24 Aug 1921		cs 1922		
Luck, Charles *	Southend Corinthians	7 Oct 1921		cs 1922		
Baxter, Harry *	R.A.F.	8 Nov 1921		cs 1922		
Maidment, Jimmy *	Robert Thompson's	Aug1921		cs 1922	South Shields	Free
Gilbert, Bert *	Harlesden Town	24 Aug 1921		cs 1922	Civil Service	
Bailey, Sid *	Grays Athletic	21 Apr 1922		cs 1922	Northfleet U	Free
Cadwell, Albert *	Nunhead	2 Mar 1922		cs 1922	Nunhead	
Toby, Charles *	Bostall Heath	Mar1921		cs 1922	Bostall Heath	
Bell, Charlie	Barrow	30 May 1921		cs 1922	Retired (Reading coach) Free	
Albert Read	Tufnell Park	30 May 1921		July 1922	Reading	Free
Grant, George	Millwall	14 Jul 1920		August 1922	Northfleet U	Free
Ashford, Herbert	Brentford	28 Aug 1920		August 1922	Notts County	Free
Herbert Lock	Glasgow Rangers	29 July 1921	Free	September 1922	Southampton	Free
Hemming, Alec	Guildford U	22 Aug 1922		September 1922		
Barnes, Edward *	Charlton	9 June 1922		November 1922	St Albans City	
Clarence Gregory	Sunderland	31 May 1922	£150	May 1923	Wellington Town	Free
Edward Watson	Sunderland	30 May 1921		June 1923	Rochdale	
Arthur Chandler	Handley Page	16 August 1920		June 1923	Leicester	£2,000
Harry Lane	Charlton	17 June 1922		cs 1923		
Charlie Rance	Derby	21 September 1922		cs 1923	Retired	
Ferrari, Fred *	Barking Town	20 October 1922		cs 1923	Barking Town	
Jimmy Leach	Aston Villa	3 July 1922		cs 1923	Retired	
Wallace, John	Rotherham County	2 September 1922		cs 1923		
Hawkins, Alfred *	Grays Athletic	9 June 1922		cs 1923		
Thomas, David *		22 August 1922		cs 1923		
