= 1923–24 Queens Park Rangers F.C. season =

English football club season

Queens Park Rangers
1923–24 season
- Chairman: J. H. Fielding
- Manager: Ned Liddell, resigned 13 March 1924
- Stadium: Loftus Road
- Third Division South: 22nd
- FA Cup: 1st Round
- London Challenge Cup: 1st Round
- Top goalscorer: League: Dick Parker (14); All: Dick Parker (14)
- Highest home attendance: 18,000 (25 August 1923) Vs Brentford
- Lowest home attendance: 4,000 (19 January 1924) Vs Brighton & Hove Albion
- Average home league attendance: 8,714
- Biggest win: 3–0 (15 December 1923) Vs Merthyr Town, (5 April 1924) Vs.Aberdare Athletic
- Biggest defeat: 0–7 (5 January 1924) Vs Portsmouth
Home colours	Away colours

The 1923–24 Queens Park Rangers season was the club's 33rd season of existence and their 4th season in the Football League Third Division. QPR finished 22nd in the league, and were eliminated in the first round of the 1923–24 FA Cup.

== League standings ==
Pos	Team	Pld	W	D	L	GF	GA	GAv	Pts	Promotion
18	Reading	42	13	9	20	51	57	0.895	35	
19	Southend United	42	12	10	20	53	84	0.631	34	
20	Watford	42	9	15	18	45	54	0.833	33	
21	Bournemouth & Boscombe Athletic	42	11	11	20	40	65	0.615	33	Re-elected
22	Queens Park Rangers	42	11	9	22	37	77	0.481	31	Re-elected

=== Results ===
QPR scores given first

Win Draw Loss

=== Third Division South ===
Date	Venue	Opponent	Result	Score F–A	Scorers	Attendance	League Position
25 August 1923	H	Brentford	W	1–0	Parker	18,000	9
27 August 1923	A	Bristol Rovers	L	1–2	Parker	8,000	12
1 September 1923	A	Brentford	W	1–0	Birch	15,000	6
5 September 1923	H	Bristol Rovers	L	1–2	Davis	8,000	11
8 September 1923	A	Swindon Town	D	0–0		6,000	11
12 September 1923	H	Newport County	L	0–3		10,000	15
15 September 1923	H	Swindon Town	D	2–2	Birch, Davis	6,000	15
22 September 1923	A	Watford	W	2–0	Davis, Birch	8,218	9
29 September 1923	H	Watford	W	2–1	Birch, Marsden (pen)	12,000	7
6 October 1923	A	Swansea Town	L	0–2		18,000	11
13 October 1923	H	Swansea Town	D	2–2	Davis, Marsden (pen)	12,000	12
20 October 1923	A	Northampton Town	L	0–3		8,994	13
27 October 1923	H	Northampton Town	W	3–2	Robinson, Davis 2	9,000	11
3 November 1923	A	Gillingham	D	0–0		9,000	11
10 November 1923	H	Gillingham	D	1–1	Davis	9,000	10
1 December 1923	H	Plymouth Argyle	W	3–2	Parker, Birch, Davis	8,000	11
8 December 1923	A	Plymouth Argyle	L	0–2		8,000	12
15 December 1923	H	Merthyr Town	W	3–0	Parker 2, Marsden (pen)	7,000	11
22 December 1923	A	Merthyr Town	L	0–2		2,000	11
25 December 1923	H	Charlton Athletic	D	0–0		15,000	10
26 December 1923	A	Charlton Athletic	L	0–3		10,000	12
29 December 1923	H	Portsmouth	L	0–2		8,000	13
1 January 1924	A	Newport County	L	1–2	Parker (pen)	6,000	13
5 January 1924	A	Portsmouth	L	0–7		11,085	16
19 January 1924	H	Brighton & Hove Albion	W	1–0	Parker (pen)	4,000	14
26 January 1924	A	Brighton & Hove Albion	L	0–3		8,000	15
2 February 1924	H	Luton Town	L	0–2		9,000	17
9 February 1924	A	Luton Town	L	0–2		6,000	18
16 February 1924	H	Reading	L	1–4	Birch	6,000	18
23 February 1924	A	Reading	L	0–4		8,032	20
1 March 1924	H	Bournemouth & Boscombe Athletic	L	0–1		8,000	21
8 March 1924	A	Bournemouth & Boscombe Athletic	L	1–3	Johnson	5,000	22
15 March 1924	A	Millwall	L	0–3		25,000	22
22 March 1924	H	Millwall	D	1–1	Parker	15,000	22
29 March 1924	A	Aberdare Athletic	D	1–1	Birch	5,000	22
5 April 1924	H	Aberdare Athletic	W	3–0	Parker 2, Johnson	6,000	22
12 April 1924	A	Southend United	L	2–4	Parker (pen), Birch	5,000	22
18 April 1924	H	Norwich City	W	2–1	Parker, Johnson	10,000	22
19 April 1924	H	Southend United	D	0–0		8,000	21
21 April 1924	A	Norwich City	L	0–5		12,000	22
26 April 1924	A	Exeter City	L	0–3		5,000	22
3 May 1924	H	Exeter City	W	2–0	Parker 2	7,000	22

=== FA Cup ===
Round	Date	Venue	Opponent	Result	Score F–A	Scorers	Attendance
Sixth round qualifying	15 December 1923			BYE			
FACup 1	12 January 1924	H	Notts County (First Division)	L	1–2	Davis	15,000

=== London Professional Charity Fund ===
Date	Venue	Opponent	Result	Score F–A	Scorers	Attendance
1 October 1923	H	Brentford	L	0–2		2,000

=== London Challenge Cup ===
Round	Date	Venue	Opponent	Result	Score F–A	Scorers	Attendance
LCC 1	22 October 1923	H	Millwall	L	1–2	Dobinson	3,000

== Squad ==
Position	Nationality	Name	Third Division South		FA Cup		Total	
Position	Nationality	Name	Apps	Goals	Apps	Goals	Apps	Goals
GK	ENG	Len Hill	37		1		38	
GK	ENG	Bill Field	3				3	
GK	ENG	Frank Drabble	2				2	
DF	ENG	Bill Pierce	24				24	
DF	ENG	George Harris						
DF	ENG	Ernie Symes						
DF	WAL	Reg John	36				36	
DF	ENG	John Thompson						
DF	ENG	Ben Marsden	21	3			21	3
DF	ENG	Frank Knowles	13				13	
DF	ENG	Harrison Fenwick						
DF	ENG	John Lillie						
DF	SCO	Ken Bain	30		1		31	
DF	ENG	Lyle Waugh	4				4	
DF	ENG	George Hart	4				4	
MF	ENG	Charlie Brown						
MF	ENG	Bob Bolam						
MF	ENG	Bill Hurst	2				2	
MF	ENG	John Vigrass	31		1		32	
MF	SCO	Jimmy Cameron	24		1		25	
MF	ENG	Shirley Abbott	12				12	
FW	ENG	Jimmy Birch	37	8	1		38	8
FW	ENG	Harry Johnson	14	3			14	3
FW	ENG	Ewart Ford						
FW	ENG	Jimmy Moore						
FW	ENG	Arthur Wood	19				19	
FW	ENG	Harry Brown						
FW	ENG	Harry Hart						
FW	ENG	Arthur Davis	27	8	1		28	8
FW	ENG	Ernie Butler	12		1		13	
FW	ENG	Dick Parker	35	14	1	1	36	15
FW	ENG	Jimmy Keen	31		1		32	
FW	ENG	Harry Dobinson	2				2	
FW	ENG	George Benson	18				18	
FW	ENG	Jimmy Robinson	5	1			5	1
FW	ENG	Billy Waller	2				2	
FW	ENG	William Goodman	1				1	
FW	ENG	Dick Oxley	16				16	

== Transfers in ==
Name	from	Date	Fee
Cooper, Charlie	Portsmouth	1 July 1923	
Lyle Waugh	Bedlington United	4 July 1923	
Bill Pierce	Bedlington United	8 July 1923	
Jimmy Cameron	Hearts	17 July 1923	
Clayton, Horace *	Brentford	July1923	
Noble, H *	Hornsey	Aug1923	
West, Thomas *	Hampstead Town	Aug1923	
Dick Oxley	Southport	23 August 1923	
Bill Pierce	Bedlington United	23 August 1923	
Ashford, Herbert	Notts County	14 September 1923	
Arthur Wood	Newport	14 September 1923	
Alford, B *	Southall	3 October 1923	
Jimmy Robinson	Nunhead	23 October 1923	
Lewis, Tommy *	Ilford	27 October 1923	
Mills, G *	Millwall United	Jan1924	
Harry Johnson	Southampton	14 February 1924	
Frank Knowles	Newport	22 February 1924	
Frank Drabble	Southport	23 February 1924	
Billy Waller	Scunthorpe	28 February 1924	
Harrison Fenwick	Shildon	12 May 1924	
Harry Brown	Shildon	12 May 1924	
George Harris	Notts County	16 May 1924	Free
Sambrook, Jack	Stockport	16 May 1924	
Ernie Symes	Aberdare Athletic	20 May 1924	
John Thompson	Yeovil & Petters U	20 May 1924	
Gibbon, Tommy	Luton	25 May 1924	
Jimmy Moore	Halifax	25 May 1924	
Charlie Brown	Southampton	25 May 1924	
Robert Bolam	South Shields	30 May 1924	
John Lillie	Liverpool	2 June 1924	
Ewart Ford	Hinckley U	6 June 1924	

== Transfers out ==
Name	from	Date	Fee	Date	To	Fee
Lane, Harry *	Charlton	17 June 1922		cs 1923		
Rance, Charlie	Derby	21 September 1922		cs 1923	Retired	
Ferrari, Fred *	Barking Town	20 October 1922		cs 1923	Barking Town	
Leach, Jimmy	Aston Villa	3 July 1922		cs 1923	Retired	
Wallace, John	Rotherham County	2 September 1922		cs 1923		
Hawkins, Alfred *	Grays Athletic	9 June 1922		cs 1923		
Thomas, David *		22 August 1922		cs 1923		
Edgley, Harry	Aston Villa	18 June 1921		July 1923	Stockport	Free
Watts, Fred	Royal Marines	Apr1920		July 1923	Yeovil & Petters U	
Burnham, Jack	Brighton	30 May 1921		July 1923	Durham City	
Gardner, Bill	Spennymoor U	26 March 1923		July 1923	Ashington	
Ashby, H *	Tooting Town	Aug1922		Aug 1923	Tunbridge Wells R	
Grimsdell, Ernie	Guildford U	21 June 1922		Aug 1923	Chatham	
Harry Hart	Folkestone	2 June 1922		Aug 1923	Mardy	Free
Alf Thompson	Guildford U	17 June 1922		Aug 1923	Gillingham	
Ashford, Herbert	Notts County	14 September 1923		Nov 1923	Ayr U	
Lewis, Tommy *	Ilford	27 October 1923		Nov 1923	Ilford	
Jimmy Robinson	Nunhead	23 October 1923		Jan 1924	Nunhead	
Arthur Davis	Aston Villa	21 May 1922	Free	Feb 1924	Notts County	£1,650
George Benson	Stalybridge Celtic	28 June 1923		Feb 1924	Port Vale	
Frank Drabble	Southport	23 February 1924		May 1924	Retired	
Ken Bain	Clackmannan	23 August 1921		May 1924		Free
Cooper, Charlie	Portsmouth	1 July 1923		May 1924		Free
Allison, Thomas	Washington Colliery	5 April 1923		May 1924		Free
Moiser, Gilbert *	Wombwell	8 May 1923		May 1924	Leytonstone	
Mason, John	South Shields	28 June 1923		May 1924		
Dick Oxley	Southport	23 August 1923		May 1924	Northampton	
John Vigrass	Leek Alexandra	8 August 1921		June 1924	Macclesfield	Free
Noble, H *	Hornsey	Aug1923		cs 1924		
West, Thomas *	Hampstead Town	Aug1923		cs 1924		
William Goodman	Northfleet U	25 August 1922		cs 1924	Northfleet U	Free
Harry Dobinson	Burnley	15 June 1923		cs 1924	Thornley Albion	Free
Clayton, Horace *	Brentford	July1923		cs 1924	Summerstown	
Alford, B *	Southall	3 October 1923		cs 1924		
Mills, G *	Millwall United	Jan1924		cs 1924		
Cameron, Jimmy	Hearts	17 July 1923		cs 1924	Indiana Flooring (USA) Free	
Waller, Billy	Scunthorpe	28 February 1924		cs 1924		Free
