= 1921–22 Queens Park Rangers F.C. season =

English football club season

Queens Park Rangers
1921–22 season
- Chairman: J. H. Fielding
- Manager: Ned Liddell
- Stadium: Loftus Road
- Third Division South: 5th
- FA Cup: 1st round
- Top goalscorer: League: Jimmy Birch 17; All: Jimmy Birch 17
- Highest home attendance: 18,000 (27 August 1921) Vs Swindon Town,(26 December 1921) Vs Southampton, (6/5/1922) vs Plymouth Argyle
- Lowest home attendance: 4,000 (22 April 1922) Vs Merthyr Town
- Average home league attendance: 11,143
- Biggest win: 6–1 (4/2/1922) vs Millwall
- Biggest defeat: 1–5 (22 October 1921) Vs Brentford
Home colours	Away colours

The 1921–22 Queens Park Rangers season was the club's 31st season of existence and their 2nd season in the newly founded Football League Third Division. QPR finished 5th in the league, and were eliminated by Arsenal in the first round of the 1920–21 FA Cup.

== League standings ==
Pos	Team	Pld	W	D	L	GF	GA	GAv	Pts
3	Portsmouth	42	18	17	7	62	39	1.590	53
4	Luton Town	42	22	8	12	64	35	1.829	52
5	Queens Park Rangers	42	18	13	11	53	44	1.205	49
6	Swindon Town	42	16	13	13	72	60	1.200	45
7	Watford	42	13	18	11	54	48	1.125	44

=== Results ===
QPR scores given first

Win Draw Loss

=== Third Division South ===
Date	Venue	Opponent	Result	Score F–A	Scorers	Attendance	League Position
27 August 1921	H	Swindon Town	D	0–0		18,000	8
29 August 1921	A	Newport County	W	1–0	Birch	8,000	3
3 September 1921	A	Swindon Town	L	0–2		10,000	12
5 September 1921	H	Newport County	W	2–1	Smith, Birch	7,000	10
10 September 1921	A	Norwich City	D	0–0		9,000	8
17 September 1921	H	Norwich City	W	2–0	Gregory, Smith (pen)	15,000	7
24 September 1921	A	Reading	W	1–0	Gregory	12,000	7
1 October 1921	H	Reading	D	1–1	Birch	16,000	7
8 October 1921	A	Bristol Rovers	D	1–1	Smith	10,000	7
15 October 1921	H	Bristol Rovers	L	1–2	O'Brien	10,000	7
22 October 1921	A	Brentford	L	1–5	Birch	13,836	10
29 October 1921	H	Brentford	D	1–1	Smith	15,000	10
5 November 1921	A	Aberdare Athletic	L	2–4	Birch, Gregory	12,000	13
12 November 1921	H	Aberdare Athletic	W	1–0	Knight	12,000	11
19 November 1921	A	Brighton & Hove Albion	L	1–2	Faulkner	9,000	12
26 November 1921	H	Brighton & Hove Albion	W	3–0	O'Brien, Birch 2	12,000	8
3 December 1921	A	Watford	D	2–2	Gregory, Birch	8,000	8
10 December 1921	H	Watford	D	1–1	Birch	15,000	8
17 December 1921	A	Charlton Athletic	D	1–1	Chandler	10,000	7
24 December 1921	H	Charlton Athletic	W	3–1	O'Brien, Smith, Chandler	12,000	6
26 December 1921	H	Southampton	D	2–2	Birch, Chandler	18,000	6
27 December 1921	A	Southampton	D	1–1	Birch	20,940	5
31 December 1921	H	Northampton Town	W	4–0	Birch 2, Smith 2	10,000	5
14 January 1922	A	Northampton Town	L	0–1		6,000	5
21 January 1922	H	Gillingham	W	1–0	Chandler	5,000	5
28 January 1922	A	Gillingham	W	2–1	Smith 2	10,000	5
4 February 1922	H	Millwall	W	6–1	Edgley, Smith, Grant, Birch, Chandler 2	6,000	5
11 February 1922	A	Millwall	D	0–0		22,000	5
18 February 1922	H	Exeter City	W	2–1	Chandler, Gregory	10,000	5
25 February 1922	A	Exeter City	W	1–0	Edgley	7,000	5
4 March 1922	H	Swansea Town	W	1–0	Birch	6,000	5
11 March 1922	A	Swansea Town	L	0–1		13,000	5
18 March 1922	A	Southend United	W	2–1	Edgley, Birch	7,000	5
25 March 1922	H	Southend United	W	1–0	Edgley	12,000	5
1 April 1922	A	Portsmouth	L	0–1		10,615	5
8 April 1922	H	Portsmouth	D	1–1	Chandler	10,000	5
14 April 1922	H	Luton Town	W	1–0	Gregory	11,000	4
15 April 1922	A	Merthyr Town	L	0–2		4,000	5
17 April 1922	A	Luton Town	L	1–3	Birch	15,000	5
22 April 1922	H	Merthyr Town	D	0–0		4,000	5
29 April 1922	A	Plymouth Argyle	L	0–4		19,000	5
6 May 1922	H	Plymouth Argyle	W	2–0	Eastwood (og), Edgley	18,000	5

=== FA Cup ===
Round	Date	Venue	Opponent	Result	Score F–A	Scorers	Attendance
Sixth round qualifying	Saturday 17 December 1921			BYE			
First round	7 January 1922	A	Arsenal (First Division)	D	0–0		31,000
First round Replay	11 January 192	H	Arsenal (First Division)	L	1–2	Smith	21,411

=== London Professional Charity Fund ===
Date	Venue	Opponent	Result	Score F–A	Scorers	Attendance
29 September 1921	H	Brentford	W	2–0	Smith, Clayton	5,000

=== London Challenge Cup ===
Round	Date	Venue	Opponent	Result	Score F–A	Scorers	Attendance
One	17 October 1921	H	Custom House	W	3–0	Chandler, Read, Gregory	2,000
Two	31 October 1921	A	Arsenal	L	0–2		5,000

=== Benefit Match for Joseph Wingrove’s Widow ===
Date	Venue	Opponent	Result	Score F–A	Scorers	Attendance
4 May 1922	H	Maidstone				

== Squad ==
Position	Nationality	Name	Third Division South		FA Cup		Total	
Position	Nationality	Name	Apps	Goals	Apps	Goals	Apps	Goals
GK	ENG	Len Hill	36		2		38	
GK	ENG	Herbert Lock	6				6	
DF	WAL	Reg John	13		1		14	
DF	ENG	Ben Marsden	37		2		39	
DF	ENG	Fred Blackman	20				20	
DF	SCO	Ken Bain	25		2		27	
DF		Charlie Thompson	1				1	
DF		Sid Bailey	1				1	
MF	ENG	John Vigrass	3				3	
MF	ENG	Jack Gregory	40	6			40	6
MF	ENG	George Grant	27	1	1		28	1
MF	ENG	Horace Clayton	3				3	
MF	ENG	Mick O'Brien	30	3	2		32	3
MF	ENG	Herbert Ashford	5				5	
MF	ENG	Albert Read	21				21	
MF	ENG	Jack Burnham	27		2		29	
FW	ENG	Jimmy Birch	38	17	2		40	17
FW	ENG	Harry Hart						
FW	ENG	Arthur Davis						
FW	ENG	Jack Smith	33	10	2	1	35	11
FW	SCO	Roy Faulkner	17	1	2		19	1
FW	ENG	Arthur Chandler	30	8	2		32	8
FW	ENG	Alex Ramsay	6				6	
FW	ENG	Harry Edgley	36	5	2		38	5
FW	ENG	Jack Bradshaw	5				5	
FW	ENG	Freddy Knight	2	1			2	1

== Transfers in ==
Name	from	Date	Fee
Charlie Thompson	Newcastle	12 July 1921	
Prentice, Robert	Arcadians (Rsa)	21 July 1921	
Herbert Lock	Glasgow Rangers	29 July 1921	Free
Maidment, Jimmy *	Robert Thompson's	Aug 1921	
Baines, Alexander		6 August 1921	
John Vigrass	Leek Alexandra	8 August 1921	
Ken Bain	Clackmannan	23 August 1921	
Pusey, C *	Harlesden Town	24 August 1921	
Mallett, A E *	Brentford	24 August 1921	
Gilbert, Bert *	Harlesden Town	24 August 1921	
Luck, Charles *	Southend Corinthians	7 October 1921	
Baxter, Harry *	R.A.F.	8 November 1921	
Freddy Knight	Botwell Mission	11 November 1921	
Knight, Reg *	Botwell Mission	14 November 1921	
Cadwell, Albert *	Nunhead	2 March 1922	
Arthur Davis	Aston Villa	21 May 1922	Free
Gregory, Clarence	Sunderland	31 May 1922	£150
Harry Hart	Folkestone	2 June 1922	
Hawkins, Alfred *	Grays Athletic	9 June 1922	
Lane, Harry *	Charlton	17 June 1922	
Alf Thompson	Guildford U	17 June 1922	
Grimsdell, Ernie	Guildford U	21 June 1922	

== Transfers out ==
Name	from	Date	Fee	Date	To	Fee
Mould, William *		14 July 1920		cs 1921		
Rippengill, Herbert *	Kings Lynn	cs1920		cs 1921		
Armitage, S *		cs1920		cs 1921		
Payne, T *		cs1920		cs 1921		
Slader, Charles *		cs1920		cs 1921	Wimbledon	
Dix, Harry *	Norwich	4 February 1921		cs 1921	The Royal Artillery	
Grimsdell, Ernie	Watford	14 August 1920		July 1921	Guildford U	
Cain, Thomas	Dublin Bohemians	29 August 1919		July 1921	Guildford U	
Manning, Jack	Rotherham County	16 June 1920		July 1921	Boston	
Wingrove, Joe	Uxbridge	Mar1913		September 1921	Maidstone U	
Hunt, Alfred	Clapton Orient	14 April 1921		September 1921	Scotland	
McGovern, Tom	Brentford	Apr1920		September 1921	Treherbert	
Gould, Harry *	Metropolitan Police	cs1919		October? 1921	Metropolitan Police	
Jarvis, Albert	Bargoed	20 September 1920		October 1921	Rhymney	
Pidgeon, Harry	Gnome Athletic	Apr1920		November 1921	Southend U	
Freddy Knight	Botwell Mission	11 November 1921		December 1921	Botwell Mission	
Knight, Reg *	Botwell Mission	14 November 1921		December 1921	Botwell Mission	
Mick O'Brien	South Shields	14 May 1920		March 1922	Leicester	£1,200
