= 1924–25 Queens Park Rangers F.C. season =

English football club season

Queens Park Rangers
1924–25 season
- Manager: Will Wood appointed secretary-manager 3 Sep, Bob Hewison From 1 Apr
- Stadium: Loftus Road
- Third Division South: 19th
- FA Cup: 1st Round
- London Challenge Cup: Semi-final
- Top goalscorer: League: Harry Johnson 10; All: Colin Myers, Harry Johnson 10
- Highest home attendance: 12,000 (25 October 1924) Vs Millwall
- Lowest home attendance: 4,000 (27 December 1924) Vs Newport County
- Average home league attendance: 8,943
- Biggest win: 4 – 1 (20 December 1924) Vs Aberdare Athletic
- Biggest defeat: 0–5 (26 December 1924) Vs Norwich City & (1/4/1925) Vs Bristol City
Home colours	Away colours

The 1924–25 Queens Park Rangers season was the club's 34th season of existence and their 5th season in the Football League Third Division. QPR finished 19th in the league, and were eliminated in the first round of the 1924–25 FA Cup.

== League standings ==
Pos	Team	Pld	W	D	L	GF	GA	GAv	Pts	Qualification
17	Bristol Rovers	42	12	13	17	42	49	0.857	37	
18	Aberdare Athletic	42	14	9	19	54	67	0.806	37	
19	Queens Park Rangers	42	14	8	20	42	63	0.667	36	
20	Bournemouth & Boscombe Athletic	42	13	8	21	40	58	0.690	34	
21	Brentford	42	9	7	26	38	91	0.418	25	Re-elected

=== Results ===
QPR scores given first

Win Draw Loss

=== Third Division South ===
Date	Venue	Opponent	Result	Score F–A	Scorers	Attendance	League Position
30 August 1924	A	Newport County	D	0–0		10,000	14
3 September 1924	H	Watford	D	0–0		9,000	14
6 September 1924	H	Bristol Rovers	L	1–2	Brown, H.	12,000	18
10 September 1924	A	Watford	L	0–1		6,000	21
13 September 1924	A	Exeter City	W	3–1	Brown, H., Crompton (og), Moore	7,000	15
17 September 1924	A	Southend United	L	0–1		8,000	18
20 September 1924	H	Swansea Town	D	0–0		9,800	17
24 September 1924	A	Plymouth Argyle	L	0–1		5,000	18
27 September 1924	A	Reading	L	1–2	Hart	8,181	20
4 October 1924	H	Merthyr Town	D	1–1	Birch	7,000	19
11 October 1924	A	Brentford	W	1–0	Brown, H.	8,000	17
18 October 1924	A	Charlton Athletic	L	0–2		5,000	19
25 October 1924	H	Millwall	D	0–0		12,000	19
1 November 1924	A	Luton Town	L	0–3		4,000	21
8 November 1924	H	Gillingham	D	1–1	Marsden (pen)	9,000	21
15 November 1924	A	Swindon Town	L	3–5	Johnson, Myers 2	7,000	21
22 November 1924	H	Brighton & Hove Albion	W	2–0	Johnson 2	9,000	20
6 December 1924	H	Bristol City	W	3–0	Moore 2, Johnson	6,000	19
20 December 1924	H	Aberdare Athletic	W	4–1	Johnson, Birch 2, Myers	9,000	16
25 December 1924	H	Norwich City	L	1–2	Ogley	6,000	18
26 December 1924	A	Norwich City	L	0–5		12,000	19
27 December 1924	H	Newport County	W	4–3	Moore, Johnson, Ford 2	4,000	17
17 January 1925	H	Exeter City	L	1–4	Moore	10,000	18
24 January 1925	A	Swansea Town	L	0–2		6,000	19
31 January 1925	H	Reading	W	1–0	Johnson	8,000	18
7 February 1925	A	Merthyr Town	W	3–2	Johnson 2, Ford	5,000	17
14 February 1925	H	Brentford	W	1–0	Brown, C.	10,000	15
21 February 1925	H	Charlton Athletic	D	0–0		10,000	16
28 February 1925	A	Millwall	L	0–3		16,000	16
7 March 1925	H	Luton Town	W	2–1	Hurst 2	7,000	16
14 March 1925	A	Gillingham	L	0–1		6,000	17
18 March 1925	A	Bristol Rovers	L	0–3		3,000	17
21 March 1925	H	Bournemouth & Boscombe Athletic	L	0–2		7,000	19
28 March 1925	A	Brighton & Hove Albion	L	0–5		7,000	20
4 April 1925	H	Plymouth Argyle	L	0–1		11,000	20
11 April 1925	A	Bristol City	L	0–5		9,000	20
13 April 1925	H	Northampton Town	W	2–0	Johnson, Birch	8,000	20
14 April 1925	A	Northampton Town	L	0–1		8,000	20
18 April 1925	H	Swindon Town	W	1–0	Pierce (pen)	9,000	20
22 April 1925	A	Bournemouth & Boscombe Athletic	W	2–0	Hurst, John	8,000	19
25 April 1925	A	Aberdare Athletic	D	1–1	Birch	4,000	19
2 May 1925	H	Southend United	W	3–1	Birch, Ogley (pen), Hurst	7,000	19

=== FA Cup ===
Round	Date	Venue	Opponent	Result	Score F–A	Scorers	Attendance
FACup Q5	29/11/24	H	Clapton (Second Division)	D	4–4	Myers 4	5,000
FAC Q5 R	4/12/24	A	Clapton (Second Division)	W	2–0	Birch 2	4,700
FACup Q6	13/12/24	H	Charlton(Third Division South)	D	1–1	Myers (pen)	13,000
FACup Q6 Rep	18/12/24	A	Charlton(Third Division South)	W	2–1	Myers, Birch	5,000
FACup 1	08/01/24	H	Stockport (Second Division)	L	1–3	Myers	19,640

=== London Professional Charity Fund ===
Date	Venue	Opponent	Result	Score F–A	Scorers	Attendance
17 November 1924	A	Brentford	W	2–0	Bolam, Hurst	

=== London Challenge Cup ===
Round	Date	Venue	Opponent	Result	Score F–A	Scorers	Attendance
LCC 1	27 October 1924	A	Great Eastern Railway	W	5–2	Wood 3, Johnson 2	
LCC 2	10 November 1924	H	Brentford	W	2–0	Marsden (pen), Johnson	1,500
LCC SF	24 November 1924	Stamford Bridge	West Ham	D	1–1	Myers	
LCCSFRep	8 December 1924	Homerton	West Ham	L	0–3		4,000

== Squad ==
Position	Nationality	Name	Div 3 South Appearances	Div 3 South Goals	F A Cup Appearances	F A Cup Goals	Total Appearances	Total Goals
GK	(England)	George Hebden						
GK	(England)	Len Hill	15		5		20	
GK	(England)	Bill Field	22				22	
GK	(England)	Jack Wicks	5				5	
DF	(England)	Bill Pierce	22	1	5		27	1
DF	(England)	Sid Sweetman	8				8	
DF	(England)	George Harris	24		5		29	
DF	(England)	Jack Middleton						
DF	(England)	Ernie Symes	8				8	
DF	(Wales)	Reg John	21	1	4		25	1
DF	(England)	John Thompson	9		1		10	
DF	(England)	Charlie Campbell						
DF	(England)	Ben Marsden	18	1			18	1
DF	(England)	Frank Knowles	22		5		27	
DF	(England)	Reggie Dand	1				1	
DF	(England)	Harrison Fenwick	19				19	
DF	(England)	John Lillie	3				3	
DF	(Wales)	Billy Evans	17				17	
MF	(Scotland)	Hugh Richmond						
MF	(England)	Bill Pigg	2				2	
MF	(England)	Harry Hirst						
MF	(England)	Charlie Brown	40	1	5		45	1
MF	(England)	Bill Young	1				1	
MF	(England)	Colin Myers	17	3	5	7	22	10
MF	(England)	Bob Bolam	2				2	
MF	(England)	Bill Ogley	36	2	5		41	2
MF	(England)	Bill Hurst	8	4			8	4
FW	(England)	George Goddard						
FW	(England)	Dick Burgess						
FW	(England)	Jimmy Birch	36	6	5	3	41	9
FW	(England)	Harry Johnson	27	10	5		32	10
FW	(England)	Ewart Ford	37	3	5		42	3
FW	(England)	Jimmy Moore	26	5			26	5
FW	(England)	Arthur Wood	1				1	
FW	(England)	Harry Brown	13	3			13	3
FW	(England)	Harry Hart	2	1			2	1

== Transfers in ==
Name	from	Date	Fee
Bill Ogley	Newport	18 July 1924	
Reggie Dand	Reading	10 July 1924	
Bill Pigg	Ashington	31 July 1924	
Hart, Harry	Mardy	31 July 1924	
Billy Evans	Southend	6 September 1924	
George Goddard	Gomshall	30 October 1924	
Colin Myers	Northampton	22 October 1924	£1,500
Jack Wicks	Reading	24 October 1924	
Avey, Victor *		19 November 1924	
Sweetman, Sid *	Hampstead Town	8 December 1924	
Bill Young	Whitburn	11 February 1925	
Harry Hirst	Preston	4 May 1925	Free
Hugh Richmond	Coventry	8 May 1925	
Charlie Campbell	Pembroke Dock	6 May 1925	
Jack Middleton	Leicester	5 May 1925	
George Hebden	Leicester	5 May 1925	
Kipping, Jim *	Wycombe Wanderers	8 May 1925	
Toseland, Ernie *	Higham Town	28 May 1925	
Dick Burgess	Aberdare Athletic	11 June 1925	
Joe Spottiswood	Swansea Town	14 June 1925	£400

== Transfers out ==
Name	from	Date	Fee	Date	To	Fee
Noble, H *	Hornsey	Aug1923		cs 1924		
West, Thomas *	Hampstead Town	Aug1923		cs 1924		
Goodman, William	Northfleet U	25 August 1922		cs 1924	Northfleet U	Free
Dobinson, Harry	Burnley	15 June 1923		cs 1924	Thornley Albion	Free
Clayton, Horace *	Brentford	July1923		cs 1924	Summerstown	
Alford, B *	Southall	3 October 1923		cs 1924		
Mills, G *	Millwall United	Jan1924		cs 1924		
Cameron, Jimmy	Hearts	17 July 1923		cs 1924	Indiana Flooring (USA) Free	
Waller, Billy	Scunthorpe	28 February 1924		cs 1924		Free
Butler, Ernie	Ebbw Vale	3 July 1922		July 1924	Hartlepools U	Free
Parker, Dick	Wallsend	1 August 1922		July 1924	Millwall	
Keen, Jimmy	Newcastle	24 May 1923		July 1924	Hull	
Sambrook, Jack	Stockport	16 May 1924		July 1924	Southport	
Hart, George	Bedlington United	25 May 1923		August 1924	Durham City	Free
Abbott, Shirley	Portsmouth	21 May 1923	£100	August 1924	Chesterfield	
Waugh, Lyle	Bedlington United	4 July 1923		September 1924	Spennymoor U	Free
Tommy Gibbon	Luton	25 May 1924		October 1924	Mid Rhondda	Free
George Goddard *	Gomshall	30 October 1924		December 1924	Redhill	
Jack Wicks	Reading	24 October 1924		May 1925	Wolverton Town	
Frank Knowles	Newport	22 February 1924		May 1925	Sandbach Ramblers	
Bill Hurst	Derby	8 June 1923	Free	May 1925		
Colin Myers	Northampton	22 October 1924	£1,500	May 1925	Exeter	
Arthur Wood	Newport	14 September 1923		May 1925	Retired	
Len Hill	Southend	3 May 1920		June 1925	Southampton	
Harry Hart	Mardy	31 July 1924		June 1925	Grays Thurrock U	
Billy Evans	Southend	6 September 1924		cs 1925		
Reggie Dand	Reading	10 July 1924		cs 1925	Ashford Railway Works	
