= 1900 in association football =

The following are the association football events of the year 1900 throughout the world.

== Events ==
- 28 January: German Football Association founded in Leipzig.
- Germany: 1. FC Nürnberg, Alemannia Aachen, 1. FC Kaiserslautern and FC Bayern Munich is founded.
- Italy: S.S. Lazio is founded.
- Netherlands: NEC Nijmegen and Ajax Amsterdam is founded.
- Brazil: AA Ponte Preta and Sport Club Rio Grande are founded.

== National League Champions ==
=== South America ===
Nation	Tournament	Winner	Runner-up	Title
Argentina	Primera Division	English High School	Lomas	1st
Uruguay	Primera Division	CURCC	Albion	1st

=== Europe ===
Nation	Tournament	Winner	Runner-up	Title	Previous Title Won
Belgium	First Division	Racing Bruxelles (won 11-1 in playoff)	FC Brugeois	2nd	1897
England	First Division	Aston Villa	Sheffield	5th	1899
Ireland	Irish League	Celtic	Linfield	1st	None
Netherlands	Football League Championship	HVV Den Haag (won 1-0 after a playoff replay)	Victoria Wageningen	3rd	1896
Scotland	Scottish League	Rangers	Celtic	3rd	1899

== Domestic Cups ==
=== Asia ===
Nation	Tournament	Winner	Score	Runner-up	Venue	Title
India	Durand Cup	South Wales Borderers	2-0	East Lancashire Regiment	Annadale	1st

=== Europe ===
Nation	Tournament	Winner	Score	Runner-up	Venue	Title	Previous Title Won
England	FA Cup	Bury	4-0	Southampton	Crystal Palace	1st	None
France	French Football Championship	Le Havre	1-0	Club Français	Tourcoing	2nd	1899
Ireland	Irish Cup	Cliftonville	2-1	Bohemians	Grosvenor Park	4th	1897
Italy	Football Championship	Genoa	3-1 (after extra time)	Torinese	Turin	3rd	1899
Netherlands	KVNB	CVV Velocitas	3-1 (after extra time)	Ajax Leiden	Schuttersveld Crooswijk, Rotterdam	1st	None
Scotland	Scottish Cup	Celtic	4-3	Queen's Park	Ibrox Park	3rd	1899
Sweden	Svenska Mästerskapet	AIK	1-0	Örgryte IS	Lindarängen	1st	None
Switzerland	Swiss Serie A	Grasshopper	2-0	Bern	Aarau	1st	None
Wales	Welsh Cup	Aberystwyth Town	3-0	Druids	The Cunnings	1st	None

== International tournaments ==
- 1900 British Home Championship (3 February – 7 April 1900)

Scotland

- Olympic Games in Paris, France (20–28 October 1900)
  1. (United Kingdom) Great Britain
  2. France
  3. Belgium

== Births ==
- 1 January – Mieczysław Batsch, Polish footballer (died 1977)
- 1 February – Walter Picken, English footballer (died 1981)
- 30 March – Santos Urdinarán, Uruguayan footballer (died 1979)
- 20 May – Lorenzo Fernández, Uruguayan footballer (died 1973)
- 9 June – Alberto Merciai, Italian footballer (died 1971)
- 1 September – Pedro Cea, Uruguayan footballer (died 1970)
- 19 September – Eddie Croak, American footballer (died 1984)
- 26 October – William Fall, English professional footballer (died 1965)
- 27 October – Clarence Gregory, English professional footballer (died 1975)
