= 1920–21 Queens Park Rangers F.C. season =

English football club season

Queens Park Rangers
1920–21 season
- Chairman: J. H. Fielding
- Manager: Ned Liddell
- Stadium: Loftus Road
- Third Division: 3rd
- FA Cup: 2nd round
- London Challenge Cup: Semi-final
- Top goalscorer: League: Jack Smith 18; All: Jack Smith 20
- Highest home attendance: 25,000 (27 December 1920) Vs Brentford
- Lowest home attendance: 4,000 (17 February 1921) vs Norwich City
- Average home league attendance: 14,143
- Biggest win: 4 – 0 (11/12/1920) Vs Brighton & Hove Albion, (17 March 1921) vsPlymouth Argyle
- Biggest defeat: 0–3 (25 March 1921) Vs Bristol Rovers
Home colours	Away colours

The 1920–21 Queens Park Rangers season was the club's 33rd season of existence and their first season in the newly founded Football League Third Division. QPR finished 3rd in the inaugural season, and made the second round of the 1920–21 FA Cup.

== League standings ==
Pos	Team	Pld	W	D	L	GF	GA	GR	Pts	Promotion
1	Crystal Palace (C, P)	42	24	11	7	70	34	2.059	59	Promotion to the Second Division
2	Southampton	42	19	16	7	64	28	2.286	54	
3	Queens Park Rangers	42	22	9	11	61	32	1.906	53	
4	Swindon Town	42	21	10	11	73	49	1.490	52	
5	Swansea Town	42	18	15	9	56	45	1.244	51	

Source: fchd.info
(C) Champions; (P) Promoted

=== Results ===
QPR scores given first

Win Draw Loss

=== Third Division ===
Date	Venue	Opponent	Result	Score F–A	Scorers	Attendance	League Position
28 August 1920	H	Watford	L	1–2	Birch	20,000	15
2 September 1920	H	Northampton Town	L	1–2	Birch	14,000	22
4 September 1920	A	Watford	W	2–0	Birch 2	10,466	18
6 September 1920	A	Northampton Town	W	3–0	Gregory, Smith, Middlemiss	6,000	7
11 September 1920	H	Reading	W	2–0	Gregory, Smith	15,000	4
18 September 1920	A	Reading	D	0–0		9,000	8
25 September 1920	H	Luton Town	W	4–1	Birch 2, Gregory (pen), Mitchell	20,000	6
2 October 1920	A	Luton Town	L	1–2	Birch	10,000	8
9 October 1920	H	Southend United	W	2–0	Smith, Dorsett (og)	20,000	6
16 October 1920	A	Southend United	L	0–1		8,000	8
23 October 1920	A	Swansea Town	W	3–1	Gregory, Birch, Manning	16,000	7
30 October 1920	H	Swansea Town	D	1–1	Manning	18,000	7
6 November 1920	A	Southampton	D	2–2	Manning, Gregory	15,000	9
13 November 1920	H	Southampton	D	0–0		20,000	7
20 November 1920	A	Grimsby Town	L	1–2	Smith	8,000	8
27 November 1920	H	Grimsby Town	W	2–0	Smith, Gregory	10,000	7
4 December 1920	A	Brighton & Hove Albion	L	1–2	Gregory	9,000	8
11 December 1920	H	Brighton & Hove Albion	W	4–0	Smith 3, Birch	7,000	7
18 December 1920	H	Crystal Palace	W	3–0	Birch 2, Gregory	18,000	6
25 December 1920	A	Brentford	W	2–0	Smith 2	16,379	4
27 December 1920	H	Brentford	W	1–0	Birch	25,000	3
1 January 1921	A	Crystal Palace	D	0–0		15,000	6
15 January 1921	A	Merthyr Town	L	1–3	Birch	15,000	6
22 January 1921	H	Merthyr Town	W	4–2	Gregory, Manning, Birch (pen), Smith	12,000	4
5 February 1921	A	Norwich City	L	0–2		9,000	5
12 February 1921	A	Plymouth Argyle	L	0–1		14,000	7
17 February 1921	H	Norwich City	W	2–0	Gregory, Birch	4,000	5
26 February 1921	A	Exeter City	W	1–0	Smith	10,000	4
5 March 1921	H	Exeter City	W	2–1	Gregory 2	15,000	4
12 March 1921	A	Millwall	D	0–0		20,000	4
17 March 1921	H	Plymouth Argyle	W	4–0	Smith 2, Gregory, Clayton	8,000	3
19 March 1921	H	Millwall	D	0–0		20,000	3
25 March 1921	A	Bristol Rovers	L	0–3		20,000	4
26 March 1921	H	Newport County	W	2–0	Mitchell, Smith	10,000	3
28 March 1921	H	Bristol Rovers	W	2–1	Mitchell, Smith	15,000	3
2 April 1921	A	Newport County	W	3–1	Smith, Chandler, Manning	10,000	4
9 April 1921	H	Gillingham	L	0–1		10,000	5
16 April 1921	A	Gillingham	W	2–1	Gregory, Smith	8,000	4
23 April 1921	H	Swindon Town	W	1–0	Chandler	12,000	4
30 April 1921	A	Swindon Town	W	1–0	Gregory	7,000	3
2 May 1921	H	Portsmouth	D	0–0		10,000	3
7 May 1921	A	Portsmouth	D	0–0		14,933	3

=== FA Cup ===
Round	Date	Venue	Opponent	Result	Score F–A	Scorers	Attendance
FACup 1	8 January 1921	H	Arsenal (First Division)	W	2–0	Chandler, Smith	20,000
FACup 2	29 January 1921	A	Burnley (First Division)	L	2–4	Smith, Birch	41,007

=== London Professional Charity Fund ===
Date	Venue	Opponent	Result	Score F–A	Scorers	Attendance
15 November 1920	A	Brentford	L	1–3	Smith (pen)	

=== London Challenge Cup ===
Round	Date	Venue	Opponent	Result	Score F–A	Scorers	Attendance
LCC 1	11 October 1920	H	Millwall	W	1–0	Chandler	3,000
LCC 2	1 November 1920	A	Wimbledon	W	2–0	Birch 2	4,000
LCCSF	21 February 1921	A	Crystal P	L	2–4	Chandler, Smith	10,000

== Squad ==
Position	Nationality	Name	Third Division		FA Cup		Total	
Position	Nationality	Name	Apps	Goals	Apps	Goals	Apps	Goals
GK	ENG	Len Hill	32		2		34	
GK	ENG	Harry Gould	2				2	
GK	ENG	Ted Price	7				7	
DF	WAL	Reg John	2				2	
DF	ENG	Ben Marsden	16				16	
DF	ENG	Joe Wingrove	24		2		26	
DF	ENG	Fred Blackman	22		1		23	
DF	ENG	Ernie Grimsdell	20		1		21	
MF	ENG	Jack Gregory	39	15	2		41	15
MF	ENG	George Grant	42		2		44	
MF	ENG	Horace Clayton	3	1			3	1
MF	ENG	Archie Mitchell	35	3	2		37	3
MF	ENG	John Baldock	1				1	
MF	IRE	Tom McGovern	2				2	
MF	ENG	Mick O'Brien	36		2		38	
MF	ENG	Herbert Ashford	5				5	
MF	ENG	Bert Middlemiss	16	1			16	1
FW	ENG	David Donald	22				22	
FW	ENG	Jimmy Birch	25	15	2	1	27	16
FW	ENG	Jack Smith	42	18	2	2	44	20
FW	SCO	Roy Faulkner	33				33	
FW	ENG	Jack Manning	22	5	2		24	5
FW	ENG	Arthur Chandler	12	2	2	1	14	3

== Transfers in ==
Name	from	Date	Fee
Rippengill, Herbert *	King's Lynn	cs1920	
Armitage, S *		cs1920	
Payne, T *		cs1920	
Slader, Charles *		cs1920	
Mould, William *		14 July 1920	
George Grant	Millwall	14 July 1920	
Ernie Grimsdell	Watford	14 August 1920	
Arthur Chandler	Handley Page	16 August 1920	
Reg John	Crystal P	28 August 1920	
Horace Clayton	Tufnell Park	10 August 1920	
Herbert Ashford	Brentford	28 August 1920	
Jarvis, Albert *	Bargoed	20 September 1920	
Dix, Harry *	Norwich	4 February 1921	
Toby, Charles *	Bostall Heath	March 1921	
Rumble, Edward *	Grays Athletic	15 Mar 1921	
Hunt, Alfred	Clapton Orient	14 Apr 1921	
Sid Bailey	Grays Athletic	21 Apr 1922	
Burnham, Jack	Brighton	30 May 1921	
Watson, Edward	Sunderland	30 May 1921	
Bell, Charlie	Barrow	30 May 1921	
Albert Read	Tufnell Park	30 May 1921	
Watson, Edward	Sunderland	30 May 1921	
Jack Burnham	Brighton	30 May 1921	
Alex Ramsay	Newcastle	10 June 1921	
Harry Edgley	Aston Villa	18 June 1921	
Jack Bradshaw	Aberdare Athletic	18 June 1921	

== Transfers out ==
Name	from	Date	Fee	Date	To	Fee
Berry, Fred	Rochdale	18 December 1919		cs 1920		
Olsen, C *		cs1919		cs 1920	Graysons	
Whyman, Alf	New Brompton	4 May 1909		cs 1920	Retired	
Poplett, John *	Shepherd's Bush	cs1919		cs 1920	Eastman's Dyeworks	
Chester, Albert	Tottenham	Oct 1921, 1919		cs 1920	Ramsgate	Free
Haggan, Isaac	Usworth Colliery	9 March 1920		July 1920	Houghton Rovers	
Draper, Billy		cs1913		Aug 1920	Reading	
Sutch, William		9 December 1919		Aug 1920	Sittingbourne	
Thompson, Billy	Haslingden	23 July 1912		Aug 1920	Newport	£250
Fox, George	Fulham	cs1917		Aug 1920	Chatham	
Lowe, Walter		Oct1919		Oct 1920	Rochdale	
Wilde, Joseph	Burnley	Aug 1920, 1912		Nov 1920	Llanelly	
Wodehouse, George *	Summerstown	Aug1919		Feb 1921	Ilford	
Price, Ted	Brentford	May 1920,1920		May 1921	Brentford	
Rumble, Edward *	Grays Athletic	15 Mar 1921		May 1921	Grays Athletic	
Donald, David	Watford	16 May 1914		May 1921	Ilkeston United	
Middlemiss, Bert	Tottenham	1 June 1920		May 1921	Retired	
Mitchell, Archie	Aston Villa	2 May 1907		June 1921	Brentford (Pl./Man.)	
Mould, William *		14 July 1920		cs 1921		
Rippengill, Herbert *	Kings Lynn	cs1920		cs 1921		
Armitage, S *		cs1920		cs 1921		
Payne, T *		cs1920		cs 1921		
Slader, Charles *		cs1920		cs 1921	Wimbledon	
Dix, Harry *	Norwich	4 February 1921		cs 1921	The Royal Artillery	
