= 1919–20 Queens Park Rangers F.C. season =

English football club season

Queens Park Rangers
1919–20 season
- Chairman: J. H. Fielding
- Manager: James Howie
- Stadium: Loftus Road
- Southern League Division One: 6th
- FA Cup: 1st Round
- London Challenge Cup: Semi Finals
- Top goalscorer: League: Jack Smith (17); All: Jack Smith (17)
- Highest home attendance: 15,000 (25 December 1919) Vs Brentford
- Lowest home attendance: 6,000 (8 September 1919) Vs Plymouth, (20 September 1919) Vs Luton, (25 September 1919) Vs Southend
- Biggest win: 7–1 Vs Bristol R (3 January 1920)
- Biggest defeat: 0–4 Vs Cardiff (28 February 1920)
Home colours	Away colours

The 1919–20 Queens Park Rangers season was the club's 32nd season of existence and their first season back in the Southern First League after their short period of play in the wartime football league The Football Combination. QPR finished 6th in the league during the campaign.

== Season summary ==
In the first football league season following World War One, QPR competed in their final season in the Southern League. There were no promotions or relegations between divisions at the end of the season as all of the clubs in Division One bar Cardiff City were elected to the new Division Three of the Football League. For the 1919–20 season, having played on no fewer than eleven grounds, Rangers took over the Loftus Road stadium of Shepherds Bush FC and this has remained their home ever since.

In the FA Cup Rangers were knocked out by eventual Cup Winners Aston Villa.

== League standings ==
Pos	Team	Pld	W	D	L	GF	GA	GR	Pts	Qualification
4	Cardiff City	42	18	17	7	70	43	1.628	53	Elected to the Football League Second Division
5	Plymouth Argyle	42	20	10	12	57	29	1.966	50	Elected to the new Football League Third Division
6	Queens Park Rangers	42	18	10	14	62	50	1.240	46	Elected to the new Football League Third Division
7	Reading	42	16	13	13	51	43	1.186	45	Elected to the new Football League Third Division
8	Southampton	42	18	8	16	72	63	1.143	44	Elected to the new Football League Third Division

Rules for classification: The system of using goal average to separate two teams tied on points was used up until the 1976-77 season. The points system: 2 points for a win, 1 point for a draw and 0 points for losing.

=== Results ===
QPR scores given first

Win Draw Loss

=== Southern League First Division ===
Date	Venue	Opponent	Result	Score F–A	Scorers	Attendance	League Position
30 August 1919	A	Bristol R	W	2–0	Donald, Gregory	7,000	4
1 September 1919	A	Plymouth	D	0–0		8,837	2
6 September 1919	H	Reading	D	0–0		10,000	4
8 September 1919	H	Plymouth	W	1–0	Mitchell (pen)	6,000	3
13 September 1919	A	Southampton	L	1–2	Donald	7,000	6
20 September 1919	H	Luton	W	4–0	Gregory 2, Birch, Smith	6,000	4
25 September 1919	H	Southend	D	2–2	Birch 2	6,000	4
27 September 1919	A	Gillingham	W	1–0	Birch	8,000	3
4 October 1919	H	Swansea	W	2–0	Smith, Birch	12,000	2
11 October 1919	A	Exeter	W	1–0	Gregory	6,000	1
16 October 1919	H	Newport	W	1–0	Birch	6,000	1
18 October 1919	H	Cardiff	D	0–0		10,000	1
25 October 1919	H	Watford	W	3–0	Donald, Whyman, Smith	14,000	1
1 November 1919	A	Swindon	L	2–5	Birch, Gregory	10,000	2
8 November 1919	H	Millwall	L	1–2	Birch	10,000	3
15 November 1919	A	Brighton	W	3–2	Birch, Smith 2	13,000	3
29 November 1919	A	Portsmouth	L	2–4	Baldock, Broster	17,000	4
6 December 1919	H	Northampton	W	5–1	Smith 3, Baldock, Birch	7,000	4
13 December 1919	A	Crystal P	L	0–1		12,000	4
25 December 1919	H	Brentford	W	2–0	Mitchell, Broster	15,000	4
26 December 1919	A	Brentford	L	1–2	Smith	13,623	5
27 December 1919	A	Norwich	L	1–3	Birch	12,000	6
3 January 1920	H	Bristol R	W	7–1	Smith 4, Sutch 2, Donald	10,000	6
17 January 1920	A	Reading	W	1–0	Smith	10,000	5
24 January 1920	H	Southampton	W	2–1	Donald, Gregory	14,000	5
7 February 1920	H	Gillingham	D	0–0		10,000	4
14 February 1920	A	Swansea	L	1–3	Smith	20,000	5
21 February 1920	H	Exeter	D	0–0		7,000	5
28 February 1920	A	Cardiff	L	0–4		17,000	6
6 March 1920	A	Watford	L	0–1		7,000	6
13 March 1920	H	Swindon	W	2–1	Birch, Gregory	8,000	6
20 March 1920	A	Millwall	D	0–0		26,000	6
22 March 1920	A	Luton	L	1–2	Summers (og)	4,000	6
27 March 1920	H	Brighton	W	3–1	Smith, Gregory 2	8,000	6
2 April 1920	A	Merthyr T	W	4–1	Birch 2, Smith, Ramsay	8,000	5
3 April 1920	A	Newport	L	0–3		9,000	6
5 April 1920	H	Merthyr T	D	0–0		7,000	6
10 April 1920	H	Portsmouth	D	1–1	Birch	10,000	6
17 April 1920	A	Northampton	L	0–2		7,000	6
24 April 1920	H	Crystal P	L	2–3	Gregory 2	14,000	7
26 April 1920	A	Southend	D	2–2	Gregory 2	8,000	6
1 May 1920	H	Norwich	W	1–0	Gregory	12,000	6

=== FA Cup ===
Round	Date	Venue	Opponent	Result	Score F–A	Scorers	Attendance
Sixth round qualifying	Saturday 20 December 1919			BYE			
FACup 1	10 January 1920	A	Aston Villa (First Division)	L	1–2	Birch 84'	33,000

=== London Professional Charity Fund ===
Date	Venue	Opponent	Result	Score F–A	Scorers	Attendance
23 October 1919	H	Brentford	W	5–1	Birch, Smith 4 (1 pen)	3,000

=== London Challenge Cup ===
Round	Date	Venue	Opponent	Result	Score F–A	Scorers	Attendance
LCC 1	18 September 1919	H	Brentford	W	6–0	Birch 2, Mitchell 2 (1 pen), Smith, Gregory	6,000
LCC 2	6 October 1919	6 H	West Ham	W	2–1	Gregory, Birch	6,000
LCCSF	10 November 1919	Highbury	Chelsea	L	0–1		6,000

== Squad ==
Position	Nationality	Name	Southern League		FA Cup		Total	
Position	Nationality	Name	Apps	Goals	Apps	Goals	Apps	Goals
GK	ENG	Len Hill						
GK	ENG	Joe Merrick	38		1		39	
GK	ENG	Harry Gould						
GK	ENG	Ted Price						
GK	ENG	Fred Berry	4				4	
DF	ENG	Ben Marsden						
DF	ENG	Joe Wingrove	33		1		34	
DF	ENG	Fred Blackman	17		1		18	
DF	ENG	Harry Pullen	28				28	
DF	ENG	C. Olsen	1				1	
DF	ENG	Joseph Wilde	6				6	
DF	ENG	Isaac Haggan	1				1	
DF	ENG	Fred Watts	1				1	
DF	ENG	George Wodehouse	1				1	
MF	ENG	Jack Gregory	40	14	1		41	14
MF	ENG	Archie Mitchell	34	2	1		35	2
MF	ENG	John Baldock	42	2	1		43	2
MF	IRE	Tom McGovern						
MF	ENG	Mick O'Brien						
MF	ENG	Jack Broster	35	2	1		36	2
MF	ENG	Chris Ramsay	12	1			12	1
MF	ENG	Bert Middlemiss						
MF	ENG	Alf Whyman	9	1			9	1
MF	ENG	George Fox	8				8	
MF	ENG	Albert Chester	1				1	
FW	ENG	David Donald	39	5	1		40	5
FW	ENG	Jimmy Birch	39	15	1	1	40	16
FW	ENG	Jack Smith	42	17	1		43	17
FW	SCO	Roy Faulkner						
FW	ENG	Jack Manning						
FW	ENG	Harry Pidgeon	6				6	
FW	ENG	Tommy Cain	7				7	
FW	ENG	Billy Thompson	13		1		14	
FW	ENG	William Sutch	1	2			1	2
FW	SCO	Jimmy Miller	3				3	
FW	ENG	Walter Lowe	1				1	

== Transfers in ==
Name	from	Date	Fee
John Miller	Hamilton Academical	14 July 1919	
Fred Blackman	Leeds City	28 July 1919	
C. Olsen		cs1919	
Poplett, John *	Shepherd's Bush	cs1919	
Brooks, J W *		cs1919	
Harry Gould	Metropolitan Police	cs1919	
George Wodehouse	Summerstown	Aug1919	
Thomas Cain	Dublin Bohemians	29 August 1919	
Walter Lowe		Oct1919	
Albert Chester	Tottenham	21 October 1919	
Chris Ramsay	Botwell Mission	Nov1919	
William Sutch		9 December 1919	
Fred Berry	Rochdale	18 December 1919	
Isaac Haggan	Usworth Colliery	9 March 1920	
Tom McGovern	Brentford	Apr1920	
Fred Watts	Royal Marines	Apr1920	
Harry Pidgeon	Gnome Athletic	Apr1920	
Len Hill	Southend	3 May 1920	
Ben Marsden	Port Vale	14 May 1920	
Mick O'Brien	South Shields	14 May 1920	
Ted Price	Brentford	20 May 1920	
Bert Middlemiss	Tottenham	1 June 1920	
Roy Faulkner	Blackburn	1 June 1920	
Jack Manning	Rotherham County	16 June 1920	
Rippengill, Herbert *	King's Lynn	cs1920	
Armitage, S *		cs1920	
Payne, T *		cs1920	
Slader, Charles *		cs1920	

== Transfers out ==
Name	from	Date	Fee	Date	To	Fee
Wright, Francis		Nov1916		cs 1919	Ilford	
Brown, W T		Oct1917		cs 1919	Folkestone	
McClinton, George		Mar1918		cs 1919		
Simons, Tommy	Fulham	13 November 1914		cs 1919		
Wake, Bill	Exeter	1 May 1909		July 1919	Maidstone U	
Read, Albert *	Uxbridge	cs1913		July 1919	Tufnell Park	
Durston, Jack	Clophill	31 August 1914		Oct 1919	Brentford	
Brooks, J W *		cs1919		Jan 1920	Yiewsley	
Chris Ramsay	Botwell Mission	Nov1919		Apr 1920	Botwell Mission	
Joe Merrick	Aston Villa	30 June 1919		May 1920	Birmingham	
John Miller	Hamilton Academical	14 July 1919		May 1920	Abertillery Town	
Harry Pullen	Kettering Town	4 May 1910		June 1920	Newport	
Jack Broster	Chorley	6 July 1912		June 1920	Rochdale	
Fred Berry	Rochdale	18 December 1919		cs 1920		
C. Olsen		cs1919		cs 1920	Graysons	
Alf Whyman	New Brompton	4 May 1909		cs 1920	Retired	
Poplett, John *	Shepherd's Bush	cs1919		cs 1920	Eastman's Dyeworks	
Albert Chester	Tottenham	21 October 1919		cs 1920	Ramsgate	Free
