= 1913–14 Aston Villa F.C. season =

English football club season

Aston Villa
1913–14 season
- President: Joseph Ansell
- Chairman: Frederick Rinder
- Manager: George Ramsay
- First Division: 2nd
- FA Cup: Semi finals
Home colours

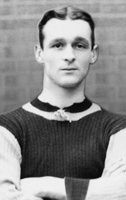
"Happy" Harry Hampton

The 1913–14 English football season was Aston Villa's 26th season in the Football League.

"The Wellington Whirlwind," played as a centre forward for Aston Villa from 1904 to 1920. There were debuts for Bill Williams, John Laidlaw, Jack McLaverty, Bob Chandler, Reg Boyne, Bert McLachlan, Archie Dyke, Herby Smart and Charlie Slade (3).

== Table ==
| Pos | Team | Pld | W | D | L | GF | GA | GAv | Pts |
|---|---|---|---|---|---|---|---|---|---|
| 1 | Blackburn Rovers (C) | 38 | 20 | 11 | 7 | 78 | 42 | 1.857 | 51 |
| 2 | Aston Villa | 38 | 19 | 6 | 13 | 65 | 50 | 1.300 | 44 |
| 3 | Middlesbrough | 38 | 19 | 5 | 14 | 77 | 60 | 1.283 | 43 |
| 4 | Oldham Athletic | 38 | 17 | 9 | 12 | 55 | 45 | 1.222 | 43 |
| 5 | West Bromwich Albion | 38 | 15 | 13 | 10 | 46 | 42 | 1.095 | 43 |

Source: World Football
Rules for classification: 1) Points; 2) Goal average; 3) Goals scored
(C) Champions

=== Matches ===
| 1 Sep 1913 | Aston Villa | 1–1 | Manchester City |
| | Tommy Barber (52') | Report |

| 6 Sep 1913 | Bradford | 0–0 | Aston Villa |
| | | Report |
Note:

| 13 Sep 1913 | Aston Villa | 1–3 | Blackburn |
| | Clem Stephenson (66') | Report |

| 20 Sep 1913 | Sunderland | 2–0 | Aston Villa |
| | | Report |

| 27 Sep 1913 | Aston Villa | 3–1 | Everton |
| | Joe Bache (28', 63'); Sammy Whittaker (36') | Report |

| 4 Oct 1913 | Albion | 1–0 | Aston Villa |
| | | Report |

| 11 Oct 1913 | Aston Villa | 2–0 | Wednesday |
| | Tommy Barber (8'); Harry Hampton (32') | Report |

| 18 Oct 1913 | Bolton | 3–0 | Aston Villa |
| | | Report |

| 25 Oct 1913 | Aston Villa | 1–2 | Chelsea |
| | Own Goal (85') | Report |

| 1 Nov 1913 | Oldham | 0–1 | Aston Villa |
| | | Report | Clem Stephenson (53') |

| 8 Nov 1913 | Aston Villa | 3–1 | United |
| | Harry Hampton (19' pen); Albert Hall (35'); Sammy Whittaker (65') | Report |

| 15 Nov 1913 | Burnley | 4–0 | Aston Villa |
| | | Report |

| 22 Nov 1913 | Aston Villa | 3–0 | Preston |
| | Harry Hampton (1'); Sammy Whittaker (25'); Charlie Wallace (27') | Report |

| 29 Nov 1913 | Newcastle | 2–2 | Aston Villa |
| | | Report | Harry Hampton (35'); Clem Stephenson (42') |

| 6 Dec 1913 | Aston Villa | 2–1 | Liverpool |
| | Harry Hampton (25', 40' pen) | Report |

| 13 Dec 1913 | Aston Villa | 3–3 | Spurs |
| | Jimmy Harrop (30'); Sammy Whittaker (63'); Harry Hampton (89') | Report |

| 20 Dec 1913 | Boro | 5–2 | Aston Villa |
| | | Report | Clem Stephenson (6', 82') |

| 25 Dec 1913 | Derby | 0–2 | Aston Villa |
| | | Report | Harry Hampton (47'); Clem Stephenson (80') |

| 26 Dec 1913 | Aston Villa | 3–0 | Sheffield United |
| | Harry Hampton (55' pen); Tommy Barber (58'); Charlie Wallace | Report |

| 27 Dec 1913 | Aston Villa | 0–1 | Bradford |
| | | Report |

| 1 Jan 1914 | Sheffield United | 3–0 | Aston Villa |
| | | Report |

| 3 Jan 1914 | Blackburn | 0–0 | Aston Villa |
| | | Report |

| 17 Jan 1914 | Aston Villa | 5–0 | Sunderland |
| | Joe Bache (1', 79'); Harold Edgley (16', 27'); Harry Hampton (37') | Report |
Note: [2/11] The second of eleven consecutive victories.

| 24 Jan 1914 | Everton | 1–4 | Aston Villa |
| | | Report | Harry Hampton (37'); Clem Stephenson (65', 89'); Own Goal (83') |
Note: [3/11]

| 7 Feb 1914 | Aston Villa | 2–0 | Albion |
| | Charlie Wallace (10'); Tommy Barber (50') | Report |
Note: [5/11]

| 14 Feb 1914 | Wednesday | 2–3 | Aston Villa |
| | | Report | Clem Stephenson (30'); Harry Hampton (46'); Joe Bache (56') |
Note: [6/11]

| 25 Feb 1914 | Aston Villa | 1–0 | Bolton |
| | Harry Hampton (33') | Report |
Note: [8/11]

| 28 Feb 1914 | Chelsea | 0–3 | Aston Villa |
| | | Report | Clem Stephenson (25'); Harry Hampton (36'); Joe Bache (85') |
Note: [9/11]

| 14 Mar 1914 | Manchester United | 0–6 | Aston Villa | Old Trafford |
| | | Report | Harold Edgley (13'); Joe Bache (25', 48', 71'); Harry Hampton (54'); Clem Stephenson (78') |
Note: [11/11]

| 18 Mar 1914 | Aston Villa | 0–0 | Oldham Athletic |
| | | Report |

| 21 Mar 1914 | Aston Villa | 1–0 | Burnley |
| | Harold Edgley (28') | Report |

| 1 Apr 1914 | Preston | 3–2 | Aston Villa |
| | | Report | Clem Stephenson (34'); Harry Hampton (86' pen) |

| 4 Apr 1914 | Aston Villa | 1–3 | Newcastle |
| | Charlie Wallace (67' pen) | Report |

| 10 Apr 1914 | Manchester City | 3–1 | Aston Villa |
| | | Report | Harold Edgley (16') |

| 11 Apr 1914 | Liverpool | 0–1 | Aston Villa |
| | | Report | Joe Bache (39') |

| 13 Apr 1914 | Aston Villa | 3–2 | Derby County |
| | Harry Hampton (21' pen, 51'); Joe Bache (34') | Report |

| 18 Apr 1914 | Tottenham Hotspur | 0–2 | Aston Villa |
| | | Report | McLachlan (20'); Harry Hampton (78') |

| 25 Apr 1914 | Aston Villa | 1–3 | Middlesbrough |
| | Joe Bache (51') | Report |
Note: Hardy, Littlewood, Weston, Morris, Harrop, Edgley, Wallace, Stephenson, Hampton, McLachlan, Bache

Source: avfchistory.co.uk

== FA Cup ==
=== First round ===
38 of the 40 clubs from the First and Second divisions joined the 12 clubs who came through the qualifying rounds. Fourteen Southern League sides were given byes to the first round to bring the total number of teams up to 64. The meeting of Merthyr Town and Swansea Town at Vetch Field was the first all-Welsh tie in the main draw of the English Cup competition since Druids faced off against Chirk in the third round of the 1884–85 tournament. Their meeting meant that this was the first season since the introduction of FA Cup qualifying rounds that two teams from Wales featured in the first round proper.

| Tie no | Home | Score | Away | Date | Notes |
|---|---|---|---|---|---|
| 7 | Aston Villa | 4–0 | Stoke | 10 January | [1/11] |

The cupholders started the defence of their title on a grim January Saturday in Birmingham. Clem Stephenson's opening goal came after 15 minutes with Harry Hampton doubling the score a minute later. Hampton got his second half-hour into the second-half and Stephenson completed his brace a minute later. The victory over Stoke would be the first of eleven consecutive victories.

=== Second round ===
The 16 second-round matches were played on 31 January 1914. One match was drawn, with the replay taking place the following weekend.

| Tie no | Home team | Score | Away | Date | Notes |
|---|---|---|---|---|---|
| 15 | Exeter City | 1–2 | Aston Villa | 31 January | [4/11] |

=== Third round ===
The eight third-round matches were scheduled for 21 February 1914. There was one replay, played in the following midweek fixture. Queens Park Rangers beat Birmingham City to qualify for the quarter-finals: the last non-league team to achieve such a feat until Lincoln City in the 2016–17 FA Cup.

| Tie no | Home | Score | Away | Date | Notes |
|---|---|---|---|---|---|
| 4 | Aston Villa | 2–1 | West Bromwich Albion | 21 February 1914 | [7/11] |

=== Fourth round ===
The four fourth-round matches were scheduled for 7 March 1914. There were two replays, played in the following midweek. One of these, between Manchester City and Sheffield United, went to a second replay, which Sheffield United won.

| Tie no | Home | Score | Away | Date | Notes |
|---|---|---|---|---|---|
| 2 | The Wednesday | 0–1 | Aston Villa | 7 March | [10/11] |

=== Semi finals ===
The semi-final matches were played on 28 March 1914. The Burnley–Sheffield United match went to a replay, which Burnley won, going on to meet Liverpool in the final.

28 March 1914
15:00

| Liverpool | 2–0 | Aston Villa |

White Hart Lane, London
