= Ernie Butler =

Ernie Butler may refer to:

- Ernie Butler (comedian) (died 2007), Canadian comedian
- Ernie Butler (footballer, born 1896) (1896–1979), English football winger
- Ernie Butler (footballer, born 1919) (1919–2002), English football goalkeeper
- Ernie Butler (footballer, born 1924) (1924–2014), English football outside right
