= Jack Burnham (footballer) =

English footballer

Personal information
- Full name: John Robert Burnham
- Date of birth: 11 January 1896
- Place of birth: Southwick, County Durham, England
- Date of death: 1973 (aged 77)
- Place of death: Sunderland, England
- Height: 6 ft 1 in (1.85 m)
- Positions: Wing half; centre half

Senior career*
Years	Team	Apps	(Gls)
- Southwick
1919–1920	Sunderland Comrades		
1920–1921	Brighton & Hove Albion	1	(0)
1921–1923	Queens Park Rangers	31	(0)
1923–1924	Durham City	20	(0)
1924–1926	Scunthorpe & Lindsey United		
1926–1927	Durham City	3	(0)
1927–1928	West Stanley		
1928–19??	Jarrow		
- * Club domestic league appearances and goals

John Robert Burnham (11 January 1896 – 1973) was an English professional footballer who played as a wing half or centre half in the Football League for Brighton & Hove Albion, Queens Park Rangers and Durham City.

== Life and career ==
Burnham was born in 1896 in Southwick, County Durham, to Robert Burnham, a shipyard labourer, and his wife Maria. By the 1911 Census, both Burnham and his father were working in the coal mines.

Burnham played football for Southwick before the First World War, and afterwards returned to the Wearside League with Sunderland Comrades. That club's secretary, Billy Crinson, had kept goal for Brighton & Hove Albion in the 1910s, and recommended Burnham to his former employers. Burnham duly signed as a professional in March 1920, and helped the reserve team win the 1920–21 Southern League, title, but appeared only once for the first team, playing at left back away to Reading in the inaugural season of the Football League Third Division on 9 October 1920.

He joined Queens Park Rangers of the Third Division South in August 1921 on a free transfer, and made his debut in November against his former club, taking over the left-half position from Albert Read. He soon attracted attention for his size – "six feet and thirteen stone" (1.83 m and 83 kg) – and stamina. The Derby Daily Telegraph wrote that playing three matches in four days over the Christmas period had no ill effects, and commented that he was doing well at left half despite being better suited to the centre-half position. He was ever-present in league and FA Cup for the rest of the season, and played the last few matches in the centre. In 1922–23 he made only four appearances, and left the club at the end of the season.

Burnham returned to his native north-east of England and signed for Third Division North club Durham City in July 1923. He occupied the right-half position during the first half of the season, but lost his place to new arrival Joe Robson and rarely regained it. At the end of the campaign, he moved on to Scunthorpe & Lindsey United of the Midland League, where he spent two years before returning to Durham City in 1926. As backup to John Gurkin at centre half, he rarely appeared, and went back to non-league football with West Stanley and Jarrow.

Burnham died in Sunderland in 1973 at the age of 77.

== Career statistics ==
Appearances and goals by club, season and competition
Club	Season	League			FA Cup		Total	
Club	Season	Division	Apps	Goals	Apps	Goals	Apps	Goals
Brighton & Hove Albion	1920–21	Third Division	1	0	0	0	1	0
Queens Park Rangers	1921–22	Third Division South	27	0	2	0	29	0
Queens Park Rangers	1922–23	Third Division South	4	0	0	0	4	0
Queens Park Rangers	Total		31	0	2	0	33	0
Durham City	1923–24	Third Division North	20	0	3	0	23	0
Durham City	1926–27	Third Division North	3	0	0	0	3	0
Durham City	Total		23	0	3	0	26	0
Career total			55	0	5	0	60	0
