= Harold Lane =

Harold Lane may refer to:

- Harold Lane (rower), British rower
- Harold Lane (Canadian politician), Canadian provincial politician
- Harold Lane (Kansas politician), member of the Kansas House of Representatives
- Jennings Harold Lane, southern gospel singer

== See also ==
- Harry Lane (disambiguation)
