= Edgley =

Edgley is a surname. Notable people with the surname include:

- Gigi Edgley (born 1977), Australian actress and recording artist
- Harry Edgley (1891–1966), English footballer
- Leslie Edgley (1912–2002), English-born American mystery fiction writer
- Mark Edgley Smith (1955–2008), British composer
- Richard C. Edgley (1936–2026), American Mormon leader
- Ross Edgley (born 1985), British athlete, ultra-marathon sea swimmer, and author

== See also ==
- Edgley International, theatre and concert promotions company from Australia, first started in the 1930s
- Edgley Optica, British light aircraft designed for observation work, intended as a low-cost alternative to helicopters
