= Harry Lane (disambiguation) =

Harry Lane (1855–1917) was an American politician.

Harry Lane may also refer to:

- Harry Lane (footballer, born 1894) (1894–?), English footballer
- Harry Lane (footballer, born 1909) (1909–1977), English footballer
- Sir Philip Lane (police officer) (Harry Philip Parnell Lane, 1870–1927), British police officer

== See also ==
- Harold Lane (disambiguation)
- Henry Lane (disambiguation)
