= Henry Lane =

Henry Lane may refer to:

- Henry Lane (officer of arms) (1833–1913), English officer of arms
- Henry Lane (politician) (1873–1955), Australian politician
- Henry Bowyer Lane (1817–1878), Canadian architect
- Henry J. Lane (1841–1915), American merchant and politician from New York
- Henry S. Lane (1811–1881), United States representative, senator and governor of Indiana
- Henry Thomas Lane (1793–1834), English cricketer
- Harry Lane (footballer, born 1909) (Henry William Lane, 1909–1977), English footballer
- Master Juba (c. 1825–c. 1852/3), stage name of William Henry Lane

== See also ==
- Harry Lane (disambiguation)
