= Ben Scott (politician) =

American politician (born 1942)

Member of the Kansas House of Representatives from the 58th district
- In office November 20, 2015 – January 9, 2017
- Preceded by: Harold Lane
- Succeeded by: Vic Miller

Personal details
- Born: November 13, 1942 (age 83) Topeka, Kansas, U.S.
- Party: Democratic
- Spouse: Gwendolyn
- Profession: pastor

Ben Scott (born November 13, 1942) is a former American politician. He served as a Democratic member for the 58th district in the Kansas House of Representatives from 2015 to 2016.
