= Arthur Grimsdell =

English footballer and cricketer

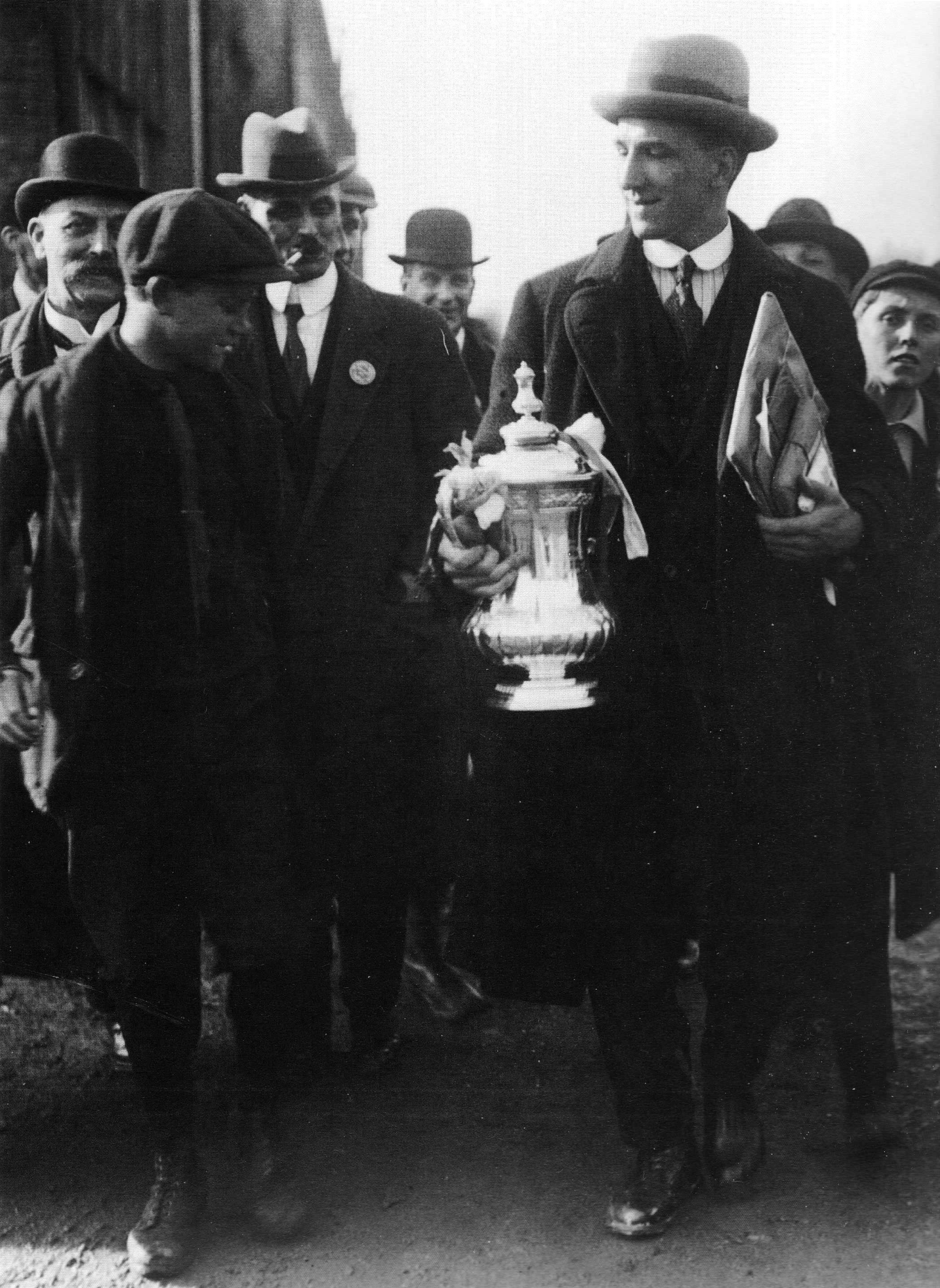
- Grimsdell displays the FA Cup to fans on the Tottenham High Road after Spurs' victory in the 1921 final

Personal information
- Date of birth: 23 March 1894
- Place of birth: Watford, England
- Date of death: 12 March 1963 (aged 68)
- Place of death: Watford, England
- Height: 5 ft 10 in (1.78 m)

Senior career*
Years	Team	Apps	(Gls)
1912–1929	Tottenham Hotspur	324	(26)
1910-1911	St Albans City F.C.	8	(2)
Total		426	(45)

International career
1920–1923	England	6	(0)
- * Club domestic league appearances and goals

Arthur Grimsdell (23 March 1894 – 12 March 1963) was an English professional footballer. He was born in Watford, Hertfordshire and played at centre-half and later wing-half for Tottenham Hotspur and England. He captained both teams during the 1920s.

He was also a cricketer who played for Hertfordshire County Cricket Club at minor counties level. He was considered a sports personality of his era, featuring on footballer cigarette cards and interviewed for sports magazines.

He died, aged 68, in Watford on 12 March 1963.

== Football career ==
=== Club ===
Grimsdell started his career at St Albans City and Watford but transferred as a schoolboy player to Tottenham Hotspur at the age of 18 in April 1912. He played his first game that year. His career was interrupted by the First World War, in which he served as a trooper in the 1st Regiment of Life Guards and a lance corporal Guards Machine Gun Regiment. On his return in 1919, he captained Tottenham and scored 14 goals in the 1919–20 season, and led the team to win the Second Division that year. In the following season he captained the side, which won the FA Cup in 1921.

His successful club career continued until he broke his leg during the 1925 season. He did not return to play for the side until 1927 and he went on to play for Spurs until April 1929 when he was released by the club. He subsequently went to Clapton Orient where he took on a player-manager-secretary role.

He made a total of 418 appearances for Tottenham scoring 43 goals including 324 League appearances (26 goals) and 36 FA Cup matches (1 goal). In recognition of his distinguished career and service to the club he was admitted into the Tottenham Hotspur Hall of Fame.

Following the conclusion of the Second World War, Grimsdell served on Watford's board of directors from 1945 until 1951.

=== International ===
Grimsdell had a trial for the England team in 1913 but only started his international career after the war when he played for England six times between 1920 and 1923 as a left-half, captaining the team on three of these occasions.

== Cricket career ==
Grimsdell was a right-handed batsman and occasional wicketkeeper who played for Hertfordshire County Cricket Club in the minor counties league. He played once for the East of England side against New Zealand at Wisbech, Cambridgeshire in July 1927, scoring 3 runs (1st innings) and 40 runs (2nd innings).

== Personal life ==
Grimsdell's brother Ernie also became a footballer.

== Career statistics ==
=== International ===
Appearances and goals by national team and year
National team	Year	Apps	Goals
England	1920	3	0
England	1921	1	0
England	1922	1	0
England	1923	1	0
Total		6	0

== Honours ==
Tottenham Hotspur

- Football League Second Division: 1919–20
- FA Cup: 1920–21
