= Ernie Butler (footballer, born 1924) =

English footballer (1924–2014)

Personal information
- Full name: Ernest Butler
- Date of birth: 28 August 1924
- Place of birth: Middlesbrough, England
- Date of death: 17 July 2014 (aged 89)
- Place of death: Thornaby-on-Tees, England
- Position: Outside right

Senior career*
Years	Team	Apps	(Gls)
- Stockton
1948–1953	Southend United	36	(3)
1953–1954	Darlington	6	(0)
- * Club domestic league appearances and goals

Ernest Butler (28 August 1924 – 17 July 2014) was an English footballer who made 42 appearances in the Football League playing as an outside right for Southend United and Darlington. He also played non-league football for Stockton. Butler died in Thornaby-on-Tees on 17 July 2014 at the age of 89.
