= William Fall =

English footballer

Personal information
- Full name: William Fall
- Date of birth: 26 October 1900
- Place of birth: Tyne Dock, England
- Date of death: 1965 (aged 64–65)
- Height: 5 ft 9 in (1.75 m)
- Position: Wing half

Senior career*
Years	Team	Apps	(Gls)
1923	Tyne Dock		
1923–1925	Sunderland	4	(0)
1925–19??	West Stanley		
- * Club domestic league appearances and goals

William Fall (26 October 1900 – 1965) was an English professional footballer who played as a wing half for Sunderland.
