= Walter Picken =

English footballer

Personal information
- Full name: Walter Picken
- Date of birth: 1 February 1900
- Place of birth: Rotherham, England
- Date of death: 1981 (aged 80–81)
- Position: Half-back

Senior career*
Years	Team	Apps	(Gls)
1919–1920	Tinsley United		
1920–1924	Rotherham County	69	(0)
1924–1925	Rotherham United	17	(1)
Total		86	(1)
- * Club domestic league appearances and goals

Walter Picken (1 February 1900 – 1981) was an English footballer who played in the Football League for Rotherham County and Rotherham United.
