= Ben Marsden (footballer) =

English footballer

Personal information
- Full name: Benjamin Marsden
- Date of birth: 5 May 1898
- Place of birth: Hanley, England
- Date of death: 1971 (aged 72–73)
- Position: Right-back

Senior career*
Years	Team	Apps	(Gls)
1918–1920	Port Vale	0	(0)
1920–1925	Queens Park Rangers	126	(6)
1925–1926	Reading	2	(0)
Total		128	(0)
- * Club domestic league appearances and goals

Benjamin Marsden (5 May 1898 – 1971) was an English footballer who played as a right-back for Port Vale, Queens Park Rangers, and Reading.

== Career ==
Marsden made his first-team debut for Port Vale at right-back in a 1–1 draw with Bury at Gigg Lane in a wartime league match on 7 September 1918. He was released at the end of the 1919–20 season after playing a total of six wartime league games for the club. He later played for Queens Park Rangers and Reading.

== Career statistics ==
Appearances and goals by club, season and competition
Club	Season	League			FA Cup		Total	
Club	Season	Division	Apps	Goals	Apps	Goals	Apps	Goals
Port Vale	1919–20	Second Division	0	0	0	0	0	0
Queens Park Rangers	1920–21	Third Division South	16	0	0	0	16	0
Queens Park Rangers	1921–22	Third Division South	37	0	2	0	39	0
Queens Park Rangers	1922–23	Third Division South	34	2	4	0	38	2
Queens Park Rangers	1923–24	Third Division South	21	3	0	0	21	3
Queens Park Rangers	1924–25	Third Division South	18	1	0	0	18	1
Queens Park Rangers	Total		126	6	6	0	132	6
Reading	1925–26	Third Division South	2	0	0	0	2	0
Career total			128	6	6	0	134	6
