= 1921–22 Arsenal F.C. season =

English football club season

Arsenal
1921–22 season
- Chairman: Henry Norris
- Manager: Leslie Knighton
- Stadium: Highbury
- First Division: 17th
- FA Cup: Fourth round
- Top goalscorer: League: Henry White (14); All: Henry White (19)
- Highest home attendance: 42,000 vs. Tottenham Hotspur (22 April 1922)
- Lowest home attendance: 12,000 vs. Liverpool (22 March 1922)
Home colours	Away colours

The 1921–22 season was Arsenal's 3rd consecutive season in the top division of English football. In the 1921-22 Season, Arsenal won the London FA Challenge Cup, ending a 32-year trophy drought.

== Results ==
Arsenal's score comes first

=== Legend ===
Win	Draw	Loss

=== Football League First Division ===
Date	Opponent	Venue	Result	Attendance	Scorers
27 August 1921	Sheffield United	H	1–2		
29 August 1921	Preston North End	A	2–3		
3 September 1921	Sheffield United	A	1–4		
5 September 1921	Preston North End	H	1–0		
10 September 1921	Manchester City	A	0–2		
17 September 1921	Manchester City	H	0–1		
24 September 1921	Everton	A	1–1		
1 October 1921	Everton	H	1–0		
8 October 1921	Sunderland	A	0–1		
15 October 1921	Sunderland	H	1–2		
22 October 1921	Huddersfield Town	A	0–2		
29 October 1921	Huddersfield Town	H	1–3		
5 November 1921	Birmingham	A	1–0		
12 November 1921	Birmingham	H	5–2		
19 November 1921	Bolton Wanderers	A	0–1		
3 December 1921	Blackburn Rovers	A	1–0		
10 December 1921	Blackburn Rovers	H	1–1		
12 December 1921	Bolton Wanderer	H	1–1		
17 December 1921	Oldham Athletic	A	1–2		
24 December 1921	Oldham Athletic	H	0–1		
26 December 1921	Cardiff City	H	0–0		
27 December 1921	Cardiff City	A	3–4		
31 December 1921	Chelsea	A	2–0		
14 January 1922	Chelsea	H	1–0		
21 January 1922	Burnley	H	0–0		
4 February 1922	Newcastle United	H	2–1		
11 February 1922	Newcastle United	A	1–3		
20 February 1922	Burnley	A	0–1		
25 February 1922	Liverpool	A	0–4		
11 March 1922	Manchester United	A	0–1		
18 March 1922	Aston Villa	A	0–2		
22 March 1922	Liverpool	H	1–0		
25 March 1922	Aston Villa	H	2–0		
1 March 1922	Middlesbrough	H	2–2		
5 April 1922	Manchester United	H	3–1		
8 April 1922	Middlesbrough	A	2–4		
15 April 1922	Tottenham Hotspur	A	0–2		
17 April 1922	West Bromwich Albion	A	3–0		
18 April 1922	West Bromwich Albion	H	2–2		
22 April 1922	Tottenham Hotspur	H	1–0		
29 April 1922	Bradford City	A	2–0		
6 May 1922	Bradford City	H	1–0		

==== Final League table ====
Pos	Team	Pld	W	D	L	GF	GA	GAv	Pts
15	Blackburn Rovers	42	13	12	17	54	57	0.947	38
16	Preston North End	42	13	12	17	42	65	0.646	38
17	Arsenal	42	15	7	20	47	56	0.839	37
18	Birmingham	42	15	7	20	48	60	0.800	37
19	Oldham Athletic	42	13	11	18	38	50	0.760	37

Source: World Football
Rules for classification: 1) Points; 2) Goal average; 3) Goals scored

=== FA Cup ===
Round	Date	Opponent	Venue	Result	Attendance	Goalscorers
R1	7 January 1922	Queens Park Rangers	H	0–0	31,000	
R1:R	11 January 1922	Queens Park Rangers	A	2–1	21,411	Milne, Graham (pen.)
R2	28 January 1922	Bradford Park Avenue	A	3–2	10,400	Blyth, White (2)
R3	18 February 1922	Leicester City	H	3–0	39,421	Rutherford, White (2)
R4	4 March 1922	Preston North End	H	1–1	37,517	White
R4:R	8 March 1922	Preston North End	A	1–2 (aet)	30,000	Blyth

== See also ==
- 1921–22 in English football
- List of Arsenal F.C. seasons
