= Sammy Whittaker =

English footballer

Personal information
- Full name: Samson Clement Whittaker
- Date of birth: 12 August 1888
- Place of birth: Shelfield, England
- Date of death: 19 September 1952 (aged 64)
- Place of death: Wednesfield, England
- Positions: Wing half; inside right

Senior career*
Years	Team	Apps	(Gls)
- Shelfield Methodists
- Aldridge Arms
- Rushall Red Cross
- Bloxwich Strollers
1908–1915	Aston Villa	62	(6)
- Walsall
- * Club domestic league appearances and goals

Samson Clement Whittaker (12 August 1888 – 19 September 1952) was an English professional footballer who played as a wing half in the Football League for Aston Villa.

== Personal life ==
Whittaker served as a pioneer in the Royal Engineers Inland Waterways and Docks during the latter months of the First World War.

== Career statistics ==
Appearances and goals by club, season and competition
Club	Season	League			FA Cup		Total	
Club	Season	Division	Apps	Goals	Apps	Goals	Apps	Goals
Aston Villa	1908–09	First Division	4	0	0	0	4	0
Aston Villa	1911–12	First Division	24	1	3	0	27	1
Aston Villa	1912–13	First Division	18	0	2	0	20	0
Aston Villa	1913–14	First Division	14	4	1	0	15	4
Aston Villa	1914–15	First Division	2	1	0	0	2	1
Career total			62	6	6	0	68	6
