= Hugh Richmond =

Scottish footballer

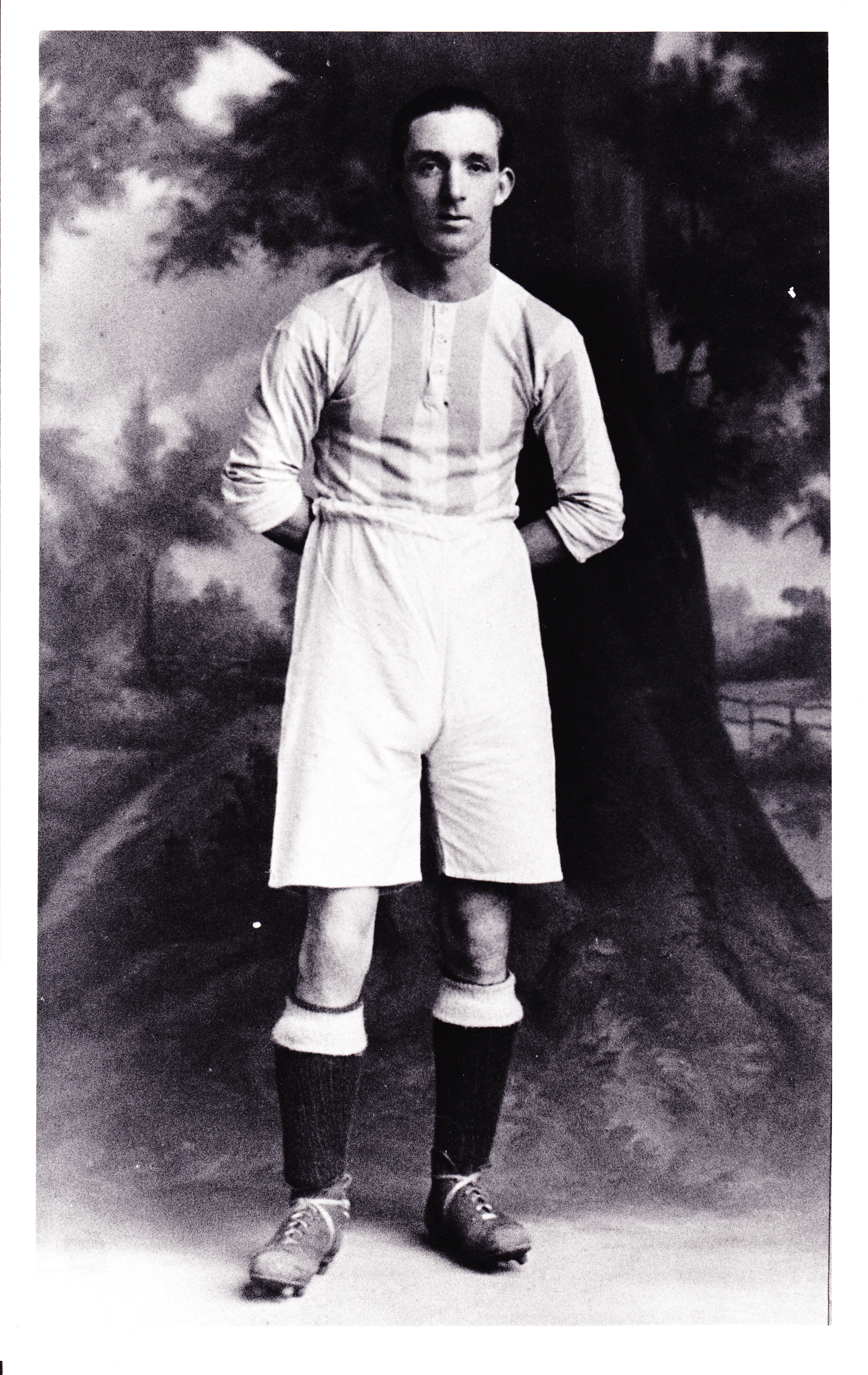
- Hugh Richmond, Leicester City 1920

Personal information
- Full name: Hugh Richmond
- Date of birth: 8 February 1895
- Place of birth: Riccarton, Scotland
- Date of death: 1962 (aged 68–69)
- Positions: Half-back; centre forward

Senior career*
Years	Team	Apps	(Gls)
1911–1913	Kilbirnie Ladeside		
1913–1914	Kilmarnock		
1914	→ Galston (loan)		
1916–1919	Arthurlie		
1919–1922	Leicester City	24	(2)
1919	→ Nuneaton Town (loan)		
1922–1925	Coventry City	65	(16)
1925–1926	Queens Park Rangers	10	(0)
1926–1928	Blyth Spartans	110	(18)
1928–1929	Spennymoor United		
1929	Bedlington United	15	(3)
Total		224	(39)
- * Club domestic league appearances and goals

Hugh Richmond (9 March 1895 – 1962) was a Scottish footballer who played in the Football League for Coventry City, Leicester City and Queens Park Rangers.
