= Ernest Myers (footballer) =

English footballer

Personal information
- Place of birth: Chapeltown, England
- Position: Inside left

Senior career*
Years	Team	Apps	(Gls)
- Northfleet
1909–1912	Crystal Palace	22	(1)
- Hickleton Main Colliery
1914–1920	Bradford City	1	(1)
1920–1921	Southend United	23	(2)
- Aberdare Athletic
1922–1925	Northampton Town	72	(30)
- Queens Park Rangers
- Exeter City
- Grantham
- Hartlepools United
- Gainsborough Trinity
- King's Lynn
Total		118+	(34+)
- * Club domestic league appearances and goals

Ernest Myers, also known as Colin Myers, was an English professional footballer who played as an inside left.

== Career ==
Born in Chapeltown, Sheffield, Myers spent his early career with Northfleet, Crystal Palace and Hickleton Main Colliery. He joined Bradford City in April 1914, and made 1 league appearance for the club, scoring 1 goal. He left the club in May 1920 to join Southend United, where he scored 2 goals in 23 league games. He later played for Aberdare Athletic, Northampton Town, Queens Park Rangers, Exeter City, Grantham, Hartlepools United, Gainsborough Trinity and King's Lynn.

== Sources ==
- Frost, Terry (1988). Bradford City A Complete Record 1903-1988. Breedon Books Sport. ISBN 0-907969-38-0.
