= Alberto Merciai =

Italian footballer (1900–1971)

Personal information
- Date of birth: 9 June 1900
- Place of birth: Pisa, Italy
- Date of death: 28 February 1971 (aged 70)
- Position: Midfielder

Senior career*
Years	Team	Apps	(Gls)
1920–1928	Pisa		
1928–1930	Juventus	6	(0)
1930–1931	Fiorentina	1	(0)
- * Club domestic league appearances and goals

Alberto Merciai (9 June 1900 – 28 February 1971) was an Italian professional football player.
