= Henry Thomas Lane =

English cricketer

Henry Thomas Lane (17 May 1793 – 15 February 1834) was an English amateur cricketer who played during the early 19th century.

Lane was born at Marylebone in Middlesex in 1793, the son of Thomas and Mary Lane. He lived at Hurstpierpoint in Sussex and was educated at Eton College and Christ Church, Oxford, matriculating in 1811. Lane was a member of Marylebone Cricket Club (MCC) but played mainly for West Kent. He appeared in nine matches between 1817 and 1827, playing for MCC as well as early Kent and Hampshire and played twice for the Gentlemen against the Players. He "failed to make any impression on the field" but was President of MCC in 1824/25 and has been described as "a well-liked character".

Lane lived at Middleton House at Westmeston near Lewes in Sussex. Part of the house was designed by George Stanley Repton in 1828. Lane married Jane Lambert in 1831. He died at Middleton in 1834 of apoplexy at the age of 40.

== Bibliography ==
- Carlaw, Derek (2020). Kent County Cricketers, A to Z: Part One (1806–1914) (PDF). Cardiff: ACS.
