= Harry Hampton =

Recipient of the Victoria Cross (1870–1922)

Harry Hampton VC
- Born: 14 December 1870; Richmond, Surrey, England
- Died: 2 November 1922 (aged 51); Twickenham, Middlesex, England
- Burial place: Richmond Cemetery
- Military career
- Allegiance: United Kingdom
- Branch: British Army
- Rank: Colour Sergeant
- Units: The King's (Liverpool) Regiment
- Conflicts: Second Boer War
- Awards: Victoria Cross

Harry Hampton VC (14 December 1870 – 2 November 1922) was an English recipient of the Victoria Cross, the highest award for gallantry in the face of the enemy that can be awarded to British and Commonwealth forces.

== Details ==
Hampton was born in Crown Terrace, Richmond (then in Surrey and now in London) on 14 December 1870.

Hampton was 29 years old, and a sergeant in the 2nd Battalion, The King's (Liverpool) Regiment, British Army during the Second Boer War when the following deed took place on 21 August 1900 at Van Wyk's Vlei, South Africa, for which he was awarded the VC:

On the 21st August, 1900, at Van Wyk's Vlei, Sergeant Hampton, who was in command of a small party of Mounted Infantry, held an important position for some time against heavy odds, and when compelled to retire saw all his men into safety, and then, although he had himself been wounded in the head, supported Lance-Corporal Walsh, who was unable to walk, until the latter was again hit and apparently killed, Sergeant Hampton himself being again wounded a short time after.

He received the decoration from King Edward VII, in person, during an investiture at St James's Palace on 17 December 1901.

== Further information ==
Hampton later achieved the rank of colour sergeant. He retired from the Army after the First World War and returned to the Richmond area, taking employment in the City of London as a commissionaire with a firm of solicitors. In 1919 whilst dismounting from a bus in Richmond his leg, injured during the Boer War, gave way. He continued to live at the family home of 151 Halliburton Road, St Margarets, Twickenham until his fatal accident in November 1922.

Hampton died in Twickenham on 2 November 1922. Although reported as having taken his own life by jumping in front of a train at Richmond rail station, he did in fact succumb to multiple injuries sustained from falling against a Shepperton train passing through St Margarets railway station in Twickenham. In the subsequent inquest there was no suggestion that he might have taken his own life, the opinion of the coroner being that a leg injured when he had fallen from a bus approximately two years before his death had given way as the Shepperton train passed through St Margarets station.

His funeral was held in St Margarets, after which his coffin was carried on a gun carriage with a military escort. He was conveyed from St Margarets, across Richmond Bridge, and on arriving outside Richmond Town Hall, the Mayor, councillors, and a crowd of several thousand had assembled to pay their respects, many of which then followed the gun carriage to Richmond Cemetery.

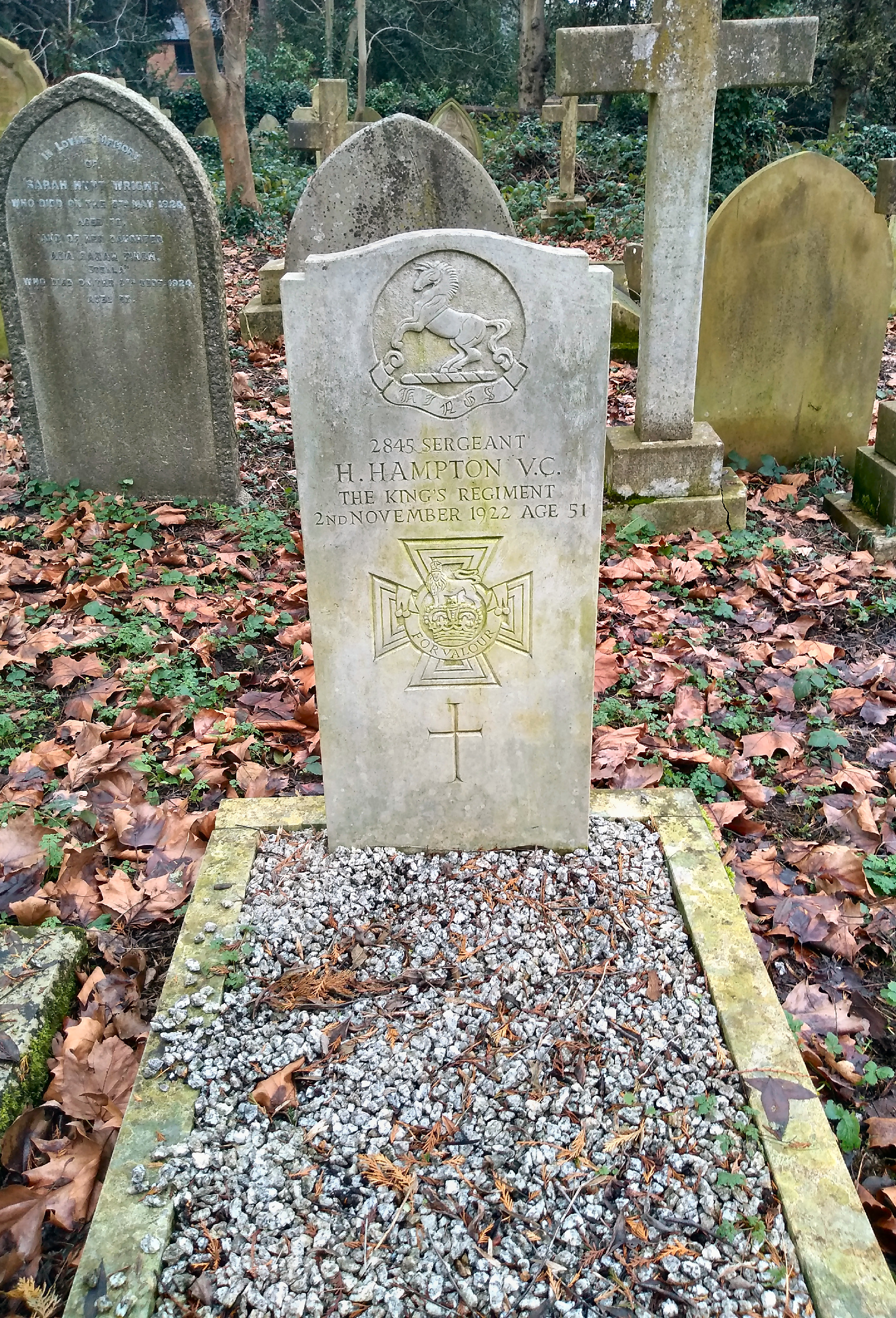
Richmond Old Burial Ground

He is buried in Richmond Cemetery, but for over 50 years his grave remained unmarked. In 1986 the location of the grave was re-discovered by Ron Buddle, a Metropolitan police officer and Victoria Cross historian who, with financial assistance from the King's Regiment Association, erected the present headstone. However, the date of death shown on the headstone of 4 February 1920 was incorrect, the error being corrected when the grave was restored in 2008 as part of the London Borough of Richmond upon Thames' "Adopt a Grave" scheme.

== The medal ==
The location of his Victoria Cross is unknown.

== Sources ==
- Buzzell, Nora (1997). The Register of the Victoria Cross, This England. Third ed., 352 pp. ISBN 0-906324-27-0
- Harvey, David (1999). Monuments to Courage: Victoria Cross Headstones and Memorials Vol. 2, 1917–1982. Kevin & Kay Patience. OCLC 59437300
- Uys, Ian (2000). Victoria Crosses of the Anglo-Boer War.
