= 1899–1900 KNVB Cup =

Tournament details
- Country: The Netherlands
- Dates: 5 November 1899 – 1 April 1900
- Teams: 26

Final positions
- Champions: CVV Velocitas (1st title)
- Runners-up: Ajax Leiden

Tournament statistics
- Matches played: 27
- Goals scored: 100 (3.7 per match)

The 1899–1900 KNVB Cup was the 2nd staging of the KNVB Cup. The cup was won by CVV Velocitas, beating Ajax Leiden 3–1 in the final.

== Format ==
All ties were played in one game, and if the result was a draw, two extra periods of 7½ minutes were played to determine the winner. If there was no winner after that, another extra period of two extra periods of 7½ minutes was played, and if there was still no decision after that, the game was replayed on the opponent's pitch, and if the draw persisted, then the game goes into extra time until a goal was scored.

The second edition of the KNVB Cup was much better organized than the first, as it had only had two withdrawals during the season.

== Results ==
=== First round ===
==== District 1 ====
Team 1	Score	Team 2
Quick Amsterdam	3–1	Swift Amsterdam
RAP Amsterdam	2–1	EDO Amsterdam
Volharding Amsterdam	3–3 (E.T.)	USV Hercules
Volharding Amsterdam	5–0	USV Hercules
AVV Amsterdam	bye	

Note: USV Hercules did not compete

==== District 2 ====
Team 1	Score	Team 2
HVV Den Haag	5–2	HBS Craeyenhout
DSV Concordia Delft	0–4	HFC Haarlem
RV & AV Neptunus	1–0	Celeritas Rotterdam
Ajax Leiden	Bye	

==== District 3 ====
Team 1	Score	Team 2
CVV Velocitas	8–0	BVV Breda
Dordrechtsche FC	1–4	Rapiditas Rotterdam
Sparta Rotterdam	7–0	RC &VV Volharding
Olympia Middelburg	Bye	

=== District 4 ===
Team 1	Score	Team 2
Quick 1888	1–1 (E.T.)	Go Ahead Wageningen
Go Ahead Wageningen	3–1	Quick 1888
EFC Prinses Wilhelmina	Bye	
Vitesse Arnheim	Bye	
Koninklijke UD 1875	Bye	

=== Second round ===
Team 1	Score	Team 2
Volharding Amsterdam	0–2	RAP Amsterdam
Quick Amsterdam	1–0	AVV Amsterdam
RV & AV Neptunus	0–5	Ajax Leiden
HFC Haarlem	2–6	HVV Den Haag
Rapiditas Rotterdam	1–3	CVV Velocitas
Sparta Rotterdam	5–0	Olympia Middelburg
Go Ahead Wageningen	3–1	Vitesse Arnheim
EFC Prinses Wilhelmina	1–3	Koninklijke UD 1875

Note: Without a fight, he did not compete in the Olympics

=== Quarterfinals ===
Team 1	Score	Team 2
Sparta Rotterdam	3–1	Go Ahead Wageningen
Ajax Leiden	2–1	RAP Amsterdam
CVV Velocitas	3–2	HVV Den Haag
Koninklijke UD 1875	2–0	Quick Amsterdam

=== Semi-finals ===
Team 1	Score	Team 2
CVV Velocitas	2–1	Sparta Rotterdam
Ajax Leiden	2–1	Koninklijke UD 1875

=== Final ===
The final, which took place on 1 April in Rotterdam, was contested by Ajax Leiden and the surprising package CVV Velocitas from Breda, the club of the local military academy. It was, therefore, a team made of soldiers who came from all over the country to Breda for their training, including Amsterdam, The Hague, Arnhem, and Apeldoorn. On its way to the final, Velocitas defeated HVV Den Haag 3–2 in the quarter-finals and Sparta Rotterdam 2–1 in the semifinals.

Despite having a strong start, Ajax soon had to retreat and play on the defensive, with the Dutch newspaper De Telegraaf particularly praising Ajax's goalkeeper Cramer and his ability to clear dangerous balls. Velocitas' goalkeeper, on the other hand, makes a much poorer performance, being at fault in Ajax's opening goal after misjudging a clearance. This prompted Velocitas to press before the break, but despite creating multiple chances and even deserving the equalizer, they failed to do so.

In the second-half, however, Velocitas came out with renewed spirits and "showed us a game so beautiful, so sure, that for a moment we thought we were watching a distinguished English eleven-man team at work", scoring three goals via Clifford (twice) and Altinck du Cloux, thus sealing a 3–1 victory. In doing so, Velocitas became the first club from the south to win an important match against a club from Randstad. Velocitas' goalkeeper, Paul de Groot, did not had to touch a single ball after the break, mainly thanks to the work of his full-back Herman Gerth van Wijk.

1 April 1900
Final

CVV Velocitas	3 – 1 (a.e.t.)	Ajax Leiden
Clifford 1–1'; Altinck du Cloux 2–1'; Clifford 80' de Groot; Gerth van Wijk, Van Teijn; Meijhuijzen, Verment, Warnsinck; Visser, De Koningh, Clifford, Altinck du Cloux, Reiche	Report	Van Zanten 15' Kramer; A. Adam, J. Adam; De Stoppelaar, Grivel, Leegstra; Van Zanten, La Fontaine, Dijckmeester, Koolemans, Hesselink.

Schuttersveld Crooswijk, Rotterdam, Netherlands
Referee: J. L. F. de Meijere

== Aftermatch ==
When Velocitas returned to Breda, they were welcomed by a huge partying crowd. Despite winning the KNVB Cup, Velocitas eventually disappeared.
