= Eddie Croak =

American soccer player (1900–1984)

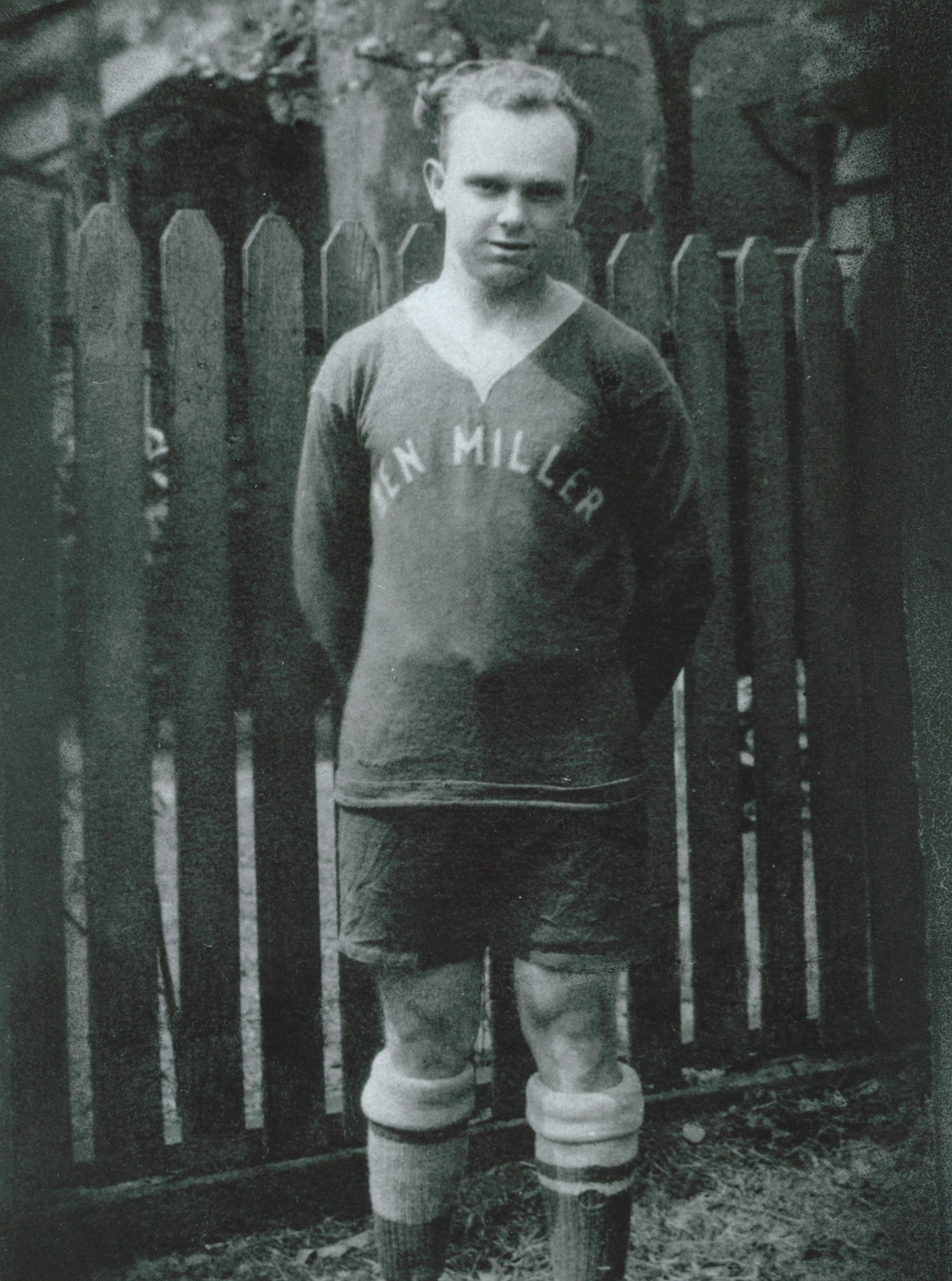
- Eddie Croak of the Ben Millers Soccer Club
- Born: Edward Patrick Croak; September 19, 1900; St. Louis, Missouri, U.S.
- Died: February 24, 1984 (aged 83); St. Louis, Missouri, U.S.
- Years active: 1919–1935
- Spouse: Kathleen Ayers

Edward Patrick “Eddie" Croak (September 19, 1900 – February 24, 1984) was an American professional soccer player and manager. Croak played center half back.

Croak played professionally in St. Louis with the Ben Millers. He also played for the 1920 National Challenge Cup Championship team and started for the 1926 National Challenge Cup runners-up.

Croak is a member of the St. Louis Soccer Hall of Fame.

== Career ==
Croak was born in St. Louis, Missouri. He started playing for the Ben Millers in the St. Louis Soccer League in 1919. Croak stood 5'5" and played at 160 pounds. In spite of his size, he was known as a "Chopper", a tough, physical player. In 1933, he became a manager-player for the team. Croak retired from playing soccer when the Ben Millers disbanded in 1935.

Croak served on the U.S. Olympic Soccer Selection Committee until 1960, when he recused himself as his son Ronald was under consideration for the squad.

== Personal life ==
Croak was born in St. Louis on September 19, 1900. He was married to Kathleen Ayers for more than 50 years; the couple had two daughters and three sons.

Croak died in 1984 in St. Louis.

== Honors ==
- Member 1920 National Challenge Cup Championship team
- Member 1926 National Challenge Cup Championship runners-up
- Elected to St. Louis Soccer Hall of Fame in 1973
