= Harold Lane (Kansas politician) =

American politician

Member of the Kansas House of Representatives from the 58th district
- In office August 20, 2003 – October 31, 2015
- Preceded by: Rocky Nichols
- Succeeded by: Ben Scott

Personal details
- Born: July 1, 1954 Topeka, Kansas, U.S.
- Died: June 22, 2025 Topeka, Kansas, U.S.
- Party: Democratic
- Spouse: Jane
- Children: 2

Harold Lane (July 1, 1954) was a Democratic politician, and a former member of the Kansas House of Representatives, representing the 58th district. He was initially appointed to finish the term of Rocky Nichols in 2003. Lane retired from the House on October 31, 2015.

== Career ==
Lane, along with his wife Jane, owned and operated Lane's Barbecue. They have two children, Dan and Laurie, and five grandchildren Ava, Ryan, Adam, Aaron, and Autumn.

He has worked with a number of community organizations, including the Helping Hands Capitol Improvement Board, YMCA Board, Historic Topeka Board, and the Friends of Free State.

On October 11, 2015, Lane posted to his Facebook account announcing his retirement effective October 31, 2015.

== Committee memberships ==
- Appropriations
- Federal and State Affairs
- Education Budget (Ranking Member)
- Joint Committee on Information Technology
- Select Committee on KPERS

== Major donors ==
The top 5 donors to Lane's 2008 campaign:

- 1. Kansas Contractors Assoc $1,000
- 2. Kansans for Lifesaving Cures $750
- 3. Kansas National Education Assoc $750
- 4. Kansas Optometric Assoc $700
- 5. Northeast KS Building & Construction Trades Council PAC $500
