= Jack Bradshaw =

English footballer

Personal information
- Full name: John Henry Bradshaw
- Date of birth: 28 June 1892
- Place of birth: Burnley, England
- Date of death: 1970 (aged 77–78)
- Position: Outside forward

Senior career*
Years	Team	Apps	(Gls)
	Southend United	?	(?)
	Watford	?	(?)
	Luton Town	?	(?)
	Aberdare Athletic	?	(?)
1921–1922	Queens Park Rangers	5	(0)
1922	Burnley	0	(0)
1922–1923	Southend United	1	(0)
1923–1924	Swansea Town	0	(0)
- * Club domestic league appearances and goals

John Henry Bradshaw (28 June 1892 – 1970) was an English professional footballer who played as an outside forward. He was born in Burnley, Lancashire, but started his career in the Southern League with Southend United. Bradshaw went on to play for Watford, Luton Town and Aberdare Athletic before joining Football League Third Division South side Queens Park Rangers in 1921. After making five league appearances for the club, he was signed by his hometown club Burnley in the summer of 1922. However, Bradshaw failed to break into the first team at Turf Moor and returned to Southend United, who had by that time joined the Third Division South. He played one league match for Southend before joining Swansea Town at the start of the 1923–24 season. After again failing to make an appearance for the club, he retired from professional football in 1924.
