= Clarence Gregory =

English footballer

Personal information
- Full name: Clarence Gregory
- Date of birth: 27 October 1900
- Place of birth: Aston Manor, England
- Date of death: 1975 (aged 74–75)
- Height: 5 ft 9 in (1.75 m)
- Position: Winger

Senior career*
Years	Team	Apps	(Gls)
1919–1920	Wellington Town		
1920–1922	Sunderland	1	(0)
1922–1923	Queens Park Rangers	24	(1)
1923–1924	Yeovil & Petters United		
1924–1925	Wellington Town		
1925–1926	Hereford United		
1926–1927	Leamington Town		
1927–19??	Rugby Town		
- * Club domestic league appearances and goals

Clarence Gregory (27 October 1900 – 1975) was an English professional footballer who played as a winger for Sunderland.
