= Bob Bolam =

English footballer

Personal information
- Full name: Robert Coltman Bolam
- Date of birth: 28 February 1896
- Place of birth: Birtley, County Durham, England
- Date of death: 20 June 1964 (aged 68)
- Place of death: Gateshead, County Durham, England
- Height: 5 ft 8 in (1.73 m)
- Position: Outside right

Senior career*
Years	Team	Apps	(Gls)
–	Birtley		
19??–1922	Sheffield United	33	(2)
1922–1923	Darlington	12	(2)
1923–1924	South Shields	32	(1)
1924–1925	Queens Park Rangers	2	(0)
- * Club domestic league appearances and goals

Robert Coltman Bolam (28 February 1896 – 20 June 1964) was an English footballer who made 79 appearances in the Football League playing as an outside forward, mainly at outside right, for Sheffield United, Darlington, South Shields and Queens Park Rangers.

== Life and career ==
Bolam was the eighth of nine children of William Bolam, a general labourer, and his wife Margaret Agnes. He was born and raised in Birtley, County Durham, and at the time of the 1911 Census, was working as a driver in a colliery. He served in the Royal Navy during the First World War.

After the war, Bolam joined Football League First Division club Sheffield United. He made his debut in a 2–0 win against then league leaders, West Bromwich Albion, in February 1920, and in March, he scored, as well as creating several chances, in a 3–2 defeat at Sunderland in Charles Buchan's benefit match. According to the Telegraph and Star, "he is speedy and invariably puts across a good ball, whilst his ability to use both feet enables him to meet his man with confidence and success". But he was unable to keep his place, and at the end of the 1921–22 season, was not included on the club's retained list, and signed for Darlington of the Third Division.

He went straight into the starting eleven, and opened the scoring in a 4–0 defeat of Accrington Stanley in his second match, but soon lost his place, played only 12 games over the season, and moved on again, this time to South Shields. A match preview in the Derby Daily Telegraph suggested his problem was temperamental: he "can play on either wing, and in the mood can be really dangerous, but he allows himself to become irritated, and goes off his game very easily." He began well for South Shields, with the only goal of the Second Division fixture against Blackpool, and played regularly, making 32 league appearances, but still left for yet another club at the end of the season. He played twice in the Third Division South for Queens Park Rangers, and retired from football in the summer of 1925.

Bolam returned to the north-east of England, where he had married Mary Nicholson in 1924. He died in hospital in Gateshead in 1964 at the age of 68.
