= Ernie Symes =

English footballer

Personal information
- Full name: Herbert Charles Symes
- Date of birth: 22 August 1892
- Place of birth: Fulham, England
- Date of death: June 1977 (aged 84)
- Place of death: London, England
- Position: Left back

Senior career*
Years	Team	Apps	(Gls)
- Acton
1920–1922	Fulham	6	(0)
1923	Aberdare Athletic	31	(0)
1924–1925	Queens Park Rangers	26	(0)
- Margate
- Grays Thurrock
- * Club domestic league appearances and goals

Herbert Charles Symes (22 August 1892 – June 1977) was an English professional football left back who appeared in the Football League for Aberdare Athletic, Queens Park Rangers and Fulham.

== Career statistics ==
Appearances and goals by club, season and competition
Club	Season	League			FA Cup		Total	
Club	Season	Division	Apps	Goals	Apps	Goals	Apps	Goals
Queens Park Rangers	1924–25	Third Division South	8	0	0	0	8	0
Queens Park Rangers	1925–26	Third Division South	18	0	4	0	22	0
Career total			26	0	4	0	30	0
