= Jimmy Keen =

English footballer (1895–1980)

Personal information
- Full name: James Frederick Keen
- Date of birth: 25 December 1895
- Place of birth: Walker, Newcastle upon Tyne, England
- Date of death: 1980 (aged 84–85)
- Position: Winger

Senior career*
Years	Team	Apps	(Gls)
1919	Walker Celtic		
1919–1920	Carlisle United		
1920–1922	Bristol City	9	(1)
1922–1923	Newcastle United	2	(0)
1923–1924	Queens Park Rangers	31	(0)
1924–1925	Hull City	17	(0)
1925	Darlington	0	(0)
1925–1926	Wigan Borough	12	(0)
1926	Walker Celtic		
Total		71	(1)
- * Club domestic league appearances and goals

James Frederick Keen (25 December 1895 – 1980) was an English footballer who played in the Football League for Bristol City, Hull City, Newcastle United, Queens Park Rangers and Wigan Borough.
