= Harry Lane (footballer, born 1894) =

English footballer

Personal information
- Full name: Harry William Lane
- Date of birth: 23 October 1894
- Place of birth: Stoney Stanton, England
- Height: 5 ft 11 1/2 in (1.82 m)
- Positions: Inside right; utility player

Senior career*
Years	Team	Apps	(Gls)
- Stoney Stanton Swifts
–1912	Hinckley United		
1912–1914	Nottingham Forest	0	(0)
1914–1915	Notts County	0	(0)
- Sutton Town
1919–1921	West Ham United	19	(0)
1921–1922	Charlton Athletic	3	(0)
1922–1923	Queens Park Rangers	5	(0)
- * Club domestic league appearances and goals

Harry William Lane (born 23 October 1894) was an English professional footballer who played as an inside right in the Football League for West Ham United, Queens Park Rangers and Charlton Athletic.

== Personal life ==
During the First World War, Lane enlisted as a despatch rider and later became a pilot in the Royal Flying Corps. He achieved a BA in Law after the war.

== Career statistics ==
Appearances and goals by club, season and competition
Club	Season	League			FA Cup		Other		Total	
Club	Season	Division	Apps	Goals	Apps	Goals	Apps	Goals	Apps	Goals
West Ham United	1919–20	Second Division	9	0	0	0	―		9	0
West Ham United	1920–21	Second Division	10	0	0	0	―		10	0
West Ham United	Total		19	0	0	0	―		19	0
Charlton Athletic	1921–22	Third Division South	3	0	0	0	―		3	0
Queens Park Rangers	1922–23	Third Division South	5	0	0	0	0	0	5	0
Career total			27	0	0	0	0	0	27	0
