= Alex Ramsay =

English footballer (1899–1957)

Personal information
- Full name: Alexander Parrott Ramsay
- Date of birth: 1899
- Place of birth: Gateshead, England
- Date of death: 1957 (aged 57–58)
- Place of death: Newcastle-upon-Tyne, England
- Position: Outside left

Senior career*
Years	Team	Apps	(Gls)
1917–1918	Spen Black & White		
1918–1919	Swalwell		
1919–1921	Newcastle United	34	(2)
1921–1922	Queens Park Rangers	6	(0)
- Aberaman Athletic
- * Club domestic league appearances and goals

Alexander Parrott Ramsay (1899–1957) was an English professional footballer who played as an outside left in the Football League for Newcastle United and Queens Park Rangers.

== Personal life ==
Ramsay served as a gunner in the Machine Gun Corps during the First World War.

== Career statistics ==
Appearances and goals by club, season and competition
Club	Season	League			FA Cup		Other		Total	
Club	Season	Division	Apps	Goals	Apps	Goals	Apps	Goals	Apps	Goals
Newcastle United	1919–20	First Division	32	2	2	0	―		34	2
Newcastle United	1920–21	First Division	2	0	1	0	―		3	0
Newcastle United	Total		34	2	3	0	―		37	2
Queens Park Rangers	1921–22	Third Division South	6	0	0	0	1 (Note: Appearance in London Challenge Cup)	0	7	0
Career total			40	2	3	0	1	0	44	2
