= Harry Dobinson =

English footballer (1898–1990)

Personal information
- Full name: Harold Dobinson
- Date of birth: 2 March 1898
- Place of birth: Darlington, England
- Date of death: 1990 (aged 92)
- Place of death: Plymouth, England
- Height: 5 ft 9 1/2 in (1.77 m)
- Position: Centre forward

Senior career*
Years	Team	Apps	(Gls)
- Sunderland West End
1921–1922	Durham City	15	(5)
1922–1923	Burnley	2	(0)
1923–1924	Queens Park Rangers	2	(0)
1924–192?	Thornley Albion		
1928–19??	Heaton-on-Tyne SC		
- * Club domestic league appearances and goals

Harold Dobinson (2 March 1898 – 1990) was an English professional footballer who played as a centre forward in the Football League for Durham City, Burnley and Queens Park Rangers.

== Life and career ==
Dobinson was born in 1898 in Darlington, County Durham, the son of Thomas William Dobinson, a porter, and his wife Annie. He attended Darlington Grammar School, where he played for the school football team, before joining the Army in 1915. He served in France with 52 Brigade Royal Field Artillery as well as playing for the Brigade's football team. After the war, he worked as a shipyard clerk, played football as an amateur for Sunderland West End, and established a reputation in Yorkshire and the north-east of England as a middle-distance runner.

Dobinson signed for Durham City ahead of their first season in the Football League. He made his debut on 3 September 1921, playing at centre forward in a 2–0 win at home to Southport in Durham's second match in the newly formed Northern Section of the Third Division. His first Football League goal came in his sixth appearance, on 22 October in a 7–3 loss to his home-town club of Darlington, and by Christmas he had five goals from a dozen matches.

Amid interest from First Division clubs including Aston Villa and Everton, Dobinson signed for Burnley on 13 January 1922, for a reported fee of £600. He made his top-flight debut the following day, away to Aston Villa, and the Athletic News' Birmingham correspondent "felt sorry for [the debutant], who could scarcely hope to shine in such company and on such a field". He kept his place for the visit to Arsenal, which ended goalless, and thereafter played for the reserves, scoring five goals from 17 Central League matches in what remained of the season. Dobinson's services were retained for the 1922–23 season, but they were mainly employed in helping the "A" team win the North-East Lancashire Combination title.

After a trial with Third Division North club Chesterfield came to nothing, Dobinson signed for Queens Park Rangers of the Southern Section in June 1923. Playing in the Football Combination against West Ham United reserves in August, he trod on the ball and injured himself badly enough to be unable to train for several weeks. He made his first-team debut on 22 October in a 3–0 defeat away to Northampton Town, but, as at Burnley, he played mainly reserve-team football. His only other league match – his last in the Football League – was away to Luton Town in February 1924. At the end of the season, he returned to local football in the north-east with Thornley Albion, In 1928, he was granted a permit to play for amateur club Heaton-on-Tyne SC.

Dobinson married Doris Taylor in 1929. The 1939 Register finds the couple living in Plymouth, Devon, where Dobinson was working as a departmental clerical officer. He died in Plymouth in 1990 at the age of 92.
