= Harry Brown (footballer, born 1897) =

English footballer

Personal information
- Full name: Harold Archer Brown
- Date of birth: 16 September 1897
- Place of birth: Shildon, England
- Date of death: 1958 (aged 60–61)
- Position: Centre forward

Senior career*
Years	Team	Apps	(Gls)
- Shildon Athletic
1922	Sunderland	6	(1)
- Leadgate Park
- Chilton Colliery Recreation Athletic
- Shildon
1924–1925	Queens Park Rangers	13	(3)
- * Club domestic league appearances and goals

Harold Archer "Harry" Brown (16 September 1897 – 1958) was an English footballer who played as a centre forward for various clubs in the 1920s, including Sunderland and Queens Park Rangers.
