= Ernie Grimsdell =

English footballer (1892–1947)

Personal information
- Full name: Ernest Frederick Grimsdell
- Date of birth: 18 August 1892
- Place of birth: Watford, England
- Date of death: 20 September 1947 (aged 55)
- Place of death: Bushey, England
- Position: Left back

Youth career
- St Stephen's

Senior career*
Years	Team	Apps	(Gls)
1909–1910	Watford		
- Watford Orient
1910–1914	St Albans City	69	(16)
1913	Reading		
1913–1920	Watford	15	(0)
1917–1919	→ Fulham (guest)	39	
1920–1921	Queens Park Rangers	20	(0)
1921–1922	Guildford City		
1922–1923	Queens Park Rangers	2	(0)
1923–	Chatham		
–1927	Dartford		

International career
1914	England Amateurs	2	(0)
- * Club domestic league appearances and goals

Ernest Frederick Grimsdell (18 August 1892 – 20 September 1947) was an English professional footballer who played in the Football League for Queens Park Rangers as a left back. He had a long association with Southern League club Watford and was capped by England at amateur level. Grimsdell later became a referee and joined the Football League linesman list in 1932.

== Personal life ==
Grimsdell's younger brother Arthur also became a footballer. Both served in the 1st Regiment of Life Guards and the Guards Machine Gun Regiment on the Western Front during the First World War, with Ernie holding the rank of corporal. He was demobilised in April 1919. Later in life, Grimsdell worked in various government departments.

== Career statistics ==
Appearances and goals by club, season and competition
Club	Season	League			FA Cup		Other		Total	
Club	Season	Division	Apps	Goals	Apps	Goals	Apps	Goals	Apps	Goals
St Albans City	1910–11	Spartan League	15	4	4	0	6 (Note: 3 appearances and 2 goals in Herts Senior Cup, 2 appearances in FA Amateur Cup, 1 appearance in Herts Charity Cup)	2	25	6
St Albans City	1911–12	Spartan League	23	6	2	2	4 (Note: 3 appearances in Herts Charity Cup, 1 appearance in FA Amateur Cup)	0	29	8
St Albans City	1912–13	Spartan League	18	3	2	1	8 (Note: 6 appearances and 2 goals in FA Amateur Cup, 2 appearances and 1 goal in Herts Charity Cup)	3	28	7
St Albans City	1913–14	Spartan League	13	3	1	0	2 (Note: Appearances in Herts Charity Cup)	0	16	3
St Albans City	Total		69	16	9	3	20	5	98	24
Reading	1912–13	Southern League Premier Division	1	0	0	0	―		1	0
Watford	1913–14	Southern League Premier Division	9	0	0	0	―		9	0
Watford	1914–15	Southern League Premier Division	1	0	0	0	―		1	0
Watford	1919–20	Southern League Premier Division	5	0	0	0	―		5	0
Watford	Total		15	0	0	0	―		15	0
Queens Park Rangers	1920–21	Third Division	20	0	1	0	―		21	0
Queens Park Rangers	1921–22	Third Division South	2	0	0	0	―		2	0
Queens Park Rangers	Total		22	0	1	0	―		23	0
Career total			106	16	10	3	20	5	136	24

== Honours ==
St Albans City

- Spartan League: 1911–12
- Herts Charity Cup: 1912–13
