= Albert Read (footballer) =

English footballer

Personal information
- Full name: Albert Read
- Date of birth: 30 March 1893
- Place of birth: Ealing, England
- Date of death: 26 October 1959 (aged 66)
- Place of death: New Cross, London, England
- Height: 5 ft 9 in (1.75 m)
- Position: Right half

Senior career*
Years	Team	Apps	(Gls)
- Hanwell
- Uxbridge
1919–1921	Tufnell Park		
1921–1922	Queens Park Rangers		
1922–1923	Reading		
1923–1924	Sittingbourne		
- Maidstone United

International career
1921	England	1	(0)
	England Amateurs	2	
- * Club domestic league appearances and goals

Albert Read (30 March 1893 – 26 October 1959) was an English international footballer who played as a right half.

== Early life ==
Albert Read was born in Ealing, the third of four children. By 1911, Read was working as a motor mechanic.

== Career ==
Read spent his early career with Hanwell and Uxbridge. He joined the Army in September 1914, as a signalman and a gunner in the Royal Field Artillery, before becoming a pilot for the Royal Air Force in 1918, prior to being demobilised in March 1919. Read later played for Tufnell Park, Queens Park Rangers, Reading, Sittingbourne, and Maidstone United. With Tufnell Park he was a runner up in the FA Amateur Cup in the 1919–20 season.

He earned one cap for England in 1921. He also made two appearances for the England amateur team.

== Later life and death ==
Read married in 1922, and had one son born in 1933. By 1939 he was working as an engineer's draughtsman. He died on 26 October 1959 at New Cross General Hospital, aged 66.
