= Roy Faulkner =

Soccer player (1897–?)

Personal information
- Full name: Robert Faulkner
- Date of birth: 5 August 1897
- Place of birth: Paisley, Scotland
- Position: Outside right

Senior career*
| Years | Team | Apps | (Gls) |
- St Anthony's
- Maryhill
| 1919–1920 | Blackburn Rovers | 9 | (0) |
| 1920–1922 | Queens Park Rangers | 50 | (1) |
| 1922–1923 | South Shields | 18 | (0) |
| 1924–1925 | Toronto Clarkes | | |
| 1925–1926 | Philadelphia | 6 | (0) |
| 1927–1928 | Providence | 2 | (0) |
- Toronto Ulster United

International career
| 1925–1926 | Canada | 3 | (1) |
- * Club domestic league appearances and goals

Robert "Roy" Faulkner (born 5 August 1897) was a soccer player. Born in Scotland, he earned three caps for the Canadian national side between 1925 and 1926, scoring one goal.

Born in Paisley, Scotland, Faulkner played club football for Glasgow junior teams St Anthony's and Maryhill, in England for Blackburn Rovers, Queens Park Rangers and South Shields, in Canada for Toronto Clarkes and Toronto Ulster United, and in the American Soccer League with Philadelphia and Providence.
