= Ernie Butler (footballer, born 1896) =

English footballer (1896–1979)

Personal information
- Full name: Ernest Butler
- Date of birth: 17 June 1896
- Place of birth: Stillington, England
- Date of death: 1979 (aged 83–84)
- Position: Winger

Senior career*
Years	Team	Apps	(Gls)
1919–1921	Scunthorpe & Lindsey United		
1921–1922	Ebbw Vale		
1922–1924	Queens Park Rangers	33	(0)
1924–1926	Hartlepools United	58	(4)
1926–1928	Durham City	65	(10)
Total		156	(14)
- * Club domestic league appearances and goals

Ernest Butler (17 June 1896 – 1979) was an English footballer who played in the Football League for Durham City, Hartlepools United and Queens Park Rangers.
