= Harry Edgley =

English footballer (1891–1966)

Personal information
- Full name: Harold Edgley
- Date of birth: 30 November 1891
- Place of birth: Crewe, England
- Date of death: 1966 (aged 74–75)
- Position: Winger

Senior career*
Years	Team	Apps	(Gls)
1909–1911	Whitchurch		
1911–1920	Aston Villa	75	(15)
1912	→ Stourbridge (loan)		
1921–1923	Queens Park Rangers	69	(6)
1923–1924	Stockport County	29	(4)
1924	Worcester City		
Total		173	(25)
- * Club domestic league appearances and goals

Harold Edgley (30 November 1891 – 1966) was an English footballer who played in the Football League for Aston Villa, Queens Park Rangers and Stockport County.

He made his debut for the club during the 1911–12 Aston Villa F.C. season. He scored in his final season in a 3–0 home victory against Oldham.
