= Len Hill (footballer) =

English footballer (1899–1979)

Personal information
- Full name: Leonard George Hill
- Date of birth: 15 February 1899
- Place of birth: Islington, England
- Date of death: 10 October 1979 (aged 80)
- Place of death: Southend-on-Sea, England
- Height: 5 ft 11 in (1.80 m)
- Position: Goalkeeper

Youth career
- Cranley Rovers

Senior career*
Years	Team	Apps	(Gls)
1919–1920	Southend United	0	(0)
1920–1925	Queens Park Rangers	162	(10)
1925–1926	Southampton	10	(0)
1926–1927	Rochdale	34	(0)
1927–1929	Lincoln City	69	(0)
1929–19??	Grays Thurrock		
- * Club domestic league appearances and goals

Leonard George Hill (15 February 1899 – 10 October 1979) was an English professional footballer who played as a goalkeeper for various clubs in the 1920s, spending the largest part of his career with Queens Park Rangers in the Football League Third Division.

== Football career ==
Hill was born in Islington and after seeing military service in the First World War, he joined Southend United as an amateur in 1919.

He moved to Queens Park Rangers in August 1920 and remained at the Loftus Road club for five years, in which he made 176 appearances of which 162 were in League matches, either in the Third Division or the Third Division South.

In June 1925, he joined Southampton of the Second Division as understudy to Tommy Allen. Hill played in goal for the first four matches of the 1925–26 season, all of which ended in defeats, with 11 goals conceded. At this time, the club had no manager, and the directors decided to replace Hill with Harry Yeomans.

Southampton were drawn against First Division Liverpool in the third round of the FA Cup in January 1926. In the first match, at The Dell, Allen was in goal when he collided with his teammate Michael Keeping and had to leave the pitch with bruised ribs. Arthur Bradford took over in goal for the remainder of the match, which ended goalless. For the replay, Allen was replaced by Hill who was unable to prevent Liverpool winning 1–0. Hill kept his place until Allen returned to the team at the end of February, and was not selected again.

In the summer of 1926, Hill left The Dell and dropped back down to the Third Division in search of regular first-team football with Rochdale. A year later, he was on the move again to Lincoln City, where he spent two seasons before winding down his career with Grays Thurrock in the Southern League Eastern Division.
