= James Birch (footballer) =

English footballer

James Robert Birch
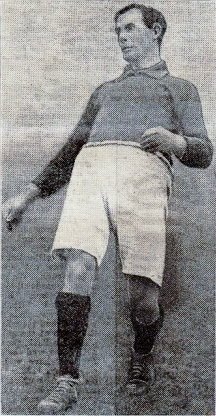
- Birch in 1920

Personal information
- Full name: James Robert Birch
- Date of birth: 1888
- Place of birth: Blackwell, England
- Date of death: 1940 (aged 51–52)
- Position: Forward

Youth career
- 1907–1911: Stourbridge

Senior career*
Years	Team	Apps	(Gls)
1911–1912	Aston Villa	3	(2)
1912–1926	Queens Park Rangers	334	(125)
1926	Brentford	0	(0)
- * Club domestic league appearances and goals

James Robert Birch (1888–1940) was an English footballer who played mainly with Queens Park Rangers.

Birch was signed by QPR manager James Cowan from his former club Aston Villa. Birch had scored 49 goals for Villa's reserves in two seasons but was only a fringe player at the Midlands club, and this form prompted Rangers to sign him in 1912. Birch was small in stature – only 5 feet 7 inches – but he was a stocky and bustling inside-forward. He made his debut in the September against Plymouth Argyle and scored both goals in a 2–1 win. Had the First World War not intervened it is very possible that he would have played in excess of 500 games for QPR and ended up as the club's all-time leading scorer. Although never really prolific he was an extremely consistent goalscorer who could usually be relied on to score 15+ a season.

He went on to play 334 league games (363 in all competitions) for Rangers, scoring 125 league goals (144 in all). He stands third in the all-time list of leading scorers at QPR. In 1926 he was transferred to Brentford.
