= 1912–13 Aston Villa F.C. season =

English football club season

Aston Villa
1912–13 season
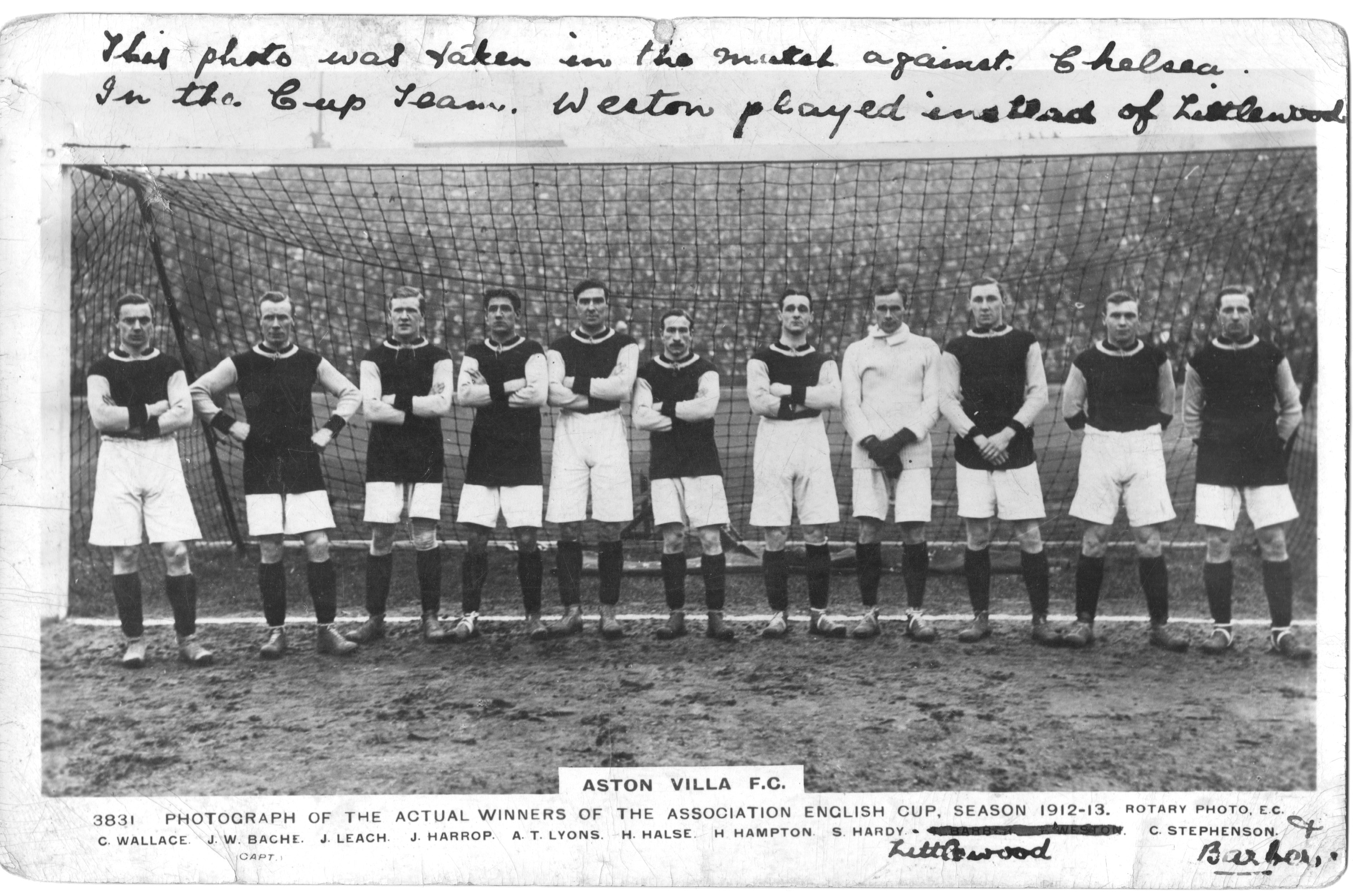
- President: Joseph Ansell
- Chairman: Frederick Rinder
- Manager: George Ramsay
- First Division: 2nd
- FA Cup: Winners
Home colours

1913 FA Cup Final
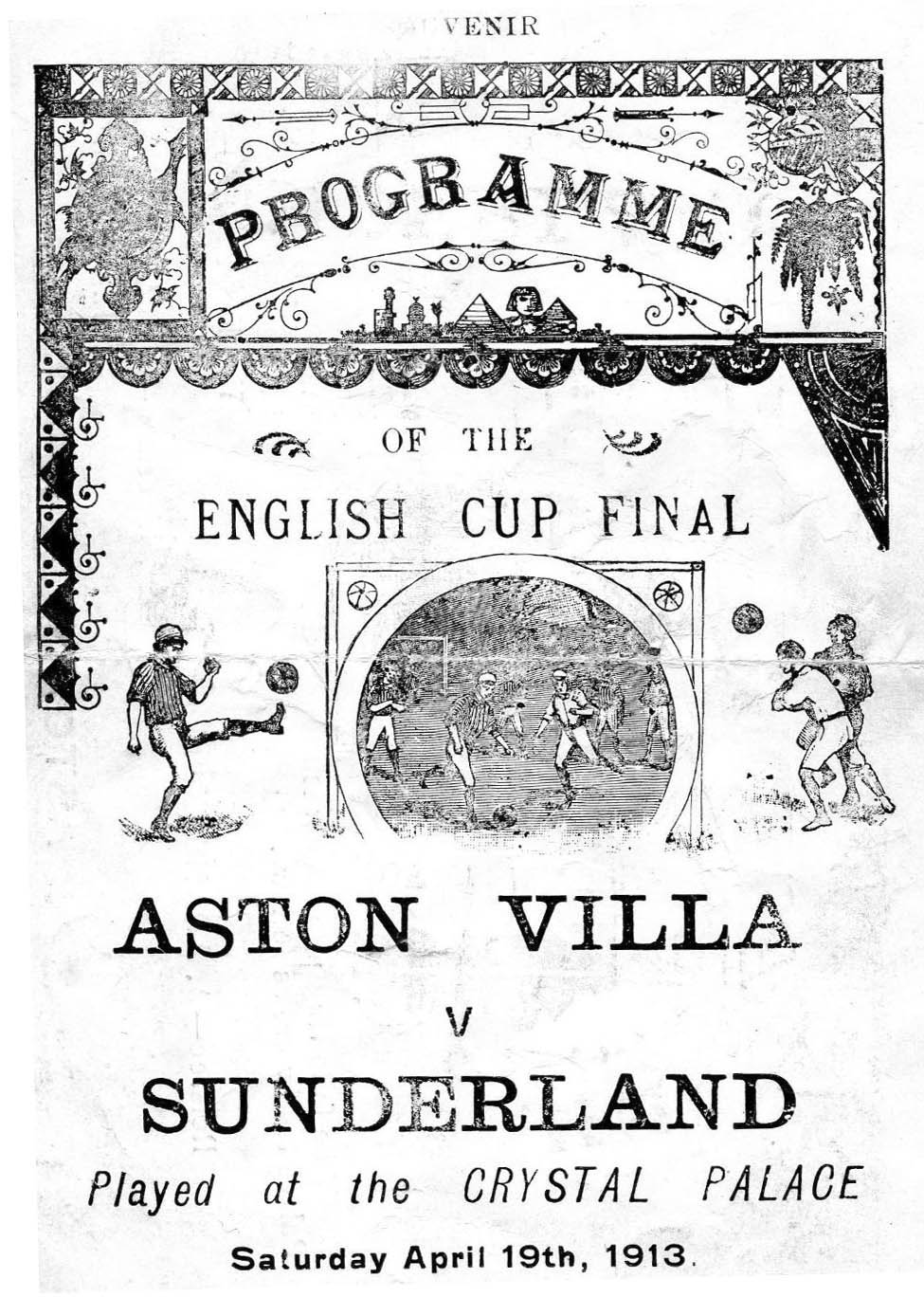
- Programme cover
- Event: 1912–13 FA Cup
| Aston Villa | Sunderland |
| 1 | 0 |
- Date: 19 April 1913
- Venue: Crystal Palace, London
- Referee: A. Adams
- Attendance: 121,919

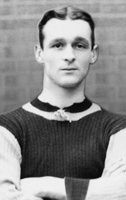
"Happy" Harry Hampton, scored five in 10-0 victory.

The 1912–13 English football season was Aston Villa's 25th season in the Football League. Villa won the FA Cup competition for the fifth time matching the record jointly held with Wanderers F.C. and Blackburn Rovers.

Andy Ducat's ability and success with England brought attention from bigger clubs than Woolwich Arsenal. His then current club was, at the time, going through a financial crisis. Ducat was finally sold for £1,000 to England's most successful club Aston Villa in 1912, having played 188 matches and scored 21 goals for Arsenal. After suffering a broken leg in his first season at Villa, he recovered to become a stalwart in the side, captaining Villa to their sixth FA Cup win in 1919–20,

"Happy" Harry Hampton was a prolific goalscorer and scored five goals when Aston Villa beat Wednesday 10–0 in a First Division match in 1912. "The Wellington Whirlwind," played as a centre forward for Aston Villa from 1904 to 1920.

Tommy Barber scored the winning goal for Aston Villa in the 1913 FA Cup Final.

Sam Hardy became one of the best goalkeepers of his generation while at Liverpool. By the time he was allowed to join Villa in 1912 he had earned himself the nickname 'Safe and Steady Sam'. He had made 239 appearances between the sticks for the Reds before he arrived for £1500. He would go on to win two FA Cups in 1913 and 1920 with Aston Villa. There were also debuts for Harold Halse, Jimmy Harrop, Andy Ducat, Andy McLachlan, Jimmy Leach, Tommy Barber, Arthur Dobson and Stuart Doncaster.

== Final League table ==
| Pos | Team | Pld | W | D | L | GF | GA | GAv | Pts |
|---|---|---|---|---|---|---|---|---|---|
| 1 | Sunderland (C) | 38 | 25 | 4 | 9 | 86 | 43 | 2.000 | 54 |
| 2 | Aston Villa | 38 | 19 | 12 | 7 | 86 | 52 | 1.654 | 50 |
| 3 | The Wednesday | 38 | 21 | 7 | 10 | 75 | 55 | 1.364 | 49 |
| 4 | Manchester United | 38 | 19 | 8 | 11 | 69 | 43 | 1.605 | 46 |
| 5 | Blackburn Rovers | 38 | 16 | 13 | 9 | 79 | 43 | 1.837 | 45 |

Source: World Football
Rules for classification: 1) Points; 2) Goal average; 3) Goals scored
(C) Champions

=== Matches ===
| 2 September 1912 | Aston Villa | 1–0 | Chelsea | Villa Park |
| | Clem Stephenson (1') | Report |

| 7 September 1912 | Aston Villa | 3–1 | Bradford | Villa Park |
| | Harold Halse (5'); Joe Bache (12'); Albert Hall (53') | Report |

| 9 September 1912 | Oldham Athletic | 2–2 | Aston Villa | Boundary Park |
| | | Report | Joe Bache (6'); Charlie Wallace (61' pen) |

| 14 September 1912 | Manchester City | 1–0 | Aston Villa | Hyde Road |
| | | Report |

| 16 September 1912 | Arsenal | 0–3 | Aston Villa | Manor Ground |
| | | Report | Clem Stephenson (8'); Hampton (63', 67') |

| 21 September 1912 | Aston Villa | 2–4 | West Bromwich Albion | Villa Park |
| | Joe Bache (2', 52') | Report |

| 28 September 1912 | Everton | 0–1 | Aston Villa | Goodison Park |
| | | Report | Harold Halse (80') |

| 5 October 1912 | Aston Villa | 10–0 | Sheffield Wednesday | Villa Park |
| | Harold Halse (3'); Hampton (14', 28', 36', 47', 60'); Clem Stephenson (30', 38'); Joe Bache (57', 77') | Report |

| 12 October 1912 | Blackburn Rovers | 2–2 | Aston Villa | Ewood Park |
| | | Report | Harold Halse (75', 80') |

| 19 October 1912 | Aston Villa | 5–1 | Derby County | Villa Park |
| | Harold Halse (6', 8', 61', 81', 87') | Report |

| 26 October 1912 | Tottenham Hotspur | 3–3 | Aston Villa | White Hart Lane |
| | | Report | Harold Halse (22', 64'); Clem Stephenson (85') |

| 2 November 1912 | Aston Villa | 5–1 | Middlesbrough | Villa Park |
| | Charlie Wallace (5' pen); Hampton (20', 82'); Harold Halse (35'); Clem Stephenson (46') | Report |

| 9 November 1912 | Notts County | 1–1 | Aston Villa | Meadow Lane |
| | | | Hampton (5') |

| 16 November 1912 | Aston Villa | 4–2 | Manchester United | Villa Park |
| | Joe Bache (16'); Hampton (30', 40'); Clem Stephenson (51') |

| 23 November 1912 | Sunderland | 3–1 | Aston Villa | Roker Park |
| | | | Hampton (70') |

| 30 November 1912 | Liverpool | 2–0 | Aston Villa | Anfield |

| 7 December 1912 | Aston Villa | 1–1 | Bolton Wanderers | Villa Park |
| | Charlie Wallace (89' pen) |

| 14 December 1912 | Sheffield United | 3–2 | Aston Villa | Bramall Lane |
| | | | Harold Halse (1–0, 35') |

| 21 December 1912 | Aston Villa | 3–1 | Newcastle United | Villa Park |
| | Hampton (22'); Joe Bache (44'); Charlie Wallace (84') |

| 26 December 1912 | Aston Villa | 7–1 | Oldham Athletic | Villa Park |
| | Hampton (8', 44', 61'); Harold Halse (30', 65'); Clem Stephenson (50', 60') |

| 28 December 1912 | Bradford | 1–1 | Aston Villa | Valley Parade |
| | | | Clem Stephenson (62') |
Note: Tommy Barber made his Villa debut.

| 4 January 1913 | Aston Villa | 2–0 | Manchester City | Villa Park |
| | Harold Halse (2'); Hampton (60') |

| 18 January 1913 | West Bromwich Albion | 2–2 | Aston Villa | The Hawthorns |
| | | | Hampton (42'); Jimmy Harrop (85') |

| 25 January 1913 | Aston Villa | 1–1 | Everton | Villa Park |
| | Hampton (31') |

| 8 February 1913 | Sheffield Wednesday | 1–1 | Aston Villa | Owlerton Stadium |
| | | | Albert Hall (43') |

| 15 February 1913 | Aston Villa | 1–1 | Blackburn Rovers | Villa Park |
| | Tommy Barber (4') |

| 1 March 1913 | Aston Villa | 1–0 | Tottenham Hotspur | Villa Park |
| | Andy McLachlan (72') |

| 12 March 1913 | Derby County | 0–1 | Aston Villa | Baseball Ground |
| | | | Clem Stephenson (5') |

| 15 March 1913 | Aston Villa | 1–0 | Notts County | Villa Park |
| | Clem Stephenson (55') |

| 21 March 1913 | Chelsea | 1–2 | Aston Villa | Stamford Bridge |
| | | | Hampton (1–0); Jimmy Leach (2–0) |

| 22 March 1913 | Manchester United | 4–0 | Aston Villa | Old Trafford |

| 24 March 1913 | Aston Villa | 4–1 | Arsenal | Villa Park |
| | Harold Halse (1', 6'); Joe Bache (80'); Albert Hall (90') |

| 5 April 1913 | Aston Villa | 1–3 | Liverpool | Villa Park |
| | Stuart Doncaster (89') |

| 9 April 1913 | Middlesbrough | 1–1 | Aston Villa | Ayresome Park |
| | | | Hampton (21') |

| 12 April 1913 | Bolton Wanderers | 2–3 | Aston Villa | Burnden Park |
| | | | Tommy Barber (58'); Hampton (88'); Clem Stephenson (89') |

| 23 April 1913 | Aston Villa | 1–1 | Sunderland | Villa Park |
| | Harold Halse (1–1) |

| 26 April 1913 | Newcastle United | 1–3 | Aston Villa | St James' Park |
| | | | Clem Stephenson (5'); Charlie Wallace (12'); Hampton (18') |

| 28 April 1913 | Aston Villa | 4–2 | Sheffield United | Villa Park |
| | Charlie Wallace (21', 40'); Andy McLachlan (55'); Hampton (82') |

Source: avfchistory.co.uk

== FA Cup ==
First round

| Tie no | Home team | Score | Away team | Date |
|---|---|---|---|---|
| 13 | Derby County | 1–3 | Aston Villa | 15 January 1913 |

Second round

15 of the 16 second-round matches were played on Saturday 1 February 1913. Four matches were drawn, with the replays taking place in the following midweek . One of these went to a second replay the following week.

| Tie no | Home team | Score | Away team | Date |
|---|---|---|---|---|
| 3 | Aston Villa | 5–0 | West Ham United | 1 February 1913 |

Third round

The eight third-round matches were played on Saturday 22 February 1913. There were two replays, played in the following midweek.

| Tie no | Home team | Score | Away team | Date |
|---|---|---|---|---|
| 4 | Aston Villa | 5–0 | Crystal Palace | 22 February 1913 |

Fourth round

The four fourth-round (quarter-final) matches were played on 8 March 1913. There was one replay, the Tyne-Wear derby between Newcastle United and Sunderland, played on 12 March. This went to a second replay, which Sunderland won.

| Tie no | Home team | Score | Away team | Date |
|---|---|---|---|---|
| 4 | Bradford Park Avenue | 0–5 | Aston Villa | 8 March 1913 |

Semi-finals

29 March 1913

| Aston Villa | 1–0 | Oldham Athletic |

Ewood Park, Blackburn (Blackburn Rovers' ground)

=== Final ===
19 April 1913
15:00 BST

| Aston Villa | 1–0 | Sunderland |
|---|---|---|
| Barber 78' | Report |

Crystal Palace, London
Attendance: 121,919
Referee: Mr. A. Adams (Nottingham)

| Aston Villa | Sunderland |

| GK | (England) Sam Hardy |
| DF | (England) Tom Lyons |
| DF | (England) Tommy Weston |
| MF | (England) Tommy Barber |
| MF | (England) Jimmy Harrop |
| MF | (England) Jimmy Leach |
| FW | (England) Charlie Wallace |
| FW | (England) Clem Stephenson |
| FW | (England) Harry Hampton |
| FW | (England) Harold Halse |
| FW | (England) Joe Bache (c) |
Secretary-Manager:
(Scotland) George Ramsay

| GK | (England) Joe Butler |
| DF | (England) Charlie Gladwin |
| DF | (England) Harry Ness |
| MF | (England) Francis Cuggy |
| MF | (Scotland) Charlie Thomson (c) |
| MF | (Scotland) Harry Low |
| FW | (England) Jackie Mordue |
| FW | (England) Charlie Buchan |
| FW | (Scotland) James Richardson |
| FW | (England) George Holley |
| FW | (England) Henry Martin |
Manager:
(Northern Ireland) Bob Kyle

Match rules

- 90 minutes.
- 30 minutes of extra-time if necessary.
- Replay if scores still level.

== Reserves ==
Aston Villa reserves won the Staffordshire Senior Cup.
