= 1912–13 British Home Championship =

Tournament details
- Host country: England, Ireland, Scotland and Wales
- Dates: 18 January – 5 April 1913
- Teams: 4

Final positions
- Champions: England (19th title)
- Runners-up: Wales

Tournament statistics
- Matches played: 6
- Goals scored: 13 (2.17 per match)
- Top scorer: (Wales) Grenville Morris (3 goals)

The 1912–13 British Home Championship was an international football tournament between the British Home Nations. An evenly matched tournament, all four sides won at least one game and the competition could have gone any way, as Ireland showed the following year when they won their first undisputed championship. In the event, the title went to England courtesy of a single goal victory over Scotland at Stamford Bridge in the final match. Scotland shared second place with Wales after both teams achieved three points and Ireland finished last with two.

Wales began the strongest team, beating Ireland 1–0 in Belfast. Ireland responded well to this defeat, winning against eventual champions England 2–1 in a tough game at Windsor Park. Wales and Scotland played out a scoreless draw in their match, leaving Wales on top of the table temporarily and Scotland flagging. The Scots recovered in their match against Ireland with a 2–1 victory away in Dublin (which featured a riot among supporters after the final whistle) before England recovered after a faltering start to win a gripping match against Wales 4–3 in Bristol. In the final game of the competition, England were trailing Scotland by a single point and knew that a loss could give the title to Scotland and Wales while a draw would leave all three teams sharing the championship. In another tough game, both sides played well but England snatched victory 1–0 and became champions for the third year in a row.

== Table ==
Team	Pld	W	D	L	GF	GA	GD	Pts
England (C)	3	2	0	1	6	5	+1	4
Wales	3	1	1	1	4	4	0	3
Scotland	3	1	1	1	2	2	0	3
Ireland	3	1	0	2	3	4	−1	2

Rules for classification: 1) points. The points system worked as follows: 2 points for a win and 1 point for a draw.
(C) Champions

== Results ==
18 January 1913

Ireland	0–1	Wales
		Roberts 15'

Grosvenor Park, Belfast
Attendance: 12,000
Referee: Arthur Adams (England)

15 February 1913

Ireland	2–1	England
Gillespie 43', 75'		Buchan 10'

Windsor Park, Belfast
Attendance: 20,000
Referee: Alex Pearson (Scotland)

3 March 1913

Wales	0–0	Scotland

Racecourse Ground, Wrexham
Attendance: 8,000
Referee: Isaac Baker (England)

15 March 1913

Ireland	1–2	Scotland
McKnight 42'		Reid 16'; Bennett 32'

Dalymount Park, Dublin
Attendance: 12,000
Referee: Arthur Adams (England)

17 March 1913

England	4–3	Wales
Fleming 27'; Latheron 30'; McCall 35'; Hampton 55'		Davis 10'; Peake 70'; Meredith 52'

Ashton Gate, Bristol
Attendance: 8,000
Referee: Alex Jackson (Scotland)

5 April 1913

England	1–0	Scotland
Hampton 42'

Stamford Bridge, London
Attendance: 52,500
Referee: Alexander A. Jackson (Scotland)

== Winning squad ==
- England

Name	Apps/Goals by opponent			Total	
Name	(Wales) WAL	(Ireland) IRE	(Scotland) SCO	Apps	Goals
Bob Crompton	1	1	1	3	0
Harry Hampton	1/1		1/1	2	2
Harold Fleming	1/1		1	2	1
Joe McCall	1/1		1	2	1
Joe Hodkinson	1		1	2	0
Jesse Pennington	1		1	2	0
Eddie Latheron	1/1			1	1
Charlie Buchan		1/1		1	1
Tom Brittleton			1	1	0
Sam Hardy			1	1	0
George Holley			1	1	0
Jock Simpson			1	1	0
Billy Watson			1	1	0
Bob Benson		1		1	0
Tommy Boyle		1		1	0
Francis Cuggy		1		1	0
George Elliott		1		1	0
John Mordue		1		1	0
Joe Smith		1		1	0
George Utley		1		1	0
George Wall		1		1	0
Tim Williamson		1		1	0
Billy Bradshaw	1			1	0
Hugh Moffat	1			1	0
Ernald Scattergood	1			1	0
Charlie Wallace	1			1	0
