= 1911–12 British Home Championship =

Tournament details
- Host country: England, Ireland, Scotland and Wales
- Dates: 10 February – 13 April 1912
- Teams: 4

Final positions
- Champions: England; Scotland (shared)

Tournament statistics
- Matches played: 6
- Goals scored: 22 (3.67 per match)
- Top scorer(s): (England) Harold John Fleming (England) George Holley (3 goals)

The 1911–12 British Home Championship was a football competition played between the British Home Nations during the second half of the 1911–12 season. England and Scotland shared the title after both beat Wales and Ireland and then drew the deciding match at Hampden Park. Ireland took third place after beating Wales in an exciting 3–2 win away in Cardiff. Wales, who came last with zero points, lost all three matches and conceded six goals.

England began the competition with a 6–1 thrashing of Ireland in Dublin, giving them the immediate advantage and making them favourites for the title, having won four of the previous five tournaments. Scotland too began with a win, a more subdued 1–0 victory over the Welsh. Scotland followed this with a 4–1 win in Belfast, briefly taking the top of the table before England joined them by beating Wales 2–0 in Wrexham. In the deciding game in Glasgow, Scotland and England played out a tough 1–1 draw. As neither side had broken the deadlock, both shared the tournament. In the final match, Wales and Ireland played a gripping game for third place, the Irish taking it by a single goal.

== Table ==
Team	Pld	W	D	L	GF	GA	GD	Pts
England (C)	3	2	1	0	9	2	+7	5
Scotland (C)	3	2	1	0	6	2	+4	5
Ireland	3	1	0	2	5	12	−7	2
Wales	3	0	0	3	2	6	−4	0

Rules for classification: 1) points. The points system worked as follows: 2 points for a win and 1 point for a draw.
(C) Co-champions

== Results ==
10 February 1912

Ireland	1–6	England
Hamill 35'		Fleming 12', 40', 64'; Holley 17'; Freeman 50'; Simpson 85'

Dalymount Park, Dublin
Attendance: 15,000
Referee: Alexander A. Jackson (Scotland)

2 March 1912

Scotland	1–0	Wales
Quinn 87'

Tynecastle Stadium, Edinburgh
Attendance: 32,000
Referee: James Mason (England)

16 March 1912

Ireland	1–4	Scotland
McKnight 42' (pen.)		Aitkenhead 8', 23'; Reid 60'; Walker 70'

Windsor Park, Belfast
Attendance: 12,000
Referee: Herbert S. Bamlett (England)

11 March 1912

Wales	0–2	England
		Holley 2'; Freeman 41'

Racecourse Ground, Wrexham
Attendance: 10,000
Referee: Tom Dougray (Scotland)

23 March 1912

Scotland	1–1	England
Wilson 7'		Holley 13'

Hampden Park, Glasgow
Attendance: 127,307
Referee: James Mason (England)

13 April 1912

Wales	2–3	Ireland
B. Davies 30'; D. Davies 53'		McCandless 61'; Brennan 65'; Thompson 85'

Ninian Park, Cardiff
Attendance: 10,000
Referee: Herbert Bamlett (England)

== Winning squads ==
- England

Name	Apps/Goals by opponent			Total	
Name	(Wales) WAL	(Ireland) IRE	(Scotland) SCO	Apps	Goals
George Holley	1/1	1/1	1/1	3	3
Bert Freeman	1/1	1/1	1	3	2
Jock Simpson	1	1/1	1	3	1
Tom Brittleton	1	1	1	3	0
Bob Crompton	1	1	1	3	0
Jesse Pennington	1	1	1	3	0
William Wedlock	1	1	1	3	0
Frank Jefferis	1		1	2	0
Harry Makepeace	1		1	2	0
Tim Williamson	1		1	2	0
Harold Fleming		1/3		1	3
George Wall			1	1	0
Robert Evans	1			1	0
Billy Bradshaw		1		1	0
Sam Hardy		1		1	0
John Mordue		1		1	0

- Scotland

Name	Apps/Goals by opponent			Total	
Name	(Wales) WAL	(Ireland) IRE	(England) ENG	Apps	Goals
Bobby Walker	1	1/1	1	3	1
Jimmy Brownlie	1	1	1	3	0
Alec McNair	1	1	1	3	0
Jock Walker	1	1	1	3	0
Jimmy Quinn	1/1		1	2	1
Jimmy Gordon		1	1	2	0
Jimmy Hay	1		1	2	0
George Sinclair	1	1		2	0
Bobby Templeton		1	1	2	0
Charlie Thomson	1		1	2	0
Wattie Aitkenhead		1/2		1	2
Andrew Wilson			1/1	1	1
Willie Reid		1/1		1	1
David McLean			1	1	0
Alex Bell		1		1	0
Wilf Low		1		1	0
Jimmy McMenemy	1			1	0
Bob Mercer	1			1	0
George Robertson	1			1	0
