= Henry Martin (footballer) =

English footballer & manager (1891–1974)

Personal information
- Date of birth: 5 December 1891
- Place of birth: Selston, Nottinghamshire, England
- Date of death: 31 December 1974 (aged 83)
- Place of death: Nottingham, Nottinghamshire, England
- Height: 5 ft 11 in (1.80 m)
- Position: Outside left

Youth career
- Sutton Junction

Senior career*
Years	Team	Apps	(Gls)
1912–1922	Sunderland	213	(23)
1922–1925	Nottingham Forest	107	(13)
1925–1930	Rochdale	93	(18)

International career
1914	England	1	(0)

Managerial career
- 1933–1935: Mansfield Town
- * Club domestic league appearances and goals

Henry Martin (5 December 1891 – 1974) was an English professional footballer who played as an outside left for Sunderland, Nottingham Forest and Rochdale. At Sunderland he won the Football League title and reached the Cup Final in 1913. He made one appearance for England in 1914, and was later the manager at Mansfield Town.

== Playing career ==
=== Sunderland ===
Martin was born at Selston, Nottinghamshire and played his youth football with Sutton Junction F.C., based in Sutton-in-Ashfield. He joined Sunderland as a professional in January 1912 and made rapid progress with the club.

His debut came at Anfield on 5 April 1912 when he scored in a 2–1 defeat by Liverpool. The following day he was on the scoresheet again in a 4–0 victory over Everton. The other three goals were scored by George Holley.

He was ever-present in 1912–13 helping Sunderland to win the 1913 Football League Championship. He contributed three league goals in the championship winning season, including another against Liverpool in a 7–0 victory, in which Charlie Buchan scored five. Sunderland narrowly missed out on the Double, losing the FA Cup final 1–0 to Aston Villa, who themselves were runners-up in the League.

The following year he made his debut for England against Ireland on 14 February 1914, when he was joined by his Sunderland colleague Francis Cuggy. The match was played at Ayresome Park, Middlesbrough and England were defeated 3–0. This was the first time that England had been beaten by Ireland on home soil.

His football career was then interrupted by the First World War. During the war he guested for Nottingham Forest and he took part in two of the victory internationals played at the end of the war but he was unable to break back into the full England side.

After the war he played for another three seasons for Sunderland, rarely missing a match before moving to his native county to join Nottingham Forest on a permanent basis. In his Sunderland career he played a total of 230 first team matches with 22 goals.

=== Nottingham Forest ===
He joined Forest in May 1922 and remained with the club for three seasons (again rarely missing a match) as they struggled at the lower end of the First Division table, finally being relegated in 1925.

=== Rochdale ===
In 1925 he dropped down to the Third Division North with Rochdale where he continued to play until 1930, although by then his appearances were more infrequent.

== Coaching and management career ==
In 1929 he had been appointed trainer with Rochdale where he remained until 1933.

In December 1933, he was appointed manager at Mansfield Town in succession to Jack Hickling. 1934–35 saw some improvement in the club's league position when for the first time Town finished in the top half of the Football League Third Division North table, a creditable 8th place overall. He also guided them to the Third Round of the FA Cup, losing to First Division Burnley. At the end of the season, his tenure as manager ended when he was surprisingly sacked and replaced by Charlie Bell.

He then joined Swindon Town as a trainer where he remained until the 1950s.

== Honours ==
Sunderland

- The Football League champions: 1912–13
- FA Cup finalist: 1913
