= 1914–15 Aston Villa F.C. season =

English football club season

Aston Villa
1914–15 season
- President: Joseph Ansell
- Chairman: Frederick Rinder
- Manager: George Ramsay
- First Division: 14th
- FA Cup: Second round
Home colours

The magazine Punch was critical of the decision to allow competitive football to continue after the outbreak of war. Mr Punch is depicted saying to the footballer "No doubt you can make money in this field, my friend, but there's only one field today where you can get honour".

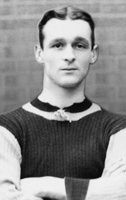
"Happy" Harry Hampton

The 1914–15 English football season was Aston Villa's 27th season in the Football League.

In June 1915, Aston Villa Reserves resigned from the Birmingham & District League in order to become members of the Central League.

== League ==
| Pos | Team | Pld | W | D | L | GF | GA | GAv | Pts |
|---|---|---|---|---|---|---|---|---|---|
| 12 | Middlesbrough | 38 | 13 | 12 | 13 | 62 | 74 | 0.838 | 38 |
| 13 | Liverpool | 38 | 14 | 9 | 15 | 65 | 75 | 0.867 | 37 |
| 14 | Aston Villa | 38 | 13 | 11 | 14 | 62 | 72 | 0.861 | 37 |
| 15 | Newcastle United | 38 | 11 | 10 | 17 | 46 | 48 | 0.958 | 32 |
| 16 | Notts County | 38 | 9 | 13 | 16 | 41 | 57 | 0.719 | 31 |

Source: World Football
Rules for classification: 1) Points; 2) Goal average; 3) Goals scored

=== Matches ===
| 2 Sep 1914 | Aston Villa | 2–1 | Notts County |
| | | Report |
Note: On 4 August 1914, King George V declared war on the advice of his prime minister, H. H. Asquith, leader of the Liberal Party. On 2 September 1914, the new football season kicked-off.

| 5 Sep 1914 | Aston Villa | 1–3 | Sunderland |
| | | Report |

| 12 Sep 1914 | Wednesday | 5–2 | Aston Villa |
| | | Report |

| 19 Sep 1914 | Aston Villa | 2–1 | Albion |
| | | Report |

| 26 Sep 1914 | Everton | 0–0 | Aston Villa |
| | | Report |

| 3 Oct 1914 | Aston Villa | 2–1 | Chelsea |
| | | Report |

| 10 Oct 1914 | Bradford | 3–0 | Aston Villa |
| | | Report |

| 17 Oct 1914 | Aston Villa | 3–3 | Burnley |
| | | Report |

| 24 Oct 1914 | Spurs | 0–2 | Aston Villa |
| | | Report |

| 31 Oct 1914 | Aston Villa | 2–1 | Newcastle |
| | | Report |
Note: In October Villa beat Newcastle. The teams had met 33 times in the league with 13 wins each and 7 draws.

| 7 Nov 1914 | Boro | 1–1 | Aston Villa |
| | | Report |

| 14 Nov 1914 | Aston Villa | 1–0 | Sheffield United |
| | | Report |

| 25 Nov 1914 | Manchester City | 1–0 | Aston Villa |
| | | Report |

| 28 Nov 1914 | Liverpool | 3–6 | Aston Villa |
| | | Report |

| 5 Dec 1914 | Aston Villa | 1–2 | BPA |
| | | Report |

| 12 Dec 1914 | Oldham | 3–3 | Aston Villa |
| | | Report |

| 19 Dec 1914 | Aston Villa | 3–3 | Manchester United |
| | | Report |

| 25 Dec 1914 | Blackburn | 1–2 | Aston Villa |
| | | Report |

| 26 Dec 1914 | Aston Villa | 1–7 | Bolton |
| | | Report |

| 1 Jan 1915 | Bolton | 2–2 | Aston Villa |
| | | Report | | Attendance: 18,000 |

| 2 Jan 1915 | Sunderland | 4–0 | Aston Villa |
| | | Report |

| 16 Jan 1915 | Aston Villa | 0–0 | Wednesday |
| | | Report |

| 23 Jan 1915 | Albion | 2–0 | Aston Villa |
| | | Report |

| 6 Feb 1915 | Chelsea | 3–1 | Aston Villa |
| | | Report |

| 10 Feb 1915 | Aston Villa | 1–5 | Everton |
| | | Report |

| 13 Feb 1915 | Aston Villa | 0–0 | Bradford |
| | | Report |

| 22 Feb 1915 | Burnley | 2–1 | Aston Villa |
| | | Report |

| 27 Feb 1915 | Aston Villa | 3–1 | Spurs |
| | | Report |

| 13 Mar 1915 | Aston Villa | 5–0 | Boro |
| | | Report |

| 20 Mar 1915 | Sheffield United | 3–0 | Aston Villa |
| | | Report |

| 2 Apr 1915 | Aston Villa | 2–1 | Blackburn Rovers |
| | | Report | | Attendance: 15,000 |
Note: Cold and blustery conditions.

| 3 Apr 1915 | Aston Villa | 6–2 | Liverpool |
| | | Report |

| 5 Apr 1915 | Notts County | 1–1 | Aston Villa |
| | | Report |

| 10 Apr 1915 | BPA | 2–2 | Aston Villa |
| | | Report |

| 17 Apr 1915 | Aston Villa | 0–0 | Oldham |
| | | Report |

| 21 Apr 1915 | Aston Villa | 4–1 | Manchester City |
| | | Report |

| 26 Apr 1915 | Manchester United | 1–0 | Aston Villa | Old Trafford |
| | | Report |
Note: By beating Villa, United secured their survival in the top division.

| 28 Apr 1915 | Newcastle | 3–0 | Aston Villa |
| | | Report |
Note: Hardy, Littlewood, Weston, Morris, Harrop, Barber, Wallace, Stephenson, Hampton, Nash, Bache. Newcastle's survival in the top division had been secured following the defeat of Chelsea earlier in the day.

Source: avfchistory.co.uk

== FA Cup ==
=== First round ===
36 of the 40 clubs from the First and Second divisions joined the 12 clubs who came through the qualifying rounds. The other four sides, Lincoln City, Nottingham Forest, Glossop and Leicester Fosse were entered in the sixth qualifying round, with only Leicester going out at that stage after losing to Swansea Town.

Sixteen Southern League sides were given byes to the First Round to bring the total number of teams up to 64. These included |Exeter City

32 matches were scheduled to be played on Saturday, 9 January 1915. Six matches were drawn and went to replays in the following midweek fixture.

| Tie no | Home team | Score | Away team | Date |
|---|---|---|---|---|
| 14 | Aston Villa | 2–0 | Exeter City | 9 January 1915 |

=== Second round ===
The 16 Second Round matches were played on Saturday, 30 January 1915. Three matches were drawn, with the replays taking place in the following weekend fixture. One of these was again drawn, and a second replay was played, again at the following Saturday.

| Tie no | Home team | Score | Away team | Date |
|---|---|---|---|---|
| 8 | Manchester City | 1–0 | Aston Villa | 30 January 1915 |

== Charity Cup ==
In September, Villa lost the Birmingham Charity Cup 2-3 to West Brom.

== Players ==
Frank Moss joined First Division club Villa for a £250 fee in February 1914 and made two appearances during the following season, but he had to wait until after the First World War before he could resume his career. During the war, Moss guested for Bellis and Morcom, Aston Park Rangers, Smethwick Carriage Works and Bradford City. Other debuts included Jimmy Stephenson (31), Howard Humphries (20), George Hampton, and Harry Nash (12).

Harry Hampton, "The Wellington Whirlwind," played as a centre forward for Aston Villa from 1904 to 1920. Richard York had started his career with Handsworth Royal, Birchfield Rangers and the Royal Air Force, In March 1915 he joined Aston Villa as an amateur, signing professional forms in August 1919.
