= 1915–16 Aston Villa F.C. season =

English football club season

Aston Villa
1915-16 season
- Chairman: Frederick Rinder
- Manager: George Ramsay
- First Division: x
- FA Cup: x

The 1915-16 English football season was Aston Villa's 1st season of wartime football in England. During the First World War, between 1915 and 1919, the Football League and FA Cup were suspended and in their place regional league competitions were set up. Appearances in war tournaments did not count in players' official records. Many footballers signed up to fight in the war and as a result many teams were depleted, and fielded guest players instead. The club donated upwards of £30,000 to the War effort including supplying an ambulance in club colours. The 45hp 6-cylinder Napier chassis vehicle frequently drove 600-800 miles a week transporting wounded soldiers around England.

There were four regional leagues. Each league was split into a principal tournament and a subsidiary tournament, except the South-West Combination. The Lancashire and Midland Sections were split into further regional divisions, while the London Combination remained a single league.

Harry Hampton served on the Somme during the First World War and suffered from the effects of mustard gas poisoning. He guested for Stoke in 1918–19, scoring three goals in eight appearances. He also guested for Fulham. Hampton was never the same player after the War and after scoring 242 goals in 376 games for Aston Villa, he would move to local team, Birmingham.

Jack Windmill saw active service in World War I in the Royal Warwickshire Regiment. He rose to the rank of Regimental Sergeant Major and gained the Military Cross and the Distinguished Conduct Medal for bravery.

Jimmy Stephenson enlisted in the Royal Field Artillery and saw action on the Western Front and later served as part of the British Army of the Rhine.

Tommy Jackson served with the Royal Northumberland Fusiliers during World War I Sam Hardy served as an ordinary seaman in the Royal Navy during the First World War. Dicky York guested for Chelsea and Boscombe Town during World War I.

Future players serving the war effort included:

- Len Capewell served with the Royal Engineers in Belgium during World War I.

Future Villa manager Jimmy Hogan had taken a position in Vienna to coach the Austria national football team. However, the outbreak of World War I meant that he was interned as a foreign prisoner of war, but was smuggled to the Hungarian border. He moved to Budapest, where he was allowed out of captivity to coach at MTK Budapest between 1914 and 1918. Hogan laid the foundations for MTK's domination of Hungarian football, as they won ten domestic titles in a row between 1913–14 and 1924–25.

Former Villa players killed in WWI included

- Henry Dobson,
- Billy Gerrish,
- Albert Rogers,
- Dr Leigh Roose,
- J Watkins,
- William Bowker.

== See also ==
- List of Aston Villa F.C. records and statistics
