= Doncaster (disambiguation) =

Doncaster is a large city in South Yorkshire, United Kingdom.

Doncaster may also refer to:

== Places ==
- Doncaster (UK Parliament constituency), a former constituency
- Doncaster, Victoria, a suburb of Melbourne
- Electoral district of Doncaster, a former electoral district in Victoria, Australia
- Doncaster, Quebec, an Indian reserve in Canada
- Doncaster, Maryland (disambiguation), multiple places in the U.S. state of Maryland

== People ==
- Stuart Doncaster (1890–1955), English footballer

== Other ==
- Doncaster (horse), an influential Thoroughbred racehorse

== See also ==
- Metropolitan Borough of Doncaster, a district in South Yorkshire that encompasses the city
- Doncaster Racecourse, a racecourse in the city
- Doncaster railway station, a large station that serves the city of Doncaster
- Doncaster Rovers F.C., a football club who compete in the English league system
