= Tommy Weston =

English footballer

Personal information
- Full name: Thomas Weston
- Date of birth: 2 August 1890
- Place of birth: Halesowen, England
- Date of death: 1952 (aged 62)
- Place of death: Stourbridge, England
- Height: 5 ft 10 in (1.78 m)
- Position: Left back

Senior career*
Years	Team	Apps	(Gls)
1907	Quarry Bank		
1908	Old Hill Comrades		
1909	Coombs Wood		
1910	Stourbridge		
1911–1921	Aston Villa	154	(0)
1922–1923	Stoke	4	(0)
Total		158	(0)
- * Club domestic league appearances and goals

Thomas Weston (2 August 1890 – 1952) was a footballer who played in the Football League for Aston Villa and Stoke.

== Career ==
Weston was born in Halesowen and played for several amateur sides before joining Aston Villa in 1911. He soon established himself as first choice full back and earned a reputation as a tough and uncompromising defender. He helped Villa win the FA Cup in 1912–13. Weston suffered injury in 1914-15. It was thought that he would miss the entirety of the rest of the season but he returned as full-back along with Littlewood for Good Friday 1915 when Aston Villa beat Blackburn 2–1.

Weston helped Villa win the 1919–20. He made 178 appearances for the "Villans" in the seven seasons he spent at Villa Park, helping them finish runners-up in the First Division twice in 1912–13 and 1913–14. He left in the summer of 1922 and joined newly promoted Stoke where he only managed to play four matches in 1922–23 before deciding to retire.

== Career statistics ==
Appearances and goals by club, season and competition
Club	Season	League			FA Cup		Total	
Club	Season	Division	Apps	Goals	Apps	Goals	Apps	Goals
Aston Villa	1911–12	First Division	15	0	2	0	17	0
Aston Villa	1912–13	First Division	30	0	6	0	36	0
Aston Villa	1913–14	First Division	28	0	5	0	33	0
Aston Villa	1914–15	First Division	12	0	0	0	12	0
Aston Villa	1919–20	First Division	30	0	5	0	35	0
Aston Villa	1920–21	First Division	28	0	1	0	29	0
Aston Villa	1921–22	First Division	11	0	6	0	17	0
Aston Villa	Total		154	0	25	0	179	0
Stoke	1922–23	First Division	4	0	0	0	4	0
Career total			158	0	25	0	183	0

== Honours ==
Aston Villa

- FA Cup: 1912–13, 1919–20
