= Andy Ducat =

English cricketer

Personal information
- Full name: Andrew Ducat
- Born: 15 February 1886; Brixton, Surrey, England
- Died: 23 July 1942 (aged 56); Lord's Cricket Ground, St John's Wood, London, England
- Nickname: Mac
- Height: 5 ft 10 in (1.78 m)
- Batting: Right-handed
- Bowling: Right-arm slow

International information
- National side: England
- Only Test: 2 July 1921 v Australia

Career statistics
Competition	Test	First-class
Matches	1	429
Runs scored	5	23,373
Batting average	2.50	38.31
100s/50s	0/0	52/109
Top score	3	306*
Balls bowled	–	1,981
Wickets	–	21
Bowling average	–	43.00
5 wickets in innings	–	0
10 wickets in match	–	0
Best bowling	–	3/12
Catches/stumpings	1/–	206/–
- Source: Cricinfo, 17 December 2018

Andrew Ducat (15 February 1886 – 23 July 1942) was an English cricketer and footballer. He played internationally for both the England cricket team and England football team, one of a small group of players to have represented their country in both sports. Domestically he played for Surrey County Cricket Club and for Woolwich Arsenal, Aston Villa, and Fulham football clubs. He died while batting at Lord's.

== Early life ==
Ducat was born in Brixton, at that point still part of Surrey, but grew up in Southend in Essex. The cricket writer David Foot said his surname was "pronounced 'Dewkitt' by the family, 'Duckett' on the football terraces". In the First World War, he served in the Royal Garrison Artillery, from 1915, and was promoted to Company Quartermaster Sergeant in 1916 until being discharged due to 'disability' in 1919.

== Cricket career ==
Ducat joined the ground staff at The Oval in 1906, and soon became a regular member of the Surrey county team, playing alongside Tom Hayward, Jack Hobbs and Ernest Hayes. Standing 5'10" high, he was a powerful, forcing batsman, and made 52 centuries for Surrey, including 306 not out in 280 minutes against the Oxford University in 1919. He was also one of the Wisden Cricketers of the Year in 1920. He missed many matches due to injury: a broken leg in 1912 almost ended his career, and he missed the 1924 season after breaking his arm in the nets. In 1928, he made 994 runs in less than six weeks, including centuries in four successive matches. In 1921 it was said that he was one of the most dangerous batsmen in England that is not quite first class, but his defence was not sound enough to bring him consistent success against the best bowlers.

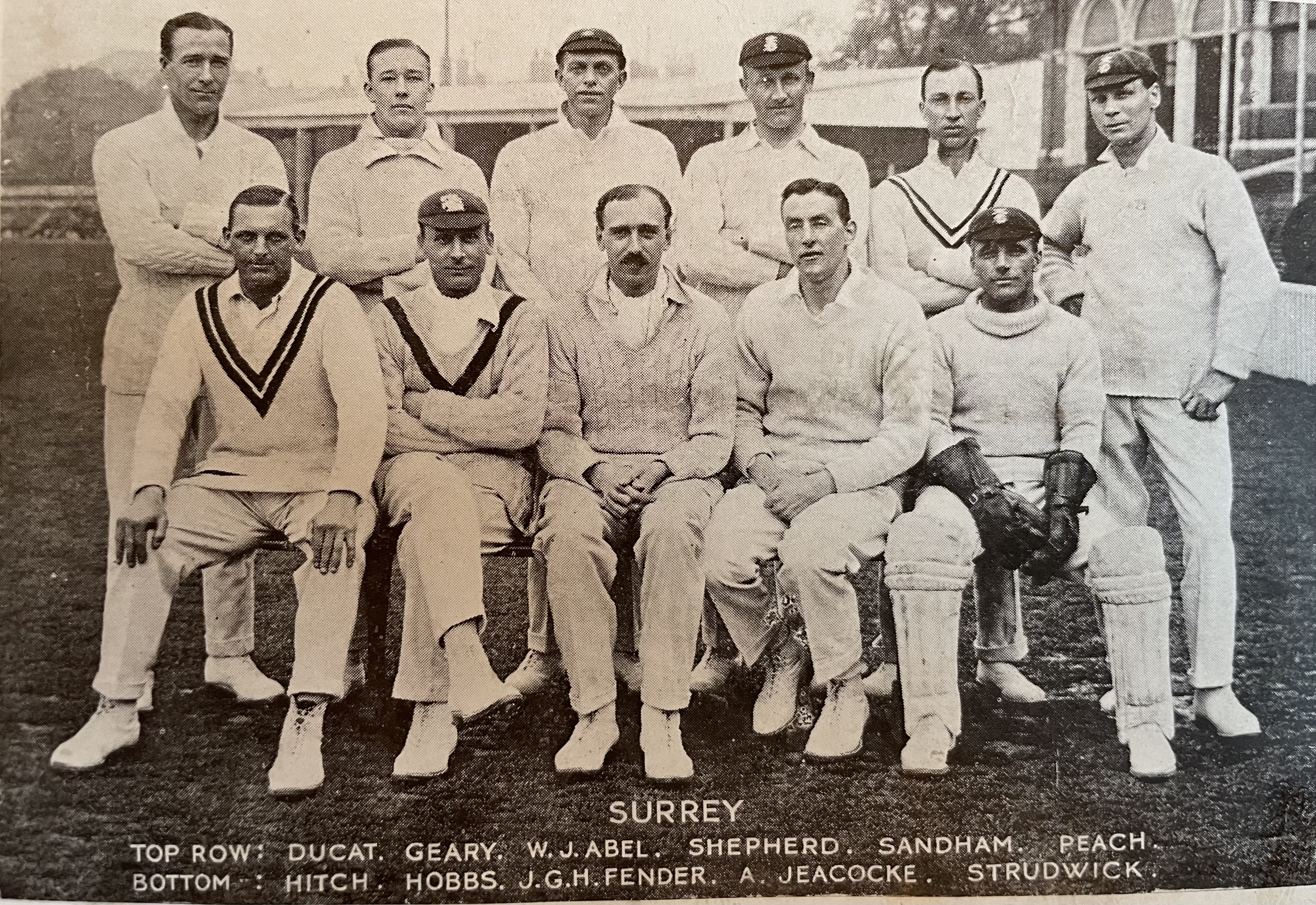
Surrey Cricket Team c1922

He played in only one Test, the 3rd Test against Australia at Headingley in 1921 when he was unlucky to only make 3 and 2. He was "doubly" out in the first innings: his bat disintegrated when he played a ball bowled by Ted McDonald, the ball looping to slip where it was caught, and part of the bat dislodging a bail. He was given out caught rather than hit wicket.

== Football career ==
Andy Ducat
Personal information
- Positions: Centre forward; right half

Senior career*
Years	Team	Apps	(Gls)
1903–1905	Southend Athletic		
1905–1912	Woolwich Arsenal	175	(19)
1912–1921	Aston Villa	74	(4)
1921–1924	Fulham	64	(0)

International career
1910–1920	England	6	(1)

Managerial career
- 1924–1926: Fulham
- * Club domestic league appearances and goals

Ducat also had a successful football career. He started out playing for non-league Southend Athletic before joining First Division Woolwich Arsenal in 1905.

He made his Arsenal debut on 11 February 1905, in a 2–0 win against Blackburn Rovers, playing at centre forward. After losing his place in 1906–07, he was later switched to right half and became a regular in 1907–08 and 1908–09. During his time at Arsenal, he won three caps for England, with his debut coming against Ireland in Belfast on 12 February 1910; England won 6–1. On his second appearance for England, against Wales on 14 March the same year, Ducat scored the only goal in a 1–0 win. Having played 188 matches and scored 21 goals for Arsenal, who were at the time going through a financial crisis, Ducat's ability and success with England brought attention from bigger clubs.

Andy Ducat became Aston Villa's record signing in 1912 when England's most successful club paid £1,000 for the international. After suffering a broken leg in his first season at Villa, he recovered to become a stalwart in the side, captaining Villa to their sixth FA Cup win in 1919–20, beating Huddersfield Town. He also regained his England place; having not played since 1910, he won three more caps during 1920, the last coming in a 2–0 win against Ireland at Roker Park on 23 October 1920, bringing his total number of England appearances to six.

He moved to Fulham in 1921, and upon his retirement from playing in 1924, he succeeded Phil Kelso (his former boss at Arsenal) as Fulham manager. However, the Cottagers struggled with Ducat in charge, finishing 12th and 19th in the Second Division during the two seasons he was at the helm. He was sacked in 1926. After his departure from Fulham, he was given permission by the FA to play football for the Casuals.

== Personal life ==
Ducat married on 20 June 1914 at St Stephen's Church, Hounslow, Vera Barbour, daughter of Aston Villa footballer Horace Barbour. They had one daughter together.

== Retirement and death ==
After retiring from cricket in 1931, Ducat became a cricket coach at Eton College until his death. He was also a sports reporter for the Daily Sketch. He died suddenly in 1942 during a game at Lord's Cricket Ground of an apparent heart attack after lunch whilst playing in a wartime cricket match between teams from his unit of the Home Guard from Surrey against another from Sussex. Ducat arrived late to the match having been involved in a car accident on the way, and, having scored 29, was facing the bowler when he collapsed. The match was immediately abandoned as a mark of respect for Ducat. He was aged 56, and he is the only person to have died while playing in a match at Lord's. He was cremated at Golders Green Crematorium.

== Honours ==
Aston Villa

- FA Cup: 1919–20

== See also ==
- List of fatalities while playing cricket
