= 1913 FA Cup final =

1913 FA Cup Final
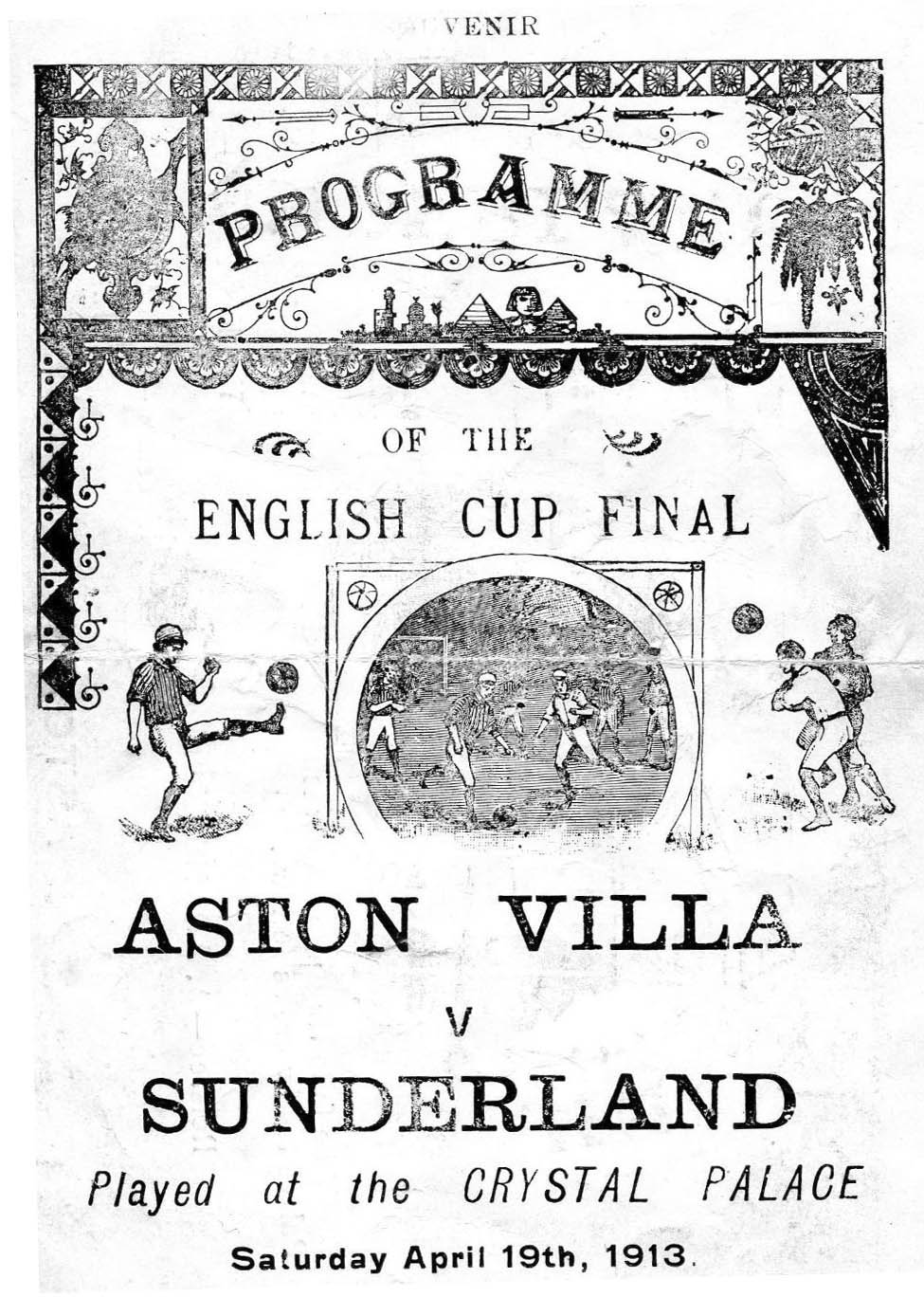
- Programme cover
- Event: 1912–13 FA Cup
Aston Villa	Sunderland
1	0
- Date: 19 April 1913
- Venue: Crystal Palace, London
- Referee: A. Adams
- Attendance: 121,919

The 1913 FA Cup final was contested by Aston Villa and Sunderland on 19 April 1913 at London's Crystal Palace. Aston Villa won 1–0 with a goal by Tommy Barber from a cross by Charlie Wallace. Wallace had earlier missed a penalty, something that would not occur again in an FA Cup final until the 1988 final between Wimbledon and Liverpool.

It was Sunderland's first appearance in the FA Cup Final and the first time the Football League's top two finishers had vied for the trophy, even though the League would not be decided for another week. On their way to the match Sunderland had to replay their quarter-final twice and then their semi-final once after draws in those contests. Aston Villa were appearing in the final after an eight-year absence and their victory was their fifth, equalling the record at that time of the Wanderers and Blackburn Rovers.

During the match Sunderland's Charlie Thomson and Villa's Harry Hampton almost immediately resumed a long-running feud that led to both players being suspended for a month at the start of the following season. The contest was noted for its rough play and led to the withdrawal of Sunderland's invitation to take part in the 1913 Charity Shield match. The referee, Mr. A. Adams, from Nottingham was also suspended, to the dismay of the Referees' Union, having allowed 17 minutes for stoppage time.

== Background ==
Prior to the match, suffragettes of the Women's Social and Political Union plotted to bomb the grandstand of Crystal Palace, however their plans were foiled before they could execute their terrorist attack.

== Route to the final ==
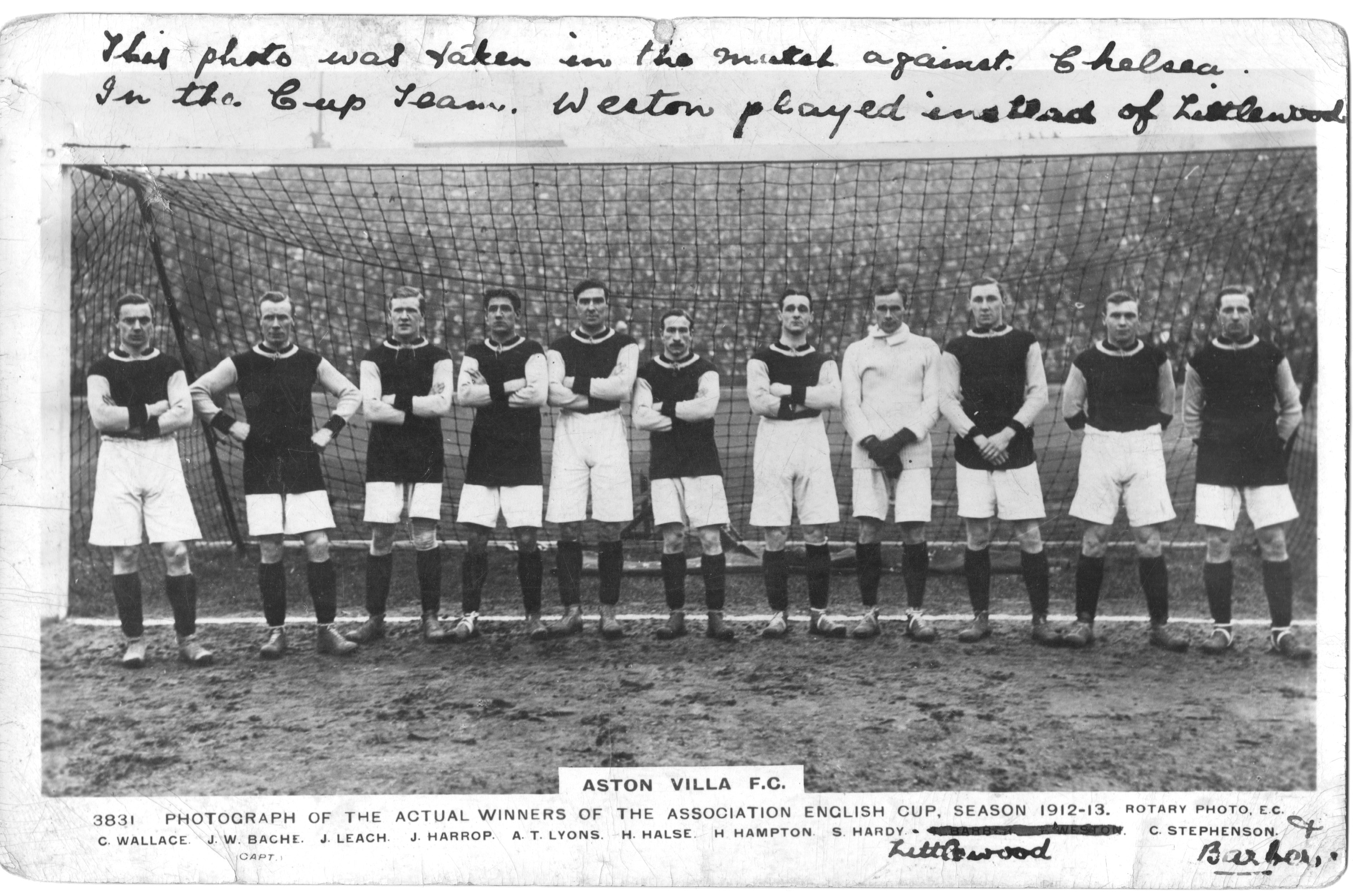
1913 Aston Villa team after pre-cup game with Chelsea. The three players far right are Littlewood (who did not appear in the cup final), Stephenson, and Barber. Tommy Weston, who did appear in the cup rounds, is not shown

Aston Villa
Round 1	Derby County	1–3	Aston Villa
Round 2	Aston Villa	5–0	West Ham United
Round 3	Aston Villa	5–0	Crystal Palace
Quarter-final	Bradford Park Avenue	0–5	Aston Villa
Semi-final	Aston Villa	1–0	Oldham Athletic
	(at Ewood Park)		

Sunderland
Round 1	Sunderland	6–0	Clapton Orient
Round 2	Sunderland	2–0	Manchester City
Round 3	Sunderland	4–2	Swindon Town
Quarter-final	Sunderland	0–0	Newcastle United
Quarter-final replay	Newcastle United	2–2	Sunderland
Quarter-final 2nd replay	Newcastle United	0–3	Sunderland
Semi-final	Sunderland	0–0	Burnley
	(at Bramall Lane)		
Semi-final replay	Sunderland	3–2	Burnley
	(at St Andrew's)		

== Match details ==
19 April 1913
15:00 BST

Aston Villa	1–0	Sunderland
Wallace (penalty missed); Barber 78'	Report

Crystal Palace, London
Attendance: 121,919
Referee: Mr. A. Adams (Nottingham)

Aston Villa	Sunderland

GK	(England) Sam Hardy
DF	(England) Tom Lyons
DF	(England) Tommy Weston
MF	(England) Tommy Barber
MF	(England) Jimmy Harrop
MF	(England) Jimmy Leach
FW	(England) Charlie Wallace
FW	(England) Clem Stephenson
FW	(England) Harry Hampton
FW	(England) Harold Halse
FW	(England) Joe Bache (c)
Secretary-Manager:
(Scotland) George Ramsay

GK	(England) Joe Butler
DF	(England) Charlie Gladwin
DF	(England) Harry Ness
MF	(England) Francis Cuggy
MF	(Scotland) Charlie Thomson (c)
MF	(Scotland) Harry Low
FW	(England) Jackie Mordue
FW	(England) Charlie Buchan
FW	(Scotland) James Richardson
FW	(England) George Holley
FW	(England) Henry Martin
Manager:
(Northern Ireland) Bob Kyle

Match rules

- 90 minutes.
- 30 minutes of extra-time if necessary.
- Replay if scores still level.
