= Stan Hardy =

English footballer

Personal information
- Full name: Stanley Hardy
- Date of birth: 1890
- Place of birth: Newcastle upon Tyne, England
- Position: Inside left

Youth career
- Rutherford College

Senior career*
Years	Team	Apps	(Gls)
1913–1914	Newcastle United	3	(1)

Managerial career
- 1930–1931: Nottingham Forest
- * Club domestic league appearances and goals

Stanley Hardy was an English professional footballer who played in the Football League for Newcastle United as an inside left. He later managed Nottingham Forest.

== Personal life ==
At the time he enlisted in the British Army during the First World War, Hardy was living in Jesmond. He served in the Royal Northumberland Fusiliers and the Machine Gun Corps during the war and achieved the rank of lieutenant. Hardy was discharged after being gassed on the Western Front. He was related to footballer Sam Hardy.

== Career statistics ==
=== Player ===
Appearances and goals by club, season and competition
Club	Season	League			FA Cup		Total	
Club	Season	Division	Apps	Goals	Apps	Goals	Apps	Goals
Newcastle United	1913–14	First Division	3	1	0	0	3	1
Career total			3	1	0	0	3	1

=== Manager ===
Managerial record by team and tenure
Team	From	To	Record					Ref
Team	From	To	P	W	D	L	Win %	Ref
Nottingham Forest	August 1930	May 1931	43	14	9	20	32.6	
Total			43	14	9	20	32.6	―
