= Francis Cuggy =

English footballer (1889–1965)

Personal information
- Date of birth: 16 June 1889
- Place of birth: Walker, Northumberland, England
- Date of death: 27 March 1965 (aged 75)
- Place of death: Walker, Northumberland, England
- Position: Right-half

Youth career
- Willington Athletic

Senior career*
Years	Team	Apps	(Gls)
1909–1921	Sunderland	166	(4)
1921–1923	Wallsend		

International career
1913–1914	England	2	(0)

Managerial career
- 1921–1923: Wallsend
- 1923–1926: Celta Vigo
- * Club domestic league appearances and goals

Francis Cuggy (16 June 1889 – 27 March 1965) was an English football player and coach. A right-half, he won the Football League championship with Sunderland in 1912–13 and made two appearances for England. He later coached Spanish club Celta Vigo.

== Playing career ==
=== Sunderland ===
Cuggy was born in Walker, Northumberland and played youth football with Willington Athletic, where he was spotted by scouts from Sunderland. He joined the Roker Park club in March 1909 making his debut in a 3–2 defeat at Aston Villa on 12 February 1913. Sunderland narrowly missed out on the Double, losing the FA Cup final 1–0 to Aston Villa, who themselves were runners-up in the League.

Both his appearances for England came against Ireland. The first was on 15 February 1913 at Windsor Park, Belfast and Cuggie was teamed up with his Sunderland colleagues Charlie Buchan and Jackie Mordue. Although Buchan scored early in the game, England went down 2–1. The second international appearance was also against Ireland a year later on 14 February 1914, when he was joined by his Sunderland colleague Henry Martin who was making his solitary England appearance. The match was played at Ayresome Park, Middlesbrough and England were defeated 3–0. This was the first time that England had been beaten by Ireland on home soil. Thus Cuggy's England career ended with two defeats from two appearances.

The outbreak of the First World War then interrupted his football career. After the war he returned to the side for the 1919–20 season, but he left the club in May 1921 to become player-manager of Wallsend. In his twelve years at Roker Park, he made a total of 190 appearances in all competitions, with four goals.

== Coaching career ==
Cuggy spent two years with Wallsend before, in November 1923, he accepted a five-year contract to coach Spanish club Celta Vigo.

== Later life ==
When his involvement in football came to an end he worked in the shipyards on Wearside.

In 2002, the shirt that he wore in the 1913 FA Cup Final was auctioned at Christie's in London. The shirt sold for £5,875, far exceeding the estimate of £1,000–1,500.

== Honours ==
Sunderland

- The Football League: 1912–13
- FA Cup finalist: 1913

Celta Vigo

- Galician Championship: 1923
