= George Holley =

English footballer (1885–1942)

Personal information
- Date of birth: 20 November 1885
- Place of birth: Seaham, County Durham, England
- Date of death: 27 August 1942 (aged 56)
- Place of death: Wolverhampton, England
- Position: Inside forward

Youth career
- Seaham Athletic
- Seaham Villa
- Seaham White Star

Senior career*
| Years | Team | Apps | (Gls) |
| 1904–1919 | Sunderland | 281 | (146) |
| 1919–1920 | Brighton & Hove Albion | 12 | (5) |
| Total | | 293 | (151) |

International career
| 1909–1913 | England | 10 | (8) |
- * Club domestic league appearances and goals

George Holley (20 November 1885 – 27 August 1942) was an English professional footballer who spent most of his career as an inside forward with Sunderland, helping them claim the Football League title in 1913. He was also joint top scorer in the First Division in 1911–12 and represented England ten times, scoring eight goals.

== Career ==
=== Sunderland ===
Holley was born in Seaham, County Durham and played local football for three different Seaham clubs: Seaham Athletic, Seaham Villa and Wearside League champions Seaham White Star before joining Sunderland in November 1904. Initially, Holley played in the reserves where he was a regular goal-scorer, although he made a scoring debut in the First Division on 27 December 1904 away to Sheffield Wednesday. Following the transfer of Alf Common to Middlesbrough in February 1905, Holley became a first team regular.

In his first few seasons at Roker Park he was overshadowed as a goal-scorer by Arthur Bridgett, but in 1907–08 he was the club's top-scorer with 24 league goals. On 5 December 1908, Holley scored a hat-trick in a 9–1 victory at St James' Park over bitter local rivals Newcastle United, with the other goals coming from Billy Hogg (another hat-trick), Bridgett (two) and Jackie Mordue. Sunderland finished the 1908–09 season in third place, with Newcastle champions.

In January 1908 Sunderland had signed Leigh Roose, who was brought in to replace Ned Doig who had moved to Liverpool. Holley and Roose soon became close friends.

Holley won his first international cap against Wales on 15 March 1909, playing on the right alongside his Sunderland teammate, Arthur Bridgett. His close friend, Leigh Roose, was in goal for Wales but could not stop Holley scoring after 15 minutes as England ran out 2–0 victors. Holley was also selected for the 1909 summer tour of Europe, playing in all three matches, scoring twice in both the 8–2 victory over Hungary and the 8–1 victory over Austria. Holley scored five goals in five internationals that season. Surprisingly, he was dropped from the team after failing to score in the first game (against Wales) the following season.

Holley continued to score plenty of goals for Sunderland and ended up as the First Division joint top scorer in the 1911–12 season with 25 goals. During this season he scored four goals in a 5–0 defeat of Manchester United at Roker Park on 27 January 1912, as well as a hat-trick against Everton. He also won back his place in the England team and scored in all three games he played in the 1912 British Home Championship.

Sunderland won the Football League First Division championship in the 1912–13 season. Holley's 12 goals made an important contribution although top-scorer was Charlie Buchan with 27 goals. Buchan later argued that in a game against Bradford City on 2 November 1912, Holley's performance was the best he ever saw by an inside-forward. "He scored a magnificent hat-trick, running nearly half the length of the field each time and coolly dribbling the ball round goalkeeper Jock Ewart before placing it in the net."

Sunderland narrowly missed out on the Double, losing the FA Cup final 1–0 to Aston Villa. Holley was not fully fit for the cup final and went into the game with his ankle and knee bandaged.

After the First World War, Holley left Sunderland to play for Brighton & Hove Albion in July 1919. He was Sunderland's top scorer in five separate seasons and during his time at the club he scored 154 goals in 315 appearances in all competitions. Altogether he scored nine hat-tricks for Sunderland and his scoring record for Sunderland is bettered only by Bobby Gurney, Charlie Buchan and Dave Halliday.

=== Later career ===
He retired from playing in 1920 and returned to Sunderland in January 1921 for an 18-month spell as coach. He later had spells coaching at Wolverhampton Wanderers for ten years and then at Barnsley.

His son, Tom played as a central defender for Barnsley from 1932 to 1936, and then for Leeds United from 1936 to 1948.

He died in Wolverhampton on 27 August 1942.

== Honours ==
Sunderland

- First Division: 1912–13
- FA Cup runner-up: 1912–13

England

- British Home Championship: 1908–09, 1911–12

Individual

- First Division top scorer: 1911–12
