= Doncaster, Maryland =

Doncaster, Maryland may refer to:

- Doncaster, Charles County, Maryland, an unincorporated community
- Doncaster, Talbot County, Maryland, an unincorporated community
- Doncaster Town Site, a historic village
