= 1908–09 in English football =

Football in England
- Season: 1908–09

The 1908–09 season was the 38th season of competitive football in England.

== Overview ==
Tottenham Hotspur played their first ever season in the Football League, gaining promotion to the First Division in the process. Spurs, along with Bradford Park Avenue entered the Second Division to replace Lincoln City and Stoke.

This year started a new competition: the Charity Shield; a match between the champion of the Professional League vs. the champion of the Amateur League. The first championship went to Manchester United, in a replayed final against Queens Park Rangers.

== Events ==
- 5 December 1908– Sunderland defeat Newcastle United 9-1, after the game was tied 1-1 at half-time. This is the joint biggest away victory in the top division in Football League history. The win was even more remarkable as Newcastle were league champions that season winning the title by 7 points from Everton, conceding only 41 goals all season.

== Honours ==
Competition	Winner
First Division	Newcastle United (3)
Second Division	Bolton Wanderers
FA Cup	Manchester United (1)
Charity Shield	Manchester United
Home Championship	England

Notes = Number in parentheses is the times that club has won that honour. * indicates new record for competition

== League tables ==
=== First Division ===
Pos	Team	Pld	W	D	L	GF	GA	GAv	Pts	Relegation
1	Newcastle United (C)	38	24	5	9	65	41	1.585	53	
2	Everton	38	18	10	10	82	57	1.439	46	
3	Sunderland	38	21	2	15	78	63	1.238	44	
4	Blackburn Rovers	38	14	13	11	61	50	1.220	41	
5	The Wednesday	38	17	6	15	67	61	1.098	40	
6	Woolwich Arsenal	38	14	10	14	52	49	1.061	38	
7	Aston Villa	38	14	10	14	58	56	1.036	38	
8	Bristol City	38	13	12	13	45	58	0.776	38	
9	Middlesbrough	38	14	9	15	59	53	1.113	37	
10	Preston North End	38	13	11	14	48	44	1.091	37	
11	Chelsea	38	14	9	15	56	61	0.918	37	
12	Sheffield United	38	14	9	15	51	59	0.864	37	
13	Manchester United	38	15	7	16	58	68	0.853	37	
14	Nottingham Forest	38	14	8	16	66	57	1.158	36	
15	Notts County	38	14	8	16	51	48	1.063	36	
16	Liverpool	38	15	6	17	57	65	0.877	36	
17	Bury	38	14	8	16	63	77	0.818	36	
18	Bradford City	38	12	10	16	47	47	1.000	34	
19	Manchester City (R)	38	15	4	19	67	69	0.971	34	Relegation to the Second Division
20	Leicester Fosse (R)	38	8	9	21	54	102	0.529	25	Relegation to the Second Division

Source: World Football
Rules for classification: 1) Points; 2) Goal average; 3) Goals scored
(C) Champions; (R) Relegated

=== Second Division ===
Pos	Team	Pld	W	D	L	GF	GA	GAv	Pts	Promotion or relegation
1	Bolton Wanderers (C, P)	38	24	4	10	59	28	2.107	52	Promotion to the First Division
2	Tottenham Hotspur (P)	38	20	11	7	67	32	2.094	51	Promotion to the First Division
3	West Bromwich Albion	38	19	13	6	56	27	2.074	51	
4	Hull City	38	19	6	13	63	39	1.615	44	
5	Derby County	38	16	11	11	55	41	1.341	43	
6	Oldham Athletic	38	17	6	15	55	43	1.279	40	
7	Wolverhampton Wanderers	38	14	11	13	56	48	1.167	39	
8	Glossop	38	15	8	15	57	53	1.075	38	
9	Gainsborough Trinity	38	15	8	15	49	70	0.700	38	
10	Fulham	38	13	11	14	58	48	1.208	37	
11	Birmingham	38	14	9	15	58	61	0.951	37	
12	Leeds City	38	14	7	17	43	53	0.811	35	
13	Grimsby Town	38	14	7	17	41	54	0.759	35	
14	Burnley	38	13	7	18	51	58	0.879	33	
15	Clapton Orient	38	12	9	17	37	49	0.755	33	
16	Bradford (Park Avenue)	38	13	6	19	51	59	0.864	32	
17	Barnsley	38	11	10	17	48	57	0.842	32	
18	Stockport County	38	14	3	21	39	71	0.549	31	
19	Chesterfield Town (R)	38	11	8	19	37	67	0.552	30	Failed re-election and demoted
20	Blackpool	38	9	11	18	46	68	0.676	29	Re-elected

(C) Champions; (P) Promoted; (R) Relegated

== National team ==
The England national football team had a very successful season, with victory in the 1909 British Home Championship due to a whitewash of the other Home Nations and three heavy victories during a tour of Central Europe for the second year running.

=== Results ===
13 February 1909

England	4–0	Ireland
Vivian Woodward ×2, George Hilsdon ×2 (1P)

Park Avenue, Bradford

15 March 1909

England	2–0	Wales
George Holley, Bert Freeman

City Ground, Nottingham

3 April 1909

England	2–0	Scotland
George Wall ×2

The Crystal Palace, London

=== European tour ===
==== Players ====
The players chosen for the tour were:

Name	Position	Club	Appearances	Goals
Arthur Bridgett	LW	Sunderland	3	1
Bob Crompton	RB	Blackburn Rovers	3	0
Harold Fleming	FW	Swindon Town	2	3
Harold Halse	FW	Manchester United	1	2
Sam Hardy	GK	Liverpool	3	0
George Holley	FW	Sunderland	3	4
Evelyn Lintott	LH	Bradford City	2	0
Jesse Pennington	LB	West Bromwich Albion	3	0
Fred Pentland	RW	Middlesbrough	3	0
George Richards	LH	Derby County	1	0
Ben Warren	RH	Chelsea	3	1
Billy Wedlock	CH	Bristol City	3	0
Vivian Woodward	CF	Tottenham Hotspur	3	9

===== Key =====
- GK — Goalkeeper
- RB — Right back
- LB — Left back
- CB — Centre back
- CH — Centre half
- LH — Left half
- RH — Right half
- RW — Right winger
- LW — Left winger
- FW — Forward
- CF — Centre forward

==== Match details ====
29 May 1909

Hungary	2–4	England
Ákos Késmárky, József Grósz	(Summary)	Vivian Woodward ×2, Harold Fleming, Arthur Bridgett

Millenáris Sporttelep, Budapest
Attendance: 10,000
Referee: Christiaan J Groothoff (Holland)

31 May 1909

Hungary	2–8	England
Imre Schlosser, Árpád Mészáros	(Summary)	Vivian Woodward ×4, Harold Fleming ×2, George Holley ×2

Millenáris Sporttelep, Budapest
Attendance: 11,000
Referee: Hugo Meisl (Austria)

1 June 1909

Austria	1–8	England
Leopold Neubauer	(Summary)	Vivian Woodward ×3, George Holley ×2, Harold Halse ×2, Ben Warren

Hohe Warte Stadium, Vienna
Attendance: 3,000
Referee: Ferenc M Schubert (Hungary)
