= Harry Ness =

English footballer

Personal information
- Full name: Harry Marshall Ness
- Date of birth: 8 June 1885
- Place of birth: Scarborough, Yorkshire, England
- Date of death: 26 June 1957 (age 72)
- Place of death: Scarborough, Yorkshire, England
- Position: Full back

Senior career*
Years	Team	Apps	(Gls)
- Barnsley
1911–1920	Sunderland	101	(0)
1920–1921	Aberdeen		
- * Club domestic league appearances and goals

Harry Marshall Ness (8 June 1885 – 26 June 1957) was an English footballer who played for Barnsley and Sunderland. He was a full back.

== Club career ==
Harry Ness was part of the Barnsley side that contested the 1910 FA Cup Final. They lost in a replay 2–0 to Newcastle United. He transferred to Sunderland in 1911.

He was a FA Cup runner up again in 1913 FA Cup Final when Sunderland were beaten 1–0 by Aston Villa but he did get a league winners' medal as Sunderland topped the table.

In 1916, Ness enlisted with 42nd Battalion of the Royal Highlanders (Black Watch) and first went to Perth to train.

In May 1920, he was transferred to Aberdeen. He suffered an injury in a pre-season match but was reported to have made a complete recovery by October 1920, and played for their reserve team. Some incident occurred, as in May 1921, he filed a claim against Aberdeen with the SFA for £132 (equivalent to £6,000 in 2025). The next month, it was reported that Aberdeen came to a settlement with Ness. In August of that year, it was reported that Aberdeen would transfer Ness.

== Post-career ==
He married Laura Hurd in 1924. He later worked as a publican in Scarborough, where he died in 1957.
