= Charles Buchan's Football Monthly =

British football magazine

- July 1954 issue
- Owner: Charles Buchan Publications Ltd
- Publisher: Charles Buchan Publications Ltd
- Editor: Charles Buchan (1951-1960)
- Founded: (1) September 1950 (2) 1974
- Ceased publication: (1) 1974 (2) 1995

Charles Buchan’s Football Monthly, later known as just Football Monthly, was a British football magazine published from 1951 to 1974, with a follow-up title running from 1974 to 1995.

== History ==
Founded by footballer-turned-broadcaster Charlie Buchan and published independently, it was the first publication devoted solely to football since the closure of the Athletic News in 1931, and was also the first magazine aimed at men to feature pages in full colour, a strategy already in place for women’s periodicals. At the time eighty sports magazines were on sale in the United Kingdom due to the surge in interest in sport in the aftermath of the 1948 Olympic Games, with football taking up a proportion of the copy, but without much in-depth reportage. Buchan's publication had a full colour cover and was printed on better quality paper than other magazines.

The publication launched in September 1950 citing "Our object is to provide a publication that will be worthy of our National game and the grand sportsmen who play and watch it". Buchan's publication had a full colour cover and was printed on better quality paper than other magazines. Despite the existence of many major publishing houses, Buchan launched independently as Charles Buchan's Publications Ltd based at 408 The Strand, London WC2. This helped it to an immediate circulation of 60,000 copies a month.

Alongside Buchan, early correspondents for the magazine included Brian Glanville, Leslie Yates, Norman Ackland, and Daily Mirror recruits John Thompson and Joe Sarl, joined in the 1960s by Ray Sonin and Lesley Vernon.

Among those to contribute on the letters page as younger readers were future broadcasters John Motson, Jim Rosenthal and Nick Owen, writer Sebastian Faulks, poet John Hegley and future football manager Barry Fry.

Buchan’s name remained in the magazine title well beyond his death in 1960, with the publication hitting monthly sales figures of 254,000 by 1969.

However, the launch of weekly titles Goal and Shoot! saw circulation fall, and the magazine was retitled Football Monthly in 1971, repositioning itself away from a younger audience with longer-form journalism.

The magazine subsequently resized in “digest” form with smaller pages, and was renamed as Football Monthly Digest in 1973, running for one more year before being shuttered. The magazine was relaunched by IPC as Football (retitled Football Monthly once more in the 1980s) before finally closing in 1995.

A compendium of past articles titled The Best of Charles Buchan’s Football Monthly was published in 2006, compiled by Simon Inglis.
