= Tommy Barber =

English footballer

Personal information
- Full name: Thomas Barber
- Date of birth: 20 February 1888
- Place of birth: West Stanley, England
- Date of death: 18 September 1925 (aged 37)
- Place of death: Nuneaton, England
- Height: 5 ft 8 in (1.73 m)
- Positions: Half back; inside left

Senior career*
Years	Team	Apps	(Gls)
1905–1906	Shankhouse		
1906–1907	West Stanley		
1907–1908	Hamsterley		
1908–1912	Bolton Wanderers	102	(14)
1912–1919	Aston Villa	57	(9)
1917	→ Brentford (guest)	2	(0)
1918	→ Celtic (guest)	4	(0)
1918	→ Partick Thistle (guest)	1	(1)
1919	→ Linfield (guest)		
1919	→ Belfast Celtic (guest)		
1919	→ Distillery (guest)		
1919	Stalybridge Celtic		
1919–1920	Crystal Palace	20	(7)
1920	Merthyr Town	2	(0)
1920	Ton Pentre		
1920	Pontypridd		
1921–1922	Walsall	5	(2)
1922–1923	Darlaston		
1923–1924	Hinckley United		
1924–1925	Barwell United		
- * Club domestic league appearances and goals

Thomas Barber (20 February 1888 – 18 September 1925) was an English professional footballer who played in the Football League for Aston Villa, Bolton Wanderers, Merthyr Town and Walsall as a half back or inside left.

Barber attended Todd's Nook School. He served as a private in the Football Battalion of the Middlesex Regiment during the First World War and saw action at Delville Wood and Waterlot Farm in the summer of 1916, before suffering gunshot wounds to the legs at Guillemont. Barber was evacuated to Britain and after recovering in Aberdeen, he spent another period in hospital suffering from pleurisy. He was later transferred to the Labour Corps and also worked in a munitions factory in Glasgow. Barber died of tuberculosis in 1925.

== Aston Villa ==
Tommy Barber made his Villa debut on 28 December 1912, ia a 1-1 draw against Bradford at Valley Parade. He scored Villa's first goal of the 1913-14 season in a 1–1 draw against Manchester City at Villa Park.

He scored the winning goal for Aston Villa in the 1913 FA Cup Final.

== Statistics ==
Appearances and goals by club, season and competition
Club	Season	League			National Cup		Total	
Club	Season	Division	Apps	Goals	Apps	Goals	Apps	Goals
Bolton Wanderers	1908–09	Second Division	20	2	0	0	20	2
Bolton Wanderers	1909–10	First Division	15	1	1	0	16	1
Bolton Wanderers	1910–11	Second Division	17	5	1	0	18	5
Bolton Wanderers	1911–12	First Division	38	4	3	0	41	4
Bolton Wanderers	1912–13	First Division	12	2	—		12	2
Bolton Wanderers	Total		102	14	5	0	107	14
Aston Villa	1912–13	First Division	15	2	5	1	20	3
Aston Villa	1913–14	First Division	28	4	5	0	33	4
Aston Villa	1914–15	First Division	14	3	1	0	15	3
Aston Villa	Total		57	9	11	1	68	10
Celtic (guest)	1918–19	Scottish League First Division	4	0	—		4	0
Partick Thistle (guest)	1918–19	Scottish League First Division	1	1	—		1	1
Crystal Palace	1919–20	Southern League First Division	20	7	0	0	20	7
Merthyr Town	1920–21	Third Division South	2	0	0	0	2	0
Walsall	1921–22	Third Division South	5	2	1	0	6	2
Career total			191	33	17	1	208	34

== Honours ==
Bolton Wanderers

- Football League Second Division: 1908–09
- Football League Second Division second-place promotion: 1910–11

Aston Villa

- FA Cup: 1912–13
