= Joe Butler (footballer, born 1879) =

English footballer (1879–1941)

Personal information
- Full name: Joseph Henry Butler
- Date of birth: 1879
- Place of birth: Dawley Bank, England
- Date of death: August 1941 (aged 61–62)
- Position: Goalkeeper

Senior career*
Years	Team	Apps	(Gls)
1897–1898	Dawley Town		
1898–1899	Bamfurlong Rovers		
1899–1905	Stockport County	133	(1)
1905–1906	Clapton Orient	20	(0)
1906–1908	Stockport County	74	(0)
1908–1912	Glossop	161	(0)
1912–1914	Sunderland	65	(0)
1914–1915	Lincoln City	37	(0)
1916–1919	Stockport County	37	(0)
1919–1920	Macclesfield	23	(0)
c. 1922	Vernon Park Amateurs		
Total		513	(1)
- * Club domestic league appearances and goals

Joseph Henry Butler (1879 – August 1941) was an English professional footballer who made 457 appearances as a goalkeeper in the Football League for Stockport County, Clapton Orient, Glossop, Sunderland and Lincoln City. With Sunderland, he won the 1912–13 First Division championship and played on the losing side in the 1913 FA Cup Final.

== Career statistics ==
Appearances and goals by club, season and competition
Club	Season	League			FA Cup		Other		Total	
Club	Season	Division	Apps	Goals	Apps	Goals	Apps	Goals	Apps	Goals
Stockport County	1900–01	Second Division	6	0	1	0	0	0	7	0
Stockport County	1901–02	Second Division	28	0	3	0	0	0	31	0
Stockport County	1902–03	Second Division	32	0	1	0	0	0	33	0
Stockport County	1903–04	Second Division	34	0	3	0	0	0	37	0
Stockport County	1904–05	Lancashire Combination First Division	33	1	5	0	0	0	38	1
Stockport County	Total		133	1	13	0	0	0	146	1
Clapton Orient	1905–06	Second Division	20	0	0	0	—		20	0
Stockport County	1905–06	Second Division	14	0	0	0	0	0	14	0
Stockport County	1906–07	Second Division	37	0	2	0	0	0	39	0
Stockport County	1907–08	Second Division	23	0	1	0	0	0	24	0
Stockport County	Total		207	1	16	0	0	0	223	1
Sunderland	1912–13	First Division	32	0	9	0	1 (Note: Appearance in Newcastle & Sunderland Hospitals Cup)	0	42	0
Sunderland	1913–14	First Division	33	0	5	0	1	0	39	0
Sunderland	Total		65	0	14	0	2	0	81	0
Lincoln City	1914–15	Second Division	37	0	2	0	—		39	0
Macclesfield	1919–20	Cheshire County League	23	0	0	0	3 (Note: 2 appearances in Altrincham Cup, 1 appearance in Cheshire Senior Cup)	0	26	0
Career total			352	1	32	0	5	0	389	1

== Honours ==
Sunderland

- Football League First Division: 1912–13
- Newcastle & Sunderland Hospitals Cup: 1912–13, 1913–14
