= Jimmy Leach =

English footballer

Personal information
- Full name: James McIntyre Leach
- Date of birth: 1 January 1891
- Place of birth: Spennymoor, England
- Date of death: 1961 (aged 69–70)
- Position: Wing-half

Senior career*
Years	Team	Apps	(Gls)
1908–1910	Newcastle St Wilfred's		
1910–1911	Spennymoor United		
1911–1912	Spen Black & White		
1912–1922	Aston Villa	67	(3)
1922	Queens Park Rangers	1	(0)
Total		68	(3)
- * Club domestic league appearances and goals

James McIntyre Leach (1 January 1891 – 1961) was an English footballer who played in the Football League for Aston Villa and Queens Park Rangers. Whilst at Aston Villa, Leach played in the 1913 FA Cup Final where they won 1–0 against Sunderland.

== Honours ==
Aston Villa

- FA Cup: 1912–13
