= James Richardson (footballer) =

Scottish footballer

Personal information
- Full name: James Robert Richardson
- Date of birth: 1885
- Place of birth: Bridgeton, Scotland
- Date of death: August 1951 (aged 65–66)
- Place of death: Cathcart, Scotland
- Position: Forward

Senior career*
Years	Team	Apps	(Gls)
–1907	Kirkintilloch Rob Roy		
1907–1910	Third Lanark	79	(54)
1910–1912	Huddersfield Town	42	(24)
1912–1914	Sunderland	35	(20)
1914–1921	Ayr United	159	(111)
1921–1922	Millwall	19	(4)
1922–1923	Mid-Annandale		

International career
1919	Scottish League XI	2	(2)
1919	Scotland (wartime)	2	(0)

Managerial career
- 1923–1924: Ayr United
- 1924–1925: Cowdenbeath
- * Club domestic league appearances and goals

James Richardson (1885 – August 1951) was a professional footballer and manager, who played for Third Lanark, Huddersfield Town, Sunderland, Ayr United and Millwall.

Richardson joined Sunderland in 1912 and played there for two years, scoring a total of 31 goals over 45 appearances. In his first season with Sunderland he helped them win the league for the first time since the 1894–95 season and the last time until the 1935–36 season. He also played in the 1913 FA Cup Final against Aston Villa, with Sunderland losing 1–0.

In the 1914–15 season, while playing for Ayr United, Richardson was joint top goalscorer in the Scottish league, with a total of 29 goals. In 1916, Richardson went to fight in France during the Great War. He returned in 1918 with stomach troubles, but was well enough to join the first team again on 2 November 1918, scoring a hat-trick against Hibernian in a match that ended 5–0.

After retiring as a player Richardson became a manager for several clubs, including Ayr United and Cowdenbeath. To this day, the 1924–25 season that Cowdenbeath played with Richardson as manager is still considered their greatest ever performance. For reasons unknown, despite having an incredible season, Richardson left the club after just one year as manager.

After retiring from management, Richardson remained a fan of Ayr United and was spotted at the club as a supporter just a few months prior to his death in August 1951. He remains Ayr United's third highest goalscorer, despite having missed two seasons due to active service. On 4 January 1921, Ayr United held a testimonial match at Somerset Park for Richardson, known amongst fans as "Jimmy's Day".
