= Arthur Dobson (footballer) =

English footballer

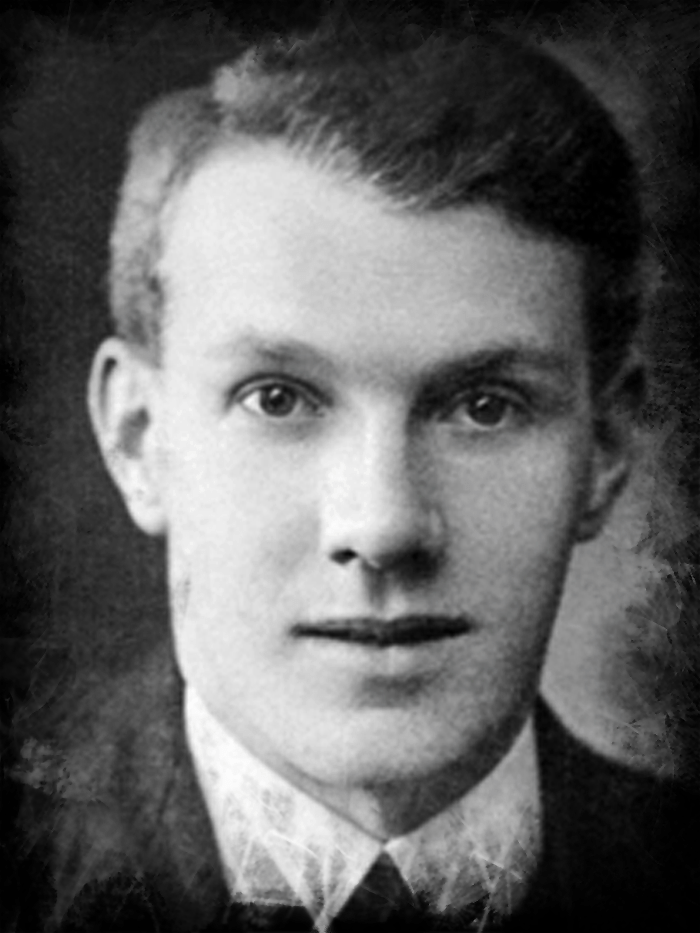

Personal information
- Full name: Henry Arthur Dobson
- Date of birth: 1 April 1893
- Place of birth: Chesterton, England
- Date of death: 29 March 1918 (aged 24)
- Place of death: Aisne, France
- Position: Wing half

Senior career*
Years	Team	Apps	(Gls)
1910–1911	Chesterton Foresters		
1911–1912	Audley		
1912–1918	Aston Villa	6	(0)
1917	→ Rotherham County (guest)	1	(0)
- * Club domestic league appearances and goals

Henry Arthur Dobson (1 April 1893 – 29 March 1918) was an English professional footballer who played in the Football League for Aston Villa as a wing half.

== Personal life ==
In December 1915, with the First World War underway, Dobson attested under the Derby Scheme and spent over a year in the Army Reserve. He was transferred into the North Staffordshire Regiment in February 1918. Dobson was wounded during a retreat from Saint-Quentin in the early days of the German spring offensive and died on 29 March 1918. He was buried in Prémont British Cemetery.

== Career statistics ==
Appearances and goals by club, season and competition
Club	Season	League			FA Cup		Total	
Club	Season	Division	Apps	Goals	Apps	Goals	Apps	Goals
Aston Villa	1912–13	First Division	1	0	0	0	1	0
Aston Villa	1914–15	First Division	5	0	1	0	6	0
Career total			6	0	1	0	7	0
