= Jackie Mordue =

English footballer (1886–1957)

Personal information
- Full name: John Mordue
- Date of birth: 13 December 1886
- Place of birth: Edmondsley, County Durham, England
- Date of death: 6 March 1938 (aged 51)
- Height: 5 ft 7 in (1.70 m)
- Position: Outside right

Youth career
- Sacriston

Senior career*
Years	Team	Apps	(Gls)
- Spennymoor United
1906–1907	Barnsley	25	(12)
1907–1908	Woolwich Arsenal	26	(1)
1908–1920	Sunderland	262	(71)
1920–1923	Middlesbrough	35	(1)
1923–1924	Durham City	6	(1)
- Ryhope Colliery Welfare
Total		354	(86)

International career
1912–1913	England	2	(0)

Managerial career
- 1923–1924: Durham City
- * Club domestic league appearances and goals

John Mordue (13 December 1886 – 6 March 1938) was an English footballer who played at outside right, and won the Football League championship with Sunderland in 1912–13 and made two appearances for England.

== Career ==
=== Early career ===
Mordue was born in Edmondsley, County Durham, the fifth son of Thomas Mordue, . As a youth he played for various local village teams and was spotted by Barnsley whilst playing for Spennymoor United. He joined the Oakwell club in October 1906, and played 25 Second Division games with 12 goals. In April the following year he moved to London when he was sold to Woolwich Arsenal for £450, where he linked up with his brother-in-law, goalkeeper Jimmy Ashcroft.

Mordue made his debut for Arsenal on 13 April 1907 and went on to play 28 games for Arsenal (26 in the First Division, two in the FA Cup) in thirteen months, scoring one goal. Arsenal finished 7th and 14th in the league in the 1906–07 and 1907–08 seasons, and Mordue was considered one of the team's best assets. With Woolwich Arsenal in financial trouble, he was sold for £750 to Sunderland, returning to his native north-east in May 1908.

=== Sunderland ===
He made his Sunderland debut on 9 September 1908 at Middlesbrough scoring in a 3–0 victory. He soon became a fixture at outside right, contributing some vital goals including one against Newcastle United in a 9–1 victory at St James' Park on 5 December 1908.

He went on to form an excellent partnership on the right-wing with Charlie Buchan and Francis Cuggy, his 15 goals helping the club to win the Football League Championship in 1913. Sunderland narrowly missed out on the Double, losing the FA Cup final 1–0 to Aston Villa, who themselves were runners-up in the League.

Mordue also became Sunderland's main penalty taker, scoring 26 in total, reaching the age of 34 before he missed one in a competitive game.

Mordue made two England appearances, making his debut against Ireland on 10 February 1912. In this match, he played alongside his Sunderland colleague George Holley as England ran out 6–1 victors. His second, and final, England match was also against Ireland a year later. In this match, Mordue was teamed up with his Sunderland colleagues Charlie Buchan and Francis Cuggy and although Buchan scored early in the game, England went down 2–1. Mordue also represented the Football League on three occasions.

Mordue left Sunderland in 1920, having played 294 games in total, with 80 goals.

=== Later career ===
He was sold to Middlesbrough in May 1920, spending three years at Ayresome Park before accepting the position of player-manager at Durham City in February 1923, a post he held for twelve months.

Mordue died on 6 March 1938.

== Honours ==
Sunderland

- The Football League champions: 1912–13
- FA Cup finalist: 1913
