= Doncaster, Charles County, Maryland =

Unincorporated community in Maryland, United States

Doncaster, Maryland
- Unincorporated community
- Location within Maryland
- Coordinates: 38°29′52″N 77°12′38″W
- Country: United States
- State: Maryland
- County: Charles
- Elevation: 144 ft (44 m)
- Time zone: UTC-5 (Eastern (EST))
  - Summer (DST): UTC-4 (EDT)
- Area codes: 301 & 240
- GNIS feature ID: 588643

Doncaster is an unincorporated community in Charles County, Maryland, United States. Doncaster is located at the junction of Maryland routes 6 and 344, 12.9 miles (20.8 km) west of La Plata.
