= James Roberts (footballer, born 1891) =

Welsh footballer

Personal information
- Full name: James Roberts
- Date of birth: January 7, 1891
- Place of birth: Mold, Wales
- Height: 5 ft 8 in (1.73 m)
- Position: Outside left

Senior career*
Years	Team	Apps	(Gls)
- Wrexham
1915	Everton	1	(0)
1921–1922	Tranmere Rovers	32	(1)
1922–	Crewe Alexandra		

International career
1913	Wales	2	(1)
- * Club domestic league appearances and goals

James Roberts (born 7 January 1891) was a Welsh footballer who earned two caps for the national team in 1913. He played as outside left for Wrexham, Everton, Tranmere Rovers and Crewe Alexandra.
