= Joseph Hodkinson =

English footballer (1889–1954)

Personal information
- Date of birth: 3 May 1889
- Place of birth: Lancaster, England
- Date of death: 18 June 1954 (aged 65)
- Place of death: Lancaster, England
- Height: 5 ft 8 in (1.73 m)
- Position: Outside left

Senior career*
Years	Team	Apps	(Gls)
- Lancaster Town
1909–1912	Glossop	84	(6)
1912–1922	Blackburn Rovers	228	(19)
- Lancaster Town

International career
1913–1919	England	3	(0)
- * Club domestic league appearances and goals

Joseph Hodkinson (3 May 1889 – 18 June 1954) was an English international footballer who played as an outside left.

== Career ==
Born in Lancaster, Hodkinson played professionally for Glossop and Blackburn Rovers, and earned three caps for England between 1913 and 1919. He also represented the Football League twice.
