= Stuart Doncaster =

English footballer

Personal information
- Full name: Stuart Richard Doncaster
- Date of birth: 1 September 1890
- Place of birth: West Burton, England
- Date of death: 1955 (aged 64–65)
- Place of death: Derbyshire, England
- Position: Centre forward

Senior career*
Years	Team	Apps	(Gls)
- Buxton
- Stourbridge
1912–1913	Aston Villa	2	(1)
1913	Glossop	15	(7)
- Matlock Town
- * Club domestic league appearances and goals

Stuart Richard Doncaster (1 September 1890 – 1955) was an English professional footballer who played as a centre forward in the Football League for Glossop and Aston Villa.

== Personal life ==
Doncaster enlisted in the Coldstream Guards in September 1908 and was still a private in the regiment when the First World War broke out in 1914. He was posted to the Western Front in August 1914 and due to a gunshot wound to the hand, he was discharged as "being no longer physically fit for war service" in July 1915.

== Career statistics ==
Appearances and goals by club, season and competition
Club	Season	League			FA Cup		Total	
Club	Season	Division	Apps	Goals	Apps	Goals	Apps	Goals
Aston Villa	1912–13	First Division	2	1	0	0	2	1
Career total			2	1	0	0	2	1
