= Walter Aitkenhead =

Scottish footballer

Personal information
- Full name: Walter Campbell Allison Aitkenhead
- Date of birth: 21 May 1887
- Place of birth: Maryhill, Glasgow, Scotland
- Date of death: 19 July 1966 (aged 79)
- Place of death: Cheadle, Cheshire, England
- Position: Forward

Youth career
- Maryhill Harp

Senior career*
Years	Team	Apps	(Gls)
1905–1906	Partick Thistle	4	(0)
1906–1918	Blackburn Rovers	210	(75)

International career^{‡}
1912	Scotland	1	(2)
- * Club domestic league appearances and goals as of 6 June 07 ‡ National team caps and goals as of 6 June 07

Walter Campbell Allison Aitkenhead (21 May 1887 – 19 July 1966) was a Scottish footballer who played for Partick Thistle, Blackburn Rovers and the Scotland national team.

Aitkenhead was born in Maryhill, Glasgow and played just four matches for his first club Partick Thistle before being signed by English club Blackburn Rovers in September 1906. He remained with Blackburn for the remainder of his career, winning the 1911-12 and 1913-14 league championships. He made just one appearance for Scotland, scoring twice in a 4–1 win against Ireland on 16 March 1912. He also took part in the Home Scots v Anglo-Scots international trial match in 1911 and 1914.

During the First World War he "guested" for Preston North End for several seasons. After retiring in 1918 he worked at management level in the Lancashire cotton industry, serving as chairman of a local firm in Blackburn for almost 40 years. He died at Cheadle Royal Hospital in Cheshire.
