= Charlie Buchan =

English footballer (1891–1960)

Charles Buchan
- Buchan on a cigarette card issued in 1911

Personal information
- Full name: Charles Murray Buchan
- Date of birth: 22 September 1891
- Place of birth: Plumstead, London, England
- Date of death: 25 June 1960 (aged 68)
- Place of death: Monte Carlo, Monaco
- Height: 6 ft 1 in (1.85 m)
- Position: Centre forward

Senior career*
Years	Team	Apps	(Gls)
1909–1910	Woolwich Arsenal	0	(0)
1910–1911	Leyton		
1911–1925	Sunderland	379	(209)
1925–1928	Arsenal	102	(49)
Total		481	(258)

International career
1913–1924	England	6	(4)
- * Club domestic league appearances and goals

Charles Murray Buchan MM (22 September 1891 – 25 June 1960) was an English footballer, sporting journalist and commentator.

Buchan started his career in 1909 with Woolwich Arsenal (later renamed Arsenal F.C.). He is known for his career with Sunderland, where he became leading scorer for 7 of his 9 seasons with the club. He remains the club's all-time record League goalscorer. He was a winner of the First Division title in 1913, and reached the 1913 FA Cup Final with Sunderland.

Buchan served with the Sherwood Foresters during the First World War and was awarded the Military Medal for his service.

He re-joined Arsenal in 1925, and saw the club to their first FA Cup final in 1927. Along with Herbert Chapman, Buchan was a pioneer of Arsenal's adoption of the WM formation, which brought significant success for the club in the 1930s. He was capped six times by England, scoring four goals.

After retiring from football, Buchan became a football journalist with The Daily News - later renamed to News Chronicle. He also commentated for the BBC. In 1947, he co-founded the Football Writers' Association. From 1951, he edited his own football magazine - Charles Buchan's Football Monthly.

== Playing career ==
=== Early career ===
Buchan first played as an amateur for local club Woolwich Arsenal, joining the club in December 1909. Whilst he impressed in reserve games, disagreements with manager George Morrell over his expenses caused Buchan to decline to sign a professional contract.

Buchan moved to Northfleet United as an amateur for the remainder of the 1909–10 season. He won Kent Senior Cup, Kent League and Thames and Medway Combination medals. In the close season he signed for Southern League club Leyton. He was spotted by Sunderland A.F.C. scouts in 1911, and was signed shortly after.

=== Sunderland and Wartime ===
A tall, elegant centre forward, Buchan was highly successful at the Wearside club. Sunderland won the 1912–13 First Division title and narrowly missed out on the Double - losing the FA Cup final 1–0 to Aston Villa. Frequently described as the best footballer in the country, Buchan was Sunderland's leading scorer for seven of his eight seasons at the club. This tally excludes the World War I seasons, when full competitive football was suspended. He is Sunderland's all-time record League goalscorer, with 209 goals. Buchan was also capped by England - his debut coming against Ireland on 15 February 1913.

During the First World War, Buchan served with the Grenadier Guards and then the Sherwood Foresters. He was awarded the Military Medal and on 11 September 1918 was promoted to temporary second lieutenant for the final months of the war.

In 1925, Buchan left Sunderland. He was replaced by Dave Halliday, who scored at least 35 league goals in his four full seasons at Sunderland, becoming the most prolific goals-to-games performer in the club's history.

While at Sunderland, Buchan also played cricket for Durham in the 1920 Minor Counties Championship.

=== Arsenal ===
Buchan was re-signed by Arsenal. Sunderland manager Bob Kyle initially demanded a £4,000 fee, but Arsenal manager Herbert Chapman bargained him down to £2,000 plus £100 per league goal scored by Buchan during his first season. Buchan made his debut in a North London derby against Tottenham Hotspur on 29 August 1925. He ultimately scored nineteen league goals during that first season.

Just as important as his goals was his contribution to Arsenal's tactics. Along with Chapman, Buchan contributed to Arsenal's development of the WM formation to fully exploit the relaxation of the offside law. Buchan's idea was to move the centre half from a roaming position in midfield to a "stopper" position in defence, with one forward brought back into midfield. This meant the offside trap was no longer the responsibility of the two full-backs, but the single central defender, while the full backs were pushed wider to cover the wings. Eventually the change in tactic would bring Arsenal great success in the 1930s.

Buchan was a regular at Arsenal for three seasons. He captained Arsenal to their first ever Cup final in 1927, which they lost 1–0 to Cardiff City. Buchan finally retired at the end of 1927–28, having scored 16 league goals that season despite being 36 years of age. In all he scored 56 goals in 120 matches for Arsenal. Upon his retirement after scoring 258 league goals, (which would have been more had the First World War not intervened) he was the second highest goalscorer in the top flight, only Steve Bloomer had scored more, 314 for Derby County and Middlesbrough. Today he is ranked 6th as the all time top flight top scorer, and in the Football League's all-time top scorer list, he is ranked 33rd.

== Later career ==
After retiring, Buchan became a football journalist with Daily News which was later renamed News Chronicle. He also commentated for the BBC. In 1947, he co-founded the Football Writers' Association. From September 1951 until his death, he edited his own football magazine, Charles Buchan's Football Monthly.

He published his autobiography, A Lifetime in Football, in 1955. Buchan died in 1960, at the age of 68, whilst holidaying in Monte Carlo.

== Career statistics ==
=== Club ===
Goals and appearances by club, season and competition.

Appearances and goals by club, season and competition
Club	Season	League			FA Cup		Total	
Club	Season	Division	Apps	Goals	Apps	Goals	Apps	Goals
Sunderland	1910−11	First Division	6	1	0	0	6	1
Sunderland	1911−12	First Division	31	7	4	0	35	7
Sunderland	1912−13	First Division	36	27	9	3	45	30
Sunderland	1913−14	First Division	36	13	5	2	41	15
Sunderland	1914−15	First Division	37	23	1	0	38	23
Sunderland	1919−20	First Division	36	22	4	5	40	27
Sunderland	1920−21	First Division	39	27	1	0	40	27
Sunderland	1921−22	First Division	40	21	2	0	42	21
Sunderland	1922−23	First Division	41	30	2	1	43	31
Sunderland	1923−24	First Division	39	26	1	1	40	27
Sunderland	1924−25	First Division	38	12	3	1	41	13
Sunderland	Total		379	209	32	13	411	222
Arsenal	1925−26	First Division	39	19	6	1	45	20
Arsenal	1926−27	First Division	33	14	7	5	40	19
Arsenal	1927−28	First Division	30	16	5	1	35	17
Arsenal	Total		102	49	18	7	120	56
Career total			481	258	50	20	531	278

=== International ===
England score listed first, score column indicates score after each Buchan goal

List of international goals scored by Charlie Buchan
No.	Date	Venue	Cap	Opponent	Score	Result	Competition	Ref.
1	15 February 1913	Windsor Park, Belfast, Ireland	1	Ireland	1–0	1–2	1912–13 British Home Championship	
2	15 March 1920	Arsenal Stadium, London, England	2	Wales	1–0	1–2	1919−20 British Home Championship	
3	21 May 1921	Stade du Daring Club de Bruxelles, Brussels, Belgium	4	Belgium	1–0	2–0	Friendly	
4	10 May 1923	Stade Pershing, Bois de Vincennes, France	5	France	2–0	4–1	Friendly	

== Honours ==
Sunderland

- Football League First Division: 1912–13
- FA Cup runner-up: 1912–13

Arsenal

- FA Cup runner-up: 1926–27

England

- British Home Championship: 1912–13

Individual

- First Division Golden Boot: 1922–23
- English Football Hall of Fame: 2013

== See also ==
- List of English football first tier top scorers
- List of footballers in England by number of league goals
