= Charlie Wallace =

English footballer

Personal information
- Full name: Charles William Wallace
- Date of birth: 20 January 1885
- Place of birth: Sunderland, England
- Date of death: 7 January 1970 (aged 84)
- Height: 5 ft 7 in (1.70 m)
- Position: Outside forward

Youth career
- 1901: Rectory Park
- 1903–1905: Southwick

Senior career*
Years	Team	Apps	(Gls)
1905–1907	Crystal Palace	56	(13)
1907–1921	Aston Villa	314	(?)
1921–1923	Oldham Athletic	47	(3)

International career
1913–1920	England	3	(0)
- * Club domestic league appearances and goals

Charles William Wallace (20 January 1885 – 7 January 1970) was an English footballer who played for Aston Villa, Crystal Palace and Oldham Athletic.

== Playing career ==
Wallace was born in Sunderland and played for local club Southwick before signing with Crystal Palace for the club's inaugural season of 1905–06. He was initially signed as a reserve player, but made the transition to first team football, making 19 League appearances that season (out of 24), scoring five goals and helping Palace to win the Southern League second division title and promotion to division one. The next season, Wallace missed only one of 38 games, scoring eight goals, and in the 1907 close season moved on to Aston Villa.

Wallace made 314 League appearances for Aston Villa over 14 years but only 9 competitive seasons due to sport being interrupted by the outbreak of World War I.

Wallace was the first player to miss a penalty kick in an FA Cup Final, when he missed the target from the spot in 1913 against Sunderland at London's Crystal Palace. A penalty kick miss would not occur again in an FA Cup Final until 1988, when Liverpool player John Aldridge had his penalty saved by Wimbledon goalkeeper Dave Beasant. Villa still went on to win 1–0 in the 1913 FA Cup Final, despite Wallace's penalty miss. Villa's goal that day came from Tommy Barber courtesy of a Wallace assist from a corner kick. Wallace also played in Villa's 1920 FA Cup Final winning side.

In 1921 Wallace moved on to Oldham Athletic before retiring from playing in 1923 when he returned to Aston Villa as a coach and scout. He also spent time as a dressing room attendant and steward with the club, until retiring in 1960.

Wallace's honours included a league championship in 1910 and two FA Cup winner's medals, in 1913 and 1920.

Wallace was also capped 3 times for England, making his debut on 17 March 1913 in a 4–3 victory against Wales at Ashton Gate. He went on to gain his second cap in a 3–0 defeat to Ireland at Ayresome Park on 14 February 1914 in front of 25,000 spectators. His final cap for England came in a famous 5–4 victory against Scotland in front of 40,000 at Hillsborough on 10 April 1920.

== Later career ==
After retiring from full-time football, Wallace also worked as a painter and decorator.

Charlie Wallace died on 26 January 1970, aged 85.

== Honours ==
Aston Villa

- FA Cup: 1912–13, 1919–20
