= Charlie Gladwin =

English footballer

Personal information
- Full name: Charles Edward Gladwin
- Date of birth: 9 December 1887
- Place of birth: Worksop, England
- Date of death: February 1952 (aged 64)
- Place of death: Rotherham, England
- Position: Full-back

Youth career
- Dinnington Main Colliery Welfare

Senior career*
Years	Team	Apps	(Gls)
1908–1912	Blackpool	87	(0)
1912–1919	Sunderland	54	(0)
1919–192?	Watford		
- * Club domestic league appearances and goals

Charles Edward Gladwin (9 December 1887 – February 1952) was an English professional footballer who played as a full-back for Blackpool and Sunderland.
