= Billy Bradshaw (footballer) =

English footballer and manager

Personal information
- Full name: William Bradshaw
- Date of birth: 3 April 1884
- Place of birth: Padiham, England
- Date of death: June 1955 (aged 71)
- Position: Left half

Senior career*
Years	Team	Apps	(Gls)
- Padiham
- Accrington Stanley
1903–1920	Blackburn Rovers	386	(36)
1920	Rochdale		

International career
1910–1913	England	4	(0)

Managerial career
- 1920: Rochdale
- * Club domestic league appearances and goals

William Bradshaw (3 April 1884 – June 1955) was an English football player and manager. Bradshaw played at both professional and international levels as a left half.

== Career ==
=== Club career ===
Born in Padiham, Bradshaw began his career with Padiham and Accrington Stanley. Bradshaw was a left-half, but was extremely adept at joining the attack and was referred to in one report as "being as good as having a sixth forward"; he was also an expert penalty-taker. He signed for Blackburn Rovers in May 1903 for a fee of £20, and spent 17 years at the club, scoring 36 goals in 386 appearances in the Football League before leaving in 1920. During his time at the Ewood Park club, he helped them win the Football League championship in 1912 and 1914.

In April 1920, he was released by Blackburn to become player-manager of Rochdale, but left that position in September of the same year.

=== International career ===
Bradshaw made his international debut in February 1910, and earned a total of four caps between then and 1913. He also represented the Football League on three occasions.

== Honours ==
Blackburn Rovers

- Football League championship: 1911–12 and 1913–14
