= Sam Hardy (footballer) =

English footballer (1882–1966)

Personal information
- Full name: Sam Hardy
- Date of birth: 26 August 1882
- Place of birth: Newbold, England
- Date of death: 24 October 1966 (aged 84)
- Place of death: Chesterfield, England
- Height: 5 ft 9 1/2 in (1.77 m)
- Position: Goalkeeper

Youth career
- 1898–1900: Newbold Church School
- 1900–1903: Newbold White Star

Senior career*
Years	Team	Apps	(Gls)
1903–1905	Chesterfield	71	(0)
1905–1912	Liverpool	219	(0)
1912–1921	Aston Villa	159	(0)
1921–1925	Nottingham Forest	102	(0)
Total		551	(0)

International career
1907–1920	England	21	(0)
- * Club domestic league appearances and goals

Sam Hardy (26 August 1882 – 24 October 1966) was an English footballer who played as a goalkeeper.

== Football career ==
=== Chesterfield ===
In 1903, Chesterfield manager Jack Hoskin beat Derby County to sign Hardy, doing so under a lamp post in Newbold. Hardy, something of a shrewd character, would not sign the forms until Hoskin promised to pay him 18 shillings when the original offer was five shillings. Hardy soon gained himself a reputation for being unfazeable and it wasn't long before he started attracting the attention of the top clubs in the country.

=== Liverpool ===
Liverpool manager Tom Watson had witnessed him play against his side in a Second Division fixture at Anfield, on 7 January 1905. Although Liverpool won the match 6–1, Watson remembered that if it hadn't been for the performance of Hardy that day, Liverpool could well have gone on to record their biggest-ever win. After 77 appearances, in which Hardy kept 30 clean-sheets, Watson approached both Chesterfield and Hardy and signed him in May 1905. As part of the bargain, Liverpool offered Chesterfield a friendly match to be played at Chesterfield. The transfer offer was originally £300. But the friendly never took place, and so Liverpool raised their offer and bought Sam Hardy for £340. When he came to Liverpool, Ned Doig was their goalkeeper. Hardy made his first team debut in the ninth game of the 1905–06 season, on 21 October 1905 at Anfield. The match was against Nottingham Forest. Hardy played that day because Ned Doig was suffering from rheumatism. Liverpool won the game 4–1 and Sam Hardy established himself as their first choice goalkeeper.

By the end of his first season he had bagged a Football League First Division championship medal as Liverpool won their second title in five years. Hardy made 30 league (and 5 cup) appearances during the 1905–06 season as the Reds beat Preston North End by four points in the two points for a win system.

In 1907, Hardy caught the eye of the Football Association committee who gave him his England debut on 16 February at Goodison Park; Ireland were the opponents and Hardy gained his first clean-sheet as England won 1–0.

Hardy became one of the best goalkeepers of his generation over the next few seasons and by the time he was allowed to leave Anfield in 1912 he had earned himself the nickname 'Safe and Steady Sam'. He had made 240 appearances between the sticks for the Reds, which included 63 clean-sheets.

=== Aston Villa ===
Hardy was transferred to Aston Villa in June 1912. During his time at Aston Villa he won two FA Cups in 1913 and 1920.

Like so many other professionals, his career was interrupted by the outbreak of the First World War. Hardy kept his eye in during the conflict playing for his own club, Villa, four times, along with Plymouth Argyle, and Nottingham Forest. Forest did not concede any goals between 8 November 1915, and 2 January 1916 during part of the time Hardy was playing for them. Sam went into the Navy in 1916, but went back to Forest in 1918 and helped them to win a Midland title.

In 1921 he left Villa after making 183 appearances.

=== Nottingham Forest ===
He joined Nottingham Forest in August 1921. The transfer fee was £1000, and Hardy helped them to the Second Division title by the end of his first season at the club in 1922. He played his last game for Forest on 4 October 1924, after making 109 appearances for the team.

By the end of his international days, Hardy had played for 13 years as England's goalkeeper, earning himself 21 caps. He had seven clean sheets for the national team.

Sam Hardy retired in 1925. Upon retirement, he became a publican, keeping pubs and billiard halls in the Chesterfield area and remained so until his death aged 84 on 24 October 1966.

Charlie Buchan regarded Sam Hardy as the best goalkeeper that he had ever played against. Billy Walker and Herbert Chapman regarded Hardy as the best goalkeeper that they had seen. In 1998 Hardy appeared on the BBC's Football League 100 Legends list. He also was voted in at No. 94 in the official Liverpool Football Club web site poll.

== Personal life ==
Hardy was a relative of Nottingham Forest manager Stan Hardy. His son Jack Hardy, grandson Sam, nephew Edgar and cousins Ernest and Harry all became footballers. He served as an ordinary seaman in the Royal Navy during the First World War.

== Honours ==
Newbold White Star

- Byron Cup: 1901–02

Liverpool

- Football League First Division: 1905–06

Aston Villa

- FA Cup: 1912–13, 1919–20

Nottingham Forest

- Football League Second Division: 1921–22

== See also ==
- List of footballers in England by number of league appearances (500+)
