= Bob Kyle =

Irish football manager

Robert H. Kyle (16 December 1870 – 17 February 1941) was an Irish football manager during the 1900s, 1910s and 1920s.

A native of Belfast, Kyle was club secretary (overseeing the whole club including coaching/training) at Distillery in the Irish League from June 1897 to 1905. During this time "the Whites" claimed three League titles, two Irish Cups, one City Cup, three County Antrim Shields and one Belfast Charity Cup.

Kyle was invited to become secretary-manager at Sunderland in August 1905, remaining in the role until retiring on 15 March 1928. He thus remains Sunderland's longest serving manager. During Kyle's time in charge Sunderland claimed the Football League title in 1913 and finished as runners-up in 1923. He is the only Irish manager ever to win the English top division.

== Managerial stats ==
As of 16 September 2007.

Team	Nat.	From	To	Record				
Team	Nat.	From	To	G	W	L	D	Win %
Distillery	(Northern Ireland)	1 August 1897	1 August 1905	227	114	43	70	50.22
Sunderland	(England)	1 August 1905	1 March 1928	803	367	283	153	45.70

== See also ==
- List of English football championship-winning managers
