= 1912–13 FA Cup =

Tournament details
- Country: England

Final positions
- Champions: Aston Villa (5th title)
- Runners-up: Sunderland

The 1912–13 FA Cup was the 42nd season of the world's oldest association football competition, the Football Association Challenge Cup (more usually known as the FA Cup). Aston Villa won the competition for the fifth time, beating Sunderland 1–0 in the final at Crystal Palace, London. Villa's triumph ended a series of new FA Cup winners which had occurred since 1909.

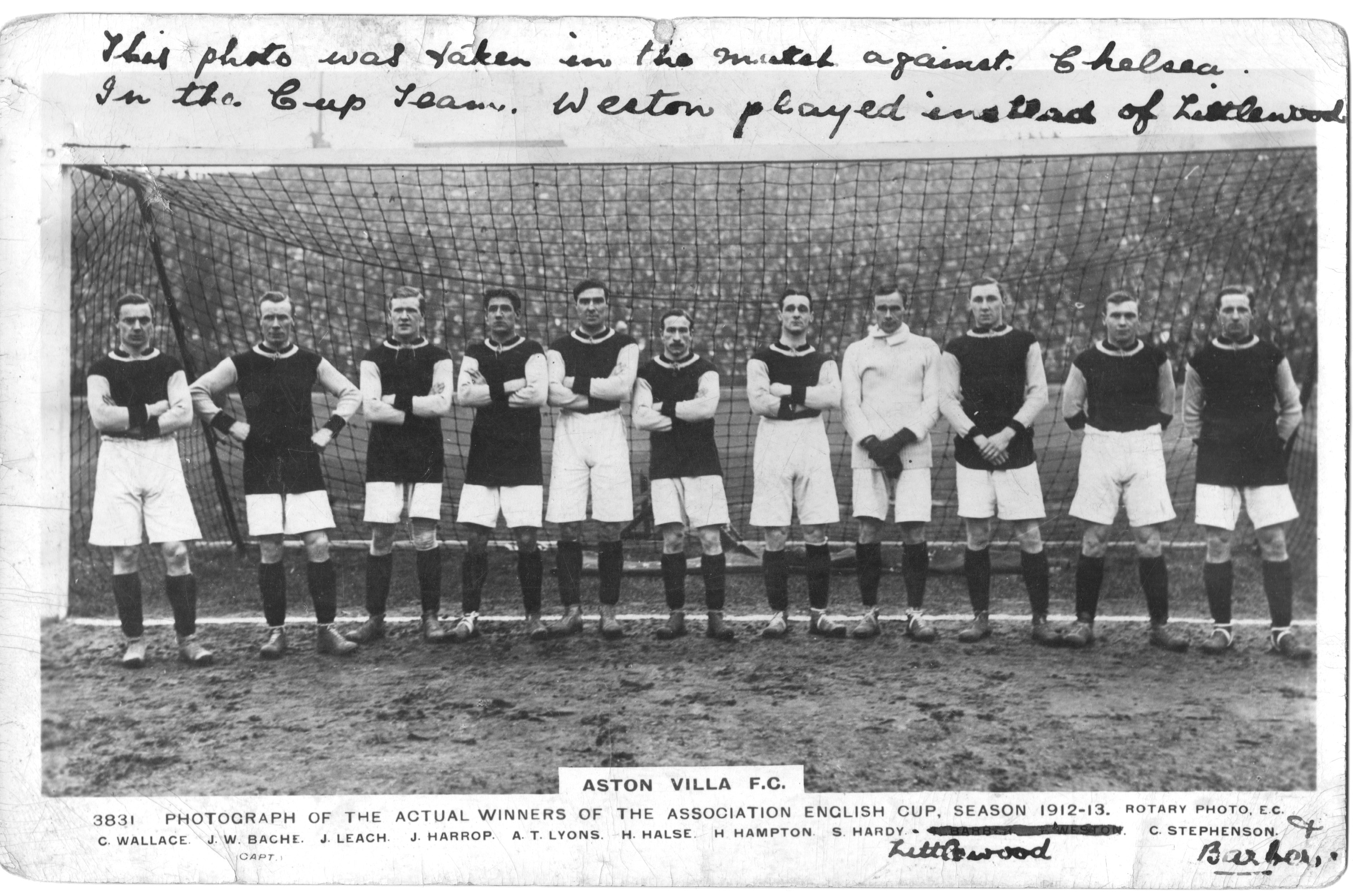
1913 Aston Villa team after pre-cup game with Chelsea. The three players far right are Littlewood (who did not appear in the cup final), Stephenson, and Barber. Tommy Weston, who did appear in the cup rounds, is not shown.

== Calendar ==
The format of the FA Cup for the season had two preliminary rounds, five qualifying rounds, four proper rounds, and the semi-finals and final.

| Round | Date |
|---|---|
| Extra preliminary round | Saturday 14 September 1912 |
| Preliminary round | Saturday 28 September 1912 |
| First round qualifying | Saturday 12 October 1912 |
| Second round qualifying | Saturday 2 November 1912 |
| Third round qualifying | Saturday 16 November 1912 |
| Fourth round qualifying | Saturday 30 November 1912 |
| Fifth round qualifying | Saturday 14 December 1912 |
| First round proper | Saturday 11 January 1913 |
| Second round proper | Saturday 1 February 1913 |
| Third round proper | Saturday 22 February 1913 |
| Fourth round proper | Saturday 8 March 1913 |
| Semi-finals | Saturday 29 March 1913 |
| Final | Saturday 19 April 1913 |

== Qualifying rounds ==
The 12 teams winning through to the first round proper from the fifth qualifying round were Glossop and Stockport County from the Football League Second Division, as well as non-league sides Rochdale, Halifax Town, Gillingham, London Caledonians, Barrow, Southend United, South Shields, Croydon Common, Chesterfield and Gainsborough Trinity. Rochdale, Halifax Town and South Shields qualified for the main competition for the first time, while London Caledonians had not appeared at this stage since 1887-88.

Of the 86 clubs entered in this season's extra preliminary round, the most successful were Willenhall Pickwick and Kingston-on-Thames who both progressed to the fourth qualifying round. Willenhall's vanquished opponents included non-league heavyweights Brierley Hill Alliance and Worcester City before they went out to Stockport County, while Kingston-on-Thames had wins over Dorking and Nunhead before losing to Southall at Western Road.

== First round proper ==
37 of the 40 clubs from the First and Second Divisions joined the 12 clubs who came through the qualifying rounds. The other three League clubs, Glossop, Stockport County and Lincoln City were entered in the fourth qualifying round, with Lincoln going out in the fifth qualifying round to South Shields.

To bring the number of teams up to 64, fifteen Southern League First Division clubs were given byes to the first round. These were: Swindon Town, Southampton, Reading, Northampton Town, Stoke, West Ham United, Norwich City, Queens Park Rangers, Bristol Rovers, Portsmouth, Brighton & Hove Albion, Coventry City, Plymouth Argyle, Millwall and Crystal Palace.

The 32 matches were played on various dates between Saturday 11 January and Saturday 18 January 1913, with nine replays and a second replay being played on various dates between Wednesday 15 January and Wednesday 22 January.

| Tie no | Home team | Score | Away team | Date |
|---|---|---|---|---|
| 1 | Chesterfield | 1–4 | Nottingham Forest | 18 January 1913 |
| 2 | Liverpool | 3–0 | Bristol City | 15 January 1913 |
| 3 | Rochdale | 0–2 | Swindon Town | 11 January 1913 |
| 4 | South Shields | 0–1 | Gainsborough Trinity | 18 January 1913 |
| 5 | Southampton | 1–1 | Bury | 11 January 1913 |
| Replay | Bury | 2–1 | Southampton | 15 January 1913 |
| 6 | Stoke | 2–2 | Reading | 16 January 1913 |
| Replay | Reading | 3–0 | Stoke | 22 January 1913 |
| 7 | Gillingham | 0–0 | Barnsley | 11 January 1913 |
| Replay | Barnsley | 3–1 | Gillingham | 16 January 1913 |
| 8 | Blackburn Rovers | 7–2 | Northampton Town | 18 January 1913 |
| 9 | The Wednesday | 5–1 | Grimsby Town | 16 January 1913 |
| 10 | Wolverhampton Wanderers | 3–1 | London Caledonians | 18 January 1913 |
| 11 | West Bromwich Albion | 1–1 | West Ham United | 13 January 1913 |
| Replay | West Ham United | 2–2 | West Bromwich Albion | 16 January 1913 |
| Replay | West Ham United | 3–0+ | West Bromwich Albion | 22 January 1913 |
| 12 | Sunderland | 6–0 | Clapton Orient | 11 January 1913 |
| 13 | Derby County | 1–3 | Aston Villa | 15 January 1913 |
| 14 | Everton | 5–1 | Stockport County | 15 January 1913 |
| 15 | Leicester Fosse | 1–4 | Norwich City | 16 January 1913 |
| 16 | Newcastle United | 1–0 | Bradford City | 16 January 1913 |
| 17 | Tottenham Hotspur | 1–1 | Blackpool | 11 January 1913 |
| Replay | Blackpool | 1–6 | Tottenham Hotspur | 16 January 1913 |
| 18 | Manchester City | 4–0 | Birmingham | 11 January 1913 |
| 19 | Queens Park Rangers | 4–2 | Halifax Town | 11 January 1913 |
| 20 | Fulham | 0–2 | Hull City | 11 January 1913 |
| 21 | Bristol Rovers | 2–0 | Notts County | 11 January 1913 |
| 22 | Portsmouth | 1–2 | Brighton & Hove Albion | 15 January 1913 |
| 23 | Manchester United | 1–1 | Coventry City | 11 January 1913 |
| Replay | Coventry City | 1–2 | Manchester United | 16 January 1913 |
| 24 | Plymouth Argyle | 2–0 | Preston North End | 11 January 1913 |
| 25 | Millwall | 0–0 | Middlesbrough | 11 January 1913 |
| Replay | Middlesbrough | 4–1 | Millwall | 15 January 1913 |
| 26 | Leeds City | 2–3 | Burnley | 15 January 1913 |
| 27 | Oldham Athletic | 2–0 | Bolton Wanderers | 11 January 1913 |
| 28 | Crystal Palace | 2–0 | Glossop | 11 January 1913 |
| 29 | Chelsea | 5–2 | Southend United | 11 January 1913 |
| 30 | Croydon Common | 0–0 | Woolwich Arsenal | 11 January 1913 |
| Replay | Woolwich Arsenal | 2–1 | Croydon Common | 15 January 1913 |
| 31 | Bradford Park Avenue | 1–1 | Barrow | 15 January 1913 |
| Replay | Bradford Park Avenue | 1–0 | Barrow | 22 January 1913 |
| 32 | Huddersfield Town | 3–1 | Sheffield United | 15 January 1913 |

+^{Match played at Stamford Bridge}

== Second round proper ==
15 of the 16 second-round matches were played on Saturday 1 February 1913. Four matches were drawn, with the replays taking place in the following midweek . One of these went to a second replay the following week.

| Tie no | Home team | Score | Away team | Date |
|---|---|---|---|---|
| 1 | Burnley | 4–1 | Gainsborough Trinity | 1 February 1913 |
| 2 | Reading | 1–0 | Tottenham Hotspur | 1 February 1913 |
| 3 | Aston Villa | 5–0 | West Ham United | 1 February 1913 |
| 4 | Middlesbrough | 3–2 | Queens Park Rangers | 1 February 1913 |
| 5 | Sunderland | 2–0 | Manchester City | 5 February 1913 |
| 6 | Woolwich Arsenal | 1–4 | Liverpool | 1 February 1913 |
| 7 | Barnsley | 2–3 | Blackburn Rovers | 1 February 1913 |
| 8 | Bristol Rovers | 1–1 | Norwich City | 1 February 1913 |
| Replay | Norwich City | 2–2 | Bristol Rovers | 6 February 1913 |
| Replay+ | Bristol Rovers | 1–0 | Norwich City | 10 February 1913 |
| 9 | Brighton & Hove Albion | 0–0 | Everton | 1 February 1913 |
| Replay | Everton | 1–0 | Brighton & Hove Albion | 5 February 1913 |
| 10 | Plymouth Argyle | 0–2 | Manchester United | 1 February 1913 |
| 11 | Hull City | 0–0 | Newcastle United | 1 February 1913 |
| Replay | Newcastle United | 3–0 | Hull City | 5 February 1913 |
| 12 | Oldham Athletic | 5–1 | Nottingham Forest | 1 February 1913 |
| 13 | Crystal Palace | 2–0 | Bury | 1 February 1913 |
| 14 | Chelsea | 1–1 | The Wednesday | 1 February 1913 |
| Replay | The Wednesday | 6–0 | Chelsea | 5 February 1913 |
| 15 | Bradford Park Avenue | 3–0 | Wolverhampton Wanderers | 1 February 1913 |
| 16 | Huddersfield Town | 1–2 | Swindon Town | 1 February 1913 |

+ match played at neutral venue (Stamford Bridge).

== Third round proper ==
The eight third-round matches were played on Saturday 22 February 1913. There were two replays, played in the following midweek.

| Tie no | Home team | Score | Away team | Date |
|---|---|---|---|---|
| 1 | Burnley | 3–1 | Middlesbrough | 22 February 1913 |
| 2 | Liverpool | 1–1 | Newcastle United | 22 February 1913 |
| Replay | Newcastle United | 1–0 | Liverpool | 26 February 1913 |
| 3 | Reading | 1–2 | Blackburn Rovers | 22 February 1913 |
| 4 | Aston Villa | 5–0 | Crystal Palace | 22 February 1913 |
| 5 | Sunderland | 4–2 | Swindon Town | 22 February 1913 |
| 6 | Bristol Rovers | 0–4 | Everton | 22 February 1913 |
| 7 | Oldham Athletic | 0–0 | Manchester United | 22 February 1913 |
| Replay | Manchester United | 1–2 | Oldham Athletic | 26 February 1913 |
| 8 | Bradford Park Avenue | 2–1 | The Wednesday | 22 February 1913 |

== Fourth round proper ==
The four fourth-round (quarter-final) matches were played on 8 March 1913. There was one replay, the Tyne-Wear derby between Newcastle United and Sunderland, played on 12 March. This went to a second replay, which Sunderland won.

| Tie no | Home team | Score | Away team | Date |
|---|---|---|---|---|
| 1 | Blackburn Rovers | 0–1 | Burnley | 8 March 1913 |
| 2 | Sunderland | 0–0 | Newcastle United | 8 March 1913 |
| Replay | Newcastle United | 2–2 | Sunderland | 12 March 1913 |
| Replay | Newcastle United | 0–3 | Sunderland | 17 March 1913 |
| 3 | Everton | 0–1 | Oldham Athletic | 8 March 1913 |
| 4 | Bradford Park Avenue | 0–5 | Aston Villa | 8 March 1913 |

== Semi-finals ==
The semi-finals were played on 29 March 1913. The Burnley–Sunderland match went to a replay, which Sunderland won, going on to meet Aston Villa in the final.

29 March 1913

| Sunderland | 0–0 | Burnley |

Bramall Lane, Sheffield (Sheffield United's ground)

Replay

2 April 1913

| Sunderland | 3–2 | Burnley |

St Andrew's, Birmingham (Birmingham City's ground)

29 March 1913

| Aston Villa | 1–0 | Oldham Athletic |

Ewood Park, Blackburn (Blackburn Rovers' ground)

== Final ==
The final was contested by Aston Villa and Sunderland on 19 April 1913 at London's Crystal Palace. Aston Villa won 1–0, with a goal by Tommy Barber assisted by a crossed ball from Charlie Wallace. Wallace had earlier missed a penalty, something that would not occur again in FA Cup Final, until the 1988 final between Wimbledon and Liverpool.

=== Match details ===
19 April 1913
15:00 BST

| Aston Villa | 1–0 | Sunderland |
|---|---|---|
| Tommy Barber 78' |

Crystal Palace
Attendance: 121,919
Referee: Mr. A. Adams (Nottingham)

| Aston Villa | Sunderland |
