= 1912–13 in English football =

Football in England
- Season: 1912–13

Men's football
- Football League: Sunderland
- Football League Second Division: Preston North End
- FA Cup: Aston Villa

The 1912–13 season was the 42nd season of competitive football in England. Sunderland won the First Division for the fifth time, with a record of 25–4–9; Aston Villa, finishing second, had fewer defeats, but a lot more draws: 19–12–7. Blackburn Rovers won the Charity Shield for the first time in a close match (2–1) with Queens Park Rangers. Aston Villa won the FA Cup Final against Sunderland (1–0) and obtained their fifth cup. Notts County and Woolwich Arsenal were relegated to the Second Division; Preston North End and Burnley were promoted to the First Division. Lincoln City returned to the Football League once again, at the expense of Gainsborough Trinity.

== Honours ==
Competition	Winner
First Division	Sunderland (5)
Second Division	Preston North End
FA Cup	Aston Villa (5*)
Charity Shield	Blackburn Rovers
Home Championship	England

Notes = Number in parentheses is the times that club has won that honour. * indicates new record for competition

== League tables ==
=== First Division ===
Pos	Team	Pld	W	D	L	GF	GA	GAv	Pts	Relegation
1	Sunderland (C)	38	25	4	9	86	43	2.000	54	
2	Aston Villa	38	19	12	7	86	52	1.654	50	
3	The Wednesday	38	21	7	10	75	55	1.364	49	
4	Manchester United	38	19	8	11	69	43	1.605	46	
5	Blackburn Rovers	38	16	13	9	79	43	1.837	45	
6	Manchester City	38	18	8	12	53	37	1.432	44	
7	Derby County	38	17	8	13	69	66	1.045	42	
8	Bolton Wanderers	38	16	10	12	62	63	0.984	42	
9	Oldham Athletic	38	14	14	10	50	55	0.909	42	
10	West Bromwich Albion	38	13	12	13	57	50	1.140	38	
11	Everton	38	15	7	16	48	54	0.889	37	
12	Liverpool	38	16	5	17	61	71	0.859	37	
13	Bradford City	38	12	11	15	50	60	0.833	35	
14	Newcastle United	38	13	8	17	47	47	1.000	34	
15	Sheffield United	38	14	6	18	56	70	0.800	34	
16	Middlesbrough	38	11	10	17	55	69	0.797	32	
17	Tottenham Hotspur	38	12	6	20	45	72	0.625	30	
18	Chelsea	38	11	6	21	51	73	0.699	28	
19	Notts County (R)	38	7	9	22	28	56	0.500	23	Relegation to the Second Division
20	Woolwich Arsenal (R)	38	3	12	23	26	74	0.351	18	Relegation to the Second Division

Source: World Football
Rules for classification: 1) Points; 2) Goal average; 3) Goals scored
(C) Champions; (R) Relegated

=== Second Division ===
Pos	Team	Pld	W	D	L	GF	GA	GAv	Pts	Promotion
1	Preston North End (C, P)	38	19	15	4	56	33	1.697	53	Promotion to the First Division
2	Burnley (P)	38	21	8	9	88	53	1.660	50	Promotion to the First Division
3	Birmingham	38	18	10	10	59	44	1.341	46	
4	Barnsley	38	19	7	12	57	47	1.213	45	
5	Huddersfield Town	38	17	9	12	66	40	1.650	43	
6	Leeds City	38	15	10	13	70	64	1.094	40	
7	Grimsby Town	38	15	10	13	51	50	1.020	40	
8	Lincoln City	38	15	10	13	50	52	0.962	40	
9	Fulham	38	17	5	16	65	55	1.182	39	
10	Wolverhampton Wanderers	38	14	10	14	56	54	1.037	38	
11	Bury	38	15	8	15	53	57	0.930	38	
12	Hull City	38	15	6	17	60	56	1.071	36	
13	Bradford (Park Avenue)	38	14	8	16	60	60	1.000	36	
14	Clapton Orient	38	10	14	14	34	47	0.723	34	
15	Leicester Fosse	38	13	7	18	50	65	0.769	33	
16	Bristol City	38	9	15	14	46	72	0.639	33	
17	Nottingham Forest	38	12	8	18	58	59	0.983	32	
18	Glossop	38	12	8	18	49	68	0.721	32	
19	Stockport County	38	8	10	20	56	78	0.718	26	Re-elected
20	Blackpool	38	9	8	21	39	69	0.565	26	Re-elected

(C) Champions; (P) Promoted
