= 1912–13 Football League =

25th season of the Football League

The Football League
- Season: 1912–13
- Champions: Sunderland
- New Club in League: Lincoln City

The 1912–13 season was the 25th season of The Football League, a league of professional association football clubs in England and Wales.

== Final league tables ==
Beginning in the 1894–95 season, clubs finishing level on points were separated according to goal average (goals scored divided by goals conceded). In case one or more teams had the same goal difference, this system favoured those teams who had scored fewer goals. The goal average system was eventually scrapped beginning with the 1976–77 season.

During the first six seasons of the league, (up to the 1893–94 season), re-election process concerned the clubs which finished in the bottom four of the league. From the 1894–95 season and until the 1920–21 season the re-election process was required of the clubs which finished in the bottom three of the league.

== First Division ==
First Division
- Season: 1912–13
- Champions: Sunderland; 5th English title
- Relegated: Notts County; Woolwich Arsenal
- Matches: 380
- Goals: 1,153 (3.03 per match)
- Top goalscorer: David McLean (30 goals)
- Biggest home win: Aston Villa 10–0 The Wednesday (5 October 1912)
- Biggest away win: Bradford City 0–5 Sunderland (2 November 1912)
- Highest scoring: Aston Villa 10–0 The Wednesday (5 October 1912)

Pos	Team	Pld	W	D	L	GF	GA	GAv	Pts	Relegation
1	Sunderland (C)	38	25	4	9	86	43	2.000	54	
2	Aston Villa	38	19	12	7	86	52	1.654	50	
3	The Wednesday	38	21	7	10	75	55	1.364	49	
4	Manchester United	38	19	8	11	69	43	1.605	46	
5	Blackburn Rovers	38	16	13	9	79	43	1.837	45	
6	Manchester City	38	18	8	12	53	37	1.432	44	
7	Derby County	38	17	8	13	69	66	1.045	42	
8	Bolton Wanderers	38	16	10	12	62	63	0.984	42	
9	Oldham Athletic	38	14	14	10	50	55	0.909	42	
10	West Bromwich Albion	38	13	12	13	57	50	1.140	38	
11	Everton	38	15	7	16	48	54	0.889	37	
12	Liverpool	38	16	5	17	61	71	0.859	37	
13	Bradford City	38	12	11	15	50	60	0.833	35	
14	Newcastle United	38	13	8	17	47	47	1.000	34	
15	Sheffield United	38	14	6	18	56	70	0.800	34	
16	Middlesbrough	38	11	10	17	55	69	0.797	32	
17	Tottenham Hotspur	38	12	6	20	45	72	0.625	30	
18	Chelsea	38	11	6	21	51	73	0.699	28	
19	Notts County (R)	38	7	9	22	28	56	0.500	23	Relegation to the Second Division
20	Woolwich Arsenal (R)	38	3	12	23	26	74	0.351	18	Relegation to the Second Division

Source: World Football
Rules for classification: 1) Points; 2) Goal average; 3) Goals scored
(C) Champions; (R) Relegated

=== Results ===
Home \ Away	AST	BLB	BOL	BRA	CHE	DER	EVE	LIV	MCI	MUN	MID	NEW	NTC	OLD	SHU	SUN	TOT	WED	WBA	WOO
Aston Villa		1–1	1–1	3–1	1–0	5–1	1–1	1–3	2–0	4–2	5–1	3–1	1–0	7–1	4–2	1–1	1–0	10–0	2–4	4–1
Blackburn Rovers	2–2		6–0	5–0	1–1	0–1	1–2	5–1	2–2	0–0	5–2	2–0	2–1	7–1	3–1	4–0	6–1	0–1	2–4	1–1
Bolton Wanderers	2–3	1–1		2–0	1–0	1–1	0–0	1–1	2–2	2–1	3–2	1–2	0–0	3–0	4–2	1–3	2–0	3–0	2–1	5–1
Bradford City	1–1	0–2	4–1		2–2	2–3	4–1	2–0	2–1	1–0	1–2	2–0	1–0	0–0	3–1	1–5	3–1	0–0	1–1	3–1
Chelsea	1–2	1–6	2–3	0–3		3–1	1–3	1–2	2–1	1–4	2–3	1–0	5–2	1–1	4–2	2–0	1–0	0–4	0–2	1–1
Derby County	0–1	1–1	3–3	4–0	3–1		1–4	4–2	2–0	2–1	0–2	2–1	1–0	1–2	5–1	0–3	5–0	1–4	1–2	4–1
Everton	0–1	2–1	2–3	2–1	1–0	2–2		0–2	0–0	4–1	1–0	0–6	4–0	2–3	0–1	0–4	1–2	3–1	1–3	3–0
Liverpool	2–0	4–1	5–0	2–1	1–2	2–1	0–2		1–2	0–2	4–2	2–1	0–0	2–0	2–2	2–5	4–1	2–1	2–1	3–0
Manchester City	1–0	3–1	2–0	1–3	2–0	1–1	1–0	4–1		0–2	3–0	0–1	4–0	2–0	3–0	1–0	2–2	2–2	2–1	0–1
Manchester United	4–0	1–1	2–1	2–0	4–2	4–0	2–0	3–1	0–1		2–3	3–0	2–1	0–0	4–0	1–3	2–0	2–0	1–1	2–0
Middlesbrough	1–1	0–0	4–0	1–1	0–3	4–1	0–0	3–4	0–0	3–2		0–0	1–1	2–2	4–1	0–2	1–1	0–2	3–1	2–0
Newcastle United	2–3	0–1	2–1	1–1	3–2	2–4	2–0	0–0	0–1	1–3	3–1		0–0	4–1	1–2	1–1	3–0	1–0	1–1	3–1
Notts County	1–1	3–1	1–0	1–1	0–0	0–1	0–1	3–0	0–1	1–2	1–3	0–1		2–1	0–1	2–1	0–1	1–2	1–1	2–1
Oldham Athletic	2–2	0–0	2–3	0–0	3–2	2–2	2–0	3–1	2–1	0–0	1–0	1–0	4–0		2–0	3–0	4–1	2–0	0–0	0–0
Sheffield United	3–2	0–0	0–2	3–2	3–3	4–1	4–1	4–1	1–1	2–1	1–0	1–1	2–0	1–1		1–3	4–0	0–2	1–0	1–3
Sunderland	3–1	2–4	2–1	1–0	4–0	0–2	3–1	7–0	1–0	3–1	4–0	2–0	4–0	1–1	1–0		2–2	0–2	3–1	4–1
Tottenham Hotspur	3–3	0–1	0–1	2–1	1–0	1–2	0–2	1–0	4–0	1–1	5–3	1–0	0–3	1–0	1–0	1–2		2–4	3–1	1–1
The Wednesday	1–1	2–1	2–2	6–0	3–2	3–3	1–2	1–0	1–0	3–3	3–1	1–2	3–1	5–0	1–0	1–2	2–1		3–2	2–0
West Bromwich Albion	2–2	1–1	2–2	1–1	0–1	0–0	0–0	3–1	0–2	1–2	2–0	1–0	2–0	2–3	3–1	3–1	4–1	1–1		2–1
Woolwich Arsenal	0–3	0–1	1–2	1–1	0–1	1–2	0–0	1–1	0–4	0–0	1–1	1–1	0–0	0–0	1–3	1–3	0–3	2–5	1–0	

Updated to match(es) played on unknown. Source:
Legend: Blue = home team win; Yellow = draw; Red = away team win.

=== Maps ===
Locations of the Football League First Division London teams
Locations of the Football League First Division teams

== Second Division ==
Football League Second Division
- Season: 1912–13
- Champions: Preston North End (2nd title)
- Failed re-election: (none)
- Matches: 380
- Goals: 1,123 (2.96 per match)
- Top goalscorer: Bert Freeman (Burnley), 31
- Biggest home win: Fulham – Stockport County 7–0 (8 Mar 1913)
- Biggest away win: Bristol City – Bury 1–5 (26 Apr 1913)
- Highest scoring: Bristol City – Stockport County 7–2 (18 Jan 1913)

Pos	Team	Pld	W	D	L	GF	GA	GAv	Pts	Promotion
1	Preston North End (C, P)	38	19	15	4	56	33	1.697	53	Promotion to the First Division
2	Burnley (P)	38	21	8	9	88	53	1.660	50	Promotion to the First Division
3	Birmingham	38	18	10	10	59	44	1.341	46	
4	Barnsley	38	19	7	12	57	47	1.213	45	
5	Huddersfield Town	38	17	9	12	66	40	1.650	43	
6	Leeds City	38	15	10	13	70	64	1.094	40	
7	Grimsby Town	38	15	10	13	51	50	1.020	40	
8	Lincoln City	38	15	10	13	50	52	0.962	40	
9	Fulham	38	17	5	16	65	55	1.182	39	
10	Wolverhampton Wanderers	38	14	10	14	56	54	1.037	38	
11	Bury	38	15	8	15	53	57	0.930	38	
12	Hull City	38	15	6	17	60	55	1.091	36	
13	Bradford (Park Avenue)	38	14	8	16	60	60	1.000	36	
14	Clapton Orient	38	10	14	14	34	47	0.723	34	
15	Leicester Fosse	38	13	7	18	49	65	0.754	33	
16	Bristol City	38	9	15	14	46	72	0.639	33	
17	Nottingham Forest	38	12	8	18	58	59	0.983	32	
18	Glossop	38	12	8	18	49	68	0.721	32	
19	Stockport County	38	8	10	20	56	78	0.718	26	Re-elected
20	Blackpool	38	9	8	21	39	69	0.565	26	Re-elected

(C) Champions; (P) Promoted

=== Maps ===
Locations of the Football League Second Division London teams
Locations of the Football League Second Division teams

== Attendances ==
Everton FC drew the highest average home attendance in the first edition of the Football League.

#	Football club	Home games	Average attendance
1	Chelsea FC	19	32,105
2	Newcastle United	19	25,211
3	Tottenham Hotspur	19	24,304
4	Aston Villa	19	23,939
5	Manchester City	19	22,947
6	Manchester United	19	22,680
7	Liverpool FC	19	21,601
8	Bolton Wanderers	19	20,164
9	The Wednesday FC	19	18,863
10	Everton FC	19	18,211
11	Blackburn Rovers	19	18,053
12	Sunderland AFC	19	17,711
13	Sheffield United	19	16,705
14	West Bromwich Albion	19	16,011
15	Bradford City	19	15,263
16	Middlesbrough FC	19	12,536
17	Notts County	19	12,053
18	Derby County	19	10,737
19	Oldham Athletic	19	10,289
20	Woolwich Arsenal	19	9,053

== See also ==
- 1912-13 in English football
- 1912 in association football
- 1913 in association football
