= Deaths in August 1979 =

The following is a list of notable deaths in August 1979. Entries for each day are listed alphabetically by surname. A typical entry lists information in the following sequence:

- Name, age, country of citizenship at birth, subsequent country of citizenship (if applicable), reason for notability, cause of death (if known), and reference.

== August 1979 ==
=== 1 ===
- Szymon Biliński, 80, Polish Protestant activist.
- Wayne Brenkert, 81, American football player and coach.
- Philip Mallory Conley, 91, American historian.
- Edward Fitzherbert, 93, British general and cricketer.
- Vlasta Javořická, 89, Czech novelist.
- Camillo Jerusalem, 65, Austrian footballer.
- Li Ji, 83, Chinese-Taiwanese archaeologist.
- Mary Cordell Nesbitt, 67, American politician, member of the North Carolina House of Representatives (since 1975).
- Gaspare Pasta, 85, Italian Olympic athlete (1924).
- Sarmento Rodrigues, 80, Portuguese colonial administrator.
- Ethelbert Stauffer, 77, German theologian.
- Eugene E. Stokowski, 58, American politician, member of the Minnesota House of Representatives
- Frans van Buchem, 81, Dutch physician.

=== 2 ===
- Princess Adelaide of Savoy-Genoa, 75, Italian royal.
- Ray Allen, 70, New Zealand cricketer.
- Gérard de Piolenc, 70, French Olympic sailor (1936).
- Karan Dewan, 61, Indian actor.
- Willie Goggin, 73, American golfer.
- Bob Griffin, 84, American racing executive.
- Víctor Raúl Haya de la Torre, 84, Peruvian politician, lung cancer.
- John Leydon, 84, Irish civil servant and transportation official.
- Thurman Munson, 32, American baseball player, plane crash.
- Stan Risdon, 65, English cricketer.
- Robert Schaffner, 74, Luxembourgish politician.
- Jack Tizard, 60, New Zealand psychologist.

=== 3 ===
- Edward Craig, 82, American politician, member of the California State Assembly (1929–1937).
- Juan Ibacache, 76, Chilean footballer.
- A. Quincy Jones, 66, American architect, heart attack.
- Bertil Ohlin, 80, Swedish economist and politician, Nobel Prize laureate (1977).
- Alfredo Ottaviani, 88, Italian Roman Catholic cardinal.
- Walter Porter, 75, British Olympic runner (1924).
- Enrico Sala, 88, Italian racing cyclist.
- Angelos Terzakis, 72, Greek writer.

=== 4 ===
- Camberley Kate, 84, English prolific dog owner.
- Reynold C. Fuson, 84, American chemist.
- Allison Greenlees, 82, Scottish scouting leader.
- Lew Hook, 74, New Zealand rugby player.
- J. Warren Hutchens, 69, American Episcopalian prelate.
- Matt Jenkinson, 72, English footballer.
- Ivar Johansson, 76, Swedish Olympic wrestler (1928, 1932, 1936).
- Roger Lambrecht, 63, Belgian racing cyclist.
- Albert Schreiner, 86, German politician and historian.
- Frank Vacca, 64, American politician, member of the Pennsylvania House of Representatives (1973–1974).
- Hal Wagner, 64, American baseball player.
- Cy White, 63–64, Canadian curler.

=== 5 ===
- Christine Böhm, 25, Austrian actress, hiking accident.
- Väinö Nieminen, 81, Finnish politician.
- Jacob Potofsky, 84, Russian-born American trade unionist, cancer.
- Mikhail Rudakov, 73, Soviet general.
- Charles Simons, 72, Belgian footballer.

=== 6 ===
- Olav Hordvik, 77, Norwegian politician.
- Tommy Jenkins, 77, Australian footballer.
- Kurt Kasznar, 65, Austrian-American actor (Land of the Giants), cancer.
- Émile Kleber, 80, French Olympic bobsledder (1936).
- Arthur Lacey, 75, English golfer.
- Feodor Lynen, 68, German biochemist, Nobel Prize laureate (1964), complications from surgery.
- James Ward Rector, 76, American jurist.
- Keith Storey, 74, Australian footballer.

=== 7 ===
- Bill Brennan, 57, American politician, member of the Nebraska Legislature (since 1977), complications from surgery.
- Valentin Filatov, 58, Soviet animal trainer and circus performer.
- Gordon T. Gould, 63, American general, heart attack.
- Hazel Keener, 74, American actress.
- Adolph Kummernuss, 84, German trade unionist.
- Margery Maude, 90, English actress.
- S. A. Natarajan, 61, Indian actor.
- Eamon Ryan, 32, Irish civil servant, shot.
- Frederick Seabrook, 80, English cricketer.

=== 8 ===
- Ghanim Abdul-Jalil, 41, Iraqi politician, execution by firing squad.
- George B. Barnes, 74, American politician, member of the Maine House of Representatives (1943–1947).
- Lionel Cooper, 63, South African mathematician.
- Charles Faithfull, 76, English rugby player.
- Liu Heng-ching, 79, Taiwanese politician.
- Muhyi Abdul-Hussein Mashhadi, 44, Iraqi politician, execution by firing squad.
- David J. McDonald, 76, American trade unionist.
- Robert Moline, 89, British Anglican prelate.
- Nicholas Monsarrat, 69, British novelist (The Cruel Sea), cancer.
- Fahir Özgüden, 45–46, Turkish Olympic hurdler (1960).
- George Rider, 88, American football and track and field coach.
- Thomas G. Rose, 78, English cricketer.

=== 9 ===
- Chus Alonso, 62, Spanish footballer
- Muhammad Amin, 47–48, Pakistani footballer.
- Alan Arthur, 73, Australian footballer.
- Marta Damkowski, 68, German politician and World War II resistance member.
- Jose Fornier, 65, Filipino politician.
- Walter O'Malley, 75, American baseball executive, heart failure.
- Charles Spinasse, 85, French politician.
- Witold Taszycki, 81, Polish linguist.
- Raymond Washington, 25, American gang leader, founder of the Crips, shot.
- Ben Zuckerman, 89, Romanian-born American fashion designer.

=== 10 ===
- Brenda Bell, 87, New Zealand radio broadcaster and politician.
- James B. Carey, 74, American jurist.
- Dick Foran, 69, American actor, pneumonia.
- Walther Gerlach, 90, German physicist.
- David Horowitz, 80, Austrian-born Israeli economist.
- Ángel León Gozalo, 71, Spanish Olympic sport shooter (1948, 1952, 1960).
- Régis Lepreux, 66, French Olympic weightlifter (1936).
- Joseph O'Doherty, 87, Irish politician, TD (1918–1927, 1933–1937).
- Fred Paxford, 81, British gardener.
- José María Pinilla Fábrega, 59, Panamanian politician, president (1968–1969), heart attack.
- Arthur F. Raper, 79, American sociologist, heart attack.
- Géza Wertheim, 69, Luxembourgish tennis player and Olympic bobsledder (1936).
- Curtis Williams, 44, American singer (The Penguins) and songwriter ("Earth Angel").
- John Wright, 70, American Roman Catholic cardinal, polymyositis.

=== 11 ===
- J. G. Farrell, 44, British novelist (Troubles), drowned.
- Georges Florovsky, 85, Russian-American theologian and priest.
- Reino Hallamaa, 79, Finnish soldier and radio operator.
- Don Harris, 74, Australian footballer.
- Douglas Haskell, 80, American writer and architecture critic.
- Carl Georg Heise, 89, German art historian.
- Antonina Makarova, 59, Soviet war criminal, mass murderer and Nazi collaborator, execution by firing squad.
- Robert Martinson, 52, American sociologist, suicide by jumping.
- Giacinto Mondaini, 76, Italian artist and screenwriter, cardiac arrest.
- Harry Wilson, 83, New Zealand Olympic hurdler (1920).
- Notable victims of the 1979 Dniprodzerzhynsk mid-air collision:
  - Mikhail An, 27, Soviet footballer
  - Olimjon Ashirov, 24, Soviet footballer
  - Vladimir Fyodorov, 23, Soviet footballer
  - Nikolai Borisovich Kulikov, 26, Soviet footballer
  - Vladimir Makarov, 32, Soviet footballer

=== 12 ===
- Gilbert Cesbron, 66, French novelist.
- Sir Ernst Chain, 73, German-born British biochemist, Nobel Prize laureate (1945).
- Angelo De Martini, 82, Italian Olympic racing cyclist (1924).
- Galinka Ehrenfest, 69, Russian-born Dutch writer and illustrator.
- Wallace J. S. Johnson, 66, American politician, stroke.
- Inger Juel, 52, Swedish actress.
- A. V. Meiyappan, 72, Indian filmmaker.
- Joseph Serebriany, 72, Soviet painter.
- Ted Tomkins, 58, Australian footballer.

=== 13 ===
- John Bunn, 80, American basketball coach.
- Andrew Dasburg, 92, American painter.
- Stan Dixon, 85, English footballer.
- Dorothy Edwards, 62, Welsh actress.
- Frank Glick, 85, American football player and coach.
- Benjaminas Jakševičius, 84, Lithuanian sculptor.
- Louis Macloon, 86, American theatre producer.
- Johanna Martzy, 54, Romanian-born Hungarian violinist.
- Rina Natan, 55, German-born Israeli transgender woman, country's first known transgender woman.
- Wilhelm Oxenius, 66, German soldier and translator.
- Tom Pollitt, 79, English cricketer.
- Reginald Somerville, 60, English cricketer.
- F. J. Thwaites, 71, Australian novelist, cancer.

=== 14 ===
- Georges Berthet, 75, French Olympic skier (1924).
- Paul Blenck, 83, French racing cyclist.
- Babe Frump, 78, American football player.
- Édouard Goubert, 85, Indian politician.
- Fred Jent, 84–85, Swiss writer.
- George Malley, 76, American football coach.
- Mikhail Ogonkov, 47, Soviet footballer.
- N. M. Perera, 75, Sri Lankan politician.
- Yehoshua Rabinovitz, 67, Russian-Israeli politician, MK (since 1977), heart attack.
- Gwenn Story, 19, American unsolved murder victim, stabbed.
- George Townsend Turner, 73, American philatelist.
- Wang Yun-wu, 91, Chinese-Taiwanese politician and scholar, vice premier (1947–1948, 1958–1963).
- Mack Wheat, 86, American baseball player.

=== 15 ===
- Claude Achurch, 82, Australian cricketer.
- Walter Berndt, 79, American cartoonist (Smitty).
- Zygmunt Witymir Bieńkowski, 66, Polish writer and pilot.
- Paul Bouque, 83, Cameroonian Roman Catholic prelate.
- Bill Grieve, 79, American baseball umpire, cancer.
- Jeanette Hackett, 81, American dancer and choreographer.
- Asa Martin, 79, American musician, heart attack.
- Derek Twist, 74, English filmmaker.

=== 16 ===
- Wally Annables, 67, English footballer.
- Georg Dahl, 73, Swedish ichthyologist.
- John Diefenbaker, 83, Canadian politician, prime minister (1957–1963), heart attack.
- Forrest Douds, 74, American football player and coach.
- F. Ryan Duffy, 91, American jurist and politician, member of the U.S. Senate (1933–1939).
- Jerzy Jurandot, 68, Polish poet and playwright.
- Sir Otto Kahn-Freund, 78, German-British legal scholar.
- Pedro Ludovico, 87, Brazilian politician.
- Lina Merlin, 91, Italian politician.
- Walter Schultze, 85, German politician, physician and Nazi official.
- Roy Williams, 71, Australian footballer.
- Larry Wilson, 48, Canadian ice hockey player and coach, heart attack.

=== 17 ===
- John C. Allen, 72, American roller coaster designer.
- Percy Wragg Brian, 68, British botanist.
- Gordon Fallows, 66, British Anglican prelate.
- Domingo Massagué, 78, Spanish footballer.
- Don Louis Perceval, 71, British artist and illustrator.
- Alf Ross, 80, Danish jurist and legal scholar.
- Vivian Vance, 70, American actress (I Love Lucy), breast cancer.

=== 18 ===
- Irving J. Barron, 88, American football and basketball coach.
- Mahmoud Ezidi, 34–35, Iraqi Kurdish militant, assassinated.
- Hans Gaffron, 77, German chemist.
- Draper Kauffman, 68, American naval admiral.
- William C. Krumbein, 77, American geologist, heart attack.
- Kenneth Lamott, 56, American writer.
- Ivan Marinov, 83, Bulgarian general and politician.
- Vasantrao Naik, 66, Indian politician.
- Kazys Škirpa, 84, Lithuanian diplomat.

=== 19 ===
- James Adams, 71, English footballer.
- Friedrich Wilhelm Bautz, 72, German theologian.
- Lourdinha Bittencourt, 55, Brazilian actress and singer, stroke.
- Dorsey Burnette, 46, American rockabilly musician, heart attack.
- D. Leo Daley, 84, American football player and coach.
- Hermann Flörke, 85, German general.
- Walter Gilbert, 64, American football player.
- Theo Heimann, 68, Swiss racing cyclist.
- Saad Jumaa, 63, Jordanian politician, prime minister (1967), heart disease.
- Aaro Kauppi, 76, Finnish politician and jurist.
- Mary Millington, 33, English model and pornographic actress, suicide by drug overdose.
- Anna Senjuschenko, 17, Australian footballer, traffic collision.
- Joel Teitelbaum, 92, Hungarian-American rabbi, heart attack.
- Vladimir Tretyakov, 25–26, Soviet convicted serial killer, execution by firing squad.

=== 20 ===
- Gérald Cottier, 48, Swiss Olympic basketball player (1952).
- Christian Dotremont, 56, Belgian painter and poet.
- Stan Fox, 73, English footballer.
- Alexander Atkinson Lawrence Jr., 72, American jurist.
- Eddie Lee, 80, American actor.
- Alfredo Llaguno-Canals, 76, Cuban Roman Catholic prelate.
- John Turnbull, 73, English Anglican prelate.

=== 21 ===
- Karl Bergmann, 72, German politician, MEP (1958–1970).
- Charlotte Blake, 94, American composer.
- Ray Brew, 76, Australian footballer.
- James Cook, 90, American football player.
- Efraín Díaz, 75, Chilean Olympic fencer (1928, 1936).
- Stuart Heisler, 82, American film and television director.
- Hienadz Kliauko, 47, Soviet Belarusian poet and translator.
- Giuseppe Meazza, 68, Italian football player and manager, pancreatic failure.
- Jack Milburn, 71, English football player and manager.
- Mpharanyana, 31, South African musician.
- Marcel Orfidan, 82, French Olympic long jumper (1920).
- Abraham Schalit, 80–81, Austrian-Israeli historian.

=== 22 ===
- Guillermo Angulo, 77, Puerto Rican baseball player.
- Henk Beernink, 69, Dutch politician.
- Julio de Diego, 79, Spanish-born American artist, cancer.
- James T. Farrell, 75, American novelist (Studs Lonigan), heart attack.
- Hanna Kiep, 75, German lawyer and diplomat.
- Aleksa Kovačević, 69, Yugoslav Olympic shot putter (1936).
- Joe Laws, 68, American football player.
- Richard Simonton, 64, American organist and entrepreneur, heart attack.
- Henry J. Tasca, 66, American diplomat, traffic collision.
- William A. Ulman, 71, American screenwriter and magazine editor.
- Leslie Waghorn, 73, English cricketer.

=== 23 ===
- Florence Atwater, 82, American author (Mr. Popper's Penguins).
- Harry W. Colmery, 88, American lawyer, heart attack.
- Richard Hearne, 71, English actor and comedian.
- Anna Maria Peduzzi, 67, Italian racing driver.
- Mohammad Saeed, 68, Pakistani cricketer.

=== 24 ===
- Ahmad Daouk, 87, Lebanese politician and diplomat, prime minister (1941–1942, 1960).
- Frank J. Donahue, 98, American politician.
- Bernt Evensen, 74, Norwegian Olympic speed skater (1928, 1932).
- William Felder Howell, 86, American politician, member of the Florida House of Representatives (1947–1948).
- Albert G. Lieske, 92, American politician, member of the Minnesota House of Representatives (1935–1938).
- Shigeharu Nakano, 77, Japanese politician and writer.
- Moe Reinblatt, 62, Canadian artist.
- Hanna Reitsch, 67, German aviator, heart attack.
- Fritz Riemann, 76, German psychologist.
- Sampson Sievers, 79, Soviet priest.

=== 25 ===
- Sōgen Asahina, 88, Japanese zen master and writer.
- Maria Bird, 88, South African-born British television producer.
- Karl Bodenschatz, 88, German general.
- Robert Carpenter, 70, American politician, member of the Ohio House of Representatives (1967–1970).
- Charles Clegg, 63, American historian and photographer, suicide by drug overdose.
- Ray Eberle, 60, American singer, heart attack.
- Stan Kenton, 67, American jazz pianist, complications from a stroke.
- George Morrissey Jr., 71, Australian footballer.
- Alberto Ruz Lhuillier, 73, Mexican archaeologist.
- Allan Turpin, 76, English novelist and playwright.
- Joe Wilson, 70, Australian rugby player.
- Mimie Wood, 90, New Zealand librarian and accountant.

=== 26 ===
- Mehdi Araghi, 48–49, Iranian militant, shot.
- Bruce Bennett, 61, American politician, Arkansas attorney general (1957–1961, 1963–1967).
- Ted Cremer, 77, Dutch Olympic rower (1924).
- Otto Buchanan Elliott, 92, Canadian politician, MP (1935–1940).
- Barksdale Hamlett, 70, American general, cardiac arrest.
- Cyril Holt, 62, Australian rugby player.
- Philip Inman, 1st Baron Inman, 87, British politician.
- Jeremiah Edmund Bowden Jennings, 66, South African engineer.
- Alvin Karpis, 72, Canadian-American convicted murderer and robber (Barker–Karpis Gang).
- Sam Lawrie, 44, Scottish footballer.
- Ben Oakland, 71, American composer, cancer.
- Harold Piggott, 85, Antiguan Anglican prelate.
- Leslie Savage, 82, British Olympic swimmer (1920, 1924).
- Dizzy Sutherland, 57, American baseball player.
- Mika Waltari, 70, Finnish author (The Egyptian).

=== 27 ===
- Elbert Halvor Ahlstrom, 69, American ichthyologist.
- Carles Buïgas, 81, Spanish architect.
- Wallace E. Conkling, 82, American Episcopalian prelate.
- Paul Coste-Floret, 68, French politician.
- Alfred C. Crowle, 89, Mexican football manager.
- Cleo Damianakes, 84, American etcher and illustrator.
- Charlotte Douglas, 84, Scottish obstetrician.
- Frederick Fett, 93, Australian cricketer.
- Otis Finley, 80–81, American football coach.
- Marie Bruner Haines, 93, American artist.
- Anna M. Kross, 88, Russian-born American politician.
- Norman Lewis, 70, American painter.
- Louis Mountbatten, Lord Mountbatten, 79, British naval admiral and royal, bomb explosion.
- Shi Jianqiao, 73, Chinese politician, assassin of Sun Chuanfang, colorectal cancer.
- Bolesław Szabelski, 82, Polish composer.

=== 28 ===
- Frank Bischof, 74, Australian police officer.
- Harry Ekman, 70, Swedish Olympic runner (1936).
- Paul Hardy, 68, American baseball player.
- W. G. Hardy, 84, Canadian ice hockey executive and educator.
- Jack Howard, 66, Australian rugby player.
- Doreen Knatchbull, Baroness Brabourne, 83, British socialite, injuries sustained in a bomb explosion.
- Gerard Nederhorst, 71, Dutch politician, MEP (1952–1965).
- Owen Pool, 75, American football player.
- Earl Pruess, 84, American baseball player.
- Walter Simon, 63, American artist, complications from kidney surgery.
- Konstantin Simonov, 63, Soviet author and poet.
- Princess Tatiana Constantinovna of Russia, 89, Russian royal.

=== 29 ===
- John Collinson, 67, English cricketer.
- Ivon Hitchens, 86, English painter.
- Mary Marquet, 84, Russian-French actress, heart attack.
- Nariman Marshall, 74, Indian cricketer.
- Samuel Irving Newhouse Sr., 84, American newspaper and broadcasting executive (Advance Publications), stroke.
- Kamala Nimbkar, 79, American-Indian therapist.
- Antonio Sicurezza, 74, Italian painter.
- Larry Strickland, 47, American football player.
- Masataka Taketsuru, 85, Japanese businessman and chemist.
- Charles Emerson Waters, 68, American politician, member of the Georgia Senate (1961–1963).

=== 30 ===
- Sir Edmund Anstice, 80, British naval admiral.
- Genevieve Foster, 86, American children's author.
- Archibald Fraser, 83, Australian politician.
- Anna Forbes Liddell, 87, American educator and suffragist.
- Otis R. Marston, 85, American historian and river rafter.
- Grace Perrier, 103, Australian librarian.
- Alexei Radzievsky, 68, Soviet general.
- Florika Remetier, 33, Romanian-American musician and feminist activist, drug overdose.
- Jean Seberg, 40, American actress (Breathless), suicide by drug overdose.
- Willi Titze, 89, German painter.
- Gertrude Chandler Warner, 89, American author (The Boxcar Children).
- C. E. Wynn-Williams, 76, Welsh physicist.

=== 31 ===
- John Allan, 82, New Zealand theologian.
- Bill Benton, 73, Australian footballer.
- Alexander Fraser, 20th Lord Saltoun, 93, Scottish hereditary peer.
- Alberto Martín-Artajo, 73, Spanish diplomat.
- Yoshio Mochinaga, 86, Japanese politician.
- Sally Rand, 75, American dancer and actress, heart failure.
- Henry Salkauskas, 54, Lithuanian-Australian artist.
- Tiger Smith, 93, English cricketer.
- Foad Mostafa Soltani, 30–31, Iranian Kurdish revolutionary, shot.
