= Solbé =

Solbé is a surname. Notable people with the surname include:

- Edward Solbé (1902–1961), English cricketer
- Frank Solbé (1871–1933), English hockey player

== See also ==
- Solbes, another surname
