= Kendra Boggess =

American academic administrator

12th President of Concord University
- In office April 22, 2014 – June 30, 2025
- Preceded by: Gregory F. Aloia
- Succeeded by: Bethany Meighen

Personal details
- Children: 3
- Education: St. Petersburg Junior College; University of Florida; Virginia Tech

Kendra Stahle Boggess is a former American academic administrator who served as the twelfth president of Concord University from 2014 to 2025.

== Life ==
Boggess earned an A.A. from St. Petersburg Junior College. She completed a B.S. in business education from the University of Florida. She received a M.S. (1988) in vocational technical education and a Ph.D. (1997) in business education from Virginia Tech. Her dissertation was titled, Ethical Issues in Business Communication: A Comparative Study of Perceptions among Japanese and US Students. B. June Schmidt was her doctoral advisor.

Boggess joined the faculty at Concord University in 1984 where she taught undergraduate business communications, software applications, and human resource management in the division of business. She served as the division chair from 1996 to 2009 and associate dean from 2009 to 2011. In August 2011, Boggess was promoted to interim vice president and academic dean. She served as the interim president for just over a year before being appointed as the twelfth president on April 22, 2014. She announced in July of 2024 that she would be retiring as the University's president after the 2024-2025 academic year. Boggess' term ended on June 30, 2025.

Boggess has three children.

== See also ==
- List of presidents and principals of Concord University
