= 1911 in association football =

The following are the football (soccer) events of the year 1911 throughout the world.

== Events ==
- Hajduk Split is founded.
- Olimpija Ljubljana founded.
- Zamalek Sporting Club (Cairo) founded.
- Valur founded.
- Brescia Calcio founded.
- FK Austria Wien founded.

== Winners club national championship ==
- Argentina: Alumni Athletic Club
- Belgium: Cercle Brugge
- England: Manchester United
- Germany: Viktoria 89 Berlin
- Hungary: Ferencváros
- Italy: Pro Vercelli
- Luxembourg: Sporting Club
- Netherlands: Sparta Rotterdam
- Paraguay: Club Nacional
- Scotland: For fuller coverage, see 1910-11 in Scottish football.
  - Scottish Division One – Rangers
  - Scottish Division Two – Dumbarton
  - Scottish Cup – Celtic
- Sweden: AIK
- Uruguay: C.U.R.C.C.
- Greece: Panellinios Podosfairikos Omilos Athens

== International tournaments ==
- 1911 British Home Championship (28 January – 3 April 1911)

England

- Sir Thomas Lipton Trophy:
  1. (England) West Auckland
  2. (Italy) Juventus
  3. (Italy) Torino
  4. (Switzerland) FC Zürich

== Births ==
- April 27 – Antonio Sastre, Argentine footballer (died 1987)
- May 14 – Leen Vente, Dutch footballer (died 1989)
- May 26 – Joaquim Serrano (died), Portuguese footballer
- July 9 – Svetislav Valjarević, Serbian Yugoslav international footballer (died 1996)
- August 10 – Leonidas Andrianopoulos, Greek footballer (died 2011)
- October 31 – Wally Annables, English former professional footballer (died 1979)
- November 3 – Kick Smit, Dutch footballer (died 1974)

== Deaths ==
- December 20 – William McGregor, Scottish football administrator, former FA and Aston Villa F.C. chairman, regarded as the founder of The Football League. (65)
