= 1911–12 Football League =

24th season of the Football League

The Football League
- Season: 1911–12
- Champions: Blackburn Rovers
- Relegated: Gainsborough Trinity
- New Team in League: Grimsby Town

The 1911–12 season was the 24th season of The Football League.

Blackburn Rovers won the First Division title for the first time.

Bury and Preston North End were relegated to the Second Division, and their places in the First Division were taken by Derby County and Chelsea.

== Final league tables ==
Beginning in the 1894–95 season, clubs finishing level on points were separated according to goal average (goals scored divided by goals conceded). In case one or more teams had the same goal difference, this system favoured those teams who had scored fewer goals. The goal average system was eventually scrapped beginning with the 1976–77 season.

During the first six seasons of the league, (up to the 1893–94 season), re-election process concerned the clubs which finished in the bottom four of the league. From the 1894–95 season and until the 1920–21 season the re-election process was required of the clubs which finished in the bottom three of the league.

== First Division ==
First Division
- Season: 1911–12
- Champions: Blackburn Rovers; 1st English title
- Relegated: Preston North End; Bury
- Matches: 380
- Goals: 1,057 (2.78 per match)
- Top goalscorer: David McLean; George Holley; Harry Hampton (25 goals each)
- Biggest home win: The Wednesday 8–0 Sunderland (26 December 1911)
- Biggest away win: Sheffield United 0–5 Bolton Wanderers (9 September 1911)
- Highest scoring: Sheffield United 7–3 Bradford City (4 March 1912)

| Pos | Team | Pld | W | D | L | GF | GA | GAv | Pts | Relegation |
|---|---|---|---|---|---|---|---|---|---|---|
| 1 | Blackburn Rovers (C) | 38 | 20 | 9 | 9 | 60 | 43 | 1.395 | 49 | |
| 2 | Everton | 38 | 20 | 6 | 12 | 46 | 42 | 1.095 | 46 | |
| 3 | Newcastle United | 38 | 18 | 8 | 12 | 64 | 50 | 1.280 | 44 | |
| 4 | Bolton Wanderers | 38 | 20 | 3 | 15 | 54 | 43 | 1.256 | 43 | |
| 5 | The Wednesday | 38 | 16 | 9 | 13 | 69 | 49 | 1.408 | 41 | |
| 6 | Aston Villa | 38 | 17 | 7 | 14 | 76 | 63 | 1.206 | 41 | |
| 7 | Middlesbrough | 38 | 16 | 8 | 14 | 56 | 45 | 1.244 | 40 | |
| 8 | Sunderland | 38 | 14 | 11 | 13 | 58 | 51 | 1.137 | 39 | |
| 9 | West Bromwich Albion | 38 | 15 | 9 | 14 | 43 | 47 | 0.915 | 39 | |
| 10 | Woolwich Arsenal | 38 | 15 | 8 | 15 | 55 | 59 | 0.932 | 38 | |
| 11 | Bradford City | 38 | 15 | 8 | 15 | 46 | 50 | 0.920 | 38 | |
| 12 | Tottenham Hotspur | 38 | 14 | 9 | 15 | 53 | 53 | 1.000 | 37 | |
| 13 | Manchester United | 38 | 13 | 11 | 14 | 45 | 60 | 0.750 | 37 | |
| 14 | Sheffield United | 38 | 13 | 10 | 15 | 63 | 56 | 1.125 | 36 | |
| 15 | Manchester City | 38 | 13 | 9 | 16 | 56 | 58 | 0.966 | 35 | |
| 16 | Notts County | 38 | 14 | 7 | 17 | 46 | 63 | 0.730 | 35 | |
| 17 | Liverpool | 38 | 12 | 10 | 16 | 49 | 55 | 0.891 | 34 | |
| 18 | Oldham Athletic | 38 | 12 | 10 | 16 | 46 | 54 | 0.852 | 34 | |
| 19 | Preston North End (R) | 38 | 13 | 7 | 18 | 40 | 57 | 0.702 | 33 | Relegation to the Second Division |
| 20 | Bury (R) | 38 | 6 | 9 | 23 | 32 | 59 | 0.542 | 21 | Relegation to the Second Division |

Source: World Football
Rules for classification: 1) Points; 2) Goal average; 3) Goals scored
(C) Champions; (R) Relegated

=== Results ===
| Home \ Away | AST | BLB | BOL | BRA | BRY | EVE | LIV | MCI | MUN | MID | NEW | NTC | OLD | PNE | SHU | SUN | TOT | WED | WBA | WOO |
|---|---|---|---|---|---|---|---|---|---|---|---|---|---|---|---|---|---|---|---|---|
| Aston Villa | | 0–3 | 0–1 | 0–0 | 5–2 | 3–0 | 5–0 | 3–1 | 6–0 | 2–1 | 2–0 | 5–1 | 6–1 | 1–0 | 1–0 | 1–3 | 2–2 | 2–3 | 0–3 | 4–1 |
| Blackburn Rovers | 3–1 | | 2–0 | 3–1 | 2–0 | 2–1 | 1–0 | 2–0 | 2–2 | 2–1 | 1–1 | 0–0 | 1–0 | 3–0 | 1–0 | 2–2 | 0–0 | 0–0 | 4–1 | 4–0 |
| Bolton Wanderers | 3–0 | 2–0 | | 2–0 | 1–0 | 1–2 | 2–1 | 2–1 | 1–1 | 1–0 | 0–2 | 3–0 | 2–1 | 3–0 | 0–3 | 3–0 | 1–0 | 4–2 | 2–0 | 2–2 |
| Bradford City | 2–1 | 1–0 | 1–0 | | 1–0 | 1–0 | 0–2 | 4–1 | 0–1 | 2–1 | 1–1 | 2–3 | 0–0 | 0–1 | 1–0 | 2–1 | 3–0 | 5–1 | 4–1 | 1–1 |
| Bury | 1–1 | 1–2 | 1–3 | 2–0 | | 1–2 | 2–2 | 1–2 | 0–1 | 0–2 | 2–1 | 0–1 | 1–1 | 0–0 | 3–1 | 0–2 | 2–1 | 2–2 | 1–0 | 3–1 |
| Everton | 1–1 | 1–3 | 1–0 | 1–0 | 1–1 | | 2–1 | 1–0 | 4–0 | 1–0 | 2–0 | 1–1 | 1–1 | 1–0 | 3–2 | 1–0 | 2–2 | 1–0 | 3–0 | 1–0 |
| Liverpool | 1–2 | 1–2 | 1–0 | 1–0 | 1–1 | 1–3 | | 2–2 | 3–2 | 1–1 | 0–1 | 3–0 | 1–0 | 0–1 | 2–0 | 2–1 | 1–2 | 1–1 | 1–3 | 4–1 |
| Manchester City | 2–6 | 3–0 | 3–1 | 4–0 | 2–0 | 4–0 | 2–3 | | 0–0 | 2–0 | 1–1 | 4–0 | 1–3 | 0–0 | 0–0 | 2–0 | 2–1 | 4–0 | 0–2 | 3–3 |
| Manchester United | 3–1 | 3–1 | 2–0 | 0–1 | 0–0 | 2–1 | 1–1 | 0–0 | | 3–4 | 0–2 | 2–0 | 3–1 | 0–0 | 1–0 | 2–2 | 1–2 | 3–1 | 1–2 | 2–0 |
| Middlesbrough | 1–2 | 2–1 | 1–0 | 1–0 | 1–1 | 0–0 | 3–2 | 3–1 | 3–0 | | 1–1 | 4–0 | 3–0 | 4–2 | 1–1 | 3–3 | 2–0 | 1–1 | 1–0 | 0–2 |
| Newcastle United | 6–2 | 4–2 | 5–2 | 0–2 | 3–2 | 2–0 | 1–1 | 1–0 | 2–3 | 0–1 | | 3–2 | 1–1 | 1–0 | 2–2 | 3–1 | 2–0 | 0–2 | 0–0 | 1–2 |
| Notts County | 2–0 | 1–3 | 3–2 | 0–0 | 2–0 | 0–1 | 0–0 | 0–1 | 0–1 | 2–1 | 1–4 | | 1–1 | 1–2 | 2–0 | 3–1 | 2–2 | 1–0 | 2–0 | 3–1 |
| Oldham Athletic | 1–2 | 0–1 | 3–1 | 3–0 | 2–0 | 3–0 | 0–1 | 4–1 | 2–2 | 2–0 | 2–4 | 1–2 | | 1–0 | 2–3 | 0–0 | 2–1 | 1–0 | 3–1 | 0–0 |
| Preston North End | 4–1 | 2–2 | 1–2 | 2–2 | 1–0 | 2–1 | 2–1 | 2–1 | 0–0 | 0–3 | 2–1 | 2–1 | 0–1 | | 3–0 | 0–3 | 0–1 | 2–3 | 1–1 | 0–1 |
| Sheffield United | 0–1 | 1–1 | 0–5 | 7–3 | 4–0 | 2–1 | 3–1 | 6–2 | 6–1 | 1–1 | 2–1 | 1–3 | 4–0 | 4–2 | | 1–2 | 1–2 | 1–1 | 1–1 | 2–1 |
| Sunderland | 2–2 | 3–0 | 0–1 | 1–1 | 1–0 | 4–0 | 1–2 | 1–1 | 5–0 | 1–0 | 1–2 | 5–0 | 4–2 | 3–0 | 0–0 | | 1–1 | 0–0 | 3–2 | 1–0 |
| Tottenham Hotspur | 2–1 | 0–2 | 1–0 | 2–3 | 2–1 | 0–1 | 2–0 | 0–2 | 1–1 | 2–1 | 1–2 | 2–2 | 4–0 | 6–2 | 1–1 | 0–0 | | 3–1 | 1–0 | 5–0 |
| The Wednesday | 3–0 | 1–1 | 0–1 | 4–2 | 2–1 | 1–3 | 2–2 | 3–0 | 3–0 | 0–2 | 1–2 | 3–0 | 1–0 | 0–1 | 1–1 | 8–0 | 4–0 | | 4–1 | 3–0 |
| West Bromwich Albion | 2–2 | 2–0 | 0–0 | 0–0 | 2–0 | 1–0 | 1–0 | 1–1 | 1–0 | 3–1 | 3–1 | 2–1 | 0–0 | 0–2 | 0–1 | 1–0 | 2–0 | 1–5 | | 1–1 |
| Woolwich Arsenal | 2–2 | 5–1 | 3–0 | 2–0 | 1–0 | 0–1 | 2–2 | 2–0 | 2–1 | 3–1 | 2–0 | 0–3 | 1–1 | 4–1 | 3–1 | 3–0 | 3–1 | 0–2 | 0–2 | |

Updated to match(es) played on unknown. Source:
Legend: Blue = home team win; Yellow = draw; Red = away team win.

=== Maps ===
Locations of the Football League First Division London teams
Locations of the Football League First Division teams

== Second Division ==
Football League Second Division
- Season: 1911–12
- Champions: Derby County (1st title)
- Failed re-election: Gainsborough Trinity
- Matches: 380
- Goals: 1,032 (2.72 per match)
- Top goalscorer: Bert Freeman (Burnley), 32
- Biggest home win: Wolverhampton Wanderers – Hull City 8–0 (4 Nov 1911)
- Biggest away win: Leeds City – Burnley 1–5 (9 Dec 1911); Birmingham – Derby County 0–4 (16 Sept 1911)
- Highest scoring: Fulham – Leeds City 7–2 (23 Mar 1912)

| Pos | Team | Pld | W | D | L | GF | GA | GAv | Pts | Promotion or relegation |
|---|---|---|---|---|---|---|---|---|---|---|
| 1 | Derby County (C, P) | 38 | 23 | 8 | 7 | 74 | 28 | 2.643 | 54 | Promotion to the First Division |
| 2 | Chelsea (P) | 38 | 24 | 6 | 8 | 64 | 34 | 1.882 | 54 | Promotion to the First Division |
| 3 | Burnley | 38 | 22 | 8 | 8 | 77 | 41 | 1.878 | 52 | |
| 4 | Clapton Orient | 38 | 21 | 3 | 14 | 61 | 44 | 1.386 | 45 | |
| 5 | Wolverhampton Wanderers | 38 | 16 | 10 | 12 | 57 | 33 | 1.727 | 42 | |
| 6 | Barnsley | 38 | 15 | 12 | 11 | 45 | 42 | 1.071 | 42 | |
| 7 | Hull City | 38 | 17 | 8 | 13 | 54 | 51 | 1.059 | 42 | |
| 8 | Fulham | 38 | 16 | 7 | 15 | 66 | 58 | 1.138 | 39 | |
| 9 | Grimsby Town | 38 | 15 | 9 | 14 | 48 | 55 | 0.873 | 39 | |
| 10 | Leicester Fosse | 38 | 15 | 7 | 16 | 49 | 66 | 0.742 | 37 | |
| 11 | Bradford (Park Avenue) | 38 | 13 | 9 | 16 | 44 | 45 | 0.978 | 35 | |
| 12 | Birmingham | 38 | 14 | 6 | 18 | 55 | 59 | 0.932 | 34 | |
| 13 | Bristol City | 38 | 14 | 6 | 18 | 41 | 60 | 0.683 | 34 | |
| 14 | Blackpool | 38 | 13 | 8 | 17 | 32 | 52 | 0.615 | 34 | |
| 15 | Nottingham Forest | 38 | 13 | 7 | 18 | 46 | 48 | 0.958 | 33 | |
| 16 | Stockport County | 38 | 11 | 11 | 16 | 47 | 54 | 0.870 | 33 | |
| 17 | Huddersfield Town | 38 | 13 | 6 | 19 | 50 | 64 | 0.781 | 32 | |
| 18 | Glossop | 38 | 8 | 12 | 18 | 42 | 56 | 0.750 | 28 | |
| 19 | Leeds City | 38 | 10 | 8 | 20 | 50 | 78 | 0.641 | 28 | Re-elected |
| 20 | Gainsborough Trinity (R) | 38 | 5 | 13 | 20 | 30 | 64 | 0.469 | 23 | Failed re-election and demoted |

(C) Champions; (P) Promoted; (R) Relegated

=== Results ===
| Home \ Away | BAR | BIR | BLP | BPA | BRI | BUR | CHE | CLA | DER | FUL | GAI | GLP | GRI | HUD | HUL | LEE | LEI | NOT | STP | WOL |
|---|---|---|---|---|---|---|---|---|---|---|---|---|---|---|---|---|---|---|---|---|
| Barnsley | | 1–0 | 1–0 | 1–0 | 4–1 | 1–1 | 0–2 | 2–1 | 0–2 | 2–2 | 4–0 | 1–0 | 2–2 | 0–0 | 1–2 | 3–4 | 0–0 | 1–0 | 2–1 | 2–1 |
| Birmingham | 1–3 | | 2–1 | 2–3 | 0–0 | 4–0 | 1–4 | 4–0 | 0–4 | 1–3 | 2–2 | 2–0 | 2–2 | 1–0 | 5–1 | 4–3 | 4–0 | 4–2 | 2–0 | 3–1 |
| Blackpool | 0–0 | 1–0 | | 0–4 | 1–0 | 0–0 | 1–0 | 1–0 | 1–0 | 3–1 | 0–0 | 2–0 | 1–2 | 3–1 | 3–2 | 3–0 | 1–1 | 2–0 | 0–1 | 1–0 |
| Bradford Park Avenue | 1–0 | 3–0 | 0–0 | | 0–1 | 2–1 | 1–1 | 2–1 | 0–1 | 0–2 | 5–0 | 1–1 | 4–1 | 3–1 | 3–1 | 1–1 | 1–1 | 2–1 | 1–0 | 0–2 |
| Bristol City | 0–1 | 2–1 | 2–0 | 1–0 | | 0–3 | 1–1 | 1–0 | 1–1 | 1–0 | 2–0 | 2–0 | 3–0 | 3–2 | 0–0 | 4–1 | 0–1 | 2–2 | 2–1 | 0–3 |
| Burnley | 3–0 | 1–1 | 1–1 | 3–1 | 4–2 | | 2–2 | 1–0 | 0–0 | 5–1 | 2–0 | 4–0 | 1–1 | 3–0 | 5–1 | 4–2 | 3–0 | 2–0 | 4–1 | 2–1 |
| Chelsea | 2–1 | 0–2 | 4–1 | 1–0 | 2–2 | 0–2 | | 3–0 | 1–0 | 1–0 | 1–0 | 1–0 | 4–1 | 3–1 | 1–0 | 4–2 | 2–1 | 2–0 | 0–0 | 4–0 |
| Clapton Orient | 2–0 | 2–0 | 2–0 | 2–0 | 4–0 | 1–2 | 1–4 | | 3–0 | 4–0 | 3–0 | 2–1 | 1–0 | 2–1 | 4–0 | 2–1 | 4–1 | 0–2 | 4–2 | 1–0 |
| Derby County | 0–0 | 0–1 | 5–1 | 1–0 | 3–0 | 2–0 | 2–0 | 5–1 | | 6–1 | 4–0 | 5–0 | 2–1 | 4–2 | 2–3 | 5–2 | 5–0 | 1–0 | 2–0 | 1–1 |
| Fulham | 2–2 | 2–1 | 3–0 | 2–0 | 2–1 | 3–4 | 0–1 | 0–2 | 0–0 | | 7–1 | 0–2 | 1–3 | 3–1 | 0–1 | 7–2 | 4–1 | 2–0 | 3–1 | 1–1 |
| Gainsborough Trinity | 1–2 | 0–0 | 0–0 | 0–0 | 2–3 | 1–0 | 0–2 | 0–2 | 1–1 | 0–1 | | 1–1 | 2–3 | 5–0 | 0–3 | 2–1 | 0–1 | 1–2 | 0–0 | 1–0 |
| Glossop | 0–2 | 2–0 | 1–1 | 0–0 | 3–0 | 1–3 | 1–2 | 3–3 | 3–1 | 1–1 | 1–1 | | 5–2 | 2–3 | 1–1 | 2–1 | 6–0 | 0–0 | 1–1 | 0–1 |
| Grimsby Town | 0–0 | 1–0 | 1–0 | 0–0 | 3–0 | 1–0 | 2–1 | 2–1 | 0–3 | 1–0 | 3–3 | 0–0 | | 1–2 | 1–0 | 1–2 | 4–0 | 1–4 | 2–2 | 0–0 |
| Huddersfield Town | 2–1 | 3–2 | 4–0 | 3–1 | 1–2 | 1–1 | 1–3 | 0–0 | 0–0 | 2–0 | 2–2 | 3–1 | 2–0 | | 0–2 | 1–2 | 1–2 | 1–2 | 2–0 | 1–1 |
| Hull City | 0–0 | 4–0 | 3–0 | 5–1 | 3–0 | 4–1 | 1–0 | 0–2 | 0–0 | 2–3 | 1–1 | 2–0 | 1–0 | 0–1 | | 1–0 | 4–1 | 2–1 | 0–2 | 3–0 |
| Leeds City | 3–2 | 0–0 | 1–0 | 1–2 | 3–1 | 1–5 | 0–0 | 0–2 | 0–1 | 0–2 | 0–0 | 2–1 | 1–2 | 2–0 | 0–0 | | 2–1 | 3–1 | 1–1 | 1–1 |
| Leicester Fosse | 0–0 | 5–2 | 4–0 | 3–0 | 2–0 | 3–2 | 2–0 | 2–0 | 0–1 | 2–5 | 2–0 | 1–0 | 0–2 | 0–2 | 3–0 | 2–1 | | 1–1 | 1–1 | 1–1 |
| Nottingham Forest | 0–2 | 0–1 | 2–1 | 2–1 | 2–0 | 0–1 | 2–3 | 3–0 | 1–3 | 1–1 | 2–0 | 0–1 | 1–0 | 3–0 | 0–0 | 2–1 | 4–1 | | 1–2 | 0–0 |
| Stockport County | 1–1 | 2–0 | 1–2 | 1–0 | 1–0 | 0–1 | 0–1 | 1–1 | 4–0 | 2–1 | 0–3 | 3–0 | 3–0 | 3–1 | 1–1 | 3–3 | 2–3 | 2–2 | | 1–2 |
| Wolverhampton Wanderers | 5–0 | 1–0 | 3–0 | 1–1 | 3–1 | 2–0 | 3–1 | 0–1 | 0–1 | 0–0 | 1–0 | 1–1 | 1–2 | 1–2 | 8–0 | 5–0 | 1–0 | 1–0 | 4–0 | |

Updated to match(es) played on unknown. Source: Ian Laschke: Rothmans Book of Football League Records 1888–89 to 1978–79. Macdonald and Jane’s, London & Sydney, 1980.
Legend: Blue = home team win; Yellow = draw; Red = away team win.

=== Maps ===
Locations of the Football League Second Division London teams
Locations of the Football League Second Division teams

== Attendances ==
=== Division One ===
| No. | Club | Average |
|---|---|---|
| 1 | Tottenham Hotspur FC | 25,030 |
| 2 | Newcastle United FC | 24,995 |
| 3 | Manchester City FC | 23,655 |
| 4 | Liverpool FC | 20,710 |
| 5 | Aston Villa FC | 20,480 |
| 6 | Bolton Wanderers FC | 19,135 |
| 7 | Manchester United | 19,040 |
| 8 | Everton FC | 18,870 |
| 9 | Blackburn Rovers FC | 17,765 |
| 10 | Bradford City AFC | 17,715 |
| 11 | West Bromwich Albion FC | 17,425 |
| 12 | The Wednesday | 14,410 |
| 13 | Sheffield United FC | 14,215 |
| 14 | Middlesbrough FC | 14,050 |
| 15 | Sunderland AFC | 12,555 |
| 16 | Oldham Athletic FC | 11,800 |
| 17 | Woolwich Arsenal | 11,630 |
| 18 | Notts County FC | 10,985 |
| 19 | Preston North End FC | 9,225 |
| 20 | Bury FC | 9,000 |

== See also ==
- 1911–12 in English football
- 1911 in association football
- 1912 in association football
