= Phil Conley (disambiguation) =

Philip Ransom Conley (1934–2014) is an American athlete.

Phil Conley may also refer to:

- Philip Mallory Conley (1887–1979), American historian
- Phillip Conley, musician in Digital Druglord
