= Charlotte Douglas =

Charlotte Douglas may refer to:

- Charlotte Douglas International Airport
- Charlotte Douglas (author), co-author of The Battle of Betazed
- Charlotte Douglas (physician) (1894–1979), Scottish physician and campaigner for improved maternity services in Scotland
- Charlotte Douglas (politician) (born 1952), member of the Arkansas House of Representatives
