= List of presidents and principals of Concord University =

President of Concord University
- Incumbent; Bethany Meighen since 2025
- Appointer: Concord University Board of Governors
- Formation: 1875 (principal); 1896 (president)
- First holder: James Harvey French (principal); Christopher Columbus Rossey (president)
- Website: President's Office

This list of presidents and principals of Concord University includes all who have served as principals or presidents of Concord University since its founding in 1872.

== Principals ==
=== As Concord State Normal School (1872–1931) ===
- James Harvey French, 1875–1891
- John D. Sweeney, 1891–1897
- George Michael Ford, 1897–1900
- Elmer F. Goodwin, 1900–1901
- Arthur S. Thorn, 1901–1906
- Frances Isabel Davenport, 1906–1907
- Charles L. Bemis, 1907–1913
- Lawrence Benjamin Hill, 1913–1918

== Presidents ==
=== As Concord State Normal School (1872–1931) ===
- Christopher Columbus Rossey, 1918–1924
- George West Diehl, 1924–1929
- Joseph Franklin Marsh Sr., 1929–1945

=== As Concord State Teachers College (1932–1943) ===
- Joseph Franklin Marsh Sr., 1929–1945

=== As Concord College (1943–2004) ===
- Joseph Franklin Marsh Sr., 1929–1945
- Virgil Harvey Stewart, 1945–1959
- Joseph Franklin Marsh Jr., 1959–1973
- Billy Lee Coffindaffer, 1973–1975
- James Walton Rowley, 1975–1976
- Meredith N. Freeman, 1976-1985
- Jerry L. Beasley, 1985–2008

=== As Concord University (2004-Present) ===
- Jerry L. Beasley, 1985-2008
- Gregory F. Aloia, 2008-2013
- Kendra Boggess, 2013–2025
- Bethany Meighen, 2025-Present
