= Achurch (surname) =

Achurch is a locational surname from Achurch in Northamptonshire, England. Notable people with the surname include:

- Claude Achurch (1896–1979), Australian cricketer
- James Achurch (1928–2015), Australian javelin thrower
- Janet Achurch (1863–1916), English actress and actor-manager
- Mitchell Achurch (born 1988), Australian rugby league player
