= Thomas G. Rose =

English cricketer

Thomas Rose
Personal information
- Full name: Thomas Ginnever Rose
- Born: 16 March 1901; Ilkeston, Derbyshire, England
- Died: 8 August 1979 (aged 78); St Ives, Cornwall, England
- Batting: Left-handed
- Bowling: Slow left arm orthodox

Domestic team information
- Years: Team
- 1922: Worcestershire
- FC debut: 24 May 1922 Worcestershire v Sussex
- Last FC: 4 July 1922 Worcestershire v Gloucestershire

Career statistics
Competition	First-class
Matches	6
Runs scored	47
Batting average	5.22
100s/50s	0/0
Top score	15
Balls bowled	327
Wickets	7
Bowling average	31.28
5 wickets in innings	0
10 wickets in match	0
Best bowling	3/68
Catches/stumpings	1/–
- Source: CricketArchive, 17 September 2007

Thomas Ginnever Rose (16 March 1901 – 8 August 1979) was an English first-class cricketer who played six matches, all for Worcestershire County Cricket Club in 1922.

Rose made his debut in an innings defeat against Sussex at Hove in late May 1922; he scored 4 and 15, and bowled five wicketless overs. His next match, against Kent at Gravesend, saw Worcestershire crushed by an innings and 236 runs. Rose himself, however, had a fairly successful game with the ball, claiming 3–68 in Kent's first innings; his victims were Bill Ashdown, Edward Solbé and Tich Freeman.

His next game, against Warwickshire at Amblecote, saw him take four wickets in the match, but in the three other games he played at first-class level Rose contributed absolutely nothing: he took no wickets and held no catches, while with the bat he made just 11 in four innings.
