= Solbes =

Solbes is a surname. Notable people with the surname include:

- Pedro Solbes (1942–2023), Spanish economist
- Ricardo Solbes (born 2006), Argentine footballer

== See also ==
- Solbé, another surname
