= Leslie Waghorn =

English cricketer

Personal information
- Full name: Leslie Arthur Waghorn
- Born: 29 July 1906; Robertsbridge, Sussex, England
- Died: 22 August 1979 (aged 73); Robertsbridge, Sussex, England
- Batting: Left-handed
- Bowling: Slow left-arm orthodox

Domestic team information
- Years: Team
- 1928: Marylebone Cricket Club
- 1926–1927: Sussex

Career statistics
Competition	First-class
Matches	5
Runs scored	14
Batting average	2.00
100s/50s	–/–
Top score	7
Balls bowled	492
Wickets	4
Bowling average	66.25
5 wickets in innings	–
10 wickets in match	–
Best bowling	2/34
Catches/stumpings	4/–
- Source: Cricinfo, 12 February 2012

Leslie Arthur Waghorn (29 July 1906 – 22 August 1979) was an English cricketer. Waghorn was a left-handed batsman who bowled slow left-arm orthodox. He was born at Robertsbridge, Sussex.

Waghorn made his first-class debut for Sussex against Nottinghamshire at Trent Bridge in the 1926 County Championship. He made three further first-class appearances for the county, the last of which came against the touring New Zealanders in 1927. In his four first-class matches for Sussex, Waghorn took 3 wickets at an average of 59.66, with best figures of 2/34. With the bat, he scored just 14 runs at a batting average of 2.33, with a high score of 7. In 1928, he made his final first-class appearance for the Marylebone Cricket Club against Derbyshire at Lord's. In Derbyshire's first-innings of 353, he went wicketless from his fourteen overs. In the Marylebone Cricket Club's first-innings of 355, Waghorn was dismissed for a duck by Leslie Townsend. He did take a sole wicket in Derbyshire's second-innings, that of Jim Hutchinson, while in the Marylebone Cricket Club's second-innings he wasn't required to bat, with the match ending in a victory by 7 wickets for the Marylebone Cricket Club.

He died at the village of his birth on 22 August 1979.
