= Joaquim Serrano =

Portuguese footballer

Personal information
- Full name: Joaquim Oliveira Serrano
- Date of birth: 26 May 1911
- Place of birth: Portugal
- Date of death: Unknown
- Position: Defender

Senior career*
Years	Team	Apps	(Gls)
1932–1939	Sporting CP		

International career
1934	Portugal	1	(0)
- * Club domestic league appearances and goals

Joaquim Oliveira Serrano (born 26 May 1911 - deceased) was a Portuguese footballer who played as a defender.

== See also ==
- Football in Portugal
- List of football clubs in Portugal
