= Stan Dixon =

English footballer

Personal information
- Full name: Edward Stanley Dixon
- Date of birth: 26 May 1894
- Place of birth: Easington, England
- Date of death: 13 August 1979 (aged 85)
- Place of death: Bedlington, England
- Height: 5 ft 10 in (1.78 m)
- Positions: Wing half; inside right

Senior career*
Years	Team	Apps	(Gls)
1912–1914	Barrington Albion		
1914–1923	Newcastle United	49	(7)
1923–1926	Blackburn Rovers	29	(1)
1926–1930	Hull City	99	(3)
1930–1931	East Riding Amateurs		
- Choppington Rovers
- * Club domestic league appearances and goals

Edward Stanley Dixon (26 May 1894 – 13 August 1979) was an English professional footballer who played in the Football League for Hull City, Newcastle United and Blackburn Rovers as a wing half or inside right.

== Personal life ==
In April 1915, with the First World War underway, Dixon enlisted in the Tyne Electrical Engineers. He had risen to the rank of acting corporal by July 1917 and spent the war on anti-aircraft duty in Britain. He finished the war with the rank of sergeant. After his retirement from football, Dixon managed a cinema in Hull.

== Career statistics ==
Appearances and goals by club, season and competition
Club	Season	League			FA Cup		Total	
Club	Season	Division	Apps	Goals	Apps	Goals	Apps	Goals
Newcastle United	1913–14	First Division	1	0	0	0	1	0
Newcastle United	1914–15	First Division	1	0	0	0	1	0
Newcastle United	1919–20	First Division	21	5	2	1	23	6
Newcastle United	1920–21	First Division	12	1	0	0	12	1
Newcastle United	1921–22	First Division	10	1	2	2	12	3
Newcastle United	1922–23	First Division	4	0	0	0	4	0
Newcastle United	Total		49	7	4	3	53	10
Blackburn Rovers	1922–23	First Division	11	0	0	0	11	0
Blackburn Rovers	1923–24	First Division	14	0	0	0	14	0
Blackburn Rovers	1924–25	First Division	1	0	0	0	1	0
Blackburn Rovers	1925–26	First Division	3	1	2	2	5	3
Blackburn Rovers	Total		29	1	2	2	31	3
Hull City	1926–27	Second Division	28	0	5	0	33	0
Hull City	1927–28	Second Division	39	0	1	0	40	0
Hull City	1928–29	Second Division	27	0	2	0	29	0
Hull City	1929–30	Second Division	5	0	0	0	5	0
Hull City	Total		99	0	8	0	107	0
Career total			177	8	14	5	191	13
