= Ted Tomkins =

Australian rules footballer

Personal information
- Full name: Edward Lockley Tomkins
- Born: 3 October 1920; Lilydale, Victoria
- Died: 12 August 1979 (aged 58)
- Original team: Kilsyth
- Height: 183 cm (6 ft 0 in)
- Weight: 82 kg (181 lb)

Playing career^{1}
Years	Club	Games (Goals)
1943	Fitzroy	1 (0)
- ^{1} Playing statistics correct to the end of 1943.

Edward Lockley Tomkins (3 October 1920 – 12 August 1979) was an Australian rules footballer who played with Fitzroy in the Victorian Football League (VFL).
