= Valentin Filatov (bear trainer) =

Valentin Filatov (Aug 12, 1920 – August 7, 1979) was a Soviet circus performer and animal trainer. His father ran a circus and he worked there from the age of six. He began training bears in 1944 and created the “Bear Circus” in 1949, a popular show that featured bears doing unusual tricks, including riding motorbikes. Filatov performed all over the world with the bears, was featured on the Ed Sullivan show, and was even commemorated on a Soviet postage stamp.
