= Paul Blenck =

French cyclist

Personal information
- Born: 5 October 1895
- Died: 14 August 1979 (aged 83)

Cycling career
- Sport: Cycling
- Role: Rider

Paul Blenck (5 October 1895 – 14 August 1979) was a French racing cyclist. He rode in the 1919 Tour de France.
