= Walter Simon (painter) =

American oil painter (1916–1979)

Walter Augustus Simon
- Born: Walter Augustus Simon; June 16, 1916; Brooklyn, New York, U.S.
- Died: August 28, 1979 (aged 63)
- Education: Pratt Institute National Academy of Design New York University (MD & Ph.D)
- Known for: Painting
- Notable work: 715 Washington St.
- Movement: Abstraction
- Spouse(s): Virginia Spottswood (m. 1942–1979)

Walter Augustus Simon Jr. (June 18, 1916 – August 28, 1979) was an American painter, teacher, foreign service officer, and cultural affairs officer. Having a career that spanned over five decades, Simon is best known for his abstract oil on canvas paintings, specifically 715 Washington St., which portrayed his apartment building in the Greenwich Village area of Manhattan that also acted as an artist salon.

== Biography ==
=== Early life ===
Simon was born in Brooklyn, New York in 1916 to an Indian father, Walter Simon Sr., and an African-American mother, Gay Crichton. He lived on Macon Street and cultivated his artistic talents from an early age. He won several prizes for his talents starting in elementary school. Beginning at age 11, he was being commissioned to paint portraits...

=== Education ===
Simon attended the Pratt Institute in Brooklyn until 1935 when he left to attend the National Academy of Fine Arts in Harlem until graduation in 1937. He went on to attend New York University but dropped out due to poor grades. He later used his G.I. bill to re-enter NYU after returning from war in 1945. He went on to get his B.A. degree in 1948 and his M.A. in Art History in 1950. He wrote a dissertation on the African-American painter Henry Ossawa Tanner to achieve his Ph.D. in 1961.

=== Military service ===
Simon joined the United States Army Corps of Engineers in 1940. Shortly after marrying his wife, Virginia Spottswood, in 1942, he left to join WWII. He traveled to Europe and Alaska for the war, returning in 1945.

Later in life, after eight years and three applications trying to get in, he became a foreign service officer, being among only 64 African-Americans serving in foreign countries for the United States Information Agency. He went on to serve as the Assistant Cultural Attache in Cairo alongside the United States Information Agency from 1961 to 1969 while the United Arab Republic was a functioning Government. While there, he organized concerts, exhibitions, film showcases, and conducted lectures. in 1963, he was also a cultural affairs officer in Kabul, Afghanistan, and Colombo, Sri Lanka (then Ceylon). He put on an exhibition of his own works with the little spare time he had. As an officer, he could not accept the money personally and donated all proceeds to the Abu Simbel Temple Restoration Fund.

=== Teaching career ===
After receiving the last of his multiple degrees in 1961, Simon taught art at Atlanta University, Georgia State College, Virginia State University, Patterson State College, later becoming a faculty member there, the California Institute of the Arts, Bloomsburg State College, and Virginia Union University.

=== Death ===
Simon died in 1979 following a kidney transplant operation. He left behind an incomplete autobiography manuscript.

== Personal life ==
Simon married Virginia Spottswood (b. 1920) in 1942. Spottswood was from Roxbury, Massachusetts, and the eldest of five children. Her parents were Viola Estelle (née Booker) and Stephen Gill Spottswood, an African American Episcopal Zion minister. The wedding ceremony was performed by Spottswood's father. Spottswood graduated from Dunbar High School in Washington, D.C., and attended Livingston College, her church's denominational institution. She earned her bachelor's degree in English in 1941. She completed her master's degree at Wellesley College where she met Simon. The two kept in touch while Simon enlisted in the Army and while Spottswood worked as a substitute teacher. After Simon's death, she wrote a book, unpublished, about Nubian culture and its kingdoms. She was the first African-American to serve on the Virginia Museum Fine Arts Council.

The couple had three children together, daughters Toni Spottswood Simon and Deborah Booker Simon, and son Michael Crichton Simon. The family lived together at 715 Washington Street in Greenwich Village, NY.

While studying at NYU, Simon was mentored by Hale Woodruff, a prominent African-American educator and painter.

Simon was Catholic.

== Major works ==
- 715 Washington Street, Greenwich Village, 1947, Oil on canvas, Museum of Fine Arts Boston

Simon lived at 715 Washington Street with his family. While there, he made the apartment an artist salon where artists would come and work shop together. There, they hosted many local artists together in their home and learned much of what they know from them. It was in the thriving artistic community as an NYU student that Simon honed his skills and transitioned from traditional figurative works to Abstraction.

The rather large and prominent apartment building was portrayed by Simon in the painting titled after the address. He used oil on canvas while also taking some sand from the local playground his children played on and put it in the corner of the painting.

- San Fernando Fault #R-2, 1971, acrylic on textured cardstock 580x292 mm; 12 7/8x11 1/2 inches. Signed in acrylic, lower right.
- Screenprint 1961–1965, edition 61/65, Untitled, signed lower right Dimensions: 30 x 38,5 cm.
- The Iron Eagle 1960, oil on canvas, circa 1960. 914x1016 mm; 36x40 inches. Signed in oil, lower right.
- City Abstraction 1948, oil on canvas, circa 1948. 760x510 mm; 30x20 inches. Initialed (indistinctly) in oil, lower right
- Second Avenue, New York City 1960, oil on thin cardstock, 1960. 387x507 mm; 15 1/4x20 inches. Signed in oil, lower right
- Frühling, 1952
- Landschaft, date unknown
- Blauer Hügel, date unknown
