= Marta Damkowski =

- Born: 16 March 1911; Stade, Province of Hanover, Prussia, German Empire
- Died: 9 August 1979 (aged 68); Hamburg, West Germany
- Occupations: resistance fighter, politician

Marta Damkowski (also Martha Damkowski, née Marta Bröker; 16 March 1911 – 9 August 1979) was a German resistance fighter against the Nazis and a Social Democratic politician.

== Life ==
From its foundation in 1923, Marta was a member of the Reichsarbeitsgemeinschaft der Kinderfreunde (RAG) ("National Association of Friends of Children"), which was connected with the Social Democratic Party of Germany (SPD). After completing a commercial apprenticeship, Marta joined the Socialist German Workers Youth (SDAJ) in 1927. In 1928 she joined the International Socialist Militant League (ISK). After the Nazi party came to power in 1933, Marta was active in the resistance work of the ISK in various places, until she was arrested in 1937. In 1938 she was sentenced in the People's Court to thirteen months in prison. She was released in 1940, and shortly afterwards married Herbert Damkowski (who had been sentenced to prison along with Marta in 1938). Herbert was later killed in battle in 1944, while part of a penal military unit.

In 1945 Marta joined the German Social Democratic Party (SPD). She acted as the female secretary of the SPD from 1946 to 1949. Between 1947 and 1953 Marta was elected to the Hamburg Parliament. She was also a civil servant, working for the department of Justice in Hamburg, and temporarily acting as governor of the women's prison in Hahnöfersand near Hamburg. Marta was politically engaged with the women's movement (especially regarding sexual education and the law on abortion) and other socio-political issues. She was active in the Arbeitsgemeinschaft sozialdemokratischer Frauen (Working Group of Social Democratic Women).

== Legacy ==
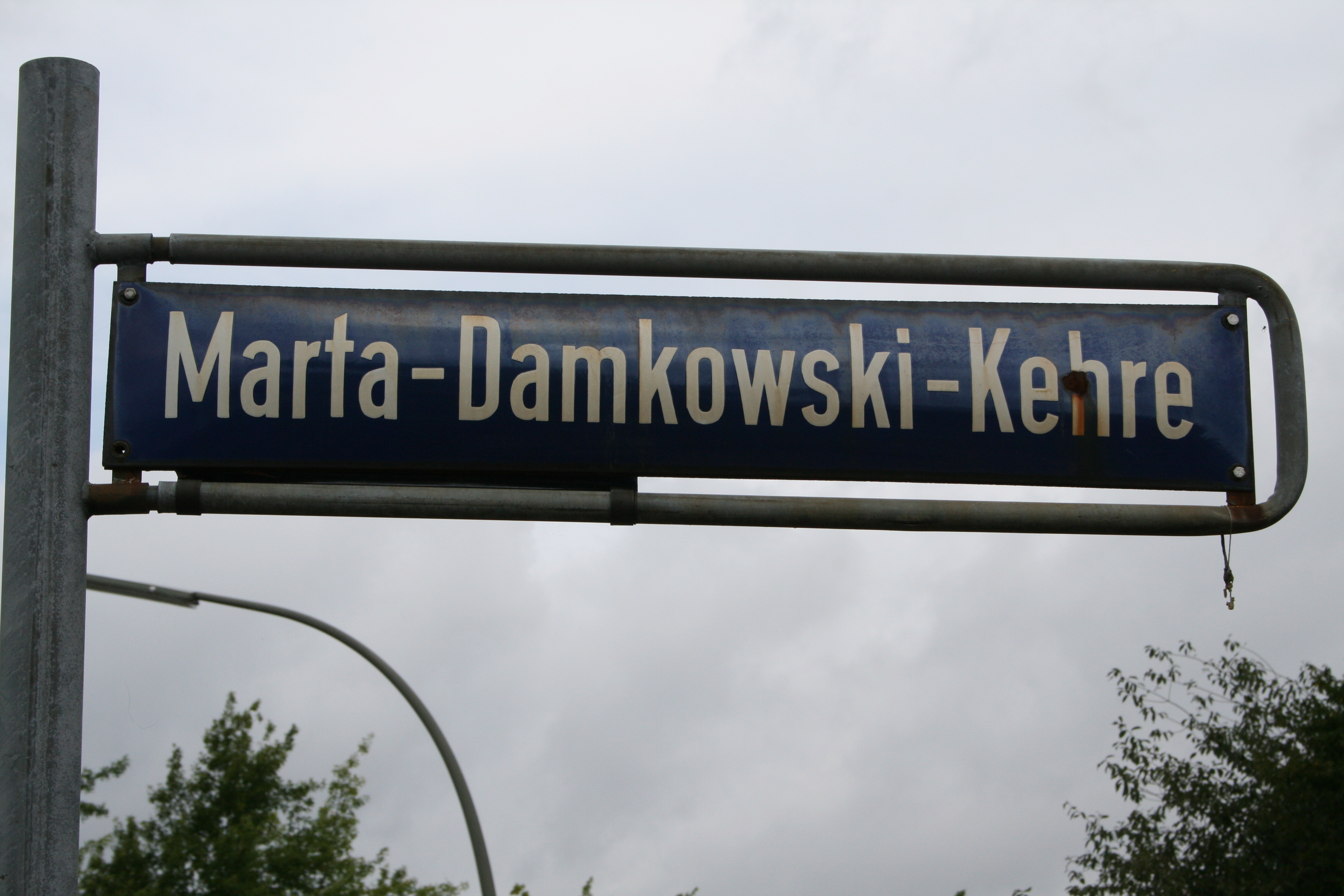

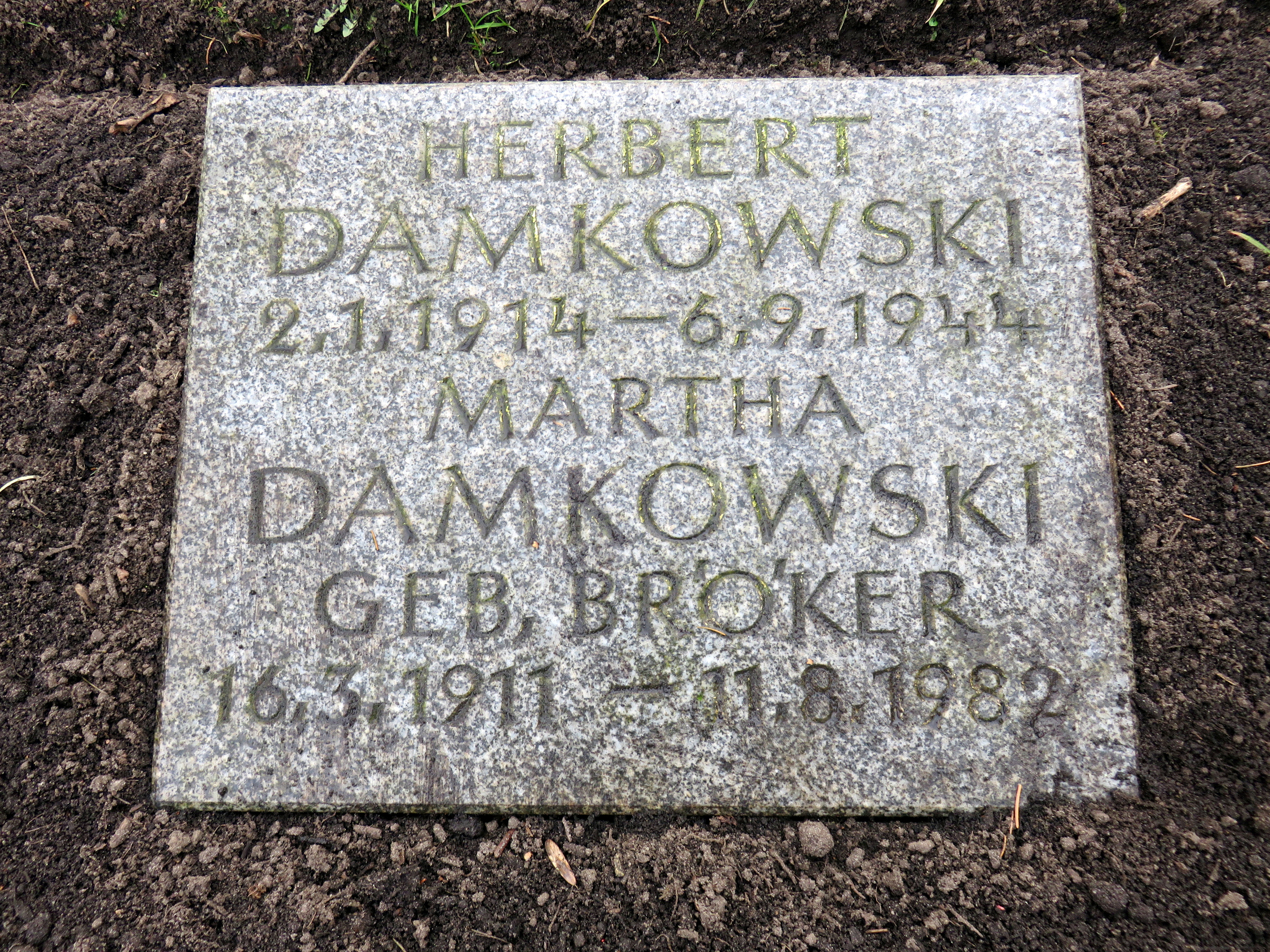
Memorial stone for Marta Damkowski

- In 1986 a street in Neuallermöhe in Hamburg was named after Marta Damkowski.
- In Ohlsdorf Cemetery in Hamburg, among the memorials for the victims and opponents of the Nazi regime, there is a memorial stone for Marta Damkowski and her husband, Herbert (grid reference Bn 73 No. 342).
