= Cyril Holt =

Australian rugby league footballer

Personal information
- Full name: Cyril Raymond Holt
- Born: 19 April 1917; Kogarah, New South Wales, Australia
- Died: 26 August 1979 (aged 62); Lithgow, New South Wales, Australia

Playing information
- Position: Centre
Club
| Years | Team | Pld | T | G | FG | P |
|---|---|---|---|---|---|---|
| 1937–38 | St. George | 21 | 5 | 36 | 0 | 87 |
| 1944–45 | St. George | 8 | 0 | 13 | 0 | 26 |
| | Total | 29 | 5 | 49 | 0 | 113 |
Representative
| Years | Team | Pld | T | G | FG | P |
| 1942 | NSW Country | 1 | 0 | 0 | 0 | 0 |

Cyril Holt (19 April 1917 – 26 August 1979) was an Australian rugby league footballer who played in the 1930s and 1940s.

== Playing career ==
"Sipper' Holt was a local St. George junior that reached first grade in 1937. Also, Holt was a very accurate goal kicker. After two seasons, Cyril Holt left Sydney to continue his career at the N.S.W. town of Lithgow for four years and was selected to play for Country Firsts in 1942. Holt was called up to the RAAF and when stationed in Sydney in 1944 & 1945, he returned to play with St George before retiring from first grade.

== Death ==
Holt died on 26 August 1979 at Lithgow, New South Wales aged 62.
