= Fritz Riemann (psychologist) =

German psychologist and astrologer

Fritz Riemann (September 15, 1902 in Chemnitz, Germany – August 24, 1979 in Munich, West Germany) was a German psychologist, psychoanalyst, astrologer, and author.

== Personal life ==
Fritz Riemann undertook three courses of analysis. His first teaching analyst was Therese Benedek, who had to resign as a Jew from the German Psychoanalytic Society in 1935 and emigrated to the United States in 1936. Riemann's second training analysis was with Felix Boehm and his third with Harald Schultz-Hencke.

In 1946 Fritz Riemann co-founded the Institute for psychological research and psychotherapy in Munich, renamed Academy of Psychoanalysis and Psychotherapy in 1974. At first he was the only training analyst at the Institute and for many years the only Freudian. From 1956 to 1967, he was training director.

Riemann is an honorary member of the Academy of Psychoanalysis New York.

== Professional life ==
=== Anxiety ===
In 1961 Riemann published a book called Grundformen der Angst [Basic Forms of Anxiety] in which he developed a typology of personality. He postulated that every person had two pairs of conflicting needs, each coming with their own form of fear or anxiety.

The first pair was the need to be an individual versus the need to be part of a group. The corresponding fears were fear of love and commitment and fear of loneliness and self-actualization. The second pair was the need for constancy versus the need for change. The corresponding fears were fear of insecurity and change, and fear of confinement and constancy.

Riemann stressed that everybody experienced all of these fears to varying extents. However, if one of the fears became so dominant within a person that it eclipsed the other fears, the person was mentally unhealthy. Each fear thereby came with its own type of disorder; when the fear of love was dominant, Riemann spoke of schizoid people; when it was the fear of loneliness, he spoke of depressed persons; fear of change corresponded with obsessive characteristics; and fear of constancy brought out "hysterical" personalities.

=== Astrology ===
Fritz Riemann turned to astrology in the 1930s while training to become a psychoanalyst, and published the book Lebenshilfe Astrologie. Gedanken und Erfahrungen [Life through astrology: Thoughts and experiences] in 1976, which he viewed as a contribution to the prejudice-free "rehabilitation" of the thought and symbolic language of astrology. He saw individual birth charts as fruitful for all human relationships, emphasizing personal responsibility for emotional development. Astrology, according to his statements, influenced his psychotherapeutic work.

== Publications ==
=== Psychology ===
- Anxiety. Using Depth Psychology to Find a Balance in Your Life (translated by Greta Dunn), Munich / Basel: Ernst Reinhardt 2008, ISBN 978-3-497-02043-0 (German edition Grundformen der Angst first published in 1961)
- Basic forms helfender partnership. Selected Essays (ed. and with an introd. of Karl Herbert Mandel), Munich: J. Pfeiffer 1974, currently: Stuttgart, Klett-Cotta, 9th edition 2004, ISBN 978-3-608-89622-0
- The art of aging (ed. by Siegfried Elhardt and Doris Zagermann), Stuttgart: Cross 1981, currently: Munich, Ernst Reinhardt, 4th edition 2007, ISBN 978-3-497-01955-7
- The ability to love, Munich: Ernst Reinhardt 2007, ISBN 978-3-497-01901-4

=== Astrology ===
- Lebenshilfe astrology. Thoughts and experiences, Munich: J. Pfeiffer 1976, currently: Munich, Deutscher Taschenbuch 2005, 20 Edition, ISBN 3-423-34262-5
- Ernst von Xylander: The cheerful horoscope. Astrological Verses, Zurich: Current 1955, currently: Berne, Origo, 4 REV. A. 1993, ISBN 978-3-282-00022-7
