= Reginald Somerville (cricketer) =

English cricketer

Personal information
- Full name: Reginald James Somerville
- Born: 9 October 1918; Camberwell, Surrey, England
- Died: 13 August 1979 (aged 60); Lambeth, London, England
- Batting: Right-handed

Career statistics
Competition	First-class
Matches	1
Runs scored	3
Batting average	3.00
100s/50s	–/–
Top score	3
Catches/stumpings	1/–
- Source: Cricinfo, 19 June 2019

Reginald James Somerville (9 October 1918 – 13 August 1979) was an English first-class cricketer.

Somerville served in the Second World War, enlisting in the South Staffordshire Regiment as second lieutenant in September 1941. He ended the war with the temporary rank of captain. Following the war, he became banker by profession. Somerville played a single first-class cricket match for D. R. Jardine's XI against Oxford University at Eastbourne in 1955. Batting once in the match, Somerville was dismissed for 3 runs by Jimmy Allan in the D. R. Jardine's XI first-innings. He died at Lambeth in August 1979.
