= Edward Solbé =

English cricketer

Edward Phillip Solbé (10 May 1902 – 29 December 1961) was an English cricketer.

Born in Bromley, Solbé was a prominent batsman at schoolboy level during World War I, and subsequently made fifteen appearances in first-class cricket for Kent County Cricket Club. Often coming in down the order, Solbé scored two half-centuries for Kent—the first against Sussex in 1921, with the second coming the following season against Worcestershire.

The son of Frank Solbé, who played international hockey for England, Edward died in Nottingham in 1961, aged 59.

== Bibliography ==
- Carlaw, Derek (2020). Kent County Cricketers, A to Z: Part Two (1919–1939) (PDF). Cardiff: ACS.
