= Willi Titze =

German painter

- Born: 19 February 1890; Hamburg, Germany
- Died: 30 August 1979 (aged 89); Hamburg, Germany
- Occupation: Painter

Willi Titze (19 February 1890 – 30 August 1979) was a German painter. His work was part of the painting event in the art competition at the 1936 Summer Olympics.
