= William Felder Howell =

American politician

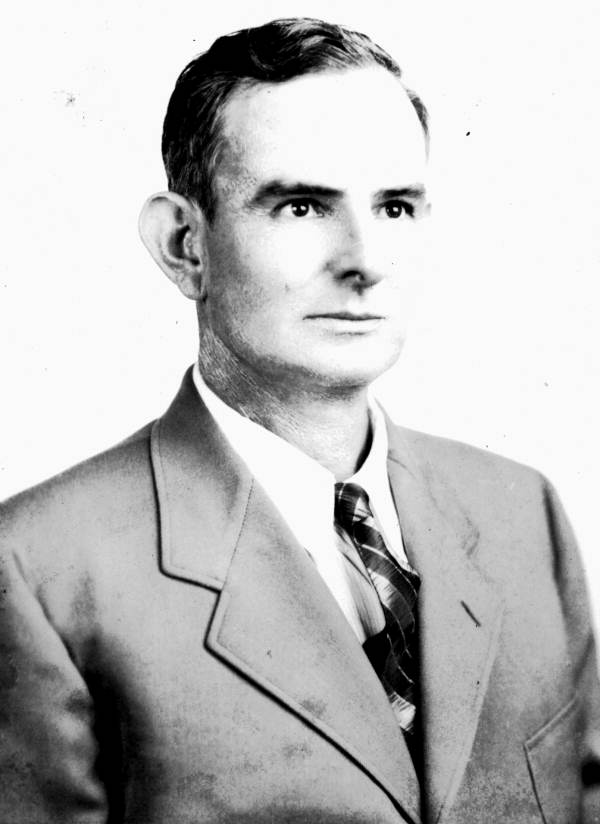
- Howell in 1947

Member of the Florida House of Representatives from Lafayette County
- In office 1947–1948

Personal details
- Born: February 23, 1893
- Died: August 24, 1979 (aged 86)
- Party: Democratic

William Felder Howell (February 23, 1893 – August 24, 1979) was an American politician, farmer and lumber-man. He served as a Democratic member of the Florida House of Representatives.
