= George Morrissey Jr. =

Australian rules footballer

George Morrissey

Personal information
- Full name: George Morrissey
- Born: 10 March 1908; Timor, Victoria
- Died: 25 August 1979 (aged 71); Heidelberg, Victoria
- Original team: Brunswick Juniors
- Height: 174 cm (5 ft 9 in)
- Weight: 76 kg (168 lb)

Playing career^{1}
Years	Club	Games (Goals)
1927–1928	North Melbourne	4 (0)
1931	Carlton	9 (2)
Total		13 (2)
- ^{1} Playing statistics correct to the end of 1931.

George Morrissey (10 March 1908 – 25 August 1979) was an Australian rules footballer who played with Carlton and North Melbourne in the Victorian Football League (VFL). His father, George, also played in the VFL for St Kilda.

Morrissey later served in the Royal Australian Air Force during World War II.
