= Otis Finley =

American football player and coach (1898–1979)

Biographical details
- Born: 1898; LaFayette, Alabama, U.S.
- Died: August 27, 1979 (aged 80–81); Maryland, U.S.

Playing career
- 1920–1921: Springfield

Coaching career (HC unless noted)
- 1924: Lincoln (MO)
- 1925–1926: Virginia State
- 1929–1930: Vashon HS (MO) (assistant)
- 1930–1944: Vashon HS (MO)
- 1945–1955: Washington Tech HS (MO)
- 1956–1963: Hadley Tech HS (MO)
- 1964–1966: Vashon HS (MO)

Head coaching record
- Overall: 9–6–5 (college)

Otis E. Finley Sr. (1898 – August 27, 1979) was an American football coach. He served as the head football coach Lincoln University in Jefferson City, Missouri in 1924 and at Virginia State College for Negroes—now known as Virginia State University–from 1925 to 1926, compiling a career college football coaching record of 9–6–5. Finley was born in 1898, in LaFayette, Alabama. He was a graduate of Tuskegee University, the University of Akron, and Springfield College in Springfield, Massachusetts. He died on August 27, 1979, in Maryland.

== Head coaching record ==
=== College ===
| Year | Team | Overall | Conference | Standing | Bowl/playoffs |
|---|---|---|---|---|---|
Lincoln Blue Tigers (Independent) (1924)
| 1924 | Lincoln | 2–1–1 | | | |
| Lincoln: | | 2–1–1 | | | |
Virginia State Trojans (Colored Intercollegiate Athletic Association) (1925–1926)
| 1925 | Virginia State | 3–1–4 | 1–1–3 | 4th | |
| 1926 | Virginia State | 4–4 | 3–4 | 5th | |
| Virginia State: | | 7–5–4 | 4–5–3 | | |
| Total: | | 9–6–5 | | | |
