= Charlotte Douglas (physician) =

Scottish obstetrician and gynaecologist

Charlotte Ann Douglas OBE FRCOG
- Born: 29 December 1894; Auchterarder, Scotland
- Died: 27 August 1979 (aged 84); Perth, Scotland
- Education: University of Glasgow (1919, 1925); University of Cambridge
- Occupations: Physician, senior medical officer for Scotland
- Known for: Progressive improvement of maternity services in Scotland
- Medical career
- Notable works: Report on Maternal Mortality and Morbidity in Scotland

Charlotte Douglas OBE FRCOG (29 December 1894 – 27 August 1979) was a Scottish obstetrician and gynaecologist. She was senior medical officer for Scotland in the 1920s and 30s and a campaigner for the progressive improvement of maternity services in Scotland. She was co-author of the landmark Report on Maternal Mortality and Morbidity in Scotland (1935), the recommendations of which led to the Maternity Services Scotland (1937) Act. Between 1935 and 1944, maternal mortality dropped from 4.8 per 1,000 births in 1937 to 3.0 per 1,000. Douglas received an OBE for her services to the medical profession in 1962.

== Early life and education ==
Charlotte Douglas was born on 29 December 1894 in Auchterarder, Perthshire to Georgina Cruickshank and Joseph Douglas, a bank manager.

She graduated from the University of Glasgow in 1919 with a Bachelor of Medicine degree, going on to receive a Diploma in Public Health from the University of Cambridge, before returning to Glasgow to complete her MD in 1925.

== Career ==
Early in her career Douglas worked as a house physician at Glasgow Royal Maternity and Women's Hospital and house surgeon at Glasgow Royal Infirmary. She also held a local authority public health position in Bradford.

On 23 March 1926, at the age of 31, Douglas was appointed Medical Officer to the Scottish Board of Health as an advisor on maternity and child welfare, a position that she went on to hold for over 30 years.

=== Report on Maternal Mortality and Morbidity in Scotland ===
In the 1920s and 1930s, there was concern regarding the high and rising maternal mortality rates, and Douglas made a significant contribution to their reduction. As a Medical Officer, she monitored maternity services and child welfare in Scotland, making reports to the Chief Medical Officer, which contributed to an improvement in maternity services and provision. In 1935, she and her colleague Dr Peter L. McKinlay published the Report on Maternal Mortality and Morbidity in Scotland, a comprehensive investigation into maternal death in Scotland. The report found that 60% of all deaths attributed to childbirth regarded as avoidable were caused by inadequate or intrusive medical care and a lack of medical support.

=== Maternity Services Scotland (1937) Act ===
The recommendations from the Douglas and McKinlay's report ultimately led to the Maternity Services Scotland (1937) Act after they were endorsed in the Scottish Health Services Committee Report (Cathcart Report) of 1936, a report on Scotland's health services which informed the development of the Scottish National Health Service. The Act required that any women could make application for the joint services of a physician and midwife throughout her pregnancy, labour, and the post-natal period, with the advice or help of an expert obstetrician. As a result, there was a 1,000% increase in the number of hospital beds available to pregnant women, increasing from 300 in 1926 to 3,000 in 1948. A drop in maternal mortality was recorded from 4.8 per 1,000 births in 1937 to 3.0 per 1,000 births in 1944.

=== Affiliations ===
Douglas was a member of both the Lothian Division of the British Medical Association and the Medical Women's Federation, and a Fellow of the Edinburgh Obstetrical Society. She was president of the Lothian Branch of the Royal College of Midwives and chair and vice-chair of the Scottish Council for Single Parents.

== Awards and honours ==
Douglas received an OBE for her services to the medical profession in 1962.

== Personal life ==
Outside her professional work, Douglas was a keen sportswoman with an interest in ice-skating, skiing and golf. She was an international ice-skating judge and ran an ice-skating club in Edinburgh.

Douglas died on 27 August 1979 in Perth, Scotland.
