= Concord University =

Public university in Athens, West Virginia, US

Coordinates: 37°25′32″N 81°0′16″W

- Former names: Concord State Normal School (1872–1931); Concord State Teachers College (1932–1943); Concord College (1943–2004)
- Type: Public university
- Established: February 28, 1872; 154 years ago
- Accreditation: HLC
- Academic affiliations: WVHEPC
- Endowment: $47.715 million (2022)
- President: Bethany Meighen
- Provost: Edward Huffstetler
- Students: 1,956(Fall 2024)
- Undergraduates: 1,389
- Postgraduates: 360
- Location: Athens, West Virginia, US
- Campus: 123-acre (50 ha); Distant town
- Other campuses: Beckley
- Newspaper: The Concordian
- Colors: Maroon and gray
- Nickname: Mountain Lions
- Sporting affiliations: NCAA Division II – MEC
- Mascot: Roar
- Website: concord.edu
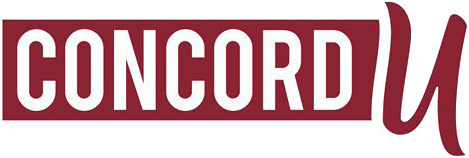

Concord University is a public university in Athens, West Virginia, United States. It was founded in 1872 by an act of the West Virginia Legislature, creating a normal school led by veterans of both the Union and the Confederacy.

Founded as a normal school for teacher preparation, Concord has transitioned to a comprehensive university.

The campus is situated on a knoll overlooking the Appalachian Mountains. It describes itself as "The Campus Beautiful." It also operates a teaching center and conducts classes in Beckley, West Virginia.

== History ==
Concord University was established as a Branch of the State Normal School in the community then known as "Concord Church" by the West Virginia State Legislature on February 28, 1872. The residents chose the name "Concord" to symbolize harmony and fellowship, a reflection of the post-Civil War era. A lack of immediate state funding meant that local efforts by five prominent families provided land and constructed a rudimentary building.

Classes commenced on May 10, 1875, with an inaugural class of 70 students. In 1887, West Virginia legislators appropriated state funds to construct a brick building on the site that is now Athens Middle School.

Due to confusion with another post office named Concord, Hampshire County, West Virginia, the town's name was changed to "Athens" in 1896. The town was renamed to the ancient center of learning and culture, but the school retained its original "Concord" description.

A fire in 1910 destroyed the original brick building, and the school was moved to its current site. A new building was built in 1912 and initially named "Old Main," which remains on the campus and is now Marsh Hall. Beginning in 1918, Concord saw the construction of new residence halls and a gymnasium. Its academic programs expanded beyond secondary-level instruction. In 1931, the name was changed to "Concord State Teachers College."

In 1943, the institution's name was shortened to "Concord College," and its facilities were used by the United States Army Air Corps 15th College Training Detachment. This program trained young soldiers as army pilots, integrating military and academic credit. After the war ended, Concord experienced growth in enrollment and its physical plant, including the construction of a new Science Building. Other new buildings over the years included the College Center, student and faculty housing, as well as an expansion of the curriculum and faculty.

In 1973, a proposal emerged from the West Virginia Board of Regents and the State Legislature to merge Concord College with nearby Bluefield State College. However, even an administrative consolidation proved contentious, and the idea was dropped in 1976. Concord's enrollment increased accompanied by the introduction of new academic programs.

In 2004, Concord College officially transitioned to "Concord University." This reflected expanded academic offerings, graduate programs, and the significance of the institution.

== Academics ==
Concord offers undergraduate programs in 11 emphasis areas and six graduate programs: Master of Education, Master of Social Work, Master of Arts in Health Promotion, Master of Arts in Teaching, Master of Athletic Training, and Master of Business Administration.

=== Colleges and departments ===
- College of Professional and Liberal Studies
- College of Science, Mathematics, and Health
- Graduate Studies

=== Undergraduate admissions ===
In 2025, the university accepted 89.6% of undergraduate applicants with those enrolled having an average 3.4 high school GPA. The university does not require submission of standardized test scores, but they will be considered when submitted. Those enrolled who submitted test scores had an average 960 SAT score (70% submitting scores) or an average 19 ACT score (30% submitting scores).

=== Rankings ===
Academic rankings

Regional
- U.S. News & World Report: 90 (South)

In 2026, U.S. News & World Report ranked the university tied at No. 90 out of 135 Regional Universities South, and out of Regional Universities South tied at No.46 in Top Public Schools, and tied at No.79 in Top Performers on Social Mobility.

== Facilities ==
- The majority of administrative offices, as well as the education, social sciences, languages and literature divisions, are located in Marsh Hall (known as "Admin" on campus). Marsh Hall also features a 48-bell carillon atop the building.
- The Science Building, attached to Marsh Hall, houses science laboratories and the natural sciences division. Located on the ground floor of the Science Building is the university's electron microprobe lab. This is West Virginia's only electron microprobe lab.
- The Alexander Fine Arts Center, home to the fine arts division, features the Main Auditorium, art galleries, H.C. Paul Theatre, art laboratories, classrooms, and the office of the student newspaper.
- The Carter Center houses the university's two gymnasiums, athletic offices, classrooms, racquetball courts, and indoor athletic facilities.
- The Student Center includes a cafeteria, food court, student government office, student support offices, mail office, and public relations offices. The Student Center also features a ballroom and conference facilities.
- The Bonner House houses the offices of the Bonner Scholars Program, a conference room, the counseling center, and faculty offices.
- The Woodrum House is home to students from the ALEF (Appalachian Leadership and Education Foundation) Fellowship, a leadership organization on campus.
- The Maintenance Building houses the public safety offices, receiving station, and maintenance facilities. Witherspoon Park features faculty housing.
- The President's House and Vice President's House as well as other homes are located on campus.
- The campus features an observatory.
- The university has the largest library in southern West Virginia, the J. Frank Marsh Library, which is a depository for federal documents. The library offers computer labs and facilities, microfiche, copying services, a juvenile section, and the university's archives. In the basement of the library, the university has its Center for Academic Technologies, which features a television studio, radio station and studio, a DNA laboratory, as well as distance education and technology classrooms.
- Outdoor athletic facilities include Callaghan Stadium featuring an artificial turf field funded by June O. Shott. Callaghan Stadium also features track and field facilities, tennis courts, and a baseball/softball practice field. Anderson Field, located on the outskirts of the campus, features the soccer field and baseball/softball field.
- Five main residence halls: The Twin Towers, North (women's) and South (men's), Laura A. Sarvay Hall (closed), Damarius O. Wilson Hall (co-ed), and W.S. "Woody" Wooddell Hall, referred to on-campus as "The Woo" (closed).
- The Nick Rahall Technology Center. It is the home of the Division of Business, the Entrepreneurial Studies Program, the Center for Academic Technologies, and the university computer center. This $14 million project is a central location for McDowell, Wyoming, Raleigh, Fayette, Greenbrier, Summers, Mercer and Monroe Counties of West Virginia where existing business may obtain training/orientation in technologies. The center also houses the Concord University Entrepreneurial Studies Program, supported by a grant from the Hugh Ike Shott Foundation. Incubator businesses, gifted Concord students, as well as professional Concord consulting faculty from the School of Business and other disciplines, are brought together in the Rahall Center to use the area's "brain trust" to create entrepreneurial advantages for Southern West Virginia. Concord University Esports Program is also located on the first floor and is a 24-time National Championship-winning program, established in 2019.
- The University Point facility, housing the Erickson Alumni Center, as well as the Wilkes Family Interfaith Chapel and Museum.

== Other campuses ==
Concord University offers classes at the Erma Byrd Higher Education Center in Beaver, West Virginia. This facility was established to coordinate the public colleges serving the region. US Senator Robert C. Byrd secured $10 million from the US Department of Health and Human Services to develop the campus and begin building the facility. The center was designed to also serve as a catalyst to attract business and industry to the area.

== Student life ==
Undergraduate demographics as of Fall 2023
Race and ethnicity	Total
White	80%
Black	8%
Two or more races	5%
International student	4%
Unknown	2%
Asian	1%
Hispanic	1%
Economic diversity
Low-income (Note: The percentage of students who received an income-based federal Pell grant intended for low-income students.)	48%
Affluent (Note: The percentage of students who are a part of the American middle class at the bare minimum.)	52%

=== Student organizations ===
Concord sponsors nearly 200 on-campus organizations, including fraternities, sororities, religious and political organizations, an Art Society, chapters of Delta Zeta, Alpha Sigma Alpha, Sigma Sigma Sigma, Phi Alpha Delta, Alpha Phi Omega, Tau Kappa Epsilon, Phi Sigma Phi, Sigma Tau Delta, Alpha Sigma Tau, Gay-Straight Alliance, College Republicans, Young Democrats, a chapter of Amtgard known as the "Shire of Nowhere Mountains," and a community theatre organization known as the Appalachian Shakespeare Project.

The Concord University Student Government Association (SGA) is responsible for many changes on campus and is active in every aspect of Concord life. All organizations are required to send a representative to all SGA meetings if they would like to ability to vote in the Student Senate and obtain budgetary privileges to request funds from the Student Government's Discretionary fund. The Student Government at Concord University is especially advanced compared to other SGAs in West Virginia, and is noted for its model judicial system wherein a student court, composed entirely of students, handles the majority of adjudications for most student offenses. The Student Government is also one of few student governments in the state of West Virginia that have a voting member on the university's Board of Governors.

=== Residence life ===
There are five residence halls on campus. North (female) and South (male) Towers house the fraternities and sororities as well as Honors and several sports teams. Each floor has two lounges. There is one co-ed hall, Sarvay, which is also the oldest building on campus still standing. Sarvay is traditionally a female dorm, but, due to a shortage of housing, men lived on the first floor. The other two halls are Wilson for women and Woodell, nicknamed "The Woo," for men. Housing is not divided by year. Several floors are set aside as "substance free," and the rest allow alcohol if both residents are over 21.

The North and South Towers complex underwent a major renovation, which was completed in 2017.

As of the fall semester of 2018, the only residence halls open were North Tower, South Tower, and Wilson Hall, due to lack of enrollment.

Wilson Hall now acts as a co-ed hall, with men and women living on separate floors.

== Athletics ==
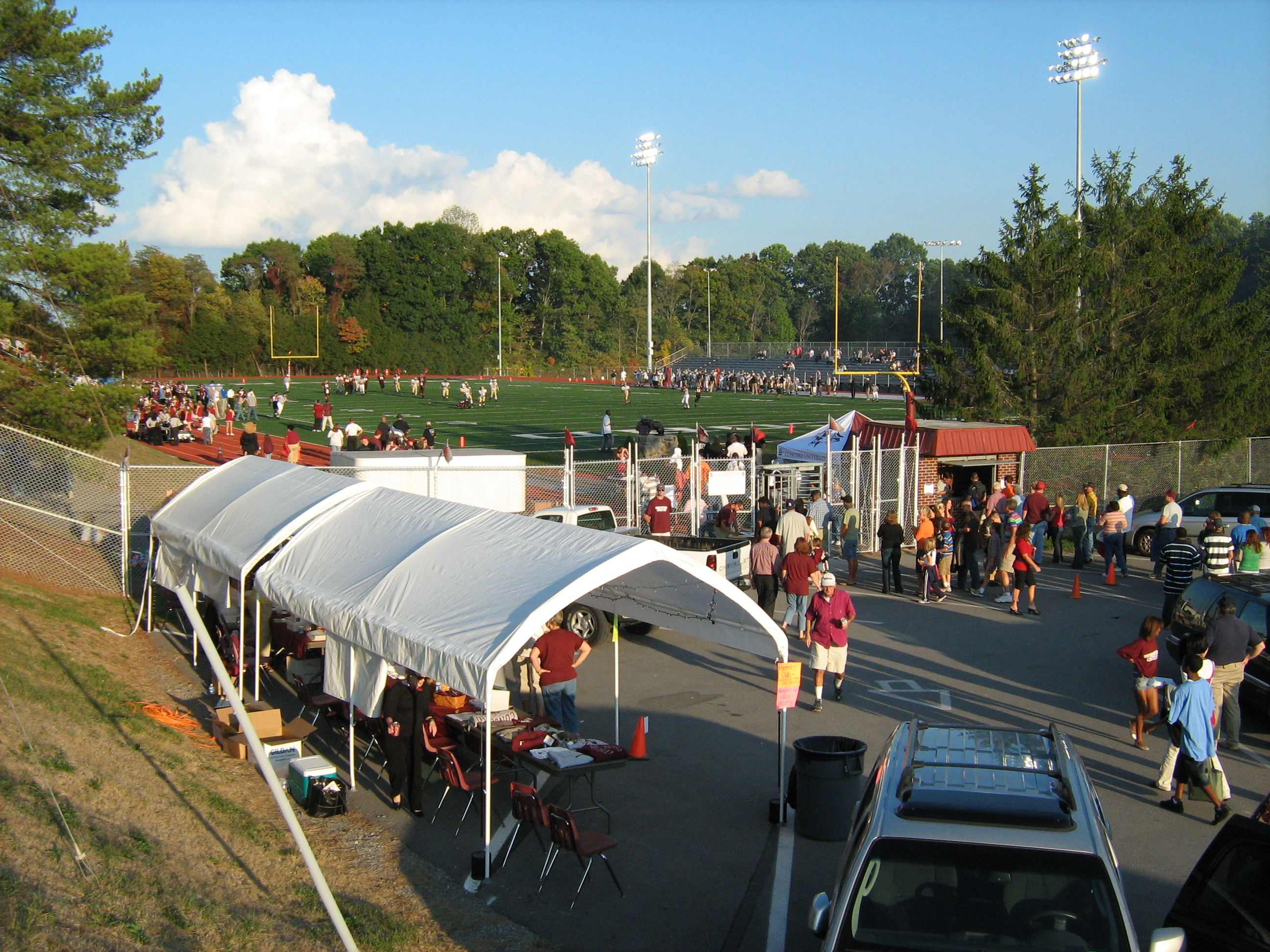
A football game on campus

Concord University, known athletically as the Mountain Lions, is home to many intercollegiate and intramural athletics teams. The men's intercollegiate teams include: baseball, basketball, football, cross country, golf, soccer, tennis, and track and field. The women's intercollegiate teams include basketball, cheerleading, cross country, golf, soccer, softball, tennis, and track and field. Concord University is an NCAA Division II school, and a member of the Mountain East Conference. The Office of Student Affairs provides intramurals in many athletic activities, including flag football, volleyball, and basketball.

== People ==
=== Notable alumni ===
- Ronald J. Bacigal, professor of law, University of Richmond School of Law
- Robert Byrd, US Senator from West Virginia
- Don Caruth, West Virginia politician
- Phil Conley, West Virginian historian, author, and teacher
- Creigh Deeds, Virginia state senator
- Alexander Harman, Justice of the Supreme Court of Virginia
- Kahlil Joseph, film, television, and stage actor as well as a teacher of performing arts
- Jackson L. Kiser, judge of the United States District Court for the Western District of Virginia
- Christy Martin, world champion boxer
- Josh McKinney, first member of disability teams to be inducted into the National Soccer Hall of Fame
- Bret Munsey, Arena Football League coach
- Elliott Pritt, politician in the West Virginia House of Delegates from 2022 to 2026, representing the 50th district in Fayette County
- Daniel Richards, professional wrestler
- Freida J. Riley, teacher who influenced the Rocket Boys, subjects of the movie October Sky
- Josh Stowers, member, West Virginia House of Delegates

== Gallery ==
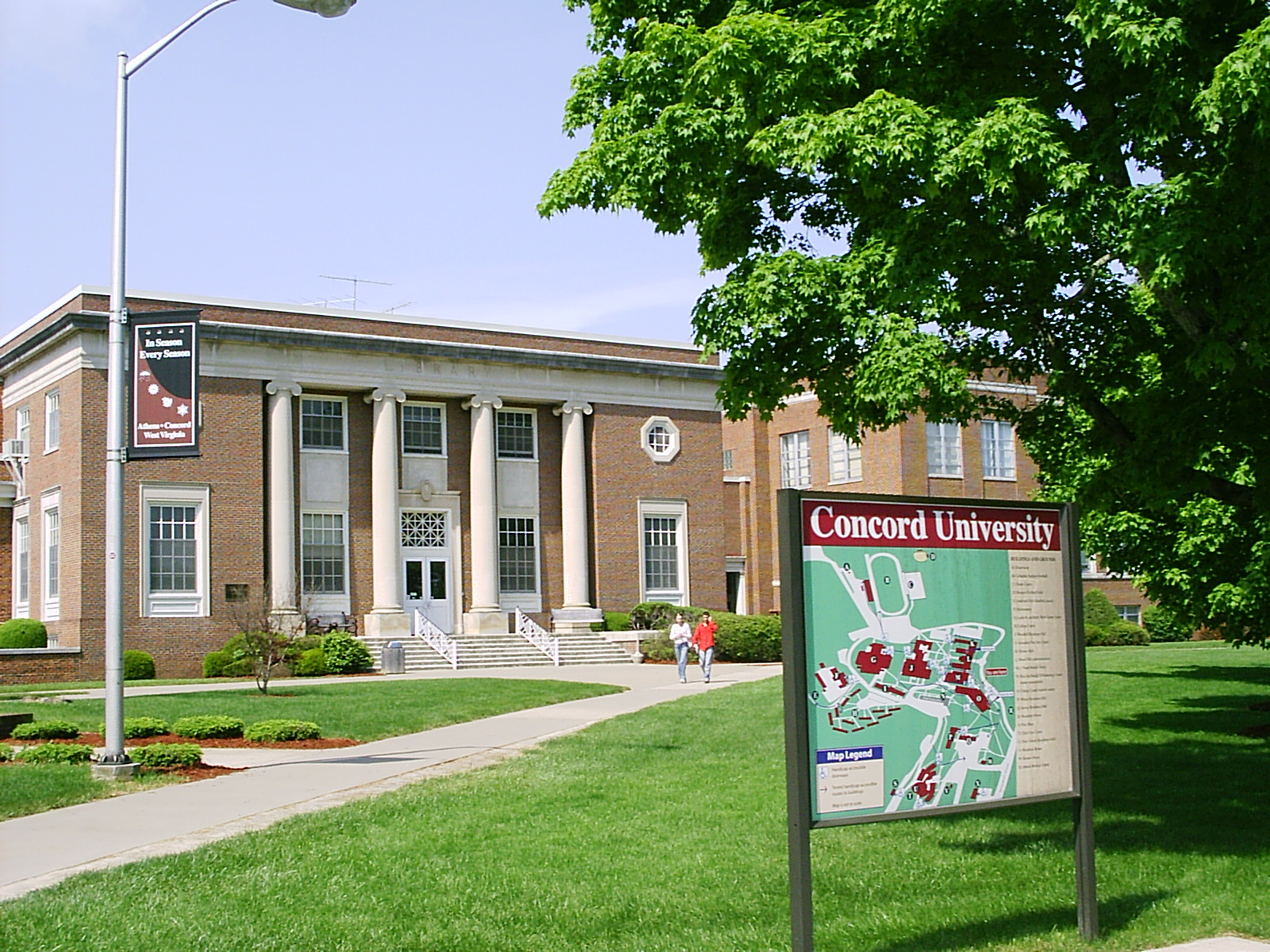
Concord University Library

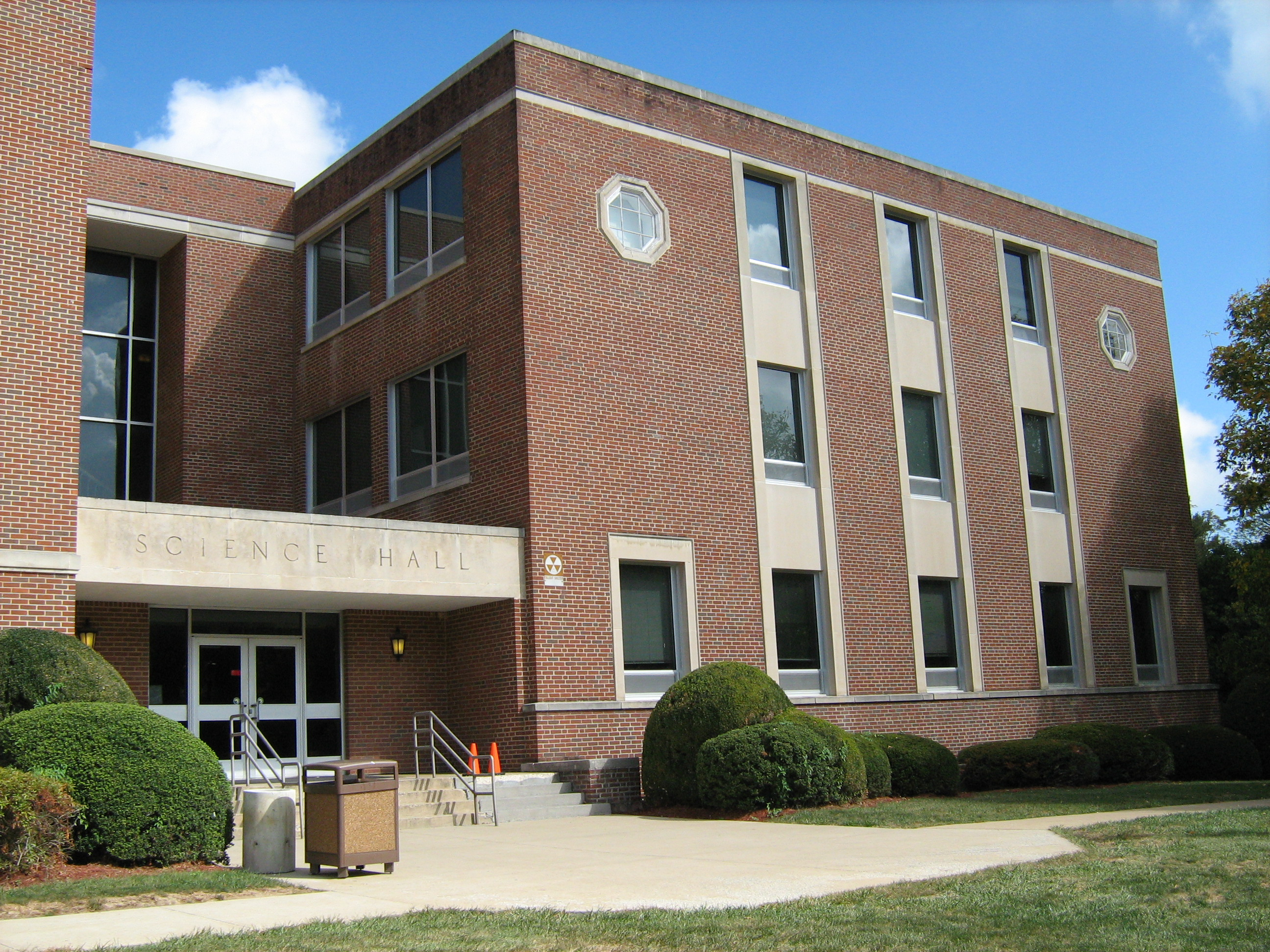
Entrance to the Science Hall

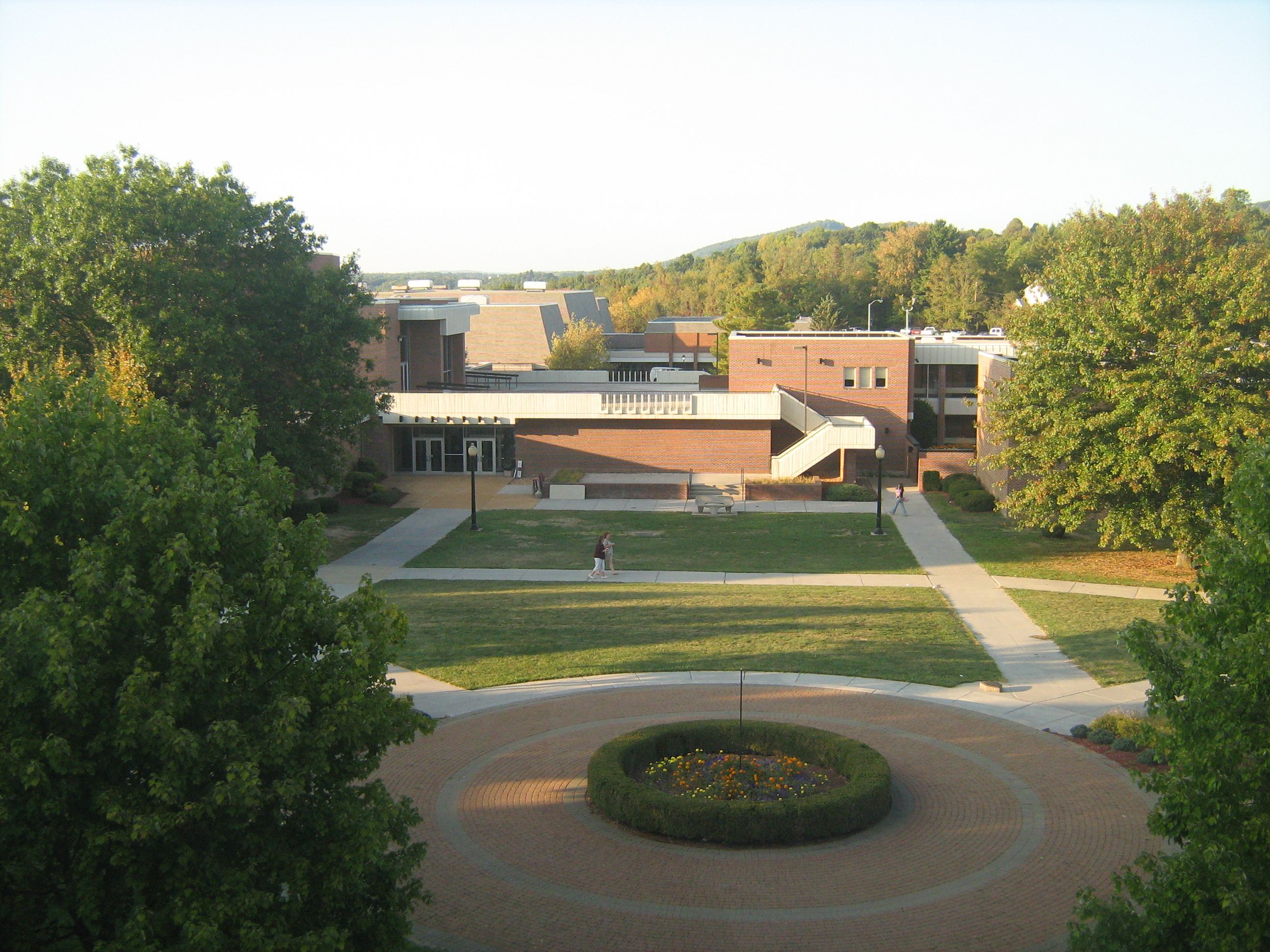
Art Building and part of the Theatre on the left

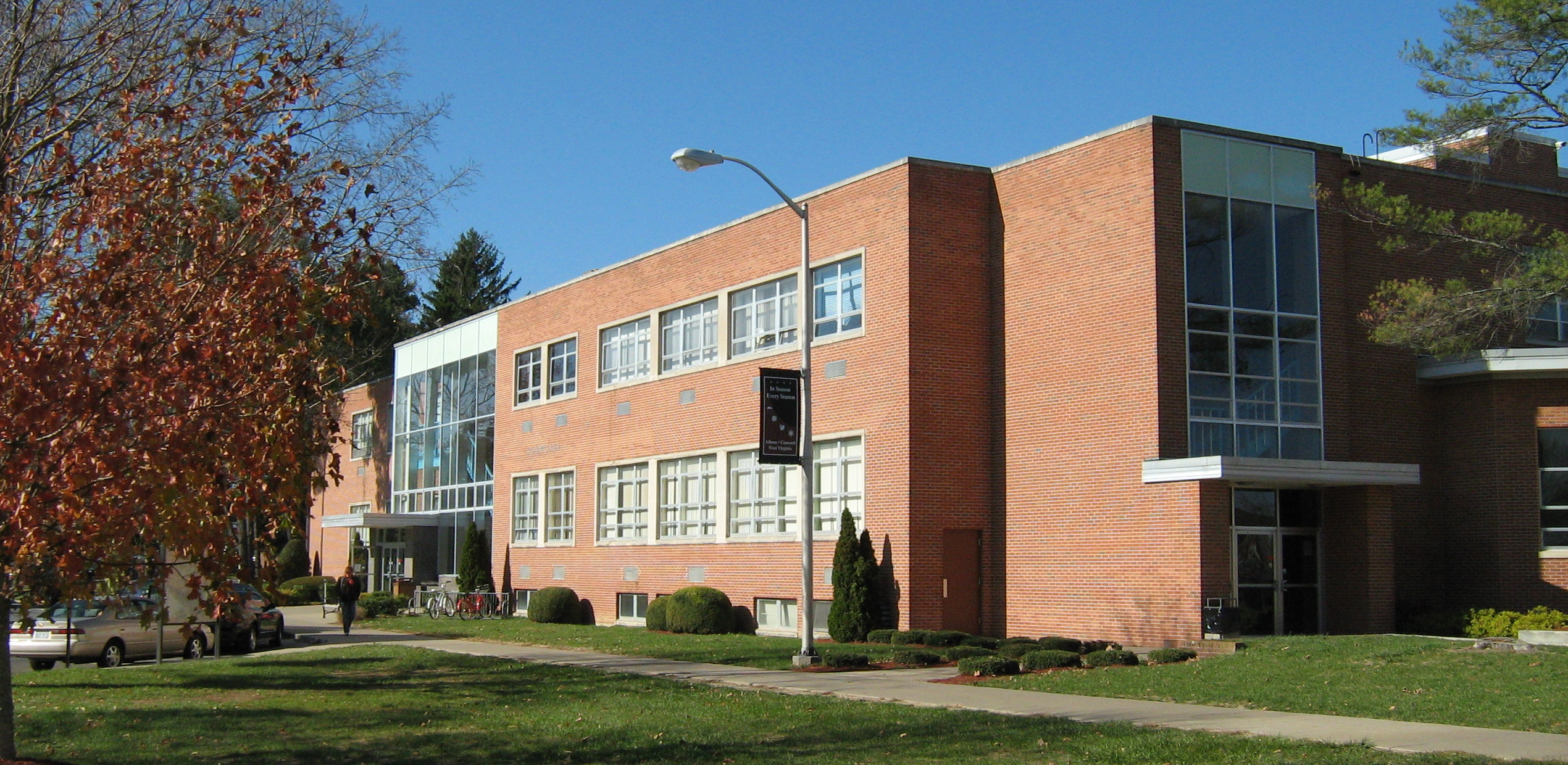
Student Center on the Athens campus

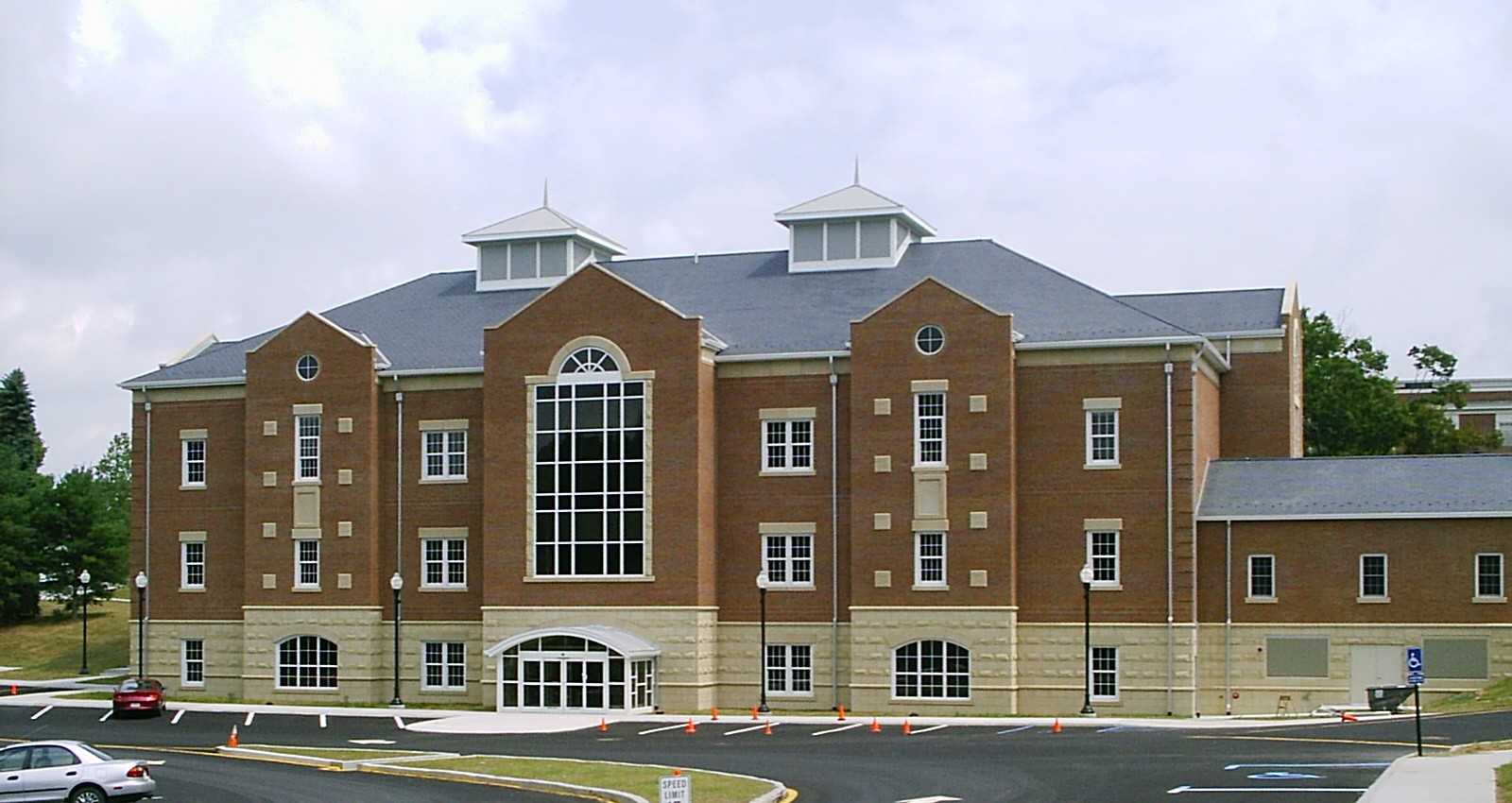
Nick J. Rahall Center

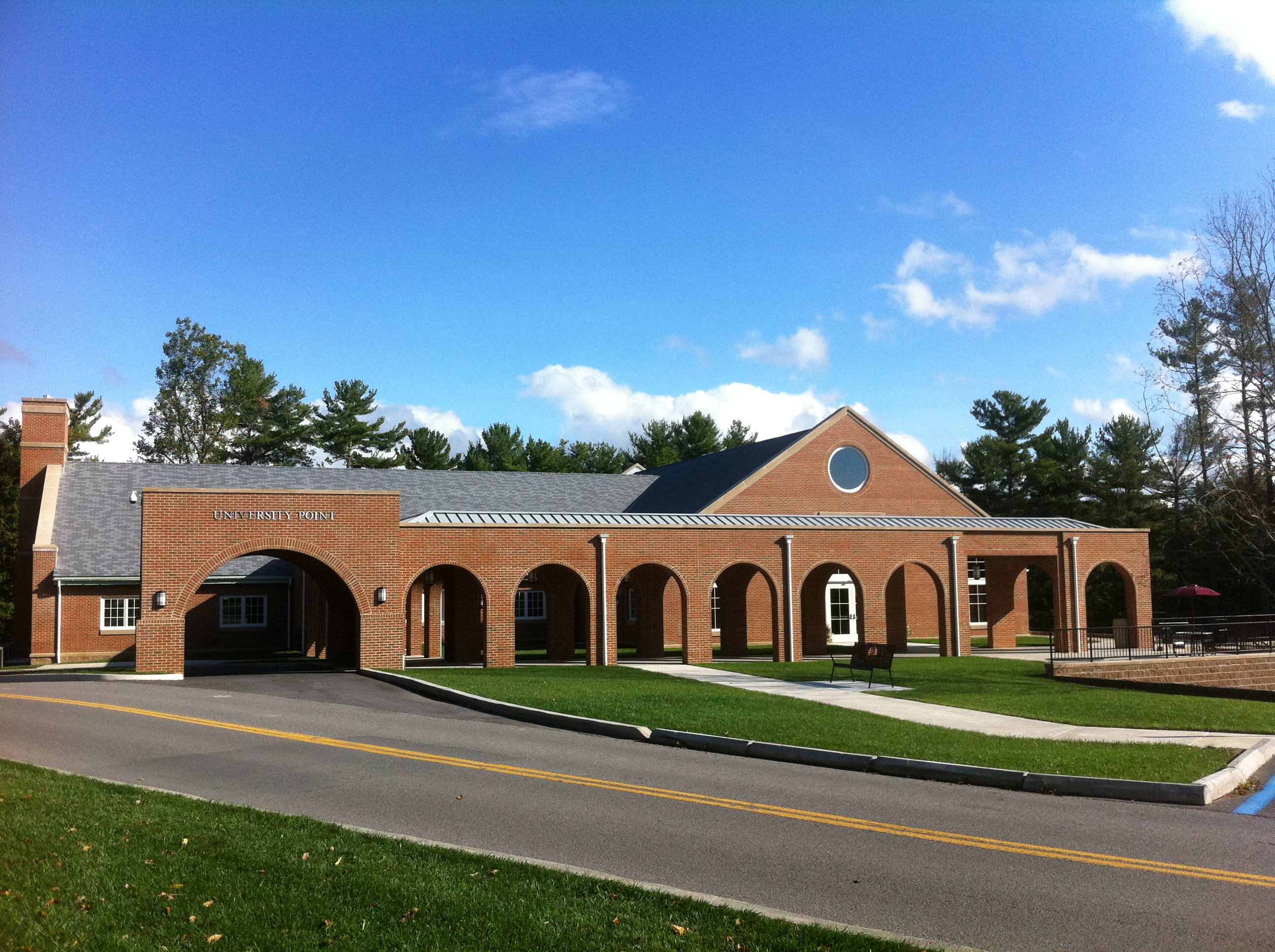
University Point

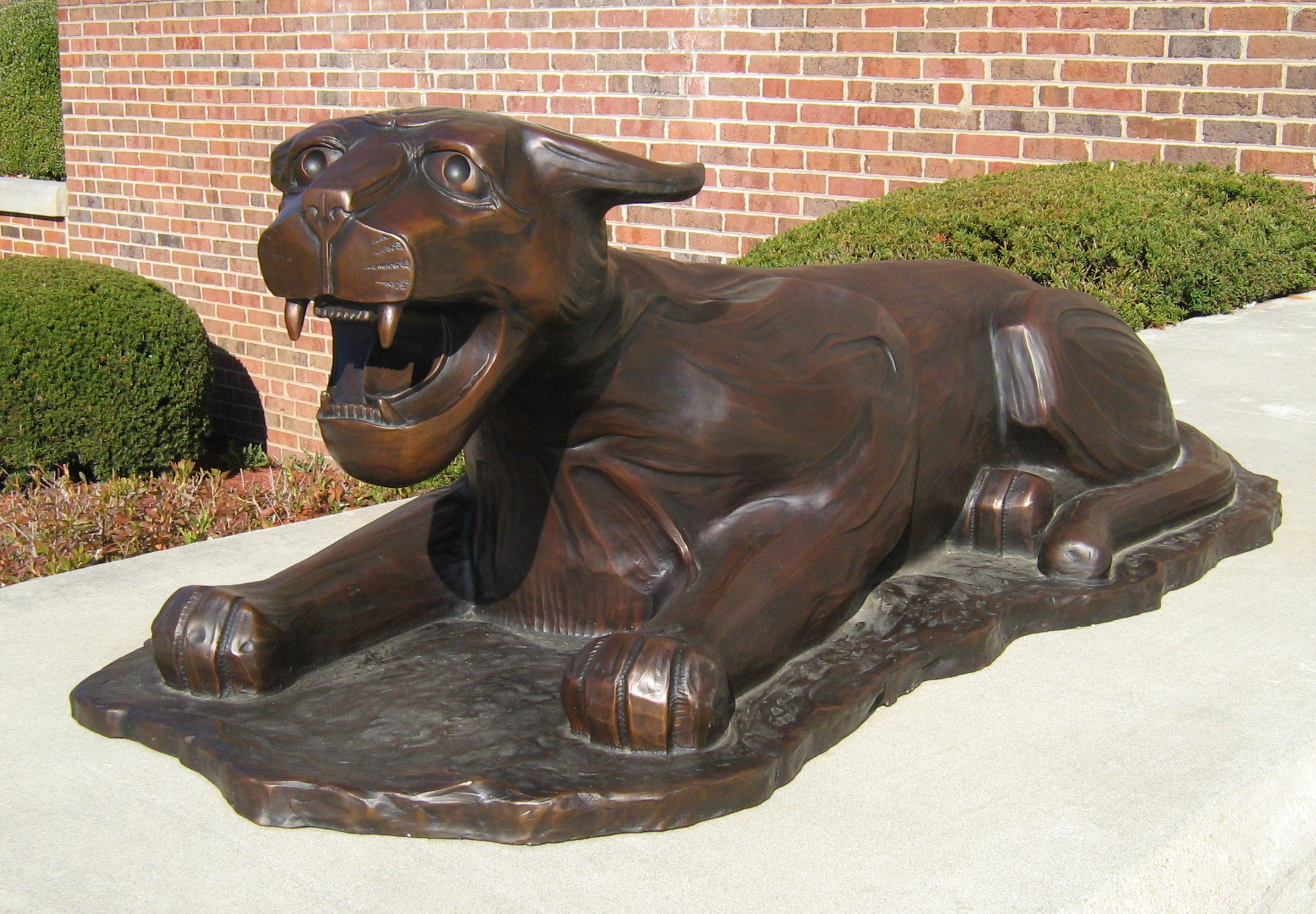
A mountain lion in front of the library

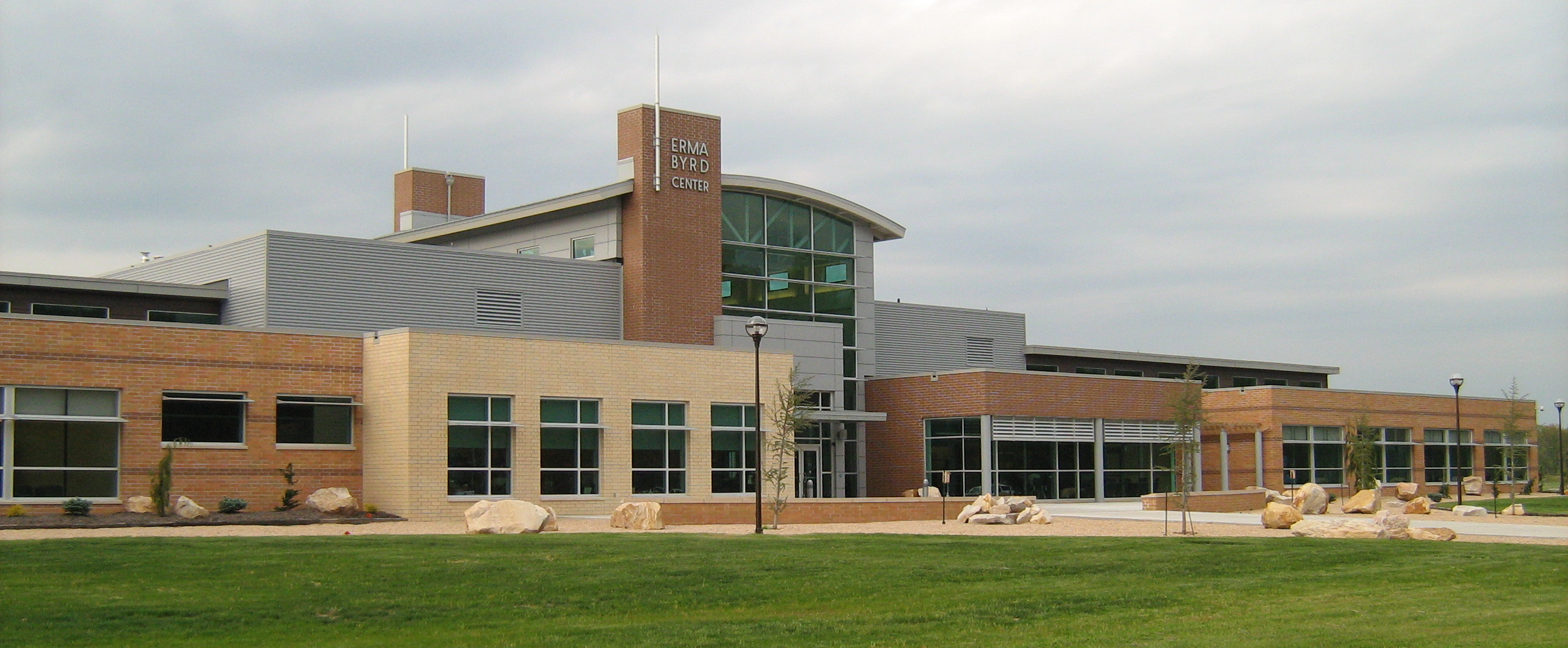
The Erma Byrd Higher Education Center

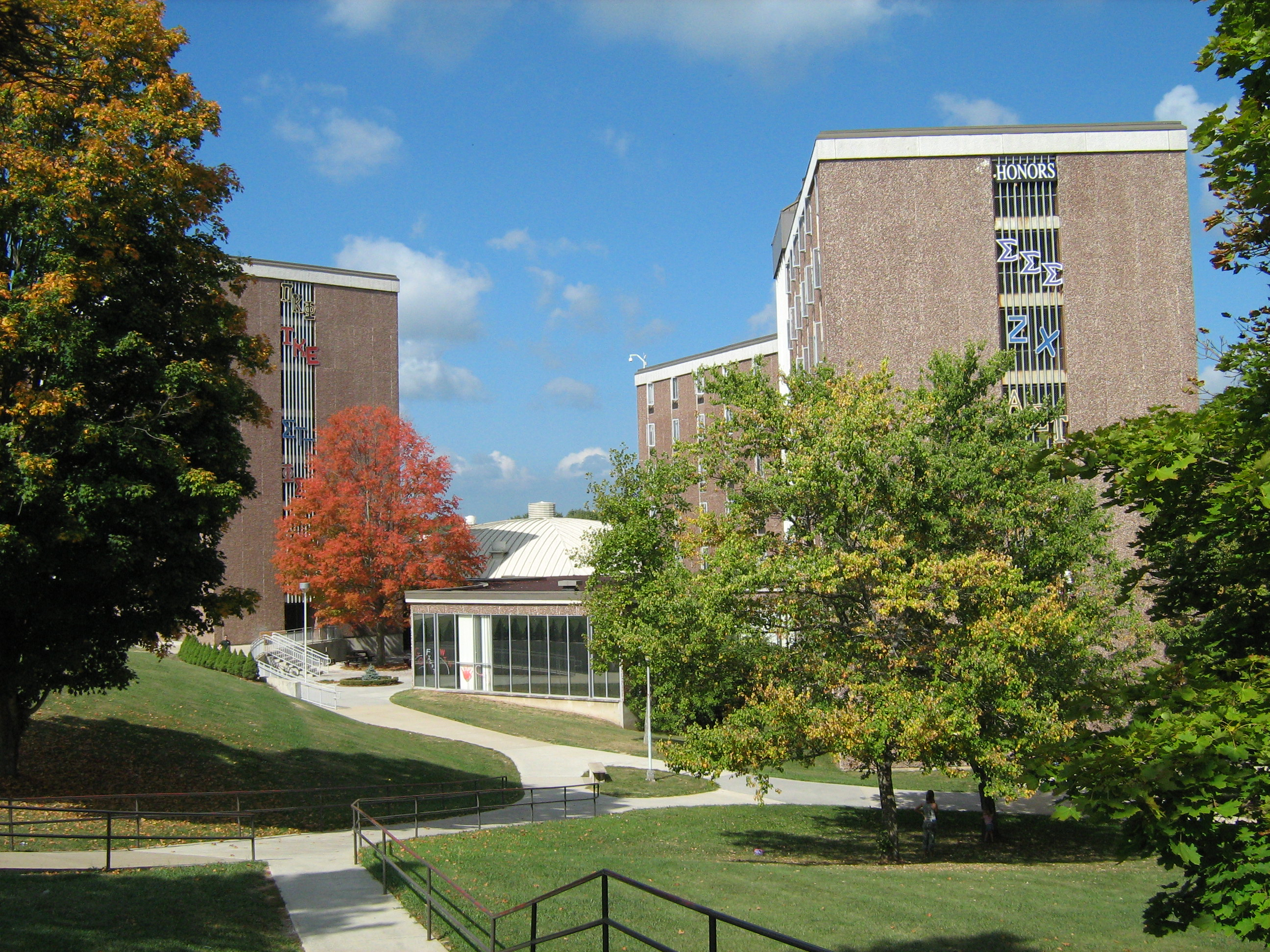
Residence halls, the North and South Towers

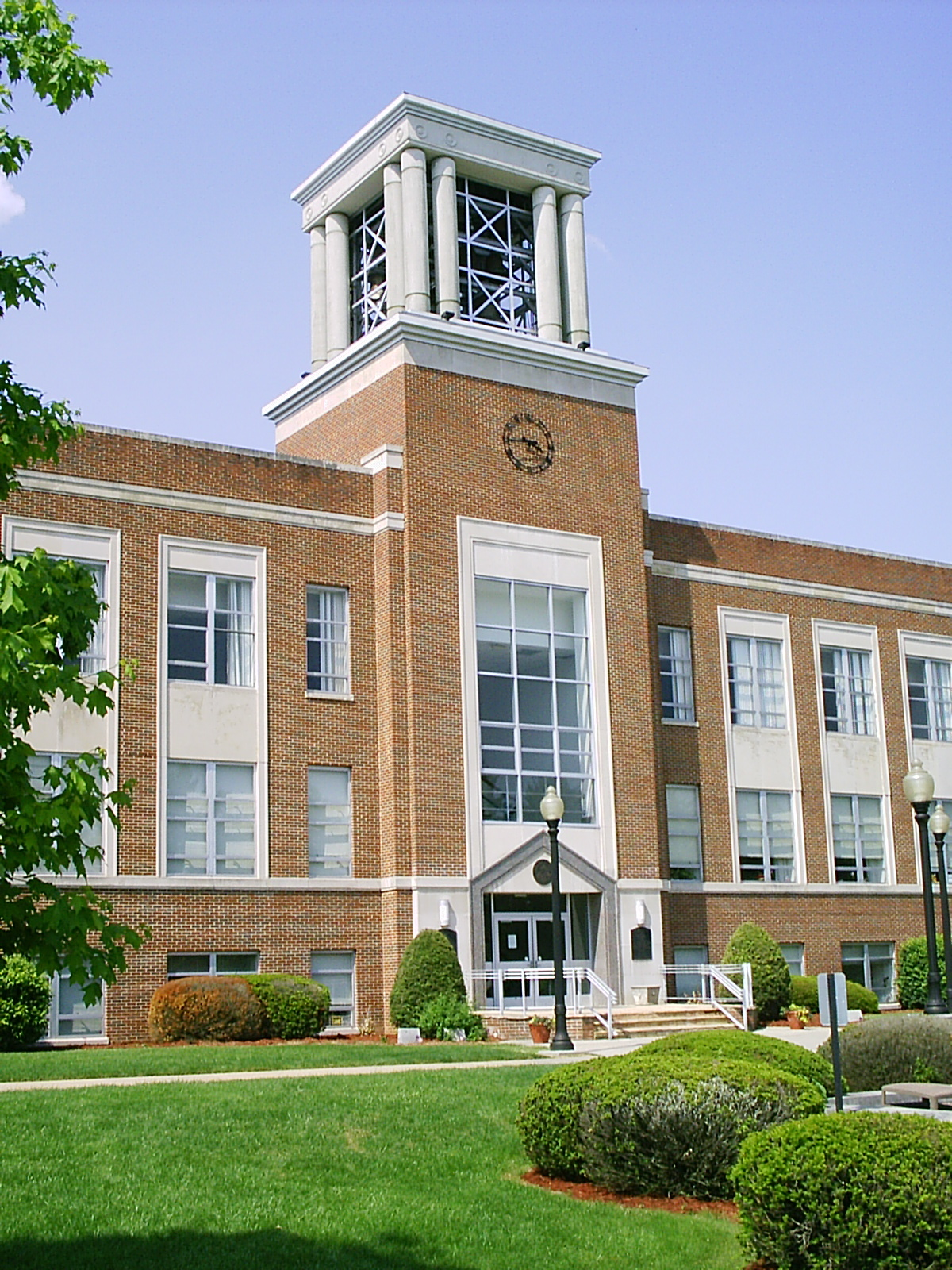
Marsh Hall and its bell tower
