= Claude Achurch =

Australian cricketer

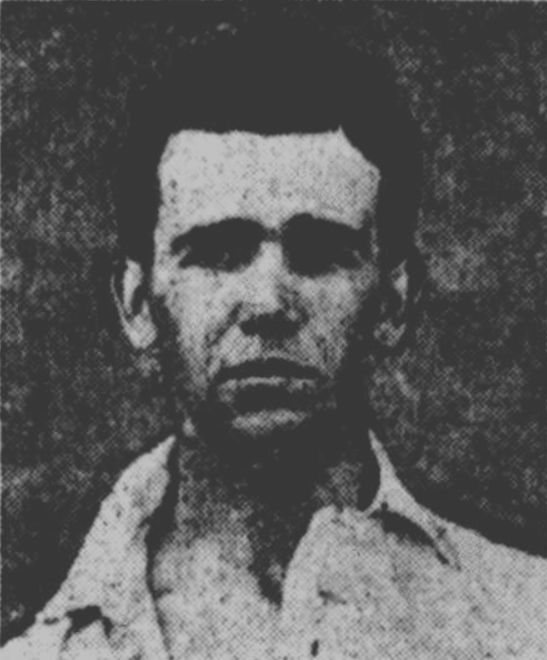

Personal information
- Full name: Claude Septimus Achurch
- Born: 16 August 1896; Dubbo, New South Wales, Australia
- Died: 15 August 1979 (aged 82)
- Batting: Right-handed

Domestic team information
- Years: Team
- 1921/22: New South Wales
- FC debut: 3 December 1921 NSW v Queensland
- Last FC: 16 December 1921 NSW v South Australia

Career statistics
Competition	First class
Matches	2
Runs scored	64
Batting average	16
100s/50s	0/0
Top score	37
Catches/stumpings	1/–
- Source: CricketArchive, 28 June 2016

Claude Septimus Achurch (16 August 1896 – 15 August 1979) was an Australian cricketer, who played for New South Wales in first-class cricket.
