= Philip Mallory Conley =

American historian (1887–1979)

Philip Mallory Conley (November 30, 1887 – August 1, 1979) was a West Virginian historian, author and teacher. He was born in Charleston, West Virginia. He received his LL.D. degree from Concord University.

== Selected bibliography ==
- Life in a West Virginia Coal Field, 1923
- Everyday Philosophy.Charleston, W. Va.: West Virginia Pub. Co., 1944.
- Phil Conley and Boyd B. Stutler: West Virginia Yesterday and Today [1931]. 3. ed. Charleston, W. Va.: Education Foundation, 1952.
- Alcibiades. An Autobiography, 1957
