= Frank Solbé =

English cricketer and hockey player

Frank de Lisle Solbé (1 June 1871 – 12 January 1933) was an English international hockey player, who also played cricket.

Born in Chefoo, China, Solbé was educated at Dulwich College, where he played for the school's cricket eleven in 1887 and 1888. Described by the Wisden Cricketers' Almanack as being "a free and attractive batsman", he nonetheless struggled at first-class level, making occasional appearances for Kent County Cricket Club and Marylebone Cricket Club.

In 1897, Solbé made his first appearance for the England national field hockey team, and went on to play for them twice more in 1899 and once in 1900. He scored three times in 1899; once against Ireland and twice against Wales.

He died in Bromley in 1933, aged 61.

== Bibliography ==
- Carlaw, Derek (2020). Kent County Cricketers, A to Z: Part One (1806–1914) (PDF). Cardiff: ACS.
