= Wally Annables =

English footballer

Personal information
- Full name: Walter Annables
- Date of birth: 31 October 1911
- Place of birth: Swinton, West Riding of Yorkshire, England
- Date of death: 16 August 1979 (aged 67)
- Height: 5 ft 11 in (1.80 m)
- Position: Full-back

Senior career*
Years	Team	Apps	(Gls)
1930–1932	Mexborough Athletic		
1932–1936	Grimsby Town	6	(0)
1936–1939	Hull City	62	(1)
1939	Carlisle United	0	(0)
- * Club domestic league appearances and goals

Walter Annables (31 October 1911 – 16 August 1979) was an English professional footballer who played as a full-back.
