= Walter Watson =

Walter Watson may refer to:

- Walter Watson (footballer) (1890–1956), English footballer
- Walter Watson (lichenologist), British lichenologist
- Walter Watson (priest), Anglican priest
- Walter Watson (banker), Scottish-American banker
- Walter A. Watson, Virginia lawyer and politician
