= 1911–12 Aston Villa F.C. season =

English football club season

Aston Villa
1911–12 season
- President: Joseph Ansell
- Chairman: Frederick Rinder
- Manager: George Ramsay
- First Division: 6th
- FA Cup: Round 2
Home colours

First Division
- Season: 1911–12
- Champions: Blackburn Rovers; 1st English title
- Relegated: Preston North End; Bury
- Top goalscorer: Harry Hampton; David McLean; George Holley (25 goals each)
- Biggest home win: The Wednesday 8–0 Sunderland (26 December 1911)
- Biggest away win: Sheffield United 0–5 Bolton (9 September 1911)
- Highest scoring: Sheffield United 7–3 Bradford City (4 March 1912)

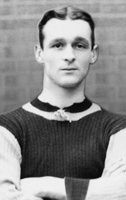
"Happy" Harry Hampton, League top scorer

The 1911-12 English football season was Aston Villa's 24th season in the Football League.

"Happy" Harry Hampton was a prolific goalscorer and scored five goals when Aston Villa beat Sheffield Wednesday 10–0 in a First Division match in 1912. Hampton was joint top goalscorer in the First Division this season. "The Wellington Whirlwind," played as a centre forward for Aston Villa from 1904 to 1920.

In March, Justice A.T. Lawrence established the legality of the football league's retain-and-transfer system with his judgement in the Kingaby case. Former Aston Villa player Herbert Kingaby had brought legal proceedings against his old club for preventing him from playing. Erroneous strategy by Kingaby's counsel resulted in the suit being dismissed.

There were also debuts for Dicky Roose, Les Askew, Jimmy Birch, Harold Edgley, Bert Goode, Tommy Weston, Frank Mann, Albert Ralphs, Albert Lindon, Len Richards, Walter Watson, Bill Morris and Wilfred Littlewood.

== Final League table ==
Pos	Team	Pld	W	D	L	GF	GA	GAv	Pts
4	Bolton Wanderers	38	20	3	15	54	43	1.256	43
5	The Wednesday	38	16	9	13	69	49	1.408	41
6	Aston Villa	38	17	7	14	76	63	1.206	41
7	Middlesbrough	38	16	8	14	56	45	1.244	40
8	Sunderland	38	14	11	13	58	51	1.137	39

Source: World Football
Rules for classification: 1) Points; 2) Goal average; 3) Goals scored

=== Matches ===
2 September 1911	Bradford	2–1	Aston Villa	Valley Parade
		Report	Harry Hampton (24')

4 September 1911	Aston Villa	0–3	Albion	Villa Park
		Report

9 September 1911	Aston Villa	4–1	Arsenal	Villa Park
	Joe Walters (17'); Harry Hampton (37', 56'); Charlie Wallace (77' pen)	Report

16 September 1911	Manchester City	2–6	Aston Villa	Hyde Road
		Report	Joe Walters (33'); Joe Bache (2–1, 3–1, 4–2); Harry Hampton (5–2, 6–2)

23 September 1911	Aston Villa	3–0	Everton	Villa Park
	Harry Hampton (1'); Charlie Wallace (68' pen); Joe Walters (89')	Report

30 September 1911	Albion	2–2	Aston Villa	The Hawthorns
		Report	Harry Hampton (8'); Horace Henshall (50')

7 October 1911	Aston Villa	1–3	Sunderland	Villa Park
	Charlie Wallace (20' pen)	Report
Note: Alfred Edwards made his debut - he would be killed in action during WWI

14 October 1911	Blackburn	3–1	Aston Villa	Ewood Park
		Report	Charlie Wallace (59' pen)

21 October 1911	Aston Villa	2–3	Wednesday	Villa Park
	Jimmy Birch (34', 89')	Report

23 October 1911	Sheffield United	0–1	Aston Villa	Bramall Lane
		Report	Joe Walters (61')

28 October 1911	Bury	1–1	Aston Villa	Gigg Lane
		Report	Joe Walters (60')

4 November 1911	Aston Villa	2–1	Middlesbrough	Villa Park
	Charlie Wallace (24'); Joe Walters (50')	Report

18 November 1911	Aston Villa	2–2	Tottenham Hotspur	Villa Park
	Harry Hampton (37', 68')	Report

25 November 1911	Manchester United	3–1	Aston Villa	Old Trafford
		Report	Sammy Whittaker (1–2)

2 December 1911	Aston Villa	5–0	Liverpool	Villa Park
	Charlie Wallace (37' pen, 83'); Joe Bache (71'); Bert Goode (58', 73')	Report

9 December 1911	Aston Villa	1–0	Preston North End	Villa Park
	Joe Bache (23')	Report

16 December 1911	Newcastle United	6–2	Aston Villa	St James' Park
		Report	Harry Hampton (38'); Joe Bache (42')

23 December 1911	Aston Villa	1–0	Sheffield United	Villa Park
	Charlie Wallace (64')	Report

26 December 1911	Aston Villa	6–1	Oldham	Villa Park
	Harry Hampton (12', 40', 80', 89'); Clem Stephenson (37', 81')	Report

30 December 1911	Aston Villa	0–0	Bradford	Villa Park
		Report

1 January 1912	Bolton	3–0	Aston Villa	Burnden Park
		Report

6 January 1912	Arsenal	2–2	Aston Villa	Manor Ground
		Report	Joe Walters (12'); Charlie Wallace (80')

20 January 1912	Aston Villa	3–1	Manchester City	Villa Park
	Charlie Wallace (8', 52'); Clem Stephenson (62')	Report

27 January 1912	Everton	1–1	Aston Villa	Goodison Park
		Report	Harry Hampton (23')

10 February 1912	Sunderland	2–2	Aston Villa	Roker Park
		Report	Clem Stephenson (24'); Horace Henshall (70')

17 February 1912	Aston Villa	0–3	Blackburn	Villa Park
		Report

24 February 1912	Wednesday	3–0	Aston Villa	Owlerton
		Report

2 March 1912	Aston Villa	5–2	Bury	Villa Park
	Harry Hampton (6', 12', 25', 82'); Charlie Wallace (66')	Report

9 March 1912	Middlesbrough	1–2	Aston Villa	Ayresome Park
		Report	Charlie Wallace (23'); Joe Bache (76')

13 March 1912	Notts County	2–0	Aston Villa	Meadow Lane
		Report

16 March 1912	Aston Villa	5–1	Notts County	Villa Park
	Harry Hampton (14', 30'); Clem Stephenson (15'); Bert Goode (23'); Charlie Wallace (70')	Report

23 March 1912	Tottenham Hotspur	2–1	Aston Villa	White Hart Lane
		Report	Harold Edgley (2')

30 March 1912	Aston Villa	6–0	Manchester United	Villa Park
	Clem Stephenson (14', 51', 52'); Charlie Wallace (59', 66'); Harry Hampton (68')	Report

5 April 1912	Aston Villa	0–1	Bolton	Villa Park
		Report

6 April 1912	Liverpool	1–2	Aston Villa	Anfield
		Report	Harry Hampton (9'); Clem Stephenson (51')

8 April 1912	Oldham	1–2	Aston Villa	Boundary Park
		Report	Joe Walters (1–0); Clem Stephenson (2–1)

13 April 1912	Preston North End	4–1	Aston Villa	Deepdale
		Report	Harry Hampton (67')

20 April 1912	Aston Villa	2–0	Newcastle	Villa Park
	Harry Hampton (86'); Albert Hall (89')	Report

Source: avfchistory.co.uk

== FA Cup ==
- 🟩 13 Jan 1912, Villa 6-0 Walsall, Villa Park
- 🟨 3 Feb 1912, Villa 1-1 Reading, Villa Park
- 🟥 7 Feb 1912, Villa 0-1 Reading, Elm Park
