= Arthur Moss (disambiguation) =

Arthur Moss (1889–1969) was an American poet and editor.

Arthur Moss may also refer to:

- Arthur Moss (footballer) (1887–1964), English footballer
- Arthur J. Moss (1931–2018), American cardiologist

== See also ==
- Arthur Mosse (1872–1956), American football player and coach
