= Tim Coleman =

English footballer (1881–1940)

Personal information
- Full name: John George Coleman
- Date of birth: 26 October 1881
- Place of birth: Kettering, England
- Date of death: 20 November 1940 (aged 59)
- Place of death: Kensington, England
- Position: Forward

Senior career*
Years	Team	Apps	(Gls)
–1901	Kettering Town		
1901–1902	Northampton Town		
1902–1908	Woolwich Arsenal	172	(79)
1908–1910	Everton	71	(30)
1910–1911	Sunderland	32	(20)
1911–1914	Fulham	94	(45)
1914–1915	Nottingham Forest	37	(14)
1915-1916 (loan)	Queens Park Rangers	6	(2)
1920–1921	Tunbridge Wells Rangers	37	(39)

International career
1907	England	1	(0)

Managerial career
- Maidstone United (reserves)
- 1925–1927: SC Enschede
- 1927–: VV Oldenzaal
- –1932: TSV NOAD
- DHC Delft
- * Club domestic league appearances and goals

John George "Tim" Coleman MM (26 October 1881 – 20 November 1940) was an English footballer who played as a forward for Kettering Town, Northampton Town, Woolwich Arsenal, Everton, Sunderland, Fulham, Nottingham Forest, Queen Park Rangers and Tunbridge Wells Rangers. He made a single appearance for the England national football team and later in life was a manager in the Netherlands.

== Career ==
Coleman was born in Kettering, Northamptonshire and first played for local non-league clubs, Kettering Town and then Northampton Town in 1901. He was signed by Second Division Woolwich Arsenal in the summer of 1902, and immediately became a regular goalscorer for the club.

Coleman made his debut against Preston North End on 6 September 1902, and in his first season was top scorer with 17 goals in 30 matches, as Arsenal finished third. The following season he broke his own record and scored 23 goals in 28 games, which along with strike partner Tommy Shanks' 25 goals, helped Arsenal to second spot and thus promotion to the First Division. Coleman found 1905–06, his first season at the top, tough going (he only scored five goals), but the following season he scored 15 in 34 matches. Coleman's season was topped with Arsenal reaching the FA Cup semi-finals (which they lost to Newcastle United), and his one and only cap for England, against Ireland on 16 February 1907.

Despite their success on the pitch, Woolwich Arsenal were suffering from financial difficulties, and willingly accepted a bid of £700 for Coleman from Everton in February 1908, near the end of the 1907–08 season. In total, Coleman had played 196 games for Arsenal, scoring 84 goals. Coleman was a regular during the two and a half seasons he spent at Goodison Park, helping the Toffees to runners-up spot in 1908–09, and scoring 30 goals in 71 league appearances. While at Everton, he was notable for being one of the few players, along with most of the Manchester United squad, to maintain their membership of the Players' Union (the forerunner of the Professional Footballers' Association), in defiance of Football Association rules. After a standoff, the FA backed down.

Coleman later had spells at Sunderland (1910–11),. Fulham (1911–14), and Nottingham Forest (1914–15). With the outbreak of the First World War and the suspension of first-class football, Coleman retired from the professional game, although he still played in both Wartime football at Queen Park Rangers and non-league football, most notably for Tunbridge Wells Rangers, finally retiring in 1921. He subsequently served as player-manager of the reserve team at Maidstone United. Coleman later moved to the Netherlands, where he managed a number of the clubs to promotion. He died at St Mary Abbots Hospital in November 1940, at the age of 59, when he fell through the roof of a generating station in South Kensington.

== Personal life ==
Coleman served as a private in the Middlesex Regiment during the First World War and was awarded the Military Medal for bravery in October 1918. On 29 December 1916, Coleman was misreported in the Sporting Chronicle as having been killed in action.

== Honours ==
=== As a player ===
Woolwich Arsenal

- Football League Second Division second-place promotion: 1903–04

=== As a manager ===
SC Enschede

- Eerste Klasse: 1925–26

VV Oldenzaal

- Vierde Klasse: 1928–29

DHC Delft

- Tweede Klasse: 1932–33

== Sources ==
- Harris, Jeff (1995). Hogg, Tony (ed.). Arsenal Who's Who. Independent UK Sports. ISBN 1-899429-03-4.
- Myerson, George (2009). Fighting for Football: The Story of Tim Coleman, Forgotten Defender of Players' Rights and First World War Hero. Aurum. ISBN 978-1-84513-409-9.
