= Transfer (association football) =

Sports action in which a player moves between clubs

In professional association football, a transfer is when a player under contract moves from one club to another. It refers to the transferring of a player's registration to their new club. In general, players can only be transferred during a transfer window and according to the rules set by a governing body. A transfer fee is the agreed financial compensation paid by the new club to the selling club.

When a player moves from one club to another, their old contract is terminated whilst the player and their new club will both negotiate on new contract terms, or have earlier agreed on the personal terms. A transfer in association football differs from a trade in American, Canadian, and Australian sports, where teams essentially exchange players and their contracts, occasionally including cash as well. In some cases, football transfers operate in a similar way, as teams can exchange players as part of the deal. According to FIFA, from January to September 2018 there were 15,049 international transfers of male players with fees totalling US$7.1 billion, and 577 international transfers of female players for US$493,235.

Most transfer activity is conducted during the European summer transfer window (European pre-season window), between 1 July and 31 August each year (both dates inclusive), with slight variations of the start date and end dates for each domestic league. Some transfers also occur during the European winter transfer window of 1–31 January. The transfer deadline dates of the windows are solely reliant upon the country jurisdiction of the purchasing club, in order to register newly transferred players. Football clubs worldwide may sell the playing rights of a contracted player at any time to another club whose country's transfer window is still open. In addition, free agents (players who are not under contract) may be signed at any time outside the transfer windows.

== History ==
=== Early days of transfers ===
The concept of a football transfer first came into existence in England after The Football Association (FA) introduced player registration sometime after 1885. Before that, a player could agree to play one or more matches for any football club. After the FA recognised professionalism in 1885, it sought to control professional players by introducing a player registration system. Players had to register with a club each season, even if he remained with the same club as in the season before. A player was not allowed to play until he was registered for that season. Once a player was registered with a club he was not allowed to be registered with or play for another club during the same season without the permission of the FA and the club that held his registration. However players were free to join another club before the start of each season, even if their former club wished to retain them.

Sometime after the Football League was formed in 1888 the Football League decided to introduce the retain-and-transfer system, which restricted clubs from luring players from other clubs, thereby preventing clubs from losing their players and preventing the league from being dominated by a handful of rich clubs. From the start of the 1893–94 season onwards, once a player was registered with a Football League club, he could not be registered with any other club, even in subsequent seasons, without the permission of the club he was registered with. It applied even if the player's annual contract with the club holding their registration was not renewed after it expired. The club was not obliged to play them and, without a contract, the player was not entitled to receive a salary. Nevertheless, if the club refused to release his registration, the player could not play for any other Football League club. Football League clubs soon began to demand and earn a transfer fee from any other Football League club as consideration for agreeing to release or transfer the player's registration.

In 1912 Charles Sutcliffe helped establish the legality of this retain-and-transfer system when he successfully represented his club Aston Villa during the Kingaby case. The former Villa player Herbert Kingaby had brought legal proceedings against the club for preventing him from playing. However an erroneous strategy pursued by Kingaby's counsel resulted in the suit being dismissed. In England, the "retain" aspect of the system was removed after a decision by the High Court in 1963 in Eastham v Newcastle United that it was unreasonable.

=== 1995: Bosman ruling ===
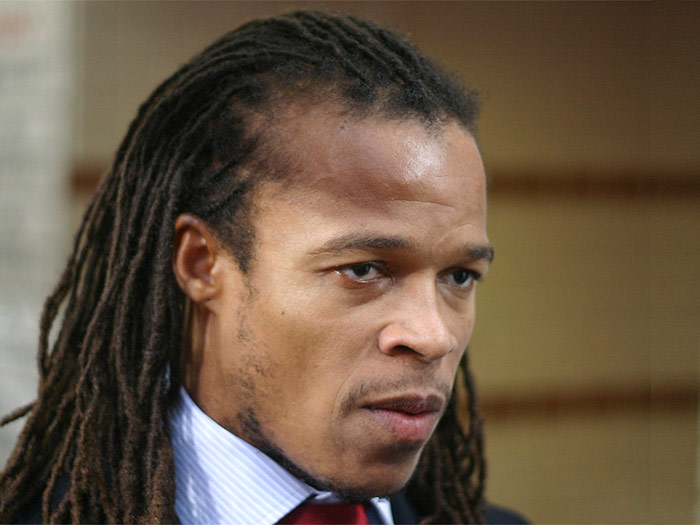
In 1996, Dutchman Edgar Davids was the first high-profile player to move on a free transfer via the Bosman ruling.

The transfer system remained unchanged until the Bosman ruling. The ruling is named after Jean-Marc Bosman, a former Belgian footballer who in 1990 was registered with Belgian Cup winners RFC Liège. His contract had expired and he was looking to move to French team Dunkerque, but Dunkerque refused to pay the transfer fee of £500,000 that Liège were asking for. Bosman was left in limbo and his wages were cut by 75% due to him not playing. After a lengthy legal battle, Bosman won his case on 15 December 1995 when the European Court of Justice ruled players should legally be free to move when their contract expired.

The first high-profile "Bosman transfer" was Edgar Davids, who departed Ajax for Milan, but lasted just one year in Milan before moving to league rivals Juventus for a fee of over £5 million. The same summer, Luis Enrique made the controversial decision to let his Real Madrid contract run down by signing for league rivals Barcelona. In 1999, Steve McManaman departed his boyhood club Liverpool for Real Madrid, while Sol Campbell was arguably the most controversial Bosman transfer of all-time when in 2001, he moved from Tottenham Hotspur to local fierce rivals Arsenal. In 2011, playmaker Andrea Pirlo notably completed his contract with Milan before moving to Juventus. In 2014, it was announced Borussia Dortmund striker Robert Lewandowski would leave the club for league rivals Bayern Munich in the upcoming summer when his contract expired.

"I think I did something very good. I gave people rights. Now I think there may be a new generation of players who don't realise how lucky they are to be able to leave a club and join another, even if they are the fifth or sixth foreigner there. I am proud of the ruling because people will still be talking about it in years to come, maybe even after I am gone in 20 or 30 years or whatever. Maybe they will think they should at least thank me, nothing more."

— Jean-Marc Bosman in 2015.

Another impact the case had was the rules regarding foreign players. Before the ruling was made, clubs throughout Europe were limited to the number of foreign players they could employ, and could only play a maximum of three in European competition. FIFA noted it was "disappointed" in the ruling, while Gordon Taylor thought the decision would have a major impact and would "lead to a flood of foreign players... to the detriment of our game". The ruling ensured a team could now choose to play a team of 11 foreign players if it wanted, as was the case when Chelsea became the first team to do so in December 1999. By 2007, the percentage of foreign players in England and Germany had reached 57%, compared with 39% in Spain and France and 30% in Italy. The last team to field an all-English starting line-up was Aston Villa in February 1999, nine months before the first all-foreign squad fielded by a club team in a football match.

=== 2002: Transfer window created ===
Although there were leagues already implementing the practice, UEFA decided to enforce a continental transfer window in time for the 2002–03 season. UEFA chief executive Gerhard Aigner said that part of the reason behind making the transfer window compulsory was to ensure a partial stabilisation of club squads during the season and to "stop the confusion that has followed Bosman", and, with regards to it possibly damaging smaller clubs financially, he said it did not make sense that clubs would "depend on the transfer of a single player to survive the season". Since 2002, most leagues around Europe have two windows in which players may be purchased: the end of the season to 31 August, and then for the entirety of the month of January. In England, the club chairmen felt they were "reluctantly being forced" to accept the proposal, and FIFA eventually relaxed the rules regarding out-of-contract players, which enabled them to sign a contract with a new club at any time, thus not depriving football players of income outside of the season's transfer window.

=== 2003: Loan laws updated ===
In 2003, the English Premier League scrapped a law which forbade loans between clubs in the league. Professional Footballers' Association chairman Gordon Taylor was critical of the change, fearing the new system would "erode the sporting and competitive element of the game". In February 2004, Newcastle United allowed striker Lomana LuaLua to move on loan to fellow Premier League club Portsmouth for three months for a £100,000 fee. On 29 February, LuaLua scored an 89th-minute equaliser against Newcastle in a 1–1 draw, later apologizing to Newcastle supporters. The law was again changed to block players from playing against their parent club, a move which Graham Taylor was critical of. Long-time Arsenal manager Arsène Wenger has been critical of the rule on numerous occasions. In 2012, he asked for the rules to be changed so that only players aged 21 and under can be loaned; in 2013, he said the rule lacks "integrity"; and in 2014, said the system was "not defendable" and protects the clubs who loan players out. In 2013, Football League clubs voted unanimously to close a "ludicrous" loophole which had allowed Watford to loan 14 players from abroad, including ten from Udinese.

=== 2006–2014: Third-party ownership controversy ===
On transfer deadline day in August 2006, West Ham United pulled off what was described as a "major coup" by signing Argentina World Cup stars Carlos Tevez and Javier Mascherano from Corinthians. West Ham's official press release stated Tevez and Mascherano had "been signed for an undisclosed fee and put pen to paper on permanent contracts", but that "all other aspects of the transfers will remain confidential and undisclosed". Mystery shrouded the transfer immediately with regards to who owned the rights to the players, and continued until three years later when Tevez signed for Manchester United. In March 2007, West Ham were charged over the transfers, with the Premier League claiming the club had breached two regulations, U6 and U18, which state respectively, "No person may either directly or indirectly be involved in or have any power to determine or influence the management or administration of more than one club," and, "No club shall enter into a contract which enables any other party to that contract to require the ability materially to influence its policies or the performance of its teams in league matches." West Ham escaped a points deduction, but were given a record fine of £5.5 million by the Premier League. Tevez was also cleared to carry on playing for the club, and he scored the goal on the final matchday of the season, which kept West Ham in the Premier League. Sheffield United, who were relegated from the Premier League at the end of the season, sued West Ham and eventually received a settlement of approximately £20 million.

Mascherano agreed to leave West Ham to join Liverpool on loan in January 2007, but had to wait for the Premier League to ratify the transfer due to the previous controversy, and the transfer was cleared three weeks later. On 29 February 2008, Liverpool signed Mascherano on a four-year contract, with a fee of £18 million paid to agent Kia Joorabchian. After Joorabchian had paid £2 million to West Ham, Tevez departed for Manchester United at the end of the season on a two-year loan, with United paying £5 million per year. After the loan ended, Tevez transferred to United's rivals Manchester City for a reported fee of £47 million.

In 2008, the Premier League banned third-party ownership in England, and in 2012, then-UEFA president Michel Platini released a statement in which plans to ban third-party ownership were revealed, stating that "the committee decided that the ownership of football players by third parties should be prohibited as a matter of principle", while then UEFA general secretary Gianni Infantino said, "Third-party ownership of players bears many threats and there are many issues linked with the integrity of the competition and it is really time to regulate that and to have a stance on that." In 2014, Platini again called for the practice to end: "If FIFA fails to act, we will address this issue in our own competitions in Europe. The UEFA Executive Committee has already adopted a position on this issue in principle, and we will see this through," also adding it is a "danger to our sport" and "threatens the integrity of our competitions, damages football's image, poses a long-term threat to clubs' finances and even raises questions about human dignity". He was backed by FIFPro, the worldwide representative organisation for 65,000 professional football players, who stated the rights of the players were "under attack". In September 2014, it was announced by then-FIFA president Sepp Blatter that third-party ownership was to be banned completely following an indeterminate transitional period.

=== 2006: Webster ruling ===
In April 2006, Heart of Midlothian player Andy Webster was placed on the transfer list by the club after Webster's agent attempted to engineer a move to Rangers. In late June, club owner Vladimir Romanov confirmed that Webster, as well as teammate Rudi Skácel, were in talks to agree a move to Southampton. Days later, Romanov reported the pair to FIFA after the players failed to turn up at the airport to fly to Austria for pre-season training. Later in the month, Webster invoked a new ruling in the FIFA laws which allowed players to free themselves from their contract and join a club in another country, providing they were in the third year of a four-year contract and gave his current club due notice, and was set to sign for Wigan Athletic. In September, the transfer was finally ratified by FIFA. despite a late attempt by Hearts to re-sign Webster. However, after playing just five matches for Wigan, he moved to Rangers on loan in January 2007 and was given permission to play following a complaint by Hearts. In May 2007, the tribunal to decide the compensation due to Hearts took place, with Hearts seeking up to £5 million, but were eventually rewarded just £625,000. Scottish Professional Footballers' Association Fraser Wishart described the ruling as a "landmark". In January 2008, after an appeal, the compensation fee was reduced to £150,000 by the Court of Arbitration for Sport (CAS). In 2007, Matuzalém invoked the same clause as Webster to break out of his contract with Shakhtar Donetsk, signing for Real Zaragoza. Matuzalém was found to be in breach of contract, and he and Zaragoza were ordered to pay £11 million in compensation to Shakhtar.

=== 2013: Transfer of Neymar from Santos to Barcelona ===
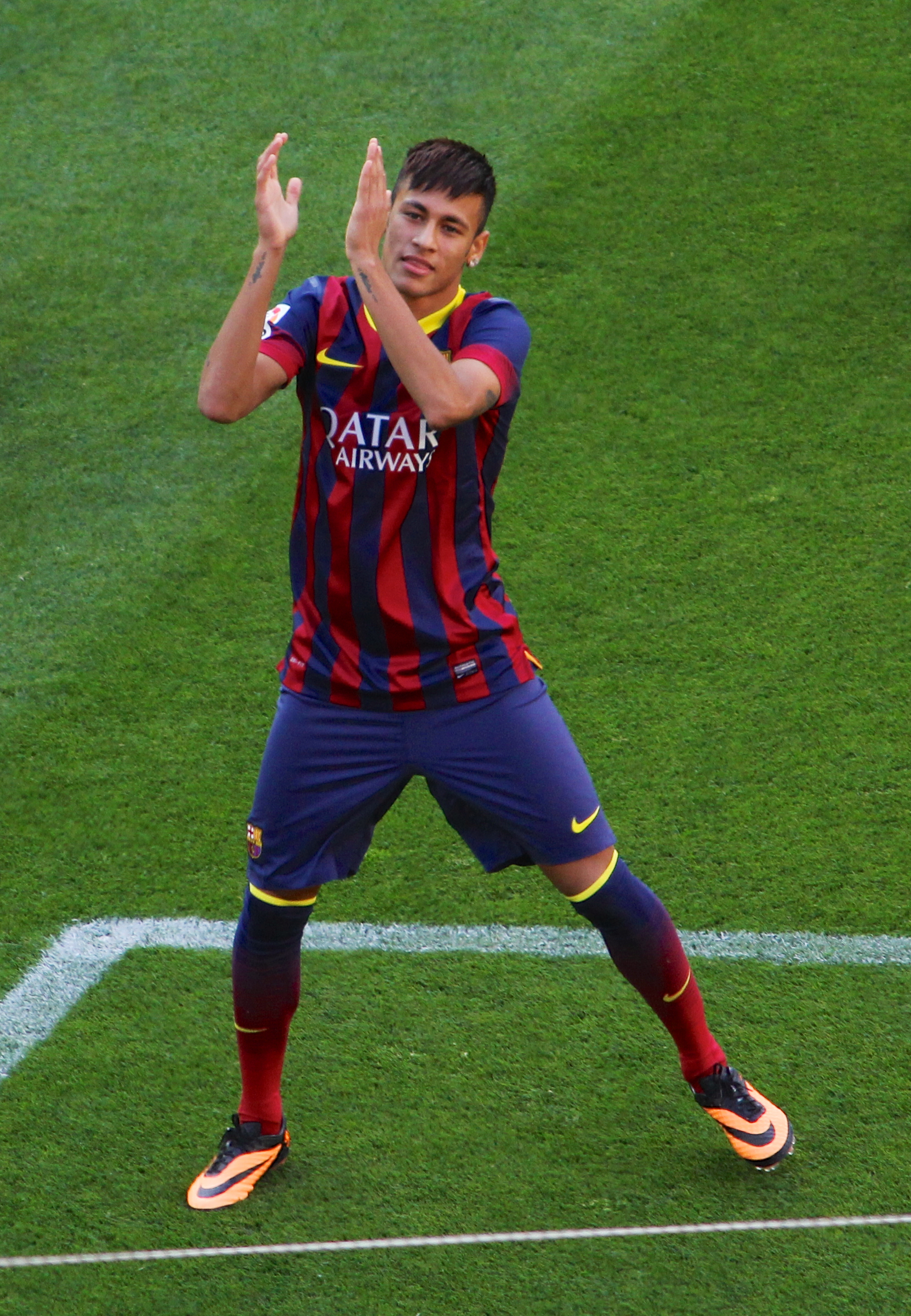
Neymar's transfer to Barcelona in 2013 became the subject of investigation.

In August 2010, Brazilian team Santos' 18-year-old homegrown striker Neymar was the subject of a bid in the region of £25 million from English team Chelsea, before he signed a new five-year contract. In June 2011, Neymar was again the subject of a high-profile transfer bids: Chelsea and Real Madrid were both reported as preparing offers of €45 million, before Neymar eventually turned them down to sign another new contract with Santos. In December 2011, ahead of the 2011 FIFA Club World Cup Final, it was reported that Barcelona had paid Santos a €10 million instalment for the guaranteed future transfer of Neymar at any point until 2014.

A similar figure of €14 million was reported in March by Spanish radio station Cadena SER, which also reported a total transfer fee of €58 million had already been agreed between the two clubs. Neymar's father was quoted as saying Barcelona was a "great option" for his son. A year later, his father again spoke of a possible transfer for his son, saying he would leave Santos after the 2014 FIFA World Cup, taking place in Brazil, and that Barcelona was the "best path". The manager of the Brazil national team at the time, Mano Menezes, thought a move to Europe before the World Cup would be the best way for Neymar to develop as a player ahead of the tournament, while Neymar himself said, "I'm saying once and for all that I'm not leaving Santos right now."

On 25 May 2013, Barcelona announced they had agreed a deal with Santos to sign Neymar, who himself released a statement shortly afterwards, saying, "I am not going to wait until Monday. My family and friends now know my decision. On Monday I will sign with Barcelona." The transfer was confirmed on 3 June, with Neymar signing a five-year contract with Barcelona for a fee reported as £48.6 million, a fee later confirmed by Barcelona vice-president Josep Maria Bartomeu. Shortly after the transfer was confirmed, DIS Esporte executive director Roberto Moreno revealed that DIS had not been paid a proportionate amount that equalled their 40% stake in the player; the investors of DIS had been paid only €9.7 million, which Moreno said meant the transfer fee Santos received was just €17 million.

Moreno threatened legal action to those privy to the inside knowledge of the transfer deal, saying, "I am going to wait one more week and then I will open a case in court to get access to the information." The legal action was pursued, forcing Santos to produce a document as evidence in which they claimed, "As Santos FC well knows, the total transfer fee for all the federative and economic rights of Neymar Jr was established at €17.1M as stated in the transfer contract signed by both clubs," and they denied any wrongdoing with regards to payments to third parties, stating, "Such amounts... will be shared among Santos FC, TEISA and DIS in the amounts contractually agreed between these entities." Barcelona also paid Santos a fee of €7.9 million for "preferential rights" for three other Santos players, which Bartomeu claimed was not part of the transfer fee.

In December, Barcelona club member Jordi Cases took the case to court in an attempt to prove "misappropriation of funds", claiming the total fee Barcelona paid was actually €74 million. In January, Barcelona released a statement in which they denied any wrongdoing, citing they had disclosed the €40 million payment to Neymar's parents from the beginning. On 22 January, it was announced that judge Pablo Ruz would gather information as part of a lawsuit against Barcelona president Sandro Rosell. Rosell resigned from his position as president the next day, and a day later, the details of the transfer were revealed by Barcelona; the transfer had in fact cost them a total of €57.1 million (£48.6M), with Neymar's parents confirmed to have received a €40 million sum.

On 20 February, Barcelona and Bartomeu were charged with tax fraud, and paid a "voluntary" amount of €13.6 million in the same week in an attempt to save the image of the club. Barcelona continued to defend their actions, releasing a statement stating that the club's "dealings with respect to this operation, and in light of all information available, was at all times in line with the relevant legal legislation", while Neymar defended his father's rights to the money he received as part of the deal. Bartomeu, who had been appointed club president following Rosell's resignation, reiterated the belief of himself and the club that the deal was fair and praised the transparency of the club to reveal all the details. The tax charges which had been brought against Bartomeu were dropped in September.

=== 2013: FIFPro legal challenge ===
In 2013, FIFPro launched a legal challenge against the transfer system. FIFPro president Phillipe Piat said that "the transfer system fails 99% of players around the world, it fails football as an industry and it fails the world's most beloved game". According to FIFPro's European president Bobby Barnes, 28% of the money from a transfer fee is paid to agents, and that many players are not paid on time or at all. He claims this leads to these players being "vulnerable targets of crime syndicates, who instigate match-fixing and threaten the very existence of credible football competitions". Writing for the BBC, Matt Slater said that "professional footballers do not enjoy the same freedoms that almost every other EU worker does", and that "players look at US sport, and wonder why their career prospects are still constrained by transfer fees and compensation costs". Barnes argues that "the system encourages speculative, unsustainable, immoral and illegal investment models like third-party ownership of players". In 2017, FIFPro agreed to drop the legal challenge after they came to an understanding with FIFA, signing a six-year agreement to improve governance of transfers and conduct a review of the current system. Under the new terms, players who are unpaid by their parent club, mistreated or subject to abusive behaviour, are free to break their contract and leave.

=== 2014: Co-ownership ends ===
In May 2014, the Italian Football Federation (FIGC) announced it would be ending co-ownership of players to bring Serie A in line with the other European leagues.

== Medical examination ==
Players will commonly undergo a medical examination and/or physical fitness test before a transfer can be completed. Occasionally, previously unknown medical problems will be detected, potentially jeopardizing the transfer or the size of the fee. Rarely, a player will still be signed by the interested club even if he fails a medical, as happened when Dominic Matteo failed a medical ahead of his move from Liverpool to Leeds United, who spent £4.75 million on Matteo. According to footballer Shaun Derry, his first medical was as basic as him bending over to touch his toes to check the stability in his knees, but, as the knowledge of sports science has evolved, the medical now involves MRI scans, and, according to former Nottingham Forest physiotherapist Gary Fleming, ECGs are also performed to check for any problems with the heart. The person performing the medical will check all the major joints, ligaments and the player's sight. A player can fail a medical simply by being unfit, as was the case when Inter Milan tried to sign John Carew.

=== Failed medicals ===
One of the earliest, and most high profile, example of a transfer being cancelled due to medical issues in the UK was in November 1971 when Asa Hartford's transfer to Leeds United from West Bromwich Albion collapsed. Amidst a high level of publicity, the two clubs had agreed a fee of £177,000, a then record for Leeds United; but a medical examination found Hartford had a pin-sized hole in his heart, a slight defect he had been born with but had never impacted the progression of his career. On the advice of their medical staff, Leeds United cancelled the transfer. Despite this, Hartford went on to have a long successful playing career, including appearing for Scotland in the 1978 and 1982 World Cups, with his minor heart defect never causing an issue.

In the summer of 2000, Ruud van Nistelrooy looked set to complete a club record £18.5 million transfer to Manchester United from PSV. Van Nistelrooy was to be unveiled at a press conference four days later, but instead this was used to announce the transfer had been postponed over concerns about his fitness; he had not played for a month due to problems with his knee. The transfer was then cancelled after PSV would not agree to further medical tests, and the next day, he ruptured his anterior cruciate ligament (ACL) in his knee during a training session, leaving him injured for a year. One year later, Van Nistelrooy signed a five-year contract after passing his medical.

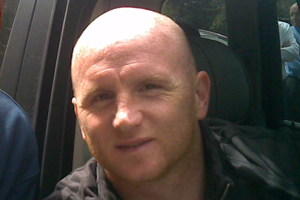
John Hartson failed medical tests which led to the shelving of three potential transfers in 2000.

Throughout 2000, Wimbledon striker John Hartson's proposed multimillion-pound moves to Tottenham Hotspur, Rangers and Charlton Athletic all fell through after he failed medicals at each club. In February 2001, Hartson finally transferred to Coventry City. In July 2003, Gabriel Milito's transfer to Real Madrid from Independiente was cancelled after the medical examination by the Spanish club. Real Madrid doctors said Milito's knees would suffer severe injuries in the incoming years. Milito then signed with Real Zaragoza, becoming one of the most successful defenders in La Liga. In the incoming season, Zaragoza went to win the Copa del Rey final against Real Madrid. In 2007, he joined Real Madrid's rivals, Barcelona, but at the end of his first season he suffered a knee injury that ruled him out for two years.

In 2008, Lilian Thuram agreed to sign for Paris Saint-Germain on a free transfer from Barcelona. During his medical, it was discovered he had a severe heart defect which had also ended his brother's life, forcing Thuram to retire. In 2009, Milan were set to sign Aly Cissokho from Porto when a medical revealed he had a dental problem which could cause deterioration in posture and potential muscle problems, prompting Milan to cancel the transfer. Cissokho eventually transferred to Lyon one month later. On transfer deadline in January 2013, Nottingham Forest were attempting to sign George Boyd from Peterborough United when it collapsed due to an inconclusive eye test. Boyd later signed for Hull City in February, and subsequently scored against Forest in a fixture in March and mocked them with a celebration whereby he used his fingers to make fake glasses. A permanent transfer was arranged in May.

== Highest fees ==
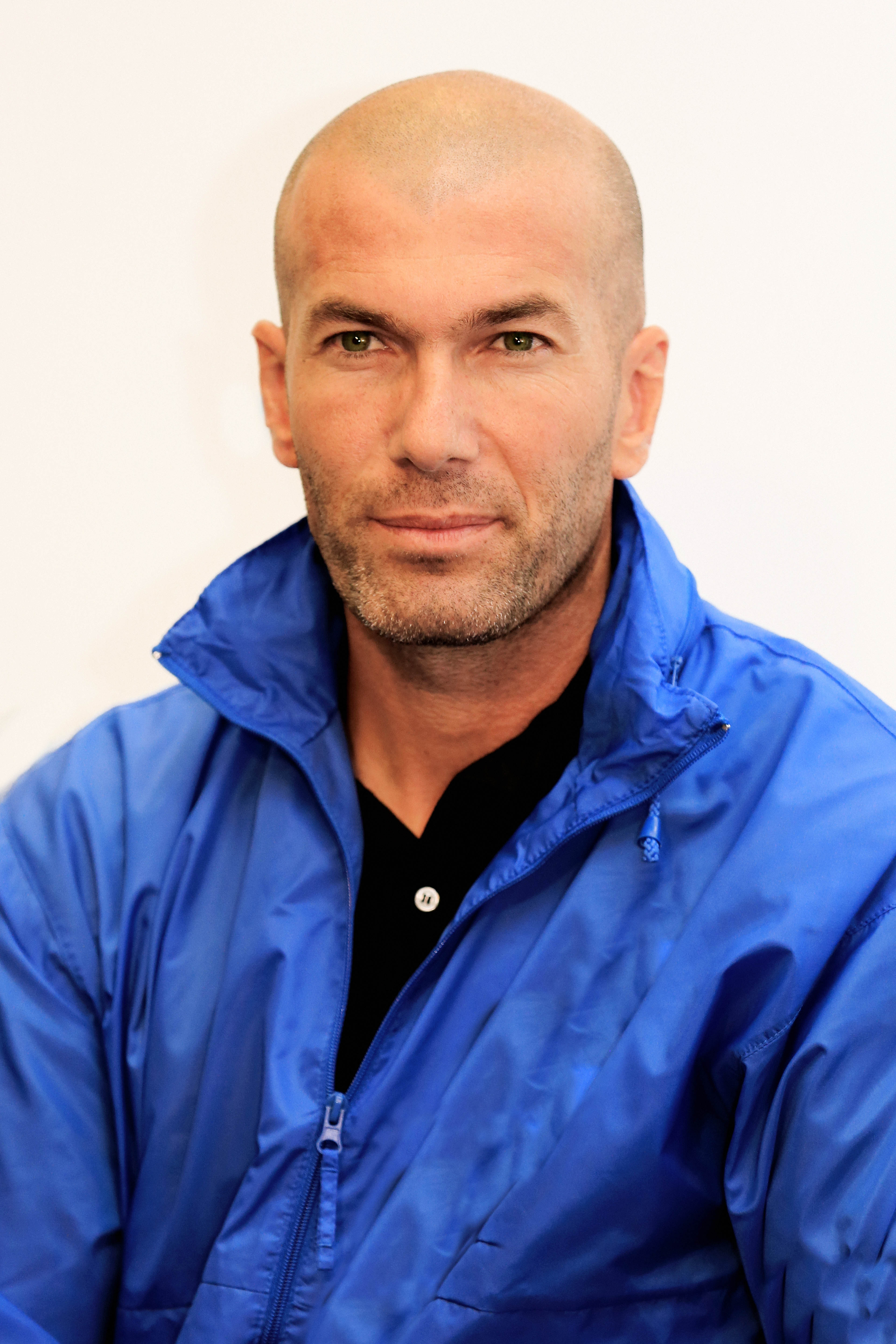
Zinedine Zidane was the most expensive player in the world for eight years.

The first player to ever be transferred for a fee of over £100 was Scottish striker Willie Groves when he made the switch from West Bromwich Albion to Aston Villa in 1893, eight years after the legalisation of professionalism in the sport. It took just 12 years for the figure to become £1,000, when Sunderland striker Alf Common moved to Middlesbrough. It was not until 1928 that the first five-figure transfer took place. David Jack of Bolton Wanderers was the subject of interest from Arsenal, and in order to negotiate the fee down, Arsenal manager Herbert Chapman got the Bolton representatives drunk. Arsenal paid £10,890 after Bolton had asked for £13,000, which was double the previous record made when Sunderland signed Burnley's Bob Kelly a fee of for £6,500.

The first player from outside Great Britain to break the record was Bernabé Ferreyra, a player known as "La Fiera" for his powerful shot. His 1932 transfer from Tigre to River Plate cost £23,000, and the record would last for 17 years (the longest the record has lasted) until it was broken by Manchester United's sale of Johnny Morris to Derby County for £24,000 in March 1949. The record was broken seven further times between 1949 and 1961, when Luis Suárez was sold by Barcelona to Inter Milan for £152,000, becoming the first ever player sold for more than £100,000. In 1968, Pietro Anastasi became the first £500,000 player when Juventus purchased him from Varese, which was followed seven years later with Giuseppe Savoldi becoming the first million pound player when he transferred from Bologna to Napoli.

In English football, the first £1 million fee occurred in 1979, when Nottingham Forest signed striker Trevor Francis from Birmingham City. Later in the same year, the English record fee was broken twice, with fees of close to £1.5 million being paid by Manchester City to Wolverhampton Wanderers for Steve Daley, and by Wolverhampton Wanderers to Aston Villa for Andy Gray. This was during a time when transfer fees were rapidly growing in English football, and the £1.5 million mark was finally reached in 1981 when Manchester United signed Bryan Robson from West Bromwich Albion. However, a change in transfer regulations around this time meant that all fees had to be paid in full within 12 months of the transfer being completed, and at least half of the fee had to be paid when the transfer was first finalised. Consequently, Robson's record fee remained intact for six years, when Liverpool signed Peter Beardsley from Newcastle United for £1.9 million. However, fees well in excess of £2 million had already been paid to English clubs by Barcelona, who had signed Mark Hughes from Manchester United and Gary Lineker from Everton in 1986. At this time, the highest transfer fees were mostly paid by Italian and Spanish clubs. Juventus paid Liverpool more than £3 million for Ian Rush.

The first £2 million fee paid by an English club came in the summer of 1988, when Tottenham Hotspur signed Paul Gascoigne from Newcastle United. Within weeks of Gascoigne's transfer, the national record was broken again when Tony Cottee moved from West Ham United to Everton for £2.2 million, and again shortly afterwards when Ian Rush returned to Liverpool from Juventus for £2.8 million. In the space of two months in the summer of 1992, three transfers broke the record, all by Italian clubs: Jean-Pierre Papin transferred from Marseille to Milan, becoming the world's first ever £10 million player. Almost immediately, rivals Juventus topped that with the signing of Gianluca Vialli for a fee of £12 million from Sampdoria. Milan then completed the signing of Gianluigi Lentini for a fee of £13 million, which stood as the record for three years. In contrast, the English record fee that year was set at £3.6 million Alan Shearer moved to Blackburn Rovers from Southampton, a decade after the world's first £3 million transfer.

Lentini's transfer remained intact the world record fee for the next four years, although the national record was broken more than once in many countries including England. Shearer's £3.6million record fee was narrowly eclipsed 12 months later when Manchester United signed Roy Keane from Nottingham Forest for £3.75 million. In 1994, Blackburn Rovers paid a record £5 million for Chris Sutton from Norwich City, a decade after the world's first £5 million transfer. Then, in 1995, the national record fee was broken three times in six months – first when Andy Cole joined Manchester United from Newcastle United for £7 million, then with Arsenal's £7.5 million move for Dutch striker Dennis Bergkamp from Inter Milan, and finally with Liverpool's £8.5 million move for Nottingham Forest's Stan Collymore.

The 1996 transfer of Shearer from Blackburn Rovers to Newcastle United, for a fee of £15 million, kickstarted a year-by-year succession of global record breaking transfers, as well as being the first time in decades that an English club had broken the world record for a transfer fee. It also reflected the rapid rise in English transfer fees since the creation of the Premier League in 1992. Five years earlier, a year before the new league's creation, the national record fee had stood at £2.9 million. Even Collymore's transfer 12 months before Shearer's was little more than half of the money paid for the latest record-breaking transfer.

Ronaldo moved the following year to Inter Milan from Barcelona for a fee of £17 million, which was followed in 1998 by the shock transfer of his fellow countryman Denílson from São Paulo of Brazil to Real Betis of Spain for a fee of approximately £21 million. In 1999 and 2000, Italian clubs returned to their record-breaking ways, with Christian Vieri transferring from Lazio to Inter for £28 million, while Hernán Crespo's transfer from Parma to Lazio ensured he became the first player to cost more than £30 million. The transfer of Vieri led to the suicide of a Lazio fan, who wrote in his suicide note, "All that money for a footballer, but money is not everything in life," while the Crespo transfer prompted the BBC to ask, "[H]as the world gone mad?"

Although Shearer's status as the world's most expensive footballer would only last for one year, he remained unmatched as the most expensive footballer in England for four years, when Chelsea signed the Dutch striker Jimmy Floyd Hasselbaink for £15 million. Later that year, Shearer's record was finally eclipsed when Leeds United paid £18 million for West Ham United's Rio Ferdinand. In the summer of 2001, the English record was broken twice in the space of a few weeks, both times by Manchester United, who first signed Dutch striker Ruud van Nistelrooy for £19 million, and then signed Argentine midfielder Juan Sebastián Verón for £28.1 million. A year later, they broke the English record fee again by signing Rio Ferdinand from Leeds United for a fee in the region of £29 million, 11 years after Liverpool had paid a mere tenth of that figure to set an English record transfer fee when they signed Dean Saunders.

It took two weeks for the record to be broken when Luís Figo made a controversial £37 million move from Barcelona to fierce rivals Real Madrid. From that time through the 2015–16 season, Real Madrid held the record, with the next players to subsequently break the record being Zinedine Zidane in 2001 when he signed for £46 million from Juventus, Kaká from Milan for just under £60 million in 2009, and £80 million transfer of Cristiano Ronaldo from Manchester United in the same year, lastly being Gareth Bale in 2013, who became the first player to cost €100 million when he transferred from Tottenham Hotspur. Manchester United claimed the record in 2016 when they spent €105 million for Paul Pogba, who returned to the club after four seasons at Juventus. This record was broken in 2017 when Paris Saint-Germain spent €222 million to sign Neymar from Barcelona.

There have been occasions when a world-record bid has been made but the transfer was never completed. In 2003, shortly after Roman Abramovich had taken over Chelsea, the club made a bid of £71.4 million (€101.5M) for Real Madrid's Raúl, which was rejected, and in 2009, shortly having been taken over by Mansour bin Zayed Al Nahyan, Manchester City made a bid of £100 million (€111M) for Milan's Kaká. The bid was accepted, but after deliberating over the move for a week, Kaká turned down the transfer despite being offered weekly wages of £500,000.

The sharp rise in transfer fees since the 1990s, and in particular into the third millennium, has been attributed primarily to a large rise in television rights fees and sponsorship. For example, in 2013, new broadcaster BT Sport announced they had agreed to pay £897 million over a three-year period to gain exclusive broadcast rights to the UEFA Champions League and UEFA Europa League. Transfer fees are not always officially confirmed by the transacting clubs, and figures published by unofficial sources may or may not take into account various fees such as those paid to agents or a third party, performance-related elements of the fee, and the notional value of any players included in part exchange. This leads to different figures being given by different sources. Performance-related clauses have become more common in recent years, meaning that it is harder to produce definitive lists of the largest transfer fees than was the case in the past. For example, the 2004 transfer of Wayne Rooney from Everton to Manchester United cost an initial fee of £20 million that rose to £27 million due to the number of appearances he made and the number of trophies he won with the club.

The following tables show the highest transfer fees ever paid in euro for players and managers. The first features the top 20 most expensive transfers involving players, and contains eight transfers which broke the world transfer record: those of Neymar in 2017, Paul Pogba, Gareth Bale, Cristiano Ronaldo, Zinedine Zidane, Luís Figo and Hernán Crespo all broke the record. The second list shows the top 20 most expensive transfers involving managers. When a manager moves from one club to another, it usually involves a small figure of compensation being paid, and the figure is rarely released publicly. Because of this, there have only been 20 managers who have ever cost more than £1 million in compensation, as detailed in the table.

=== Players ===
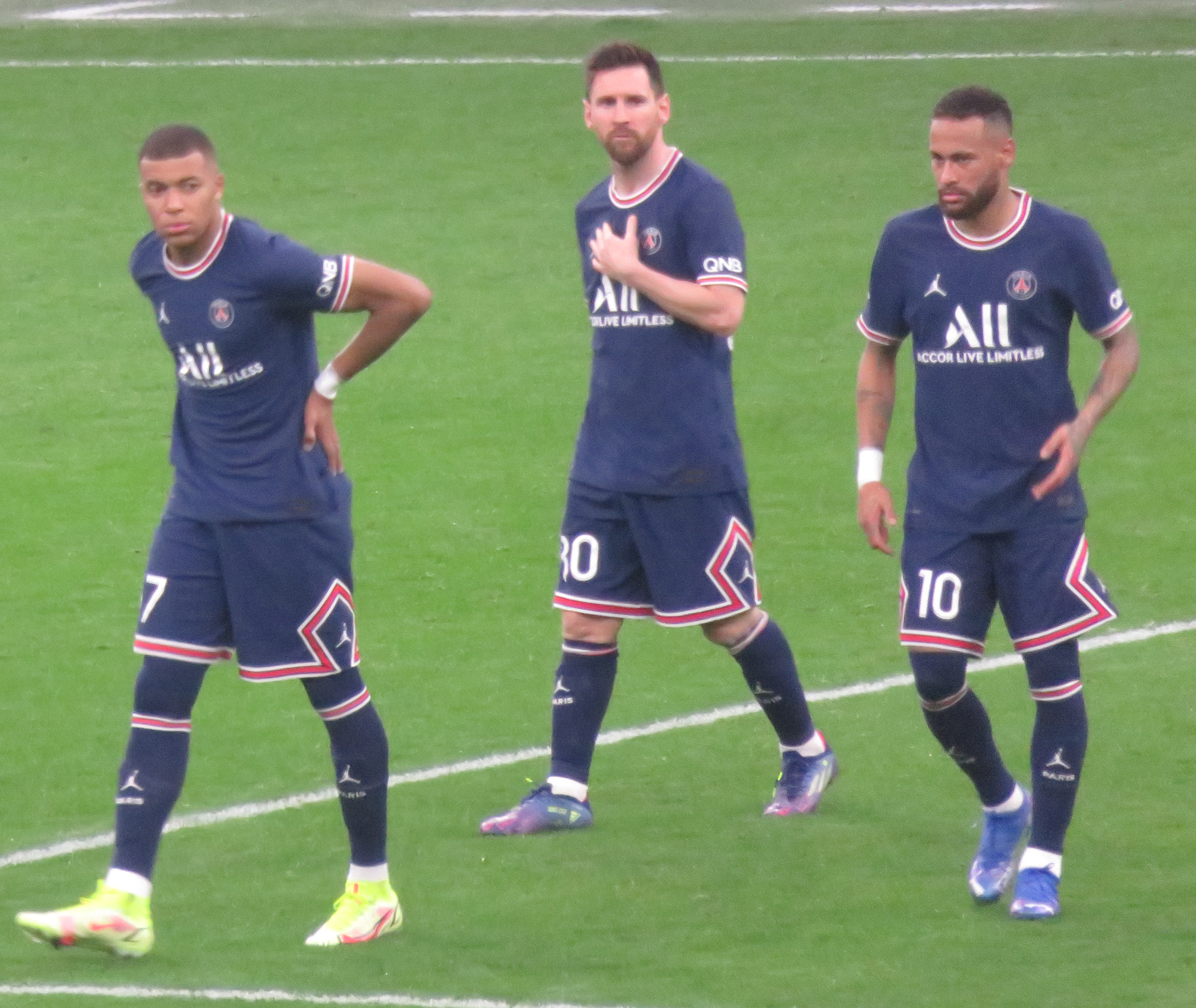
Neymar (right) and Kylian Mbappé (left) are the two most expensive association football transfers.

Due to fluctuations in exchange rates lists of the most expensive transfers vary depending on the currency used. Most high-priced transfers take place between clubs in the Eurozone and/or the United Kingdom. Fees are often not officially announced, and figures reported by the media may not necessarily be accurate.

- List of most expensive association football transfers
- List of most expensive women's association football transfers

=== Managers ===
For football managers, the list is as follows:

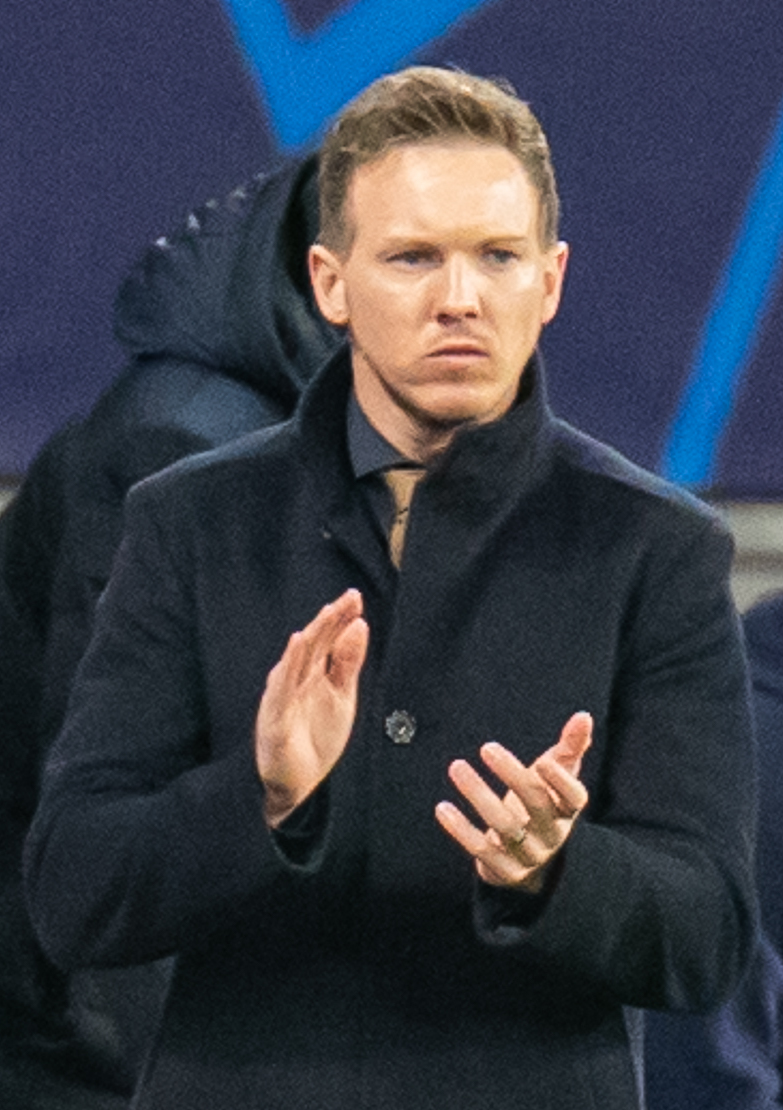
Julian Nagelsmann was purchased by Bayern Munich from RB Leipzig for a world record-breaking fee of €25 Million in 2021.

| Rank | Coach | From | To | Transfer fee (£ million) | Transfer fee (€ million) | Year |
|---|---|---|---|---|---|---|
| 1 | (Germany) Julian Nagelsmann | (Germany) RB Leipzig | (Germany) Bayern Munich | £21.7 | €25 | 2021 |
| 2 | (England) Graham Potter | (England) Brighton & Hove Albion | (England) Chelsea | £20 | €23 | 2022 |
| 3 | (Italy) Enzo Maresca (1) | (England) Chelsea | (England) Manchester City | £17 | €19.7 | 2026 |
| 4 | (Portugal) André Villas-Boas | (Portugal) Porto | (England) Chelsea | £13.3 | €15 | 2011 |
| 5 | (Portugal) Jose Mourinho | (Portugal) Benfica | (Spain) Real Madrid | £12.9 | €15 | 2026 |
| 6 | (Belgium) Vincent Kompany | (England) Burnley | (Germany) Bayern Munich | £10.2 | €12 | 2024 |
| 7 | (Denmark) Thomas Frank | (England) Brentford | (England) Tottenham Hotspur | £10 | €11.88 | 2025 |
| 8 | (Italy) Enzo Maresca (2) | (England) Leicester City | (England) Chelsea | £10 | €11.75 | 2024 |
| 9 | (Germany) Matthias Jaissle | (Saudi Arabia) Al-Ahli | (England) Newcastle United | £9.5 | €11.1 | 2026 |
| 10 | (Netherlands) Arne Slot | (Netherlands) Feyenoord | (England) Liverpool | £9.4 | €11 | 2024 |
| 11 | (Portugal) Ruben Amorim | (Portugal) Sporting CP | (England) Manchester United | £9.25 | €11 | 2024 |

== Other types of transfers ==
As well as this type of regular transfer, which results in the player being "owned" by one club, other forms of transfer are used throughout South America and southern Europe.

=== Pre-contract ===
A pre-contract is an agreement by a player and an agreeing to take his registration at a later date, and became more well known after the Bosman ruling in 1995. A club may sign a pre-contract with a player while he is still with another club, by which the player agrees to move to the club at a future date, usually after his contract with his current club expires. Under the Bosman ruling, a player can sign a contract with a new club up to six months before his existing contract expires.

A pre-contract agreement may be broken by the player or the club, depending on the completeness of the terms of that pre-contract and thus how close it was to being considered a valid contract under local law. In the 2014 case of Beijing Renhe FC v. Marcin Robak, the player met with the Chinese club's owner, agreed on length and compensation, put those in writing, received a signed copy of both the transfer agreement from his current club and his employment contract, and then Beijing Renhe FC retracted the agreement while saying they couldn't finalize transfer terms with his departing club.

FIFA's Dispute Resolution body ruled that due to the extensive provisions and signatures on the exchanged documents, a legally binding contract had been entered into, and awarded €330,000 to Robak in compensation. On appeal, CAS upheld the award but further ruled that because of the tentative nature or omission of some common contract provisions, it was in fact a pre-contract, subject to lower damages (while still obliging all sides to resolve final contract terms in good faith, which the acquiring club had not done). In another case, Ross County midfielder Richard Brittain signed a pre-contract with St Johnstone. The agreement was made in January 2013, but Brittain changed his mind three months later, citing family reasons. Ross County registered the player as their own in June, and, after discussions with the Scottish FA, St Johnstone and Ross County came to an agreement to let Brittain stay at the club, with St Johnstone cancelling the pre-contract agreement if Ross County paid compensation.

Although a pre-contract agreement is usually signed to secure the future registration of a player, an agreement can be reached where the club gaining the registration can pay a fee to the other club to sign the player earlier, as was the case in January 2013, when Schalke 04 midfielder Lewis Holtby, who had six months remaining on his contract, signed a pre-contract agreement with Tottenham Hotspur, but at the end of the month, Tottenham paid a fee of £1.5 million to bring the transfer forward.

=== Co-ownership ===
Co-ownership is a system whereby a club will purchase 50% of the rights of a player's contract for one year and pay the wages, while also deciding which of the two clubs he will play for. At the end of the year, both clubs can choose to place a bid in an auction, where the highest bid wins. The co-ownership of Alessio Cerci by Torino and Fiorentina proved fruitful for Cerci and Torino, who had paid €2.5 million for the first 50%, and picked up the remainder of his contract after a successful year for just €3.8 million. In May 2014, the Italian Football Federation (FIGC) announced it would be ending co-ownership of players to bring Serie A in line with every other league around Europe. The existing ownership deals could be for a year and at the end of it the player and the club must reach an agreement.

=== Third-party ownership ===
Third party ownership is ownership of a player's economic rights by third-party sources, such as football agents, sports-management agencies, or other investors. The involvement of investors in the "ownership" of players is a common practice in football, particularly in Brazil and Argentina, where many clubs are insolvent or financially limited. Businessmen or other investors buy shares in the economic rights of young players and often cover the costs of their training and accommodation. In return they are entitled to a percentage of a player's future transfer fee. The transfer of Carlos Tevez to Manchester City for £47 million in 2009 was controversial for the part played by third-party owner Media Sports Investment (MSI).

== Loan and other transfer-related clauses ==
=== Loan ===
An alternative or an intermediary of a transfer, is a loan. This is where a player is allowed to temporarily play for a club other than the one he is currently contracted to. Loan deals may last from a few weeks to all season-long and can also last for a few seasons. Rarely, a loan of a player can be included in the transfer of another player; for example, the transfer of Dimitar Berbatov from Tottenham Hotspur to Manchester United for £31 million in 2008 included the loan of Fraizer Campbell in the opposite direction.

Loans often require loanee clubs to pay the loaning club a loan fee for the privilege of obtaining the services of a player on loan. The loanee club, also usually has to pay for the entire salary owed to the player, during the duration of the loan. However, in both instances of high-profile loans of Alexis Sanchez (from Manchester United to Inter Milan in 2019), or Gareth Bale (from Real Madrid to Tottenham in 2020), the loaning clubs would continue to pay a sizeable percentage of the high salaries owed during the loan, in order to successfully complete the loan out of an underperforming player with high salaries, in search for more playing time. Loans can be used to facilitate a permanent transfer that will only occur in the following year's summer transfer window, often termed Loan with Obligation to Buy.

This is often conducted in order to spread out the balance of payments of the purchasing club over an extra year, in order to comply with UEFA Financial Fair Play regulations. Loans can also be used in conjunction with a permanent transfer of the same player within the same transfer window; the purchasing club (who bought the contractual playing rights of a footballer) can subsequently loan the player back to the selling club or a third club. This is to ensure both the transfer of playing rights ownership (to the purchasing club) and the pursuit of obtaining more experience and matchplay elsewhere (away from the congested squad depth of the purchasing club).

=== Buy-back clause ===
A transfer may also include a buy-back clause, whereby the selling club attaches an exercisable option to buy-back the player at a predetermined financial amount (which is usually higher than the initial purchase price of the buying club), at a predetermined later date (usually two years after the completed sale). If the option is not exercised by a certain date, the option expires. This is usually conducted by elite clubs who had earlier bought talented young players but would prefer the young players to improve their abilities and become more experienced. For the purchasing club, this would also guarantee the player's services for a predetermined period (of at least 2 years). This differs from a standing loan, as player ownership changes to the purchasing club along with a transfer fee being sent to the selling club, which enhances the selling club's ability to adapt to the UEFA Financial Fair Play regulations. Often, the buy-back clause is included with another right of first refusal clause, whereby if any third club offers to purchase a player from his current club (second club); the former club of the player (first club) which had previously included the buy-back clause, is able to match any financial offer (made by any third club) to purchase the player.

=== Buyout clause ===
A buyout clause refers to a clause in a football player's contract that requires a willing club which intends to purchase the playing rights of the football player under contract with his current club, to pay a stipulated amount (which is usually substantially high) as stated within the clause, to the club that still owns the contractual playing rights of the player. The buyout clause is only valid during the stipulated duration of the clause, and the current club may always choose to sell at a lower price and before the expiry of the clause, if it chooses to do so and agrees an early transfer with another club.

== Solidarity contribution ==
Manchester City paid Santos €1.805 million in solidarity contribution for Robinho.

Under FIFA rules, if a professional football player transfers to another club during the course of a contract, 5% of any transfer fee, not including training compensation paid to his former club, shall be deducted from the total amount of this transfer fee and distributed by the new club as a solidarity contribution to the club(s) involved in his training and education over the years. This solidarity contribution reflects the number of years he was registered with the relevant club(s) between the seasons of his 12th and 23rd birthdays, as follows:

| Season of birthday | % of compensation | % of total transfer fee |
|---|---|---|
| 12th | 5% | 0.25% |
| 13th | 5% | 0.25% |
| 14th | 5% | 0.25% |
| 15th | 5% | 0.25% |
| 16th | 10% | 0.50% |
| 17th | 10% | 0.50% |
| 18th | 10% | 0.50% |
| 19th | 10% | 0.50% |
| 20th | 10% | 0.50% |
| 21st | 10% | 0.50% |
| 22nd | 10% | 0.50% |
| 23rd | 10% | 0.50% |
| Total | 100% | 5% |

As of July 2015, there is an ongoing controversy between several youth soccer clubs and the United States Soccer Federation (U.S. Soccer) over this issue. When Major League Soccer's Seattle Sounders FC sold the rights to DeAndre Yedlin to Tottenham Hotspur for US$4 million, a Seattle-area youth club for which Yedlin had played, Crossfire Premier, sought its share of solidarity payments. While Spurs acknowledged Crossfire's claim, MLS and U.S. Soccer intercepted the funds before they could be sent to Crossfire, claiming that the sealed ruling in a 1996 antitrust case gave MLS exclusive rights to all transfer fees involving league players. Crossfire has since petitioned FIFA to either force payment or allow the club to sue MLS and U.S. Soccer; several other youth clubs have since joined in Crossfire's request, including one of Clint Dempsey's previous clubs.

=== Examples ===
- Stephen Appiah: solidarity contribution was excluded from the agreed €8 million price. Fenerbahçe had an obligation to pay former clubs for additional €400,000.
- Vitorino Antunes: €1.5 million x 5% x (5% x 4 seasons + 10% x 4 seasons) = €45,000 to Freamunde from Roma
- Arjen Robben: €500,000 to Groningen from Bayern Munich
- Robinho: €1.805 million to Santos from Manchester City

== Training compensation ==
Training Compensation is compensation to the cost of training the players. In FIFA status:

Training compensation shall be paid to a player’s training club(s): (1) when a player signs his first contract as a professional and (2) each time a professional is transferred until the end of the season of his 23rd birthday."

FIFA does not have any power to force member associations to enforce the clause, thus FIFA only has jurisdiction on international transfers for claiming compensation. Youth clubs are ranked by their sizes to receive certain amount of money, which the schedule of rate would be updated periodically, however the rates would also be affected by the new club that signs the player. Newcastle United had to pay compensation for Charles N'Zogbia even though was signed as a free agent.

Disagreement over training compensation sometimes produces legal battles in order to escape the payment, which Matthias Lepiller was signed in 2006 by Fiorentina, however an appeal in the Court of Arbitration for Sport (CAS) was rejected in 2011, five years after Lepiller left the club. Clubs also arranged special transfer agreement in order to lower the actual signing cost. For example, Attila Filkor joined a Maltese club as free agent and immediately sold to Inter Milan. As the schedule of rates between Maltese and Italian top division were different, cost was saved until Filkor's mother club sued Inter to FIFA. The FA has its own system of training compensation; for example, Chelsea were required to pay compensation to Manchester City for Daniel Sturridge. In Italy, Career Premium (Italian: Premio alla carriera) were paid to mother club once the players had make his Serie A debut or Italy under-21 debut, for example, Davide Moscardelli. While Preparation Premium (Italian: Premi di Preparazione) were paid to youth clubs when the players signed his first professional contract.

== Transfer bans ==
One method of club punishment used by FIFA is a ban on transfers. In 2005, Italian team Roma were given a one-year transfer ban by FIFA, beginning on 1 July, when in September 2004, French centre back Philippe Mexès joined the club while still contracted with Auxerre. On appeal to the CAS in December 2005, the ban was reduced to end after the January transfer window, but the CAS upheld the view Roma had "not only encouraged Mexès to break his contract with Auxerre, but actively provoked the break".

In April 2009, Swiss team Sion were told by FIFA they could not sign any players until the 2010 off-season as punishment for signing Egyptian goalkeeper Essam El-Hadary from Egyptian team Al Ahly in 2008 before his contract expired. In 2011, UEFA threatened to ban all Swiss teams from European competition, ordering the Swiss Football Association to make the decision. Sion were eventually given a 36-point deduction. On 3 September 2009, Chelsea were banned from registering any new players in the January and Summer 2010 transfer windows after FIFA's dispute resolution chamber (DRC) ruled that French winger Gaël Kakuta had breached his contract with Lens when he joined Chelsea in 2007, and that Chelsea had induced him to do so. However, the ban was quickly lifted by the CAS when Chelsea agreed to pay £793,000 in compensation and training costs.

Also in 2009, English team Portsmouth were banned from signing new players until debts owed to fellow English teams Chelsea and Arsenal were paid with regard to the transfers of Glen Johnson in 2007 and Lassana Diarra in 2008. The ban was lifted three months later by the Premier League. In February 2012, English team Port Vale received a transfer embargo due to an unpaid bill, which meant that the signing of ex-Vale player Chris Birchall could not be completed. Less than two weeks later, Vale entered administration. In November 2012, upon the completion of the purchase of the club by Paul Wildes, Vale exited administration and the embargo was lifted. Soon after, Vale eventually completed the signing of Birchall, who had been playing with Major League Soccer's Columbus Crew.

Also in 2012, Scottish team Rangers were given a 12-month registration ban by the Scottish Football Association for breaching rule 66 – bringing the game into disrepute. This meant Rangers could still transfer players into the club, but they could not be registered with the governing body. This came after Rangers entered administration. A Court of Session judge had ruled that the Scottish Football Association (SFA) acted beyond its powers in imposing the year-long transfer ban on Rangers, but Rangers accepted the ban as a condition of gaining membership to the Scottish Football Association. In 2012, fellow Scottish team Hearts received a two-month ban for failing to pay the wages of six first-team players and manager McGlynn on time. In 2013, they received an eight-month ban for entering administration, meaning new players would not be able to registered with the club until February 2014.

In December 2012, English team Bury received a transfer ban after the club took out a short-term loan with the Professional Footballers' Association (PFA). The ban was lifted in January 2013 after they repaid the loan, but in February they received a second embargo after receiving another loan from the PFA. This embargo lasted until May 2013, when the club were taken over by Stewart Day and the loans were repaid, at which point the club had been relegated to League Two and been forced to release 16 players. In 2013, English team Watford received a five-month transfer ban for breaching football rules during the period from September 2011 until former owner Laurence Bassini sold the club to Giampaolo Pozzo in June 2012. Watford and Bassini were found guilty of failing to inform the football authorities about financial agreements set up with a company called LNOC, in particular their role in the transfer of Danny Graham to Swansea City. During the embargo period Watford were still able to register players with prior permission from league officials. Also in 2013, French team Nantes received a ban lasting two transfer windows after breaking rules over the 2012 signing of striker Ismaël Bangoura from Emirati club Al Nasr. It was ruled that Nantes had persuaded Bangoura to break his contract with the UAE team, and were fined €4.5 million by FIFA, to be paid to Al Nasr. After an initial reprieve, the ban was upheld.

In April 2014, Spanish club Barcelona received a transfer ban for two consecutive windows starting June 2014 and a fine of £305,000 for breaches relating to the international transfer and registration of players under the age of 18, while the Royal Spanish Football Federation (RFEF) received a fine of £340,000 and told to "regularise its regulatory framework and existing system concerning the international transfer of minors in football". FIFA's regulations dictate that international transfers regarding minors are only accepted in three scenarios: (1) the player's parents have moved to another country for non-related reasons; (2) the move takes place within the European Union if the player is aged between 16 and 18; or (3) the player's home is less than 50 km from the national border being crossed. However the ban was temporarily lifted until the end of the transfer window, giving the club the ability to purchase players in the summer transfer window of 2014, during which they were able to complete the purchases of Marc-André ter Stegen, Claudio Bravo, Luis Suárez, Jérémy Mathieu, and Thomas Vermaelen. The appeal was rejected on 20 August. The ban was said to have "shattered" Barcelona's image. Sporting director Andoni Zubizarreta was sacked in January 2015 for the part he played.

In December 2014, English teams Blackburn Rovers, Leeds United and Nottingham Forest were given a transfer ban of one transfer window for breaking league-implemented financial fair play regulations; the three clubs exceeded deviation limitations on operating loss and shareholder investment, set at £8 million. In February 2019, Chelsea were banned by FIFA from signing new players for two transfer windows. The ban was handed following breach of international transfer and registration of players under the age of 18. However, the club still reserved the right to appeal to Court of Arbitration for Sport. In December 2019, the ban was reduced by CAS ahead of January transfer window. However, the club in its statement said that FIFA's conduct was “deeply unsatisfactory". "The approach taken by FIFA to this case has been deeply unsatisfactory, not least as FIFA chose to treat Chelsea entirely differently to Manchester City for reasons that make absolutely no sense to Chelsea," a club's statement read. In August 2024, the European Union's top court declared some of FIFA's player transfer rules, particularly those requiring compensation when players end contracts early, as incompatible with EU free movement laws. The case, centered on former player Lassana Diarra, could prompt FIFA to revise its transfer policies, potentially giving players greater flexibility to switch clubs.

== See also ==
- Buyout clause
- Co-ownership (football)
- Cup-tied
- List of most expensive association football transfers
- Loan (sports)
- Retain and transfer system
- Third-party ownership in association football
- Trade (sports)
