= Professional Footballers' Association =

English and Welsh association football trade union

PFA
- Professional Footballers' Association
- Founded: 1907; 119 years ago
- Headquarters: Lincoln Building, Lincoln Square, Brazennose Street, Manchester, M2 5AD
- Location(s): England and Wales, United Kingdom
- Members: ▲5,834 (2024)
- CEO: Maheta Molango
- Chairman: Omar Beckles
- Affiliations: TUC; GFTU; FIFPro
- Website: thepfa.com

The Professional Footballers' Association (PFA) is the trade union for professional footballers in England and Wales.

Founded in 1907, it is the world's oldest professional sports trade union, with approximately 5,000 current members each season, including players from the Premier League, EFL and Women's Super League. Nearly 50,000 former members retain access to services and benefits including education grants, coaching courses and wellbeing support.

The PFA actively supports players with legal assistance, representation on contractual and disciplinary matters, and offers personal and professional development opportunities. The union also provides extensive mental and physical wellbeing support, and is committed to advocating for player rights at national and international levels. This includes taking legal action on issues such as player workload and pushing for equal representation and conditions in women's football.

Current initiatives include the PFA Business School, which provides leadership training for players, and exclusive UEFA coaching programmes. The union also prioritises brain health through research and direct support for members dealing with neurodegenerative diseases. Additionally, it runs rehabilitation programmes for injured players, pre-season camps for out-of-contract members, and ongoing aftercare support for former professionals transitioning into life after football.

The current CEO of the PFA is Maheta Molango, who took over in 2021. Its Players' Board, led by Gillingham's Omar Beckles, represents member interests. The PFA's leadership team is supported by an Operational Board of non-executive directors, which oversees governance.

== History ==
=== The Players' Union ===
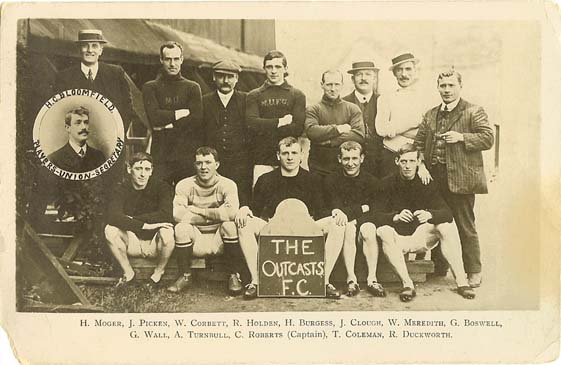
"Outcasts FC" photograph taken before the 1909–10 season.

The PFA was formed on 2 December 1907 as the Association Football Players' and Trainers' Union (AFPTU; commonly referred to at the time as the Players' Union). On that date, Charlie Roberts and Billy Meredith (who had been involved in the AFU), both of Manchester United, convened the Players' Union at Manchester's Imperial Hotel.

This was the second attempt to organise a union of professional footballers in England, after the Association Footballers' Union (the "AFU"), formed in 1898, had been dissolved in 1901. The AFU had failed in its objectives of bringing about a relaxation of the restrictions on the movement of players from one club to another in the Football League and preventing the introduction of a maximum wage of £4 per week for players in the Football League.

Like the AFU before it, the Players' Union intended to challenge the maximum wage and the restriction on transfers, in the form of the "retain and transfer" system.

=== Threatened strike action in 1909 ===
When the Players' Union made its objectives clear in 1909, the Football Association withdrew its recognition of the Union, which at that time was seeking to join the U.K.'s General Federation of Trade Unions ('GFTU').

In response, the Union threatened strike action. The Football Association in turn banned players affiliated with the AFPTU before the start of the 1909–10 season. The ban saw membership of the Union fall. However, players from Manchester United refused to relinquish their membership. League clubs turned to amateur players to replace players that had been banned, but Manchester United were not able to find enough replacements, risking the cancellation of their opening fixture at home to Bradford City. The Manchester United players were called "Outcasts FC".

The deadlock swung in favour of the Union when Tim Coleman of Everton came out in support of the Union. Coleman's intervention resuscitated support for the Union, which regained its strength of numbers. Agreement was reached on official recognition for the Union in exchange for allowing bonus payments to be made to players to supplement the maximum wage. The maximum wage remained for more than another half century.

=== Continuing battles with the Football League ===
The 1910s saw the Union backing a challenge by Herbert Kingaby against the retain and transfer system in the courts. Kingaby brought legal proceedings against his former employers, Aston Villa, for preventing him from playing. The Players' Union funded the proceedings. Erroneous strategy by Kingaby's counsel resulted in the suit ending disastrously for the Union. The Union were almost ruined financially and membership fell drastically.

Although membership increased from 300 in 1915 to well over 1000 by 1920 this did not herald a new era of radicalism among the rank-and-file. Widespread unemployment heralded declines in attendance at Football League matches at a time when many clubs had, once again, committed themselves to expensive ground improvement programmes in the expectation that the post-war spectator boom would continue indefinitely. Inevitably, this caused financial difficulties at many clubs. Clubs believed their problems were due to players' excessive wages rather than over-expansion. In the spring of 1922, they persuaded the League authorities to arbitrarily impose a £1 cut to the maximum wage (£9 a week at that time) and force clubs to reduce the wages of players who were on less than the maximum. Legal proceedings backed by the Players' Union this time established that clubs could not unilaterally impose a cut in players' contracted wages.

Between 1946 and 1957 the Chairman of the Union was former Portsmouth captain Jimmy Guthrie. His book Soccer Rebel, published in 1976, documents his chairmanship and the struggle of the Union to improve the lot of professional footballers in the years preceding the abolition of the maximum wage.

In 1955, the union affiliated to the Trades Union Congress (TUC).

=== Modernisation ===
In 1956, Jimmy Hill became secretary of the Players' Union. He soon changed the union's name to the Professional Footballers' Association (the "PFA"), changing a blue collar image to one in keeping with the new wave of working-class actors and entertainers.

In 1957, Jimmy Hill became chairman of the PFA and campaigned to have the Football League's £20 maximum wage scrapped, which he achieved in January 1961. His Fulham teammate Johnny Haynes became the first £100 player.

The PFA also backed George Eastham in his legal action against the retain and transfer system, providing him with £15,000 to pay for his legal fees. The case was brought against his former club, Newcastle United, in the High Court. In 1963, The Court held that the retain and transfer system was an unreasonable restraint of trade.

From 1960, the union began representing trainers, and for a time was known as the "Professional Footballers' and Trainers' Association".

The union decided to register under the Industrial Relations Act 1971, something the TUC opposed. As a result, it left the TUC in 1973, finally rejoining in 1995.

=== Centenary ===
2007 brought along the 100th year since the foundation of The Players Union, and to commemorate the centenary year, the PFA launched their "One Goal One Million" campaign. The campaign involved a whole year of celebratory fund-raising activities with the aim of raising £1 million to fully fund a new children's rehabilitation and physiotherapy unit at the University Children's Hospital, Manchester. Throughout the year the PFA ran a number of high-profile events involving current and former players and managers with the sole purpose of reaching the £1 million target. Events included a pro-celebrity golf event, race days and initiatives involving younger supporters. On the day that the PFA was formed in 1907 – 2 December – there was a match between an England Legends XI – captained by Alan Shearer and managed by Terry Venables – and a World Legends XI – captained by Gianfranco Zola and managed by Jürgen Klinsmann – culminating in a gala dinner in the evening involving a host of top entertainers.

In December of the centenary year, the PFA issued Fans' Favourites; a list of the favourite players at each Football League club. In making the selection, the PFA canvassed the opinions of the supporters of present, and some former, League clubs about their favourite player.

== Independent Review and Governance Restructure ==
In 2018, the Professional Footballers' Association (PFA) commissioned an Independent Review to enhance its governance, transparency, accountability, and independence, ensuring the PFA operates effectively and in the best interests of its members. The review was prompted by a dispute. over Ben Purkiss' eligibility as Chairman, and an open letter from 200 players calling for Chief Executive Gordon Taylor to stand down. In response, Taylor promised a full and open review of the union's structure. At the 2018 AGM, held in Manchester in March 2019, it was agreed that Taylor, Purkiss, and the entire management committee would step down following the completion of the review. This extensive review concluded in July 2020 and outlined recommendations for the PFA's future development.

Former England, Manchester United, and PFA Management Committee member Gary Neville was appointed to oversee the selection panel for the recruitment of four non-executive members, in line with the Independent Review Panel's recommendations and supported by a specialist recruitment agency. This marked the first step towards implementing the recommendations and establishing a new governance structure. The structure includes an Operational Board and a Players’ Board. The Operational Board, responsible for overseeing day-to-day operations, consists of non-executive members, the CEO, and the Chair and Vice-Chair of the Players’ Board, with a non-executive member elected as chair. The Players' Board holds ultimate decision-making authority and delegates operational responsibilities to the Operational Board. It is directly representative of the union's membership, with 13 members, including representatives from the Premier League, WSL, EFL Championship, League One, and League Two, along with three former players, at least two of whom have played professionally in the past five years.

Delegates approved the new rules at the AGM, which are now in effect. Following an open and competitive recruitment process, Maheta Molango was appointed as the new Chief Executive, leading the organisation through this period of change and development.

== PFA Awards ==
In 1974, the PFA created three awards to be given to players – or people who have contributed a lot to the game – every year.

- Players' Player of the Year award: Given to the player voted the best of the season by his fellow players.
- Young Player of the Year award: Given to the young player voted the best of the season by the PFA.
- Merit Award: Given to the person who has contributed the most to football over the season, as voted for by the PFA.

In 1974 they introduced the first team based award:

- Team of the Year award: Given to eleven players in each league (forty-four players in total) who are deemed the best of the season by the PFA.

In 2001, they created another award:

- Fans' Player of the Year award: Given to the player voted the best of the season by the fans.

In 2013 and 2014 respectively, the PFA instituted the first female awards:

- PFA Women's Players' Player of the Year award: Given to the female player voted the best of the season by her fellow players.
- PFA Young Women's Player of the Year award: Given to the young female player voted the best of the season by the PFA.

At this time the PFA Player of the Year award was renamed Men's PFA Player of the Year and the PFA Young Player of the Year was renamed Men's PFA Young Player of the Year.

In 2020, the PFA added another award for the women:

- Fans' Women Player of the Year award: Given to the player voted the best of the WSL season by the fans.

== Sexism controversy ==
In 1997 some Sheffield United players invited their agent, Rachel Anderson, to the annual awards dinner. Anderson was turned away by then PFA Deputy Chief Executive Brendon Batson because she is a woman.

The following year, when West Ham United F.C. player Julian Dicks invited Anderson to attend the dinner, Anderson contacted the PFA to find out what their reaction would be. On receiving a response that she would indeed be banned Anderson decided to go public and take the PFA to court. As a result, the Minister for Sport, Tony Banks, and the Chief Executive of The Football Association, Graham Kelly boycotted the event.

Anderson won in court and the financial cost to the PFA was considerable, Anderson suggests "over £200,000", of which she received £7,500 for "hurt feelings" and an undisclosed amount for "reasonable costs".

In 2013 the PFA instituted awards for the PFA Women's Players' Player of the Year. Kim Little was the recipient in the first year.

== Current union objectives ==
The PFA supports all current and former professional footballers in England across the Premier League, English Football League (EFL) and Women's Super League (WSL).

Through its day-to-day work, the union directly supports players with legal assistance and representation on a wide range of football-related matters (e.g. contractual and disciplinary issues), provides personal and professional development opportunities, and offers mental and physical wellbeing support.

The union also works with stakeholders and governing bodies at the national and international level to promote and protect players’ rights and conditions.

=== Player rights advocacy ===
==== Scheduling and player workload ====
In June 2024, the PFA joined a legal action against FIFA over the "overloaded and unworkable" football match calendar which was presented before the Belgian courts. The PFA is a co-claimant in the case alongside the French players’ union (UNFP) and FIFPRO Europe.

In July 2024, the PFA also joined European Leagues and FIFPRO in a separate legal complaint to the European Commission over FIFA's “abuse of dominance” in the game. Announcing the legal measures, PFA CEO Maheta Molango, who is also on the Board of FIFPRO Europe, said that “legal action is the unfortunate but inevitable consequence of major stakeholders in the game – the leagues and the players – being ignored.”

Molango has warned that players are willing to take direct action if demands are not listened to with regards to workload. He said: “We have reached a point where we cannot discount any action." Molango has said the football schedule is a health risk and is “killing the product.”

==== Women's football ====
The PFA welcomed the Government's review into women's football led by Karen Carney, published in July 2023, which recommended that “comprehensive and formalised union representation for both Women's Super League and Women's Championship players.” At present the union does not receive direct funding from the FA towards its representation of professional players from the women's game.

In December 2023, the PFA welcomed the Government's backing of the Carney review's recommendations. Molango said that “players will now rightly expect to see [the recommendations] acted on.”

The PFA is a member of the Women's Football Review Implementation Group which was formed to “progress the review's recommendations.”

PFA CEO Maheta Molango used an address to the TUC Congress in 2023 to ask Britain's trade unions to support the call for “equal rights and conditions for female footballers.” The motion was backed by Lionesses Lucy Bronze and Katie Zelem, a member of the elected PFA Player's Board.

=== Player guidance and representation ===
==== Legal guidance and support ====
All members of the PFA are entitled to receive contractual advice from the PFA. Under the standard playing contract, current players are also entitled to representation during general and field disciplinary appeals with the FA and with tribunals with the Premier League, EFL and WSL.

The PFA's legal department oversees all governance and policy matters related to the union. Working alongside the Player Services division, it also provides members with advice on various legal issues in relation to all football matters. General Counsel James King, formerly part of the legal team at Arsenal FC, was appointed to lead the department in May 2022.

=== Professional and personal development ===
==== PFA Business School ====
In May 2023, the PFA launched the ‘PFA Business School’ to “develop the next generation of leaders in football management.” The school offers PFA members access to bespoke football-relevant courses, led by leaders from across football and sport. Degree and certificate qualifications are accredited by the University of Portsmouth.

In June 2024, the PFA Business School launched a first-of-its-kind undergraduate degree designed specifically for footballers. The course incorporates study for the UEFA B Coaching licence, the FA Talent ID & Scouting Certificate, and preparation for the FIFA Agent Licence. Arsenal, Chelsea, Newcastle United, West Ham United, Brighton, Crystal Palace, Wolves and Watford signed a partnership with the PFA to co-fund player participation in the programme.

Former Arsenal manager and FIFA's Chief of Global Football Development is overseeing the course as Course Director. Players Jordan Henderson, Phil Jones, Lucy Staniforth and İlkay Gündoğan have studied with the PFA Business School.

==== Coaching and officiating ====
The PFA delivers exclusive, subsidised courses to help current and former professional players gain UEFA coaching badges. The courses are led by the PFA's in-house team of coach developers, led by Head of Coach Development and former Lioness Lousie Newstead, who was appointed in April 2024.

Granit Xhaka, Jermain Defoe, Mohamed Elneny and Colin Kazim-Richards are among the former Premier League players to have undertaken their UEFA coaching badges with the PFA.

In May 2024, the PFA, FA and UEFA announced the first-ever all-female cohort of students for the UEFA A Licence course. The course consists of 17 current and former professional players, including Steph Houghton, Aoife Mannion, Kim Little, Beth Mead and Karen Bardsley.

The PFA Coach Development department co-runs the Professional Player to Coach Scheme (PPCS) alongside the Premier League and EFL. The scheme is designed to increase the number of Black, South Asian and Minority Ethnic players who transition into full-time coaching roles in the professional game.

In June 2024, the PFA announced a partnership with PGMOL (Professional Game Match Officials Limited) to create a new programme offering current and former players the chance to explore a career in refereeing.

==== Personal Development ====
The union's Personal Development department provides current and former members with access to career advice and skills development opportunities. The department provides members to career advice, professional development guidance and access to funding to pursue courses and academic or vocational qualifications.

Former Brighton and Chelsea manager Graham Potter completed a PFA-funded Social Sciences degree from the Open University.

=== Mental and physical wellbeing ===
==== Wellbeing ====
The PFA's Wellbeing department provides the union's members – past and present – with tailored support around all aspects of mental health and behavioural challenges. The department offers direct support to players and clubs, as well as via partners at the Sporting Chance clinic, which provides mental health support specifically for professional sportspeople.

Members can access a specialised network of over 200 therapeutic counsellors, a 24/7 helpline which puts players in direct contact with a counsellor, and residential care is also accessible for members with particular behavioural or addiction challenges.

Led by psychotherapist and former professional player Dr Michael Bennett, the department conducts tailored workshops to clubs across the Premier League, EFL and WSL. These workshops focus on holistic wellbeing, as well as issues specific to footballers and their working environments.

Confidential data collected during visits to clubs is used to track and highlight wellbeing issues for players in the professional game. In November 2023, the PFA highlighted that anxiety and online abuse were prevalent issues for its members.

In May 2024, the PFA and Loughborough University published findings from a joint study into snus use among professional footballers. The project was commissioned by the union the year prior to explore the usage and perceived health and performance effects of snus use among players.

==== Brain Health ====
The PFA's Brain Health division leads the union's work around educating and supporting current and former members on all things related to their brain health. The union states that its work is focused on two areas: “developing a culture of positive brain health for players across football”, and “enhancing the quality of life for players living with neurodegenerative disease.”

The department is led by Dr Adam White, an interdisciplinary researcher crossing sport, medicine and health and the co-founder of the Concussion Legacy Foundation.

The union conducts year-round workshops in clubs, educating players and staff coaches on associated risks, relevant guidelines and the need to protect the brain health of players during training and matches.

The department funds and promotes academic research focused on improving current and former players brain health, including brain donation. The PFA has co-funded two studies, FIELD and FOCUS, to help advance understandings of dementia amongst former professional footballers.

In September 2023, the PFA and Premier League launched the Football Brain Health Fund. The fund was established with an initial allocation of £1 million to provide financial support to former players and their families affected by dementia and other neurodegenerative diseases. The union's CEO, Maheta Molango, has said there needs to be a “football-wide responsibility” in supporting former players with neurodegenerative disease.

The PFA's Brain Health division provides guidance and support for players and families suffering with neurodegenerative disease, including free access to Admiral Nurses specialising in dementia care. Dawn Astle and Rachel Walden, daughters of Jeff Astle and Rod Taylor respectively, joined the union in 2021 to support the union's care provision for members.

The PFA and FA co-fund the Advanced BRAIN Health Clinic. Located at the Institute of Sport, Exercise and Health (ISEH) in central London, the clinic provides confidential and specialist neurological assessments to mid-life retired male and female professional footballers.

==== Rehabilitation support ====
The PFA provides players with free, residential rehabilitation support at St George's park. Delivered in partnership with Game Changer Performance (GCP), the scheme is designed to help members overcome injury and safely return to playing.

=== Aftercare for former professional players ===
==== The After Academy ====
In April 2024, the PFA was confirmed as a supporting partner to Trent Alexander Arnold's 'The After Academy' project. The initiative provides career opportunities for former academy players who wish to forge new career paths outside of professional football.

The union hosts the scheme's job board which was launched in February 2024 and is the main access point to view and apply for job listings.

Alexander-Arnold said: “I'm proud of this programme as it looks to give another chance to those who didn't make it, and I hope it is just a first step towards a brighter future for these young players.”

==== RECONNECT ====
In April 2024, the PFA launched RECONNECT – a nationwide fitness network available to retired PFA members and aimed at helping ex-professional players manage the physical and mental transition away from playing full-time.

The scheme was backed by Leicester City's 2016 Premier League title-winning captain West Morgan. The network is part of a wider PFA effort to help members during and after their playing careers.

PFA CEO Maheta Molango said: “The physical impact of moving away from full-time football is often overlooked, but it can have big knock-on effects at what is often a really challenging time for players.”

Monthly sessions take place at Cardiff Metropolitan University, Liverpool John Moores University, Leeds Beckett University, Hull University, Loughborough University, University College Birmingham, University of East Anglia, among others.

=== Pre-season support for out-of-contract players ===
==== PFA pre-season ====
To support out-of-contract players during the off-season, in May 2024 the union announced the introduction of ‘PFA pre-season’, a 10-week residential training camp for PFA members. The scheme followed a successful two-week pilot hosted the year prior.

‘PFA pre-season’ was made available to PFA members who were under professional contracts over the 2023/24 season.

Each week-long camp provided members with a full pre-season training schedule, including on-pitch training and fixtures, strength and conditioning as well as rehabilitation and recovery sessions. The camp was hosted at Champney Springs in Leicestershire with players’ accommodation, nutrition and kit all provided by the union.

The scheme was backed by Newcastle United manager Eddie Howe: “There are a lot of players who will really benefit from this as a way of giving them the best chance of staying ready for when the next opportunity comes.”

In 2024, the camp was attended by players including Dwight Gayle, Ciaran Clark, Aiden O’Brien, Omar Bogle, and Asmir Begovic. Clark said: “You can see how much it helps the lads. It's massive really, physically and mentally. Being around the lads and the coaches, getting your training sessions in, eating together. It's all the lads know really.”

The initiative was introduced following a recommendation from the PFA Players’ Board, an elected leadership group of current and former players which helps set the direction of the union.

== Key personnel ==
=== Players' Board ===
- Omar Beckles (Chair)
- Peter Vincenti (Vice Chair)
- Danielle Carter
- Peter Clarke
- Alex Rodman
- Kevin Ellison
- George Friend
- Katie Zelem
- Tom Heaton
- Chris McCready
- Wes Morgan
- Marvin Sordell

=== Chairs ===
1907: Harry Mainman
1910: Evelyn Lintott
1911: Colin Veitch
1919: Charlie Roberts
1921: Jimmy Lawrence
1922: Jimmy Fay
1929: Howard Matthews
1930: Arthur Wood
1931: David Robbie
1936: Albert Barrett
1937: Sammy Crooks
1946: Jimmy Guthrie
1956: Jimmy Hill
1961: Tommy Cummings
1963: Malcolm Musgrove
1966: Noel Cantwell
1967: Terry Neill
1970: Derek Dougan
1978: Gordon Taylor
1980: Alan Gowling
1982: Steve Coppell
1984: Brian Talbot
1988: Garth Crooks
1990: Brian Marwood
1993: Pat Nevin
1997: Barry Horne
2001: Nick Cusack
2002: Richard Jobson
2003: Dean Holdsworth
2005: Chris Powell
2010: Clarke Carlisle
2013: Ritchie Humphreys
2017: Ben Purkiss
2021: John Mousinho
2023: Omar Beckles

==== Chief Executives ====
This position was originally named "secretary".

1907: Herbert Broomfield
1910: Albert Owen
1913: Harry Newbould
1929: Jimmy Fay
1953: Cliff Lloyd
1981: Gordon Taylor
2021: Maheta Molango

== See also ==
- Football Writers' Association
- Professional Footballers' Association of Ireland
- The Players' Union
- The Football Association
