= 1911–12 in English football =

Football in England
- Season: 1911–12

The 1911–12 season was the 41st season of competitive football in England.

== Overview ==
Blackburn Rovers won the First Division title for the first time. Preston North End and Bury were relegated, to be replaced by Second Division Champions Derby County and runners up, Chelsea. Barnsley won the FA Cup in a replayed final against West Bromwich Albion; Manchester Utd won the Charity Shield with a spectacular 8–4 victory over Swindon Town.

== Events ==
Grimsby Town returned to the Second Division after a season away. Lincoln City were the team to make way for them.

In March, Justice A.T. Lawrence established the legality of the football league's retain-and-transfer system with his judgement in the Kingaby case. Former Aston Villa player Herbert Kingaby had brought legal proceedings against his old club for preventing him from playing. Erroneous strategy by Kingaby's counsel resulted in the suit being dismissed.

== Honours ==
Competition	Winner
First Division	Blackburn Rovers (1)
Second Division	Derby County
FA Cup	Barnsley (1)
Charity Shield	Manchester United
Home Championship	England & Scotland

Notes = Number in parentheses is the times that club has won that honour. * indicates new record for competition

== League tables ==
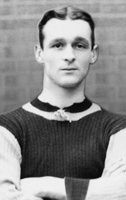
Aston Villa's "Happy" Harry Hampton, League top scorer

=== First Division ===
Pos	Team	Pld	W	D	L	GF	GA	GAv	Pts	Relegation
1	Blackburn Rovers (C)	38	20	9	9	60	43	1.395	49	
2	Everton	38	20	6	12	46	42	1.095	46	
3	Newcastle United	38	18	8	12	64	50	1.280	44	
4	Bolton Wanderers	38	20	3	15	54	43	1.256	43	
5	The Wednesday	38	16	9	13	69	49	1.408	41	
6	Aston Villa	38	17	7	14	76	63	1.206	41	
7	Middlesbrough	38	16	8	14	56	45	1.244	40	
8	Sunderland	38	14	11	13	58	51	1.137	39	
9	West Bromwich Albion	38	15	9	14	43	47	0.915	39	
10	Woolwich Arsenal	38	15	8	15	55	59	0.932	38	
11	Bradford City	38	15	8	15	46	50	0.920	38	
12	Tottenham Hotspur	38	14	9	15	53	53	1.000	37	
13	Manchester United	38	13	11	14	45	60	0.750	37	
14	Sheffield United	38	13	10	15	63	56	1.125	36	
15	Manchester City	38	13	9	16	56	58	0.966	35	
16	Notts County	38	14	7	17	46	63	0.730	35	
17	Liverpool	38	12	10	16	49	55	0.891	34	
18	Oldham Athletic	38	12	10	16	46	54	0.852	34	
19	Preston North End (R)	38	13	7	18	40	57	0.702	33	Relegation to the Second Division
20	Bury (R)	38	6	9	23	32	59	0.542	21	Relegation to the Second Division

Source: World Football
Rules for classification: 1) Points; 2) Goal average; 3) Goals scored
(C) Champions; (R) Relegated

=== Second Division ===
Pos	Team	Pld	W	D	L	GF	GA	GAv	Pts	Promotion or relegation
1	Derby County (C, P)	38	23	8	7	74	28	2.643	54	Promotion to the First Division
2	Chelsea (P)	38	24	6	8	64	34	1.882	54	Promotion to the First Division
3	Burnley	38	22	8	8	77	41	1.878	52	
4	Clapton Orient	38	21	3	14	61	44	1.386	45	
5	Wolverhampton Wanderers	38	16	10	12	57	33	1.727	42	
6	Barnsley	38	15	12	11	45	42	1.071	42	
7	Hull City	38	17	8	13	54	51	1.059	42	
8	Fulham	38	16	7	15	66	58	1.138	39	
9	Grimsby Town	38	15	9	14	48	55	0.873	39	
10	Leicester Fosse	38	15	7	16	49	66	0.742	37	
11	Bradford (Park Avenue)	38	13	9	16	44	45	0.978	35	
12	Birmingham	38	14	6	18	55	59	0.932	34	
13	Bristol City	38	14	6	18	41	60	0.683	34	
14	Blackpool	38	13	8	17	32	52	0.615	34	
15	Nottingham Forest	38	13	7	18	46	48	0.958	33	
16	Stockport County	38	11	11	16	47	54	0.870	33	
17	Huddersfield Town	38	13	6	19	50	64	0.781	32	
18	Glossop	38	8	12	18	42	56	0.750	28	
19	Leeds City	38	10	8	20	50	78	0.641	28	Re-elected
20	Gainsborough Trinity (R)	38	5	13	20	30	64	0.469	23	Failed re-election and demoted

(C) Champions; (P) Promoted; (R) Relegated
