= Alfred Edwards (footballer) =

English footballer

Personal information
- Full name: Alfred Edwards
- Date of birth: 1889
- Place of birth: Coventry, England
- Date of death: 4 November 1918 (aged 28–29)
- Position: Centre half

Youth career
- Coventry Lord Street

Senior career*
Years	Team	Apps	(Gls)
–1910	Stourbridge		
1910–1912	Aston Villa	6	(0)
1912	Dudley Town		
1912–1913	Bristol City	4	(0)
- Newport County
- * Club domestic league appearances and goals

Alfred Edwards (1889 – 4 November 1918), sometimes known as Albert Edwards, was an English professional footballer who played as a centre half in the Football League for Aston Villa and Bristol City.

== Personal life ==
Edwards served in the 17th and 13th battalions of the Middlesex Regiment during the First World War. He was holding the rank of lance sergeant at the time of his death on 4 November 1918, when, while "digging protection" under heavy shellfire, "he was hit in the head by a piece of shell and died a few minutes later".

== Career statistics ==
Appearances and goals by club, season and competition
Club	Season	League			FA Cup		Total	
Club	Season	Division	Apps	Goals	Apps	Goals	Apps	Goals
Aston Villa	1911–12	First Division	6	0	2	0	8	0
Career total			6	0	2	0	8	0
