= International Football League Board =

The International Football League Board or IFLB, informally the Inter-League Board, was a board of leading professional association football leagues in Britain and Ireland whose main function was to coordinate and enforce policy on transfers of players between clubs in different member leagues. It also organised representative matches between leagues, and imposed restrictions on ownership of multiple clubs across member leagues.

== History ==
The IFLB was founded in 1897 by the Football League and the Scottish Football League to resolve disputes over "poaching" of players in one League by clubs from the other. Inter-league representation matches, first staged in 1892, also came under its control. 1910 saw the introduction of the English League Board governing dealings between the two most significant leagues in England, the Football League and the Southern League. A separate Anglo-Irish Football League Board was established in 1914 by the Football League and the Irish Football League, which later merged with the IFLB. Thus all the top leagues in all four Home Nations were covered, with the Football League covering both England and Wales. Lower leagues, like the Central Football League, were not members and thus not bound by its rules. The Scottish Premier League and the English Premier League were admitted to the IFLB after their breakaways from their respective parent leagues.

The IFLB was parallel to the International Football Association Board (IFAB), formed by the football associations (FAs) of each of the four Home Nations (with the English FA and Welsh FA both on the IFAB). Subsequently, the IFAB was extended to include FIFA, whereas the IFLB did not extend its geographical remit, although the League of Ireland joined after splitting from the Irish League.

In 1911, Liverpool F.C. were fined £250 by the IFLB for signing Bob Pursell from Queen's Park F.C. without permission, though a news report estimated his transfer fee would have been £360.

In the 2003–04 Celtic F.C. season there were disputes over transfers of Colin Healy and Liam Miller to English clubs, because FIFA rules prohibited free transfers of players under 23 whereas the IFLB had an age limit of 24. FIFA asserted its jurisdiction.

The IFLB was dissolved in 2005. A temporary consequence was that inter-league player loans became impossible, until FIFA regulations were subsequently applied.

== See also ==
- Scottish Football League XI
- Irish League representative team

== Sources ==
- Taylor, Matthew (1 January 2005). The Leaguers: The Making of Professional Football in England, 1900-1939. Liverpool University Press. ISBN 9780853236399.
