= Players' Union =

Former trade union of the United Kingdom

The Association Football Players' and Trainers' Union (AFPTU), commonly known as the Players' Union, in the United Kingdom was the original association that became the Professional Footballers' Association. Their stated aims were freedom of movement of players and obtaining the same employment rights as other workers.

The Players' Union was formed at a meeting on 2 December 1907 when Charlie Roberts and Billy Meredith (who had been involved in the AFU) convened the organisation of the Association of Football Players' and Trainers' Union (‘AFPTU’) (which the press called "The Players' Union") at the Imperial Hotel, Manchester. This was the second attempt at the unionisation of professional football players after the failure of the Association Footballers' Union which dissolved itself in 1901.

This Union was formed because the Football League had ratified a maximum wage for footballers in 1901 at £4 (2012: £296) . This severely limited the opportunity to earn wages that allowed the best players in the country to forgo the need to take paid employment outside of football. Until then, individual clubs had set their own wage policies throughout the country.

The Union, basically, led from where the previous AFU had left the situation: that is by challenging the introduction of a maximum wage and the restraint on transfers. The Union were almost ruined financially and membership fell drastically as a result of Kingaby v Aston Villa. They had funded the legal costs of outside right, Herbert Kingaby, but erroneous strategy by the player's counsel resulted in the suit being dismissed.

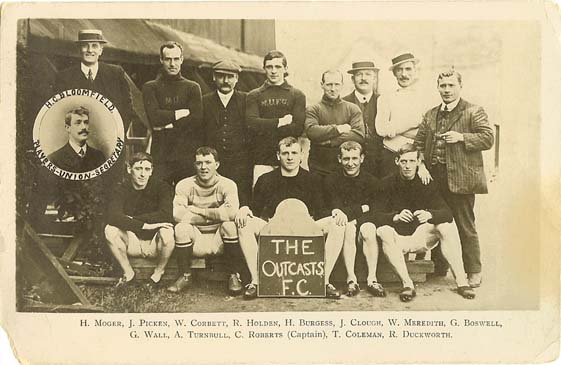
The Manchester United team posing as the "Outcasts F.C." before the 1909–10 season.

The Union's objectives were made clear in 1909, and this caused the Football Association to withdraw their recognition of the Union, which at that time sought to join the General Federation of Trade Unions.

The Union threatened strike action but the Football Association responded by banning those affiliated with the AFPTU sine die.

The Manchester United players continued to strike but the lack of resolve elsewhere would have led to the failure of this movement if it had not been for Tim Coleman of Everton breaking ranks with his colleagues and striking in support of what the press had classified as The Outcasts F.C. at Manchester United Coleman's intervention resuscitated support for the cause and the Union, having regained its strength of numbers, settled for official recognition and the allowing of bonus payments in order to supplement the maximum wage. These were essentially conciliatory gestures; the maximum wage remained a yoke under which players suffered for the next 50 years.
