= Charles Sutcliffe =

British lawyer, football administrator and referee

Charles Edward Sutcliffe (8 July 1864 – 11 January 1939) was a British lawyer, football administrator and referee.

== Football career ==
Sutcliffe played for Burnley during the 1880s, but retired by the mid-decade. He retained a role at the club, joining the committee.

After encouragement by Preston North End's William Sudell, Sutcliffe took up refereeing, and became eligible to officiate Football League matches from 1891. He soon gained a reputation for obstinacy, and did not shy from controversy. In one match between Blackburn Rovers and Liverpool he disallowed six goals. After provoking the ire of the crowd in a match at Sunderland, he reputedly had to sneak out of the ground disguised as a policeman. He stopped refereeing League matches in 1898, though he continued as a linesman for a further decade. For a period of four years at the end of the 19th century, he refereed a number of Home Internationals. In 1908 he was a founder and the first president of the Referees' Association.

Sutcliffe became a Burnley director in 1897, and joined the Football League Management Committee the following year. He immediately proposed that the League should discontinue the test matches, which were used to determine promotion and relegation. The test matches were contested in a round-robin league format comprising four teams – the bottom two from the First Division and the top two from the Second Division. The two teams with the best test match record gained (or retained) First Division status, the other two were demoted. In 1898, Burnley had just gained promotion through the test matches in dubious circumstances. The final test match was between Burnley and Stoke. Other results meant both clubs knew a draw would be sufficient to give them First Division football. Neither team attempted to score, in what the Staffordshire Advertiser called a "fiasco". Sutcliffe proposed that the First Division be expanded by two clubs, thus giving space for Blackburn Rovers and Newcastle United, the two clubs adversely affected by the arranged test match.

In 1905, Sutcliffe, along with Roger Charnley (son of Tom Charnley, the Football Association (FA) President), formed Wigan Town A.F.C. who played in the English Combination and the Lancashire Combination. The club, who played at Springfield Park, folded in 1908.

In 1912, Charles Sutcliffe helped establish the legality of the league's retain-and-transfer system when he successfully represented the club Aston Villa during the Kingaby case. Former Villa player Herbert Kingaby had brought legal proceedings against his old club for preventing him from playing. Erroneous strategy by Kingaby's counsel resulted in the suit being dismissed.

From 1915 until his death in 1939, Sutcliffe was responsible for devising the schedule of fixtures for Football League matches. Using a closely guarded system featuring red and white squares in the manner of a chessboard, Sutcliffe's method created a durable fixture list, the first draft of which usually required only the most minor revisions. For providing the fixture list, the league paid him 150 guineas. Sutcliffe's method, taken on by his son, continued to provide fixtures until 1967, when the process was computerised.

In August 1922, Sutcliffe, in his capacity as a representative of the Football League, opened Doncaster Rovers' Belle Vue ground.

After 38 years on the Football League's Management Committee, Sutcliffe became League President in 1936. This coincided with the League taking a firm stance against football-based gambling, of which the most common type was the football pools. First, advertisement for pools were banned from football grounds, then the League took further action, sparking what became known as the "Pools War". In February 1936, the League announced that the existing fixture schedule was to be abandoned. Fixtures would be announced 48 hours in advance, in an attempt to make it more difficult for pools companies to produce coupons. Sutcliffe, as both a senior League administrator and the man responsible for devising fixtures, was central to the plan. Though Sutcliffe was determined to see the pools companies defeated, the chaos caused by the uncertainty over fixtures meant the scheme lasted just two weeks.

Sutcliffe strongly believed that British football was superior to that played elsewhere, and took an isolationist stance on related issues. When the Home Nations withdrew from FIFA in 1928, Sutcliffe was among those who voted for withdrawal. In response to overseas tours by the Home Nations, he declared "I don't care a brass farthing about the improvement of the game in France, Belgium, Austria or Germany" and accused FIFA's one member one vote system of "magnifying the midgets". Six years later he branded the 1934 World Cup "a joke". His antipathy extended to English clubs who attempted to sign foreign players. When Arsenal attempted to sign Rudy Hiden from Wiener AC in 1930, Sutcliffe wrote "The idea of bringing foreigners to play in league football is repulsive to the clubs, offensive to British players and a terrible confession of weakness in the management of a club". The FA agreed, and introduced legislation the following year which in essence banned foreign players from playing in England. The ruling remained in place until 1978.

== Personal life ==
Sutcliffe was born in Burnley on 8 July 1864 to John Sutcliffe, who worked as a solicitor, and Jane Pollard Brown. One of four sons, he trained as a solicitor and joined his father's practice. His legal qualification came around the same time as his retirement from playing football. With his first wife, Annie, he had two sons and a daughter. Annie died in 1924, and in 1926 Sutcliffe married Sarah Pickup. He died at home on 11 January 1939 aged 74. At the next Burnley match a silence was held, and the crowd sang Abide with Me.

== Bibliography ==
- Clapson, Mark (1992). A bit of a flutter: popular gambling and English society, c. 1823-1961. Manchester: Manchester University Press. ISBN 9780719034367.
- Goldblatt, David (2007). The Ball is Round: A Global History of Football. London: Penguin. ISBN 978-0-14-101582-8.
- Inglis, Simon (1988). League Football and the Men Who Made It. Willow Books. ISBN 0-00-218242-4.
- Taylor, Matthew (2004). "Sutcliffe, Charles Edward (1864–1939)". Oxford Dictionary of National Biography (online ed.). Oxford University Press. doi:10.1093/ref:odnb/64559. (Subscription, Wikipedia Library access or UK public library membership required.)
- Taylor, Matthew (2005). The Leaguers: the making of professional football in England, 1900–1939. Liverpool: Liverpool University Press. ISBN 9780853236399.
