= Walter Watson (footballer) =

English footballer

Personal information
- Date of birth: November 1890
- Place of birth: Sheffield, England
- Date of death: 1956 (aged 65–66)
- Position: Winger

Senior career*
Years	Team	Apps	(Gls)
1911	Worksop Town		
1911–1912	Aston Villa	3	(0)
1912–1913	Rotherham Town		
1913–1914	Kilmarnock	13	(1)
1914–1915	Chesterfield Town	16	(3)
1919–1921	Worksop Town		
1921–1923	Kilmarnock	28	(7)
- * Club domestic league appearances and goals

Walter Watson (November 1890 – 1956) was an English footballer who played as a winger for Worksop Town, Aston Villa, Rotherham Town, Kilmarnock, and Chesterfield Town.

== Career ==
Watson joined Aston Villa from Worksop Town in March 1912. He played three First Division matches in the 1911–12 campaign, and left to join Rotherham Town in July 1913. He later played for Kilmarnock, and Chesterfield Town. He scored three goals in 16 Midland Football League matches for Chesterfield in the 1914–15 season but was suspended after twice missing trains to get to games on time. During World War I he served in the York and Lancaster Regiment and would suffer from shell shock. He also played as a guest for Port Vale in a 1–0 defeat to Manchester City in a wartime league match at the Old Recreation Ground on 19 April 1919. After the war, he rejoined Worksop Town, before returning to Kilmarnock for the 1921–22 and 1922–23 seasons.

== Career statistics ==
Appearances and goals by club, season and competition
Club	Season	League			National cup (Note: Includes FA Cup, Scottish Cup)		Total	
Club	Season	Division	Apps	Goals	Apps	Goals	Apps	Goals
Aston Villa	1911–12	First Division	3	0	0	0	3	0
Kilmarnock	1913–14	Scottish Division One	13	1	2	0	15	1
Chesterfield Town	1914–15	Midland Football League	16	3	4	1	20	4
Kilmarnock	1921–22	Scottish Division One	27	7	1	1	28	2
Kilmarnock	1922–23	Scottish Division One	1	0	0	0	1	0
Kilmarnock	Total		28	7	1	1	29	8
