= Harry Mainman =

English footballer

Personal information
- Full name: Henry Layfield Mainman
- Date of birth: 7 April 1877
- Place of birth: Liverpool, England
- Date of death: 1953 (aged 75–76)
- Position: Centre half

Senior career*
Years	Team	Apps	(Gls)
1896–1897	Everton	0	(0)
1897–1898	Liverpool	0	(0)
1898–1900	Burton Swifts	64	(9)
1900–1901	Reading		
1901–1907	Notts County	130	(0)
Total		194	(9)
- * Club domestic league appearances and goals

Henry Layfield Mainman (7 April 1877 – 1953) was an English footballer who played in the Football League for Burton Swifts and Notts County.
