= Walter Watson (priest) =

Anglican priest (1867–1921)

Walter Clarence Watson (1867–1921) was an Anglican priest: most notably Archdeacon of the Virgin Islands from 1915 until 1916.

Watson was born in Barbados on 26 May 1867. He was educated at Codrington College and ordained in 1891. He was Inspector of Schools in St Vincent then Curate of St George, Grenada. After this he was Priest in charge of St Paul, St Croix then Canon at St John's Cathedral, Antigua. In 1916 he became Archdeacon, residing at All Saints’, St Thomas, Danish West Indies.
