= 1903–04 Woolwich Arsenal F.C. season =

English football club season

Woolwich Arsenal
1903–04 season
- Manager: Harry Bradshaw
- Stadium: Manor Ground
- Second Division: 2nd
- FA Cup: Second Round

In the 1903–04 season, the Woolwich Arsenal F.C. played 34 games, 49 points and 21 wins, and 7, draws and 6 losses. The team finished 2nd in the league and was promoted to the First Division.

== Results ==
Arsenal's score comes first

Win	Draw	Loss

=== Football League Second Division ===
Date	Opponent	Venue	Result	Attendance	Scorers
5 September 1903	Blackpool	H	3–0		
12 September 1903	Gainsborough Trinity	A	2–0		
19 September 1903	Burton United	H	8–0		
26 September 1903	Bristol City	A	4–0		
3 October 1903	Manchester United	H	4–0		
10 October 1903	Glossop	A	3–1		
24 October 1903	Burslem Port Vale	A	3–2		
26 October 1903	Leicester Fosse	H	8–0		
31 October 1903	Barnsley	A	1–2		
7 November 1903	Lincoln City	H	4–0		
21 November 1903	Chesterfield Town	H	6–0		
28 November 1903	Bolton Wanderers	A	1–2		
19 December 1903	Grimsby Town	H	5–1		
25 December 1903	Bradford City	H	4–1		
26 December 1903	Leicester Fosse	A	0–0		
1 January 1904	Stockport County	A	0–0		
2 January 1904	Blackpool	A	2–2		
9 January 1904	Gainsborough Trinity	H	6–0		
16 January 1904	Burton United	A	1–3		
30 January 1904	Manchester United	A	0–1		
27 February 1904	Barnsley	H	3–0		
29 February 1904	Burnley	H	4–0		
5 March 1904	Lincoln City	A	2–0		
12 March 1904	Stockport County	H	5–2		
14 March 1904	Bristol City	H	2–0		
19 March 1904	Chesterfield Town	A	0–1		
26 March 1904	Bolton Wanderers	H	3–0		
1 April 1904	Preston North End	A	0–0		
2 April 1904	Burnley	A	0–1		
4 April 1904	Glossop	H	2–1		
9 April 1904	Preston North End	H	0–0		
16 April 1904	Grimsby Town	A	2–2		
19 April 1904	Bradford City	A	3–0		
25 April 1904	Burslem Port Vale	H	0–0		

==== Final League table ====
Pos	Team	Pld	W	D	L	GF	GA	GAv	Pts	Promotion or relegation
1	Preston North End (C, P)	34	20	10	4	62	24	2.583	50	Promotion to the First Division
2	Woolwich Arsenal (P)	34	21	7	6	91	22	4.136	49	Promotion to the First Division
3	Manchester United	34	20	8	6	65	33	1.970	48	
4	Bristol City	34	18	6	10	73	41	1.780	42	
5	Burnley	34	15	9	10	50	55	0.909	39	

(C) Champions; (P) Promoted

=== FA Cup ===
Round	Date	Opponent	Venue	Result	Attendance	Goalscorers
Intermediate Round	12 December 1903	Bristol Rovers	A	1–1		
Intermediate Round R	16 December 1903	Bristol Rovers	H	1–0		
Round 1	6 February 1904	Fulham	H	1–0		
Round 2	20 February 1904	Manchester City	H	0–2		
