= Arthur Moss (footballer) =

English footballer

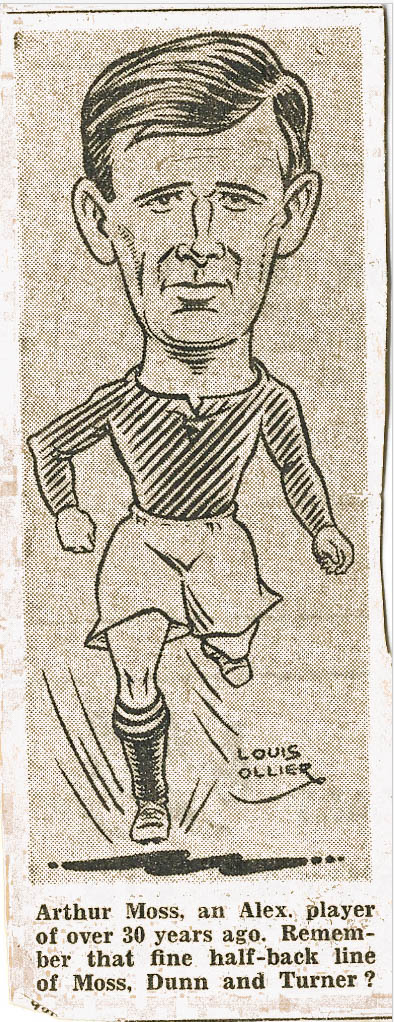
- A contemporary newspaper cartoon of Moss

Personal information
- Full name: Arthur James Moss
- Date of birth: 14 November 1887
- Place of birth: Crewe, England
- Date of death: 3 April 1964 (aged 76)
- Place of death: Stratton St Margaret, England
- Height: 5 ft 8 in (1.73 m)
- Position: Half back

Youth career
- Crewe Central
- Willaston White Star

Senior career*
Years	Team	Apps	(Gls)
- Crewe Alexandra
19??–1909	Whitchurch		
1909–1912	Aston Villa	5	(0)
1912–1914	Bristol City	85	(0)
19??–1919	Runcorn		
1919–1921	Crewe Alexandra	84	(0)
1921–1924	Crewe Alexandra	136	(1)
- * Club domestic league appearances and goals

Arthur Moss (14 November 1887 – 3 April 1964) was an English footballer who played as a half back. He made over 220 Football League appearances in the years before and after the First World War.

== Career ==
Moss was born of farming stock from Cheshire and Shropshire. He was initially trained as a joiner, but later worked at the Crewe locomotive works for the London and North Western Railway as a locomotive fitter. He was skilled as a marksman and won many medals and silver spoons at shooting range competitions. He also played football and was taken on by Crewe Alexandra in the Birmingham & District League. Later, he played for Aston Villa and then Bristol City, He ceased to work at the locomotive works when layoffs became necessary and his foreman indicated that since he had his football he did not need his work as a fitter. After the First World War, during which he served in the Royal Engineers and was wounded in France, being awarded the Croix de Guerre for an attack on a machine gun post, Moss rejoined Crewe Alexandra. He was ever present (42 appearances) at right half in both the 1919–20 and 1920–21 seasons in the Central League as the "Railwaymen" finished 3rd and then runners up before Crewe Alexandra returned to the Football League being elected to the newly formed Third Division North in 1921–22. After retiring from professional football, he continued to work as a fitter at the Crewe locomotive works, which was now owned by the London, Midland and Scottish Railway. After retirement he moved to Pembrokeshire, and then Wiltshire, where he died in 1964. He is buried in Chiseldon, Wiltshire.
