= Arthur J. Moss =

American cardiologist (1931–2018)

- Born: June 21, 1931; White Plains, New York
- Died: February 14, 2018 (aged 86); Brighton, New York
- Known for: Long QT syndrome, sudden cardiac death, MADIT trials
- Medical career
- Profession: Cardiologist
- Institutions: University of Rochester Medical School

Arthur Jay Moss (June 21, 1931 – February 14, 2018) was an American cardiologist.

== Early life and education ==
Moss was born June 21, 1931, and attended Yale University graduating in 1953 with a degree in psychology. He then attended Harvard Medical School and graduated in 1957. After completing his internship at Massachusetts General Hospital, he then served in the United States Navy. In 1961, he joined the University of Rochester Medical School where he completed his training in cardiology in 1966.

While in the Navy, he was the physician involved in the Holter monitoring and interpretations of the astronaut monkey, Miss Baker, one of the first animals launched into space, after the successful flight and landing of a Jupiter rocket; subsequently, he did the same with the first human astronaut.

== Career ==
Moss joined the University of Rochester Medical School faculty in 1966, and became known for his research on long QT syndrome. Moss was later named the Bradford C. Berk, M.D., Ph.D. Distinguished Professor in Cardiology at Rochester, serving until his death in Brighton, Monroe County, New York, on February 14, 2018, aged 86.

== Honors ==
- Glorney-Raisbeck Award in Cardiology, New York Academy of Medicine, 2008
- Golden Lionel Award, Venice International Cardiac Arrhythmias Meeting, 2009
- Distinguished Scientist Award, Heart Rhythm Society, 2011
- University of Rochester's Eastman Medal, 2012
- Pioneer in Cardiac Pacing and EP Award, Heart Rhythm Society, 2017
- James B. Herrick Award, American Heart Association's Scientific Sessions', 2017

== Selected bibliography ==
- Moss, Arthur J.; Osborne, Robert K.; Baue, Arthur E.; Lees, Robert S.; Jamison, Rex L.; Spann, James (4 October 1962). "Closed-Chest Cardiac Massage in the Treatment of Ventricular Fibrillation Complicating Acute Myocardial Infarction: Report of Three Cases with Survival". New England Journal of Medicine. 267 (14): 679–681. doi:10.1056/NEJM196210042671401. PMID 14476523.
- Moss, Arthur J.; Bruhn, Fred (17 February 1966). "The Echocardiogram: An Ultrasound Technic for the Detection of Pericardial Effusion". New England Journal of Medicine. 274 (7): 380–384. doi:10.1056/NEJM196602172740704. PMID 5903122.
- Moss, Arthur J.; McDonald, Joseph (14 October 1971). "Unilateral Cervicothoracic Sympathetic Ganglionectomy for the Treatment of Long QT Interval Syndrome". New England Journal of Medicine. 285 (16): 903–904. doi:10.1056/NEJM197110142851607. PMID 5112730.
- Moss, Arthur J.; Bigger, J.Thomas; Odoroff, Charles L. (May 1987). "Postinfarct risk stratification". Progress in Cardiovascular Diseases. 29 (6): 389–412. doi:10.1016/0033-0620(87)90014-4. PMID 3554364.
- Moss, Arthur J.; Hall, W. Jackson; Cannom, David S.; Daubert, James P.; Higgins, Steven L.; Klein, Helmut; Levine, Joseph H.; Saksena, Sanjeev; Waldo, Albert L.; Wilber, David; Brown, Mary W.; Heo, Moonseong (26 December 1996). "Improved Survival with an Implanted Defibrillator in Patients with Coronary Disease at High Risk for Ventricular Arrhythmia". New England Journal of Medicine. 335 (26): 1933–1940. doi:10.1056/NEJM199612263352601. PMID 8960472.
- Moss, Arthur J.; Zareba, Wojciech; Hall, W. Jackson; Klein, Helmut; Wilber, David J.; Cannom, David S.; Daubert, James P.; Higgins, Steven L.; Brown, Mary W.; Andrews, Mark L. (21 March 2002). "Prophylactic Implantation of a Defibrillator in Patients with Myocardial Infarction and Reduced Ejection Fraction". New England Journal of Medicine. 346 (12): 877–883. doi:10.1056/NEJMoa013474. PMID 11907286.
- Moss, Arthur J.; Hall, W. Jackson; Cannom, David S.; Klein, Helmut; Brown, Mary W.; Daubert, James P.; Estes, N.A. Mark; Foster, Elyse; Greenberg, Henry; Higgins, Steven L.; Pfeffer, Marc A.; Solomon, Scott D.; Wilber, David; Zareba, Wojciech (October 2009). "Cardiac-Resynchronization Therapy for the Prevention of Heart-Failure Events". New England Journal of Medicine. 361 (14): 1329–1338. doi:10.1056/NEJMoa0906431. PMID 19723701.
- Moss, Arthur J.; Schuger, Claudio; Beck, Christopher A.; Brown, Mary W.; Cannom, David S.; Daubert, James P.; Estes, N.A. Mark; Greenberg, Henry; Hall, W. Jackson; Huang, David T.; Kautzner, Josef; Klein, Helmut; McNitt, Scott; Olshansky, Brian; Shoda, Morio; Wilber, David; Zareba, Wojciech (13 December 2012). "Reduction in Inappropriate Therapy and Mortality through ICD Programming". New England Journal of Medicine. 367 (24): 2275–2283. doi:10.1056/NEJMoa1211107. PMID 23131066.
