= Retain and transfer system =

The retain and transfer system was a restriction that existed in England from 1893 until 1963 on the freedom of professional association football players to transfer from one Football League club to another. The system remained in place until the High Court ruled in 1963 that it was an unjustifiable restraint of trade.

== Background ==
In 1885, faced with the threat of a breakaway British Football Association by 31 clubs, the Football Association relented to professional players being paid by their clubs for playing. Even then, the vast majority of players had other employment and only supplemented their wages by playing football.

Soon after, the Football Association introduced a registration system for players. Before that, a player could agree to play one or more games for any football club. After the Football Association recognized professionalism in 1885, it sought to control professional players by introducing a player registration system. Players had to register with a club each season, even if he remained with the same club from the season before. A player was not allowed to play until he was registered for that season. Once a player was registered with a club, he was not allowed to be registered with or play for another club during the same season without the permission of the Football Association and the club that held his registration. However, players were free to join another club before the start of each season, even if their former club wished to retain them.

The need for regular fixtures to earn sufficient revenue to afford player wages led to the formation of the Football League in 1888.

As the Football League grew in popularity, the leading players of the day were in great demand, and commanded ever-increasing wages. Players signed annual contracts with their clubs. If a club wished to retain a player for the following season, it would offer him a new contract. If the player declined the new contract, he could sign a contract with another club, and the player would be registered with the new club. For example, a player might move to a new club if his prospects of winning silverware were greater at the new club, or if the new club was prepared to pay him a higher wage, than at his previous club.

Smaller clubs became concerned about the growing imbalance in the game. They feared that bigger clubs would dominate the league as a consequence of being able to pay higher salaries. The Football League also took the view that a spread of talent was necessary to sustain the interest of spectators in the competition.

== Introduction of the retain and transfer system ==
The Football League decided that restrictions had to be placed on the ability of richer clubs to lure players from other clubs. From the start of the 1893–94 season onwards, once a player was registered with a Football League club, he could not be registered with any other club, even in subsequent seasons, without the permission of the club he was registered with. It applied even if the player's annual contract with the club holding his registration was not renewed after it expired. The club were not obliged to play him and, without a contract, the player was not entitled to receive a salary. Nevertheless, if the club refused to release his registration, the player could not play for any other Football League club.

If faced with such a situation, a player had the following stark choices:

1. Move to a club in the Southern League, a semi-professional league formed in England in 1894, or the Scottish League formed in 1890, where equivalent restrictions on movement had not yet been introduced. However, until the turn of the century, both the standard of play, and wages, were lower in these other leagues compared to the Football League.
2. Quit playing football altogether and return to other full time employment.

Football League clubs soon came to realize that they could demand and earn a transfer fee from any other Football League club as consideration for agreeing to release or transfer the player's registration.

The player registration system came to be known as the "retain and transfer" system.

The following events further entrenched the retain and transfer system:

1. In 1901, the Football League introduced a maximum wage of £4 per week.
2. The same year (1901), the Association Footballers' Union, which had been formed in 1898 to negotiate with the Football League a relaxation of the registration system and to resist the introduction of a maximum wage, was dissolved.
3. In 1910, the Southern League, agreed to recognize the retain and transfer system.

A challenge by Herbert Kingaby in the 1910s against the retain and transfer system in the courts ended disastrously. Kingaby brought legal proceedings against his former employers, Aston Villa, for preventing him from playing. Erroneous strategy by Kingaby's counsel resulted in the suit being dismissed.

The combined effect of the retain and transfer system and the maximum wage was to keep player wages low, until the 1960s.

== End of the "retain" aspect of the system ==
In 1961, the successor to the AFU, the Professional Footballers' Association, successfully brought about the end of the maximum wage.

Two years later, in Eastham v. Newcastle United, the High Court ruled that the retain and transfer system was unjustifiable. At the time, the elements of the system had remained largely unchanged since 1893 and were as follows:

1. The player could re-register for the same club at any time between 1 April and the first Saturday in May. In effect, the contract was simply renewed.
2. The club could retain the player on less favourable terms by serving a notice between 1 May and 1 June giving details of the terms it was offering. If the Football Association considered the offer to be too low it could refuse the retention, but if it felt the terms were reasonable, the player could not sign for any other club. Players were allowed to petition the Football Association with their reasons for wanting to move to another club, but if the Association refused to intervene clubs could retain a player indefinitely.
3. The player could be placed on the transfer list at a fee fixed by the club.
4. If the club did not want to keep the player and did not seek a fee for him, it could release him and he would be free to conduct negotiations with other clubs at any time from the end of June.

In 1959, George Eastham did not sign a new contract with his club, Newcastle United, and requested a transfer. Newcastle United refused his request.

Eastham refused to play for Newcastle United in the 1960–61 season, and found other employment instead. In October 1960, Newcastle United finally agreed to transfer Eastham to Arsenal for £47,500. Nevertheless, backed by the Professional Footballers' Association, which provided financial assistance to pay for his legal fees, Eastham brought proceedings against Newcastle United in the High Court. The case was decided in 1963. In his decision, the judge criticized the "retain" aspects of the system.

In response, the Football League modified the system, dispensing with the "retain" elements of the system. The 'transfer' aspects remained largely unchanged until the Bosman ruling by the European Court of Justice in 1995 and the Webster ruling by the Court of Arbitration for Sport in 2008.
