= Herbert Kingaby =

English footballer

Bert Kingaby
Personal information
- Full name: Herbert Charles Lawrence Kingaby
- Date of birth: 1880
- Place of birth: Clapton
- Date of death: 1934 (aged 53–54)
- Position: Outside right

Senior career*
Years	Team	Apps	(Gls)
1899-1900	West Hampstead		
1899-1900	Queens Park Rangers	0	(0)
1899-1903	West Hampstead		
1903-1906	Clapton Orient		
1905-1906	Aston Villa	4	
1906-07	Fulham	37	(3)
1907-1910	Leyton	67	(17)
1910-13	Peterborough City		
1913-1915	Croydon Common	22	(42)
- * Club domestic league appearances and goals

Herbert Charles Lawrence Kingaby (1880-1934) was an English footballer, an outside right for Clapton Orient, Aston Villa, Fulham and Peterborough City.

He played part-time for Clapton Orient, in the Southern League before being sold to Aston Villa for £300 (2012: £22,000) in March 1906. At the time the fee was undisclosed even to the player. Villa signed Kingaby for the football maximum wage of £4 a week but after two months were unimpressed with his ability. Villa was not willing to lose the £300 by allowing a free transfer. They offered to sell Herbert back at half price but neither Clapton, nor any other club were interested. Kingaby's wage was stopped but he was placed on Villa's retained players' list effectively preventing him earning a living in the English League, so he joined Fulham back in the Southern League.

He rejoined Clapton Orient at the start of the 1910-11 season. That year the Football League and the Southern League agreed mutual recognition of each other's retain-and-transfer system. Villa now disclosed that Kingaby was still on their retained players' list and demanded £350. This prevented a move to Croydon Common but he eventually joined Peterborough City.

== Kingaby case ==
In March 1912, Charles Sutcliffe helped establish the legality of the league transfer system when he was successfully retained by Aston Villa during the Kingaby case before Justice A.T. Lawrence.

Kingaby had brought legal proceedings against Villa for preventing him from playing. The Players' Union funded his legal costs but an erroneous strategy by Kingaby's counsel resulted in the suit being dismissed. The Union were almost ruined financially and membership fell drastically.
