= 1958–59 Aston Villa F.C. season =

English football club season

Aston Villa
1958–59 season
- Chairman: Chris Buckley
- Manager: Eric Houghton; Joe Mercer
- Stadium: Villa Park
- First Division: 21st
- FA Cup: Semi finals

Second City Derby
- 25--17--21

The 1958–59 English football season was Aston Villa's 60th season in The Football League. Villa played in the First Division, the top-tier of English football but were relegated for the second time in their history.

In December 1958, Joe Mercer, wanting to move to another club, resigned and moved to Villa who were bottom of the First Division. Although he led them to the FA Cup semi-finals, they were relegated to the Second Division once again. He moulded a talented young side at Villa and his team became known as the "Mercer Minors".

Local rival "Wolves" achieved the double over Villa, part of a run of seven between 1957 and 1960.

In the second City derby Villa could only manage a draw at home before being defeated at St Andrews.

There were exits for Les Smith, Billy Myerscough, Peter Aldis and Wally Hazelden.

There were debuts for Ron Wylie (196), Gordon Lee (118), Doug Winton (37), John Sharples (13), Ken Barrett (5), Bill Beaton (1), and Jack Willis (1).

== League table ==
Pos	Team	Pld	W	D	L	GF	GA	GAv	Pts	Qualification or relegation
18	Tottenham Hotspur	42	13	10	19	85	95	0.895	36	
19	Leicester City	42	11	10	21	67	98	0.684	32	
20	Manchester City	42	11	9	22	64	95	0.674	31	
21	Aston Villa (R)	42	11	8	23	58	87	0.667	30	Relegation to the Second Division
22	Portsmouth (R)	42	6	9	27	64	112	0.571	21	Relegation to the Second Division

Source: World Football
Rules for classification: 1) Points; 2) Goal average; 3) Goals scored
(R) Relegated

=== Matches ===
23 August 1958	Aston Villa	1–1	Birmingham City	Birmingham
	Stan Lynn (pen 52')	Report		Stadium: Villa Park

25 August 1958	Aston Villa	3–2	Portsmouth	Birmingham
	Billy Myerscough (32'), Johnny Dixon (54'), Peter McParland (64')	Report		Stadium: Villa Park

30 August 1958	West Ham United	7–2	Aston Villa	London
		Report	Jackie Sewell (79'), Les Smith (88')	Stadium: Upton Park

3 September 1958	Portsmouth	5–2	Aston Villa	Portsmouth
		Report	Gerry Hitchens (2'), Les Smith (81')	Stadium: Fratton Park

6 September 1958	Aston Villa	2–3	Nottingham Forest	Birmingham
	Les Smith (55'), Gerry Hitchens (62')	Report		Stadium: Villa Park

8 September 1958	Aston Villa	1–3	Wolverhampton Wanderers	Birmingham
	Gerry Hitchens (6')	Report		Stadium: Villa Park

13 September 1958	Chelsea	2–1	Aston Villa	London
		Report	Wally Hazelden (31')	Stadium: Stamford Bridge

17 September 1958	Wolverhampton Wanderers	4–0	Aston Villa	Wolverhampton
		Report		Stadium: Molineux Stadium

20 September 1958	Aston Villa	1–1	Blackpool	Birmingham
	Billy Myerscough (45')	Report		Stadium: Villa Park

27 September 1958	Blackburn Rovers	2–3	Aston Villa	Blackburn
		Report	Peter McParland (21'), Gerry Hitchens (27'), Les Smith (72')	Stadium: Ewood Park

4 October 1958	Aston Villa	2–1	Newcastle United	Birmingham
	Ken Barrett (35', 53')	Report		Stadium: Villa Park

11 October 1958	Aston Villa	1–4	West Bromwich Albion	Birmingham
	Ken Barrett (13')	Report		Stadium: Villa Park

18 October 1958	Leeds United	0–0	Aston Villa	Leeds
		Report		Stadium: Elland Road

22 October 1958	Aston Villa	1–2	Arsenal	Birmingham
	Peter McParland (39')	Report		Stadium: Villa Park

25 October 1958	Aston Villa	2–1	Bolton Wanderers	Birmingham
	Peter McParland (15'), Stan Lynn (89')	Report		Stadium: Villa Park

1 November 1958	Luton Town	2–1	Aston Villa	Luton
		Report	Gerry Hitchens (35')	Stadium: Kenilworth Road

8 November 1958	Aston Villa	2–4	Everton	Birmingham
	Jackie Sewell (70'), Gerry Hitchens (74')	Report		Stadium: Villa Park

15 November 1958	Leicester City	6–3	Aston Villa	Leicester
		Report	Jackie Sewell (1'), Gerry Hitchens (11', 35')	Stadium: Filbert Street

22 November 1958	Aston Villa	2–0	Preston North End	Birmingham
	Les Smith (pen 24'), Peter McParland (26')	Report		Stadium: Villa Park

29 November 1958	Burnley	3–1	Aston Villa	Burnley
		Report	Gerry Hitchens (63')	Stadium: Turf Moor

6 December 1958	Aston Villa	1–1	Manchester City	Birmingham
	Billy Myerscough (78')	Report		Stadium: Villa Park

13 December 1958	Arsenal	1–2	Aston Villa	London
		Report	Billy Myerscough (43'), Peter McParland (51')	Stadium: Highbury

20 December 1958	Birmingham City	4–1	Aston Villa	Birmingham
		Report	Wally Hazelden (26')	Stadium: St Andrew's Stadium

26 December 1958	Manchester United	2–1	Aston Villa	Manchester
		Report	Billy Myerscough (36')	Stadium: Old Trafford

27 December 1958	Aston Villa	0–2	Manchester United	Birmingham
		Report		Stadium: Villa Park

3 January 1959	Aston Villa	1–2	West Ham United	Birmingham
	Peter McParland (48')	Report		Stadium: Villa Park

31 January 1959	Aston Villa	3–1	Chelsea	Birmingham
	Billy Myerscough (15'), Stan Lynn (17'), Peter McParland (87')	Report		Stadium: Villa Park

7 February 1959	Blackpool	2–1	Aston Villa	Blackpool
		Report	Peter McParland (29')	Stadium: Bloomfield Road

18 February 1959	Aston Villa	1–0	Blackburn Rovers	Birmingham
	Jackie Sewell (55')	Report		Stadium: Villa Park

21 February 1959	Newcastle United	1–0	Aston Villa	Newcastle upon Tyne
		Report		Stadium: St James' Park

7 March 1959	Aston Villa	2–1	Leeds United	Birmingham
	Jackie Sewell (73'), Gerry Hitchens (90')	Report		Stadium: Villa Park

18 March 1959	Bolton Wanderers	1–3	Aston Villa	Bolton
		Report	Gerry Hitchens (27', 33', 80')	Stadium: Burnden Park

21 March 1959	Aston Villa	3–1	Luton Town	Birmingham
	Les Smith (pen 63'), Gerry Hitchens (70', 85')	Report		Stadium: Villa Park

27 March 1959	Tottenham Hotspur	3–2	Aston Villa	London
		Report	Peter McParland (27', 77')	Stadium: White Hart Lane

28 March 1959	Everton	2–1	Aston Villa	Liverpool
		Report	Peter McParland (22')	Stadium: Goodison Park

30 March 1959	Aston Villa	1–1	Tottenham Hotspur	Birmingham
	Peter McParland (22')	Report		Stadium: Villa Park

4 April 1959	Aston Villa	1–2	Leicester City	Birmingham
	Johnny Dixon (65')	Report		Stadium: Villa Park

11 April 1959	Preston North End	4–2	Aston Villa	Preston
		Report	Jackie Sewell (26'), Billy Myerscough (44')	Stadium: Deepdale

18 April 1959	Aston Villa	0–0	Burnley	Birmingham
		Report		Stadium: Villa Park

20 April 1959	Nottingham Forest	2–0	Aston Villa	Nottingham
		Report		Stadium: City Ground

25 April 1959	Manchester City	0–0	Aston Villa	Manchester
		Report		Stadium: Maine Road

29 April 1959	West Bromwich Albion	1–1	Aston Villa	West Bromwich
		Report	Gerry Hitchens (65')	Stadium: The Hawthorns

Source: avfchistory.co.uk

== FA Cup ==
=== Third round ===
The 44 First and Second Division clubs entered the competition at this stage. The matches were scheduled for Saturday, 10 January 1959, although six matches were postponed until later dates. Six matches were drawn and went to replays.

Tie no	Home team	Score	Away team	Date
6	Aston Villa	2–1	Rotherham United	10 January 1959

=== Fourth round ===
The matches were scheduled for Saturday, 24 January 1959, with three matches taking place on later dates. Six matches were drawn and went to replays, which were all played in the following midweek match. Worcester City was the last non-league club left in the competition.

Tie no	Home team	Score	Away team	Date
11	Chelsea	1–2	Aston Villa	24 January 1959

=== Fifth round ===
The matches were scheduled for Saturday, 14 February 1959. Four matches went to replays in the following midweek fixture, with two of these requiring a second replay to settle the tie.

Tie no	Home team	Score	Away team	Date
4	Everton	1–4	Aston Villa	14 February 1959

=== Sixth round ===
The four quarter-final ties were scheduled to be played on Saturday, 28 February 1959. Three of the four games went to replays.

Tie no	Home team	Score	Away team	Date
3	Aston Villa	0–0	Burnley	28 February 1959
Replay	Burnley	0–2	Aston Villa	3 March 1959

=== Semi finals ===
The semi-final matches were played on Saturday, 14 March 1959. Nottingham Forest and Luton Town won their matches to meet in the final at Wembley.

14 March 1959
15:00

Nottingham Forest	1–0	Aston Villa

Hillsborough, Sheffield

== Appearances ==
- Peter McParland, 47 appearances
- Jimmy Dugdale, 47 appearances
- Nigel Sims, 47 appearances, conceded 85
- Gerry Hitchens, 41 appearances
- Vic Crowe, 39 appearances
- Jackie Sewell, 38 appearances
- Les Smith, 35 appearances
- Johnny Dixon, 34 appearances
- Peter Aldis, 33 appearances
- Billy Myerscough, 32 appearances
- Stan Crowther, 29 appearances
- Stan Lynn, 27 appearances
- Ron Wylie, 26 appearances
- Doug Winton, 18 appearances
- Pat Saward, 14 appearances
- Gordon Lee, 14 appearances
- John Sharples, 13 appearances
- Derek Pace, 12 appearances
- George Ashfield, 9 appearances
- Wally Hazelden, 8 appearances
- Roy Chapman, 8 appearances
- Dennis Jackson, 5 appearances
- Ken Barrett, 5 appearances
- Les Jones, 5 appearances
- Ken Roberts, 2 appearances
- Trevor Birch, 2 appearances
- Jackie Hinchliffe, 2 appearances
- Arthur Sabin, 1 appearance, conceded 1
- Tommy Southren, 1 appearance
- Jack Willis, 1 appearance
- Bill Beaton, 1 appearance, conceded 6

== See also ==
- List of Aston Villa F.C. records and statistics
