= 1956–57 Aston Villa F.C. season =

English football club season

Aston Villa
1956–57 season
- Manager: Eric Houghton
- Stadium: Villa Park
- First Division: 10th
- FA Cup: Winners

Second City derby
- 25--14--20

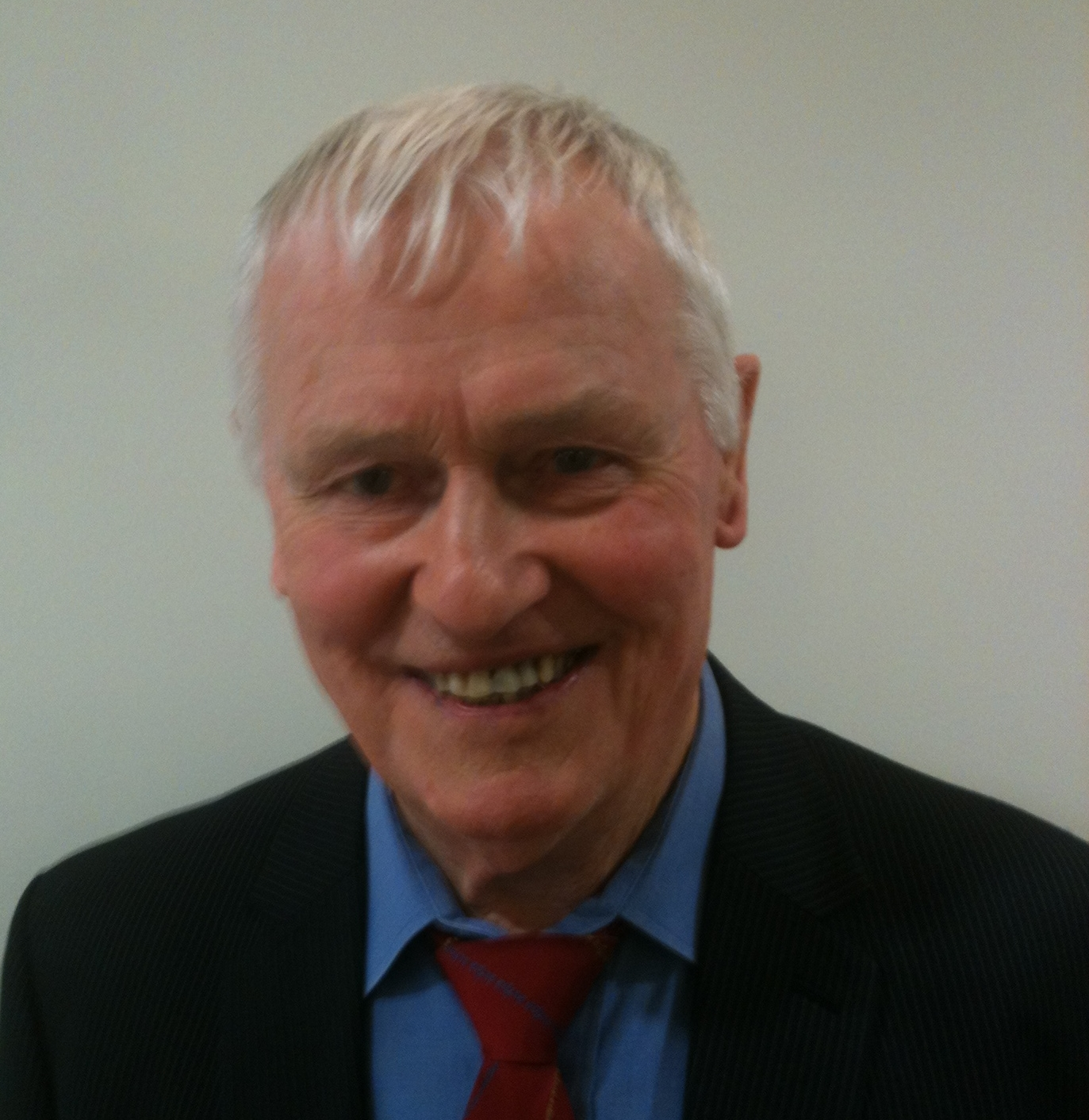
Cup scorer Peter McParland in 2013

The 1956–57 English football season was Aston Villa's 58th season in The Football League. Villa played in the First Division, the top-tier of English football.

In the Second City derby Villa won both matches. In October 1956 they beat Birmingham 3–1 at home with goals by Jackie Sewell, Ken Roberts and Stan Lynn. They beat Birmingham 2–1 away, both Villa goals by Roy Chapman.

There were debuts for Billy Myerscough (64), Stan Crowther (50), Dennis Jackson (8) and Arthur Sabin (2).

== Football League First Division ==
Pos	Team	Pld	W	D	L	GF	GA	GAv	Pts
8	Leeds United	42	15	14	13	72	63	1.143	44
9	Bolton Wanderers	42	16	12	14	65	65	1.000	44
10	Aston Villa	42	14	15	13	65	55	1.182	43
11	West Bromwich Albion	42	14	14	14	59	61	0.967	42
12	Birmingham City	42	15	9	18	69	69	1.000	39

Source: World Football
Rules for classification: 1) Points; 2) Goal average; 3) Goals scored

=== Matches ===
Date	Opponent	Venue	Result	Notes	Scores
18 Aug 56	Charlton	Villa Park	3–1	—	Johnny Dixon (38'), Bill Baxter (53'), OG (84')
22 Aug 56	Albion	Hawthorns	0–2	—	—
25 Aug 56	Manchester City	Maine Road	1–1	—	Les Smith (12')
27 Aug 56	Albion	Villa Park	0–0	—	—
1 Sep 56	Blackpool	Villa Park	3–2	—	Peter McParland (22', 44'), Jackie Sewell (72')
5 Sep 56	Luton	Kenilworth Road	0–0	—	—
8 Sep 56	Everton	Goodison	4–0	—	Jackie Sewell (49', 71'), Johnny Dixon (70'), Les Smith (86')
15 Sep 56	Spurs	Villa Park	2–4	—	Peter McParland (28'), Derek Pace (30')
22 Sep 56	Leeds	Elland Road	0–1	—	—
29 Sep 56	Bolton	Villa Park	0–0	—	—
6 Oct 56	Portsmouth	Fratton	1–5	—	Les Smith (62')
13 Oct 56	Newcastle	Villa Park	3–1	—	Les Smith (6', 14'), Jackie Sewell (9')
27 Oct 56	Birmingham	Villa Park	3–1	—	Stan Lynn (2'), Ken O. Roberts (25'), Jackie Sewell (44')
3 Nov 56	Arsenal	Highbury	1–2	—	Peter McParland (35')
10 Nov 56	Burnley	Villa Park	1–0	—	Jackie Sewell (7')
17 Nov 56	Preston	Deepdale	3–3	—	Les Smith (59'), Stan Lynn (79' pen), Peter McParland (88')
24 Nov 56	Chelsea	Villa Park	1–1	—	Jackie Sewell (85')
1 Dec 56	Sheffield Wednesday	Hillsborough	1–2	—	Peter McParland (45')
8 Dec 56	Manchester United	Villa Park	1–3	—	Pat Saward (73')
15 Dec 56	Charlton	The Valley	2–0	—	Peter McParland (10'), Johnny Dixon (46')
25 Dec 56	Sunderland	Roker Park	0–1	Villa's last Christmas Day fixture	—
29 Dec 56	Blackpool	Bloomfield Road	0–0	—	—
12 Jan 57	Everton	Villa Park	5–1	—	Johnny Dixon (3'), Derek Pace (22', 63'), Jackie Sewell (34'), Les Smith (83')
19 Jan 57	Spurs	White Hart Lane	0–3	—	—
2 Feb 57	Leeds	Villa Park	1–1	—	Derek Pace (54')
4 Feb 57	Manchester City	Villa Park	2–2	—	Les Smith (44'), Peter McParland (67')
9 Feb 57	Bolton	Burnden Park	0–0	—	—
18 Feb 57	Portsmouth	Villa Park	2–2	—	Jackie Sewell (7', 50')
9 Mar 57	Manchester United	Old Trafford	1–1	—	Johnny Dixon (68')
13 Mar 57	Cardiff	Villa Park	4–1	—	Peter McParland (1'), Jackie Sewell (5', 61'), Stan Lynn (84' pen)
16 Mar 57	Arsenal	Villa Park	0–0	—	—
30 Mar 57	Preston	Villa Park	2–0	—	Billy Myerscough (40'), Jackie Sewell (83')
3 Apr 57	Cardiff	Ninian Park	0–1	—	—
6 Apr 57	Chelsea	Stamford Bridge	1–1	—	Jackie Sewell (58')
8 Apr 57	Sunderland	Villa Park	2–2	—	Derek Pace (11'), Billy Myerscough (57')
10 Apr 57	Birmingham	St Andrew’s	2–1	—	Roy Chapman (9', 21')
13 Apr 57	Sheffield Wednesday	Villa Park	5–0	—	Jackie Sewell (6'), Billy Myerscough (44'), Les Smith (56'), Peter McParland (79', 83')
15 Apr 57	Burnley	Turf Moor	1–2	—	Derek Pace (45')
20 Apr 57	Newcastle	St James’ Park	2–1	—	Jackie Sewell (70'), Peter McParland (72')
22 Apr 57	Wolves	Villa Park	4–0	—	Johnny Dixon (8'), Les Smith (74', 79'), Jackie Sewell (88')
23 Apr 57	Wolves	Molineux	0–3	—	—
27 Apr 57	Luton	Villa Park	1–3	—	Les Smith (78')

Source: https://www.avfchistory.co.uk/aston-villa/matches/league/1956-57

== FA Cup ==
1957 FA Cup final
- Event: 1956–57 FA Cup
Aston Villa	Manchester United
2	1
- Date: 4 May 1957
- Venue: Wembley Stadium, London
- Referee: Frank Coultas (Hull)
- Attendance: 99,225

The 1957 FA Cup final was a football match played on 4 May 1957 at Wembley Stadium between Aston Villa and Manchester United. Villa won 2–1, with both of their goals scored by Peter McParland. Tommy Taylor scored United's goal. It was Villa's first major trophy for 37 years.

A collision after only six minutes between Villa forward Peter McParland and United goalkeeper Ray Wood, which left Wood unconscious with a broken cheekbone. Wood left the pitch and Jackie Blanchflower took over in goal for United. Wood eventually rejoined the game in an outfield position as a virtual passenger before returning to goal for the last seven minutes of the game.

Villa's victory gave them their seventh FA Cup title, a record at the time, but since passed by three clubs including Manchester United. Villa reached the final in 2000, when they lost to Chelsea, and in 2015, when they lost to Arsenal.

Six of the 11 United players who took to the field for United in this game died in the Munich air disaster nine months later. Two others were injured to such an extent that they never played again. The death of Nigel Sims in January 2018 left Peter McParland as the last surviving member of the winning team.

In December 2007, BBC Four's Timeshift series screened a documentary, A Game of Two Eras, which compared the 1957 final with its 2007 counterpart.

=== Road to Wembley ===
Round 3	Luton Town	2–2	Aston Villa
Round 3 Replay	Aston Villa	2–0	Luton Town
Round 4	Middlesbrough	2–3	Aston Villa
Round 5	Aston Villa	2–1	Bristol City
Round 6	Burnley	1–1	Aston Villa
Round 6 Replay	Aston Villa	2–0	Burnley
Semi-final	Aston Villa	2–2	West Bromwich Albion
Semi-final	(at Molineux)		
Semi-final Replay	West Bromwich Albion	0–1	Aston Villa
Semi-final Replay	(at St Andrew's)		

=== Match details ===
4 May 1957

Aston Villa	2–1	Manchester United
McParland 68', 73'	Report	Taylor 83'

Wembley Stadium, London
Attendance: 99,225
Referee: F. Coultas

Aston Villa	Manchester United

GK	1	(England) Nigel Sims
RB	2	(England) Stan Lynn
LB	3	(England) Peter Aldis
RH	4	(England) Stan Crowther
CH	5	(England) Jimmy Dugdale
LH	6	(Republic of Ireland) Pat Saward
OR	7	(England) Les Smith
IR	8	(England) Jackie Sewell
CF	9	(England) Bill Myerscough
IL	10	(England) Johnny Dixon (c)
OL	11	(Northern Ireland) Peter McParland
Manager:
(England) Eric Houghton

GK	1	(England) Ray Wood
RB	2	(England) Bill Foulkes
LB	3	(England) Roger Byrne (c)
RH	4	(England) Eddie Colman
CH	5	(Northern Ireland) Jackie Blanchflower
LH	6	(England) Duncan Edwards
OR	7	(England) Johnny Berry
IR	8	(Republic of Ireland) Billy Whelan
CF	9	(England) Tommy Taylor
IL	10	(England) Bobby Charlton
OL	11	(England) David Pegg
Manager:
(Scotland) Matt Busby

== See also ==
- List of Aston Villa F.C. records and statistics
