= 1957–58 Aston Villa F.C. season =

English football club season

Aston Villa
1957–58 season
- Chairman: Chris Buckley
- Manager: Eric Houghton
- Stadium: Villa Park
- First Division: 14th
- FA Cup: Third round

Second City Derby
- 25--16--20

The 1957–58 English football season was Aston Villa's 59th season in The Football League. Villa played in the First Division, the top-tier of English football.

FA Cup Holders Villa were knocked out in the third round by Second Division Stoke City in a 2nd replay.

There were debuts for Gerry Hitchens (132), Wally Hazelden (17), and Les Jones (5), Jackie Hinchliffe (2).

== First Division ==
Pos	Team	Pld	W	D	L	GF	GA	GAv	Pts	Qualification or relegation
12	Arsenal	42	16	7	19	73	85	0.859	39	
13	Birmingham City	42	14	11	17	76	89	0.854	39	Qualification for the Inter-Cities Fairs Cup first round
14	Aston Villa	42	16	7	19	73	86	0.849	39	
15	Bolton Wanderers	42	14	10	18	65	87	0.747	38	
16	Everton	42	13	11	18	65	75	0.867	37	

Source: World Football
Rules for classification: 1) Points; 2) Goal average; 3) Goals scored

Matches

24 August 1957	Birmingham City	3–1	Aston Villa	St Andrew's
		Report	Peter McParland (24')
Note: The season commenced on 24 August 1957 with a 1–3 defeat away to local rivals, Birmingham City with the home team recording its highest home attendance for the entire season with 50,780 spectators.

26 August 1957	Aston Villa	2–0	Leeds United	Villa Park
	Peter McParland (78'), Jackie Sewell (85')	Report
Note:

31 August 1957	Aston Villa	0–1	Everton	Villa Park
		Report
Note:

4 September 1957	Leeds United	4–0	Aston Villa	Elland Road
		Report
Note:

7 September 1957	Sunderland	1–1	Aston Villa	Roker Park
		Report	Roy Chapman (70')
Note:

14 September 1957	Aston Villa	2–0	Luton Town	Villa Park
	Peter McParland (39'), Johnny Dixon (63')	Report
Note:

16 September 1957	Wolverhampton Wanderers	2–1	Aston Villa	Molineux
		Report	Peter McParland (5')
Note: Local rival "Wolves" achieved the double over Villa, part of a run of seven between 1957 and 1960.

21 September 1957	Blackpool	1–1	Aston Villa	Bloomfield Road
		Report	Peter McParland (44')
Note:

23 September 1957	Aston Villa	2–3	Wolverhampton Wanderers	Villa Park
	Own goal (40'), Peter McParland (pen 85')	Report
Note: Local rivals "Wolves" achieved the double over Villa, part of a run of seven between 1957 and 1960.

28 September 1957	Aston Villa	5–1	Leicester City	Villa Park
	Jackie Sewell (17', 25'), Tommy Southren (24'), Stan Lynn (pen 40'), Peter McParland (88')	Report
Note:

2 October 1957	Arsenal	4–0	Aston Villa	Highbury
		Report
Note:

5 October 1957	Manchester United	4–1	Aston Villa	Old Trafford
		Report	Derek Pace (55')
Note:

12 October 1957	Chelsea	4–2	Aston Villa	Stamford Bridge
		Report	Jackie Sewell (59'), Peter McParland (81')
Note:

19 October 1957	Aston Villa	4–3	Newcastle United	Villa Park
	Billy Myerscough (40'), Johnny Dixon (43'), Derek Pace (63'), Jackie Sewell (67')	Report
Note:

26 October 1957	Burnley	3–0	Aston Villa	Turf Moor
		Report

2 November 1957	Aston Villa	2–1	Portsmouth	Villa Park
	Tommy Southren (5'), Derek Pace (9')	Report

9 November 1957	West Bromwich Albion	3–2	Aston Villa	The Hawthorns
		Report	Wally Hazelden (17'), Stan Crowther (65')

16 November 1957	Aston Villa	1–1	Tottenham Hotspur	Villa Park
	Jackie Sewell (52')	Report

23 November 1957	Nottingham Forest	4–1	Aston Villa	City Ground
		Report	Stan Crowther (23')

30 November 1957	Aston Villa	2–2	Preston North End	Villa Park
	Stan Lynn (pen 22'), Peter McParland (83')	Report

7 December 1957	Sheffield Wednesday	2–5	Aston Villa	Hillsborough
		Report	Wally Hazelden (32', 44'), Stan Crowther (38', 53'), Peter McParland (85')

14 December 1957	Aston Villa	1–2	Manchester City	Villa Park
	Peter McParland (77')	Report

21 December 1957	Aston Villa	0–2	Birmingham City	Villa Park
		Report
Note: In the return match of the Second City derby, Villa were beaten 2–0 at home. Gerry Hitchens made his debut.

26 December 1957	Aston Villa	3–0	Arsenal	Villa Park
	Own goal (8'), Stan Lynn (29'), Gerry Hitchens (85')	Report

28 December 1957	Everton	1–2	Aston Villa	Goodison Park
		Report	Gerry Hitchens (11', 61')

11 January 1958	Aston Villa	5–2	Sunderland	Villa Park
	Stan Lynn (5', 29', 41'), Billy Myerscough (10'), Jackie Sewell (33')	Report

18 January 1958	Luton Town	3–0	Aston Villa	Kenilworth Road
		Report

1 February 1958	Aston Villa	1–1	Blackpool	Villa Park
	Peter McParland (21')	Report

8 February 1958	Leicester City	6–1	Aston Villa	Filbert Street
		Report	Tommy Southren (27')

22 February 1958	Aston Villa	1–3	Chelsea	Villa Park
	Peter McParland (75')	Report

1 March 1958	Newcastle United	2–4	Aston Villa	St James' Park
		Report	Les Smith (9'), Gerry Hitchens (16', 90'), Jimmy Dugdale (89')

8 March 1958	Aston Villa	3–0	Burnley	Villa Park
	Stan Lynn (pen 26'), Peter McParland (36', 87')	Report

15 March 1958	Portsmouth	1–0	Aston Villa	Fratton Park
		Report

29 March 1958	Tottenham Hotspur	6–2	Aston Villa	White Hart Lane
		Report	Jackie Sewell (27'), Peter McParland (57')

31 March 1958	Aston Villa	3–2	Manchester United	Villa Park
	Billy Myerscough (35'), Gerry Hitchens (58'), Jackie Sewell (89')	Report

4 April 1958	Bolton Wanderers	4–0	Aston Villa	Burnden Park
		Report

5 April 1958	Aston Villa	2–1	West Bromwich Albion	Villa Park
	Billy Myerscough (23'), Peter McParland (51')	Report

8 April 1958	Aston Villa	4–0	Bolton Wanderers	Villa Park
	Stan Lynn (8'), Gerry Hitchens (21'), Jackie Sewell (66'), Own goal (77')	Report

12 April 1958	Preston North End	1–1	Aston Villa	Deepdale
		Report	Billy Myerscough (24')

19 April 1958	Aston Villa	2–0	Sheffield Wednesday	Villa Park
	Gerry Hitchens (58', 80')	Report

26 April 1958	Manchester City	1–2	Aston Villa	Maine Road
		Report	Les Smith (19'), Jackie Sewell (31')

30 April 1958	Aston Villa	1–1	Nottingham Forest	Villa Park
	Gerry Hitchens (16')	Report

== FA Cup ==
The 44 First and Second Division clubs entered the competition at this stage. The matches were scheduled for Saturday, 4 January 1958, although the York City–Birmingham City match was postponed until the following midweek fixture. Six matches were drawn and went to replays, with one of these requiring a second replay.

Leeds United and Cardiff City were meeting in this round at Elland Road for the third consecutive year, with the Welsh club winning each of the matches by the same 2-1 scoreline. Hereford United and Yeovil Town were the last non-League sides left in the competition.

Tie no	Home team	Score	Away team	Date	Attendance
30	Stoke City	1–1	Aston Villa	4 January 1958	45,800
Replay	Aston Villa	3–3	Stoke City	8 January 1958	38,939
Replay	Stoke City	2–0	Aston Villa	13 January 1958	

== Charity Shield ==
Villa were beaten by Manchester United in the 1957 FA Charity Shield.

== Players ==
- Peter McParland, 45 appearances
- Nigel Sims, 45 appearances, conceded 96
- Stan Lynn, 44 appearances
- Pat Saward, 43 appearances
- Jimmy Dugdale, 41 appearances
- Jackie Sewell, 40 appearances
- Les Smith, 33 appearances
- Peter Aldis, 33 appearances
- Stan Crowther, 29 appearances
- Vic Crowe, 26 appearances
- Billy Myerscough, 25 appearances
- Gerry Hitchens, 22 appearances
- Johnny Dixon, 14 appearances
- Derek Pace, 12 appearances
- Tommy Southren, 11 appearances
- Wally Hazelden, 11 appearances
- George Ashfield, 9 appearances
- Roy Chapman, 8 appearances
- Les Jones, 5 appearances
- Ken Roberts, 2 appearances
- Trevor Birch, 2 appearances
- Jackie Hinchliffe, 2 appearances
- Dennis Jackson, 1 appearance
- Arthur Sabin, 1 appearance, conceded 1
- Roy Pritchard, 1 appearance
- Jett Pavars, 1 appearance
