= 1957 FA Charity Shield =

- Event: FA Charity Shield
Manchester United	Aston Villa
4	0
- Date: 22 October 1957
- Venue: Old Trafford, Manchester
- Referee: Kevin Howley (Middlesbrough)
- Attendance: 27,923

The 1957 FA Charity Shield was the 35th FA Charity Shield, an annual football match held between the winners of the previous season's Football League and FA Cup competitions. The match was contested by Manchester United, who had won the 1956–57 Football League, and Aston Villa, who had won the 1956–57 FA Cup, at Old Trafford, Manchester, on 22 October 1957. Manchester United won the match 4–0, with Tommy Taylor scoring a hat-trick and Johnny Berry adding a penalty.

== Match details ==
22 October 1957

Manchester United	4–0	Aston Villa
Taylor 50', 54', 70'; Berry 87' (pen.)

Old Trafford, Manchester
Attendance: 27,923
Referee: Kevin Howley (Middlesbrough)

Manchester United	Aston Villa

GK	1	(England) Ray Wood
RB	2	(England) Bill Foulkes
LB	3	(England) Roger Byrne (c)
RH	4	(England) Freddie Goodwin
CH	5	(Northern Ireland) Jackie Blanchflower
LH	6	(England) Duncan Edwards
OR	7	(England) Johnny Berry
IR	8	(Republic of Ireland) Billy Whelan
CF	9	(England) Tommy Taylor
IL	10	(England) Dennis Viollet
OL	11	(England) David Pegg
Manager:
(Scotland) Matt Busby

GK	1	(England) Nigel Sims
RB	2	(England) Stan Lynn
LB	3	(England) Peter Aldis
RH	4	(England) Stan Crowther
CH	5	(England) Jimmy Dugdale
LH	6	(Republic of Ireland) Pat Saward
OR	7	(England) Les Smith
IR	8	(England) Jackie Sewell
CF	9	(England) Derek Pace
IL	10	(England) Bill Myerscough
OL	11	(Northern Ireland) Peter McParland (c)
Manager:
(England) Eric Houghton

== See also ==
- 1956–57 Football League
- 1956–57 FA Cup
