= 1954–55 Aston Villa F.C. season =

English football club season

Aston Villa
1954–55 season
- Manager: Eric Houghton
- First Division: 6th
- FA Cup: Fourth round

Aston Villa played the 1954–55 English football season in the Football League First Division, the top-tier of English football.

The FA Cup fourth round matches were scheduled for Saturday, 29 January 1955. Four matches were drawn and went to replays, which were all played in the following midweek match. Once again, there was a tie which went to four replays, this time between Doncaster Rovers and Aston Villa. Rovers finally won the fixture in the fifth match, with an aggregated score of 6–4.

There were debuts for Vic Crowe (350), Tommy Southren (72), Eddie Follan (36), Trevor Birch (22), Ray Hogg (21), Mike Pinner (4), Nobby Clarke (1), and Arthur Proudler (1).

== Table ==
Pos	Team	Pld	W	D	L	GF	GA	GAv	Pts
4	Sunderland	42	15	18	9	64	54	1.185	48
5	Manchester United	42	20	7	15	84	74	1.135	47
6	Aston Villa	42	20	7	15	72	73	0.986	47
7	Manchester City	42	18	10	14	76	69	1.101	46
8	Newcastle United	42	17	9	16	89	77	1.156	43

Source: World Football
Rules for classification: 1) Points; 2) Goal average; 3) Goals scored

== See also ==
- List of Aston Villa F.C. records and statistics
