= Hazelden (surname) =

Hazelden is a surname. Notable people with the surname include:

- Hedley Hazelden (1915–2001), British test pilot
- Wally Hazelden (1941–2019), English footballer
