= William Beaton =

William Beaton may refer to:

- William S. Beaton (1896–1956), mayor of Sudbury, Ontario
- Bill Beaton (born 1935), Scottish footballer
- William Betoun, or Beaton (died 1620), Scottish embroiderer
