= Cup-tied =

Restriction on transfers of footballers

In association football, a player who has appeared for a football club during a knockout cup but subsequently transfers to another club is ineligible to play for the new club in the remainder of that season's cup competition. Such a player is said to be cup-tied, i.e. tied to their original club for the duration of the cup tournament. They become eligible for their new club in the following season.

The rule is intended to prevent teams which progress in the competition buying talented players from teams which have already been eliminated, in an attempt to increase their chances of winning. It also discourages players whose chief priority is winning a trophy from requesting a transfer once their team has been eliminated from the competition. Since the introduction of transfer windows, which the cup-tied rule pre-dates, some have criticised the rule as outdated. Nevertheless, it remains widely applied.

Almost all cup competitions worldwide operate a cup-tied rule, but leagues do not (as leagues do not eliminate teams during the season). Cup-tied players are only prevented from playing in that specific competition, so for example a player who is cup-tied in the FA Cup may still be eligible to play in the League Cup (or vice versa). UEFA competitions are an exception: because teams can switch between the UEFA Champions League and UEFA Europa League (Note: Despite the names, both of these are cup competitions. They each incorporate a mini-league stage, but all other rounds are a knock-out tournament. Both competitions operate by progressively eliminating teams, which is the underlying cause of the cup-tied rule.) during the season, UEFA has a more complex system for determining whether a player is cup-tied in one or both of those competitions.

== The cup-tied rule ==
In almost all domestic and international club cup competitions, any player who makes an appearance for a club at any stage of the competition is "tied" to that club for all future matches during that season in the same competition. This prevents a wealthy team still in the competition from gaining an unfair advantage by signing talented players from clubs that may have lost out in earlier rounds, in an attempt to increase their cup chances.

The rule applies to individual cup competitions, such that a player who plays in the English FA Cup, but not the EFL Cup, for example, is cup-tied only in the former competition. If the player signs for a new club in the same season, they are thus eligible for the EFL Cup but not the FA Cup.

Breaching the cup-tied rule can result in a result being declared invalid, with serious consequences for the offending club. Governing bodies usually reserve the right to waive the rule but do so only in exceptional circumstances.

=== UEFA competitions ===
UEFA operates European club football competitions, primarily the UEFA Champions League and UEFA Europa League. UEFA's regulations state that, with a few exceptions, players who play in any European club competition are subsequently cup-tied with respect to all European football for the remainder of the season. On 27 March 2018, UEFA announced that it would phase out the cup-tied rule for the Champions League and Europa League, starting in the 2018–2019 season.

The main current exception is the UEFA Super Cup, contested by the winners of the previous seasons' Champions League and Europa League. As this is effectively a prestige friendly with only one round, the cup-tied rule is seen as unnecessary. Representing a club in this fixture does not affect a player's eligibility in other UEFA competitions. Similarly, cup-tying did not apply to matches in the now-defunct pre-season UEFA Intertoto Cup, up to the semi-final round.

A further exemption applies: one player per club who would normally be cup-tied can be registered and eligible to play, so long as their previous club did not field that player in the same competition. This means that players can represent two clubs in the Europa League and Champions League, but only a maximum of one player per club. However, if the first club switches into the same competition (e.g. transfers from the Champions League to the Europa League prior to the League Phase), the transferred player becomes ineligible. This can lead to some complex situations.

In 2024, one of UEFA's changes to the Champions League format made these complex situations less likely. In addition to replacing the group stage with a League Phase, they abolished the route from the Champions League to the Europa League via the League Phase/group stage. Teams which fail to advance out of the League Phase in the Champions League by finishing 25th or lower are eliminated from further European competition for the remainder of the season.

=== Criticism ===
The cup-tied rule comes in for criticism from various fans and media pundits, particularly when a high-profile player is ineligible for significant matches. Some argue that the rule is antiquated and that since the introduction of transfer windows, clubs cannot buy players solely for cup matches, but will only do so for the league, where there is no cup-tied rule.

== Examples ==
In the 2008 FA Cup Final against Cardiff City, and in previous rounds, former Portsmouth player Jermain Defoe was cup-tied and was unable to play. Portsmouth won the cup final 1–0. There were similar cases with Earl Barrett's transfer to 1995 FA Cup winners Everton from Aston Villa, while beaten finalists Manchester United were unable to select Andy Cole, as he had played for Newcastle United in the third round a few days before his transfer.

In 2006, Robbie Fowler was cup-tied for the victorious Liverpool team after his mid-season return to Anfield from Manchester City.

In February 1993, Arsenal re-signed defender Martin Keown from Everton, nearly seven years after he had left the club. They went on to win the League Cup and FA Cup that season, but Keown was unable to play in either of the finals, having already played in both competitions for Everton.

In January 1991, defender Viv Anderson was sold to Sheffield Wednesday by Manchester United, and three months later the two teams met in the League Cup final. Sheffield Wednesday won the game, but Anderson had been unable to play, for he had appeared—and scored—in a second-round tie for Manchester United six months earlier.

In another instance, Ronaldo bought out his contract with Real Madrid to move to Milan; he was cup-tied to Madrid in the Champions League. Milan went on to win the tournament, but Ronaldo was not allowed to play in any of their games. Andrei Arshavin was cup-tied in the Champions League after moving to Arsenal during the January 2009 transfer window, having earlier represented Zenit St. Petersburg in the group stage of that competition. In another example concerning Liverpool, this time in the UEFA Champions League, Fernando Morientes was cup-tied for their games leading up to and including the final of the competition in 2005, which Liverpool won. This was due to Morientes playing in the group stage of the competition with Real Madrid.

=== Enforcement ===
In the 1999–2000 Football League Cup, West Ham United were ordered to replay a match they had won against Aston Villa, after bringing on as a substitute Emmanuel Omoyinmi, who had appeared for Gillingham in an earlier round. West Ham lost the replay.

A notable example of non-enforcement was in the 1957–58 FA Cup. Stan Crowther and Ernie Taylor would normally have been cup-tied and thus ineligible to play for Manchester United. However, they were granted an exemption and allowed to play because the club had suffered the Munich air disaster earlier that season. In that air crash, eight United players died and two others were so seriously injured that they never played again, while five others had still not fully recovered from their injuries when the following match was played. The Football Association therefore waived the cup-tied rule.

=== UEFA ===
UEFA's rules regarding their linked competitions and potential exceptions can lead to some complex situations. This was the case with Alan Hutton, who could not play in Europe for Tottenham Hotspur following his former club Rangers' coming third in their Champions League group, which meant they switched to the Europa League for the remainder of the competition. Had Rangers come first, second, or fourth in their group, Hutton would have been able to play for Tottenham.

Another case came in 2009, when Real Madrid purchased Klaas-Jan Huntelaar and Lassana Diarra – both of whom had already played European football during the season for Ajax and Portsmouth, respectively – during the winter transfer window. Because of UEFA rules, Real Madrid could only pick one of these players, and ended up selecting Diarra for their European roster. Despite the rule, Real Madrid attempted to circumvent the restriction, to no avail.

== Manipulation ==
Football managers can sometimes decide whether to field a player in order to deliberately cup-tie (or avoid cup-tying) the player. This can be used to manipulate their value on the transfer market for the remainder of the season, because it affects whether any potential new club can field them in the cup. There are two major motivations for deciding to cup-tie a player or not:

=== To increase a player's value ===
A team that wishes to transfer a player may deliberately choose not to field them in cup competitions to ensure they are not cup-tied, increasing the player's usefulness to a club that is still involved in the same competition.

Two examples of this were in the 2004–05 and 2005–06 seasons, both of which involved English Premier League club Liverpool. In 2004–05, Liverpool's Michael Owen sat out of his club's Champions League games so that other top European teams would be able to sign him; he subsequently transferred to Real Madrid.

The following season, Liverpool manager Rafael Benítez again decided to keep one of his players, Milan Baroš, out of Liverpool's squad for their 2005–06 UEFA Champions League ties in order to retain his value to clubs interested in purchasing the Czech striker's services. This time the manipulation was less successful: Baroš eventually moved to Aston Villa, a club who were not involved in the Champions League and therefore gained no benefit from Baroš not being cup-tied.

=== To discourage transfer interest ===
Similarly, although less often, a team may deliberately cup-tie a player to discourage attempts (by the player or interested clubs) to transfer them during that season. This only applies if the player would not otherwise make it onto the team – it can be achieved by bringing them on as a substitute towards the end of a game. However, this is of limited use for international transfers, where cup-tying only applies if both teams involved in the transfer are competing in the same continental competition (such as the UEFA Champions League or UEFA Europa League).

A variation of this involves national team coaches starting players in order to bind them to the country and prevent call-ups from other National Teams.
