= Jackie Blanchflower =

Northern Irish footballer

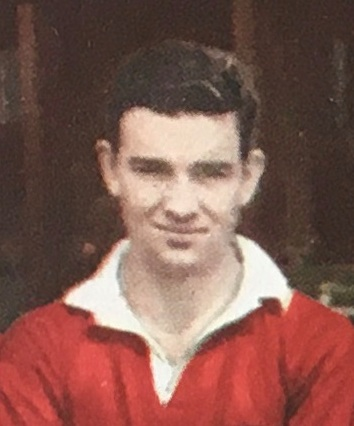

Personal information
- Full name: John Blanchflower
- Date of birth: 7 March 1933
- Place of birth: Belfast, Northern Ireland
- Date of death: 2 September 1998 (aged 65)
- Place of death: Stalybridge, England
- Height: 5 ft 11 in (1.80 m)
- Position: Half back

Youth career
- 1949–1951: Manchester United

Senior career*
Years	Team	Apps	(Gls)
1951–1958	Manchester United	105	(26)

International career
1954–1958	Northern Ireland	12	(1)
- * Club domestic league appearances and goals

John Blanchflower (7 March 1933 – 2 September 1998) was a footballer from Northern Ireland. He graduated from Manchester United's youth system and played for the club on 117 occasions, winning one league title, before his career was cut short due to injuries sustained in the Munich air disaster. He was also capped 12 times at senior level by Northern Ireland.

He was the younger brother of Danny Blanchflower, the captain of the Tottenham Hotspur side that dominated English football in the early 1960s.

== Career ==
=== Manchester United ===
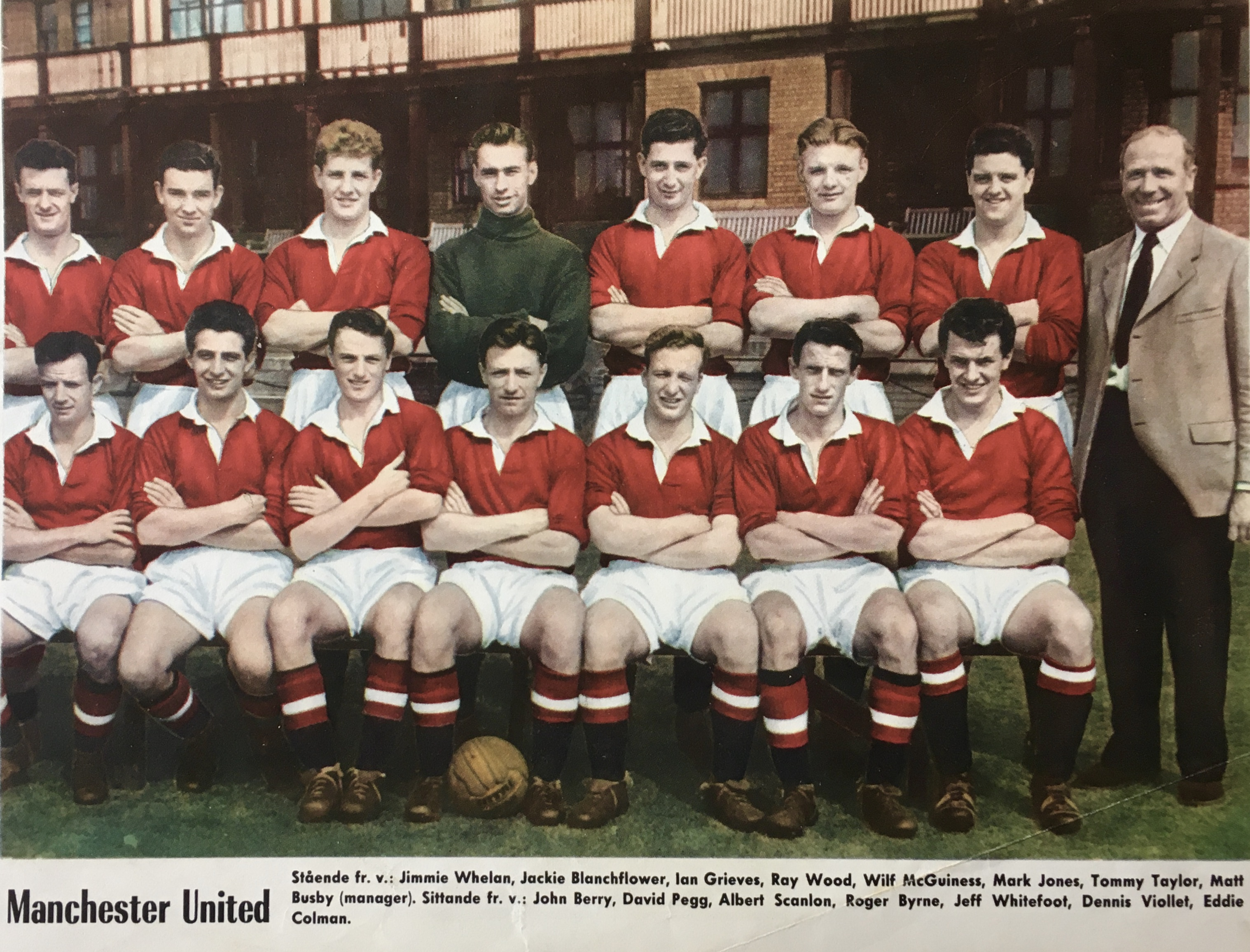
Blanchflower (back row, second from left) in a Manchester United team photo in 1957

Blanchflower's first appearance in a professional game was for Manchester United on 24 November 1951 against Liverpool, away at Anfield. He became a regular first team player in the 1953–54 season, when he played in 27 out of 42 league games and scored 13 goals as an inside-forward.

He helped the club win the league title in 1956, however he missed out on a winner's medal in 1957 after only appearing in 11 games. Nicknamed "Twiggy" by his teammates, he was renowned for his versatility. He began his career as a left-half before the emergence of Duncan Edwards in this position, when he switched to the forward positions, but the Manchester United manager Matt Busby recognised his intelligent positioning sense and aerial power and chose to play him at centre-half by the 1955–56 season, with John Doherty and Billy Whelan now competing for his former position, although he faced fierce competition for the solitary centre-half place due to the presence of Mark Jones. He covered in goal in the 1957 FA Cup final while Ray Wood received treatment for an injury suffered in a collision with Peter McParland, who scored both of Aston Villa's goals as United lost 2–1. Blanchflower also played in some of United's first European Cup fixtures.

He scored 27 goals during his time at the club, most of them during his time as a forward.

=== Munich air disaster ===
On 6 February 1958, the Manchester United team that had travelled to Belgrade for the second leg of a European cup tie had their chartered plane stop in Munich to refuel. Weather conditions caused the plane to crash when the pilot attempted to take-off from Munich airport and 23 of the 44 people on board were killed. Blanchflower was severely injured, suffering from a fractured pelvis and arms and legs, and crushed kidneys, and his right arm was nearly severed. He was in hospital for two months and (although not a Catholic) was read the last rites but survived.

He tried to return to football, but never made a full recovery. Doctors advised him not to return to football because of fears he would damage his kidney and, a year later, Blanchflower retired from football. The Munich air disaster meant that he had played his last game of football when still only 24 years old, having earned 12 caps for Northern Ireland, played well over 100 times for Manchester United and won one league championship medal.

== International goals ==
No.	Date	Venue	Opponent	Score	Result	Competition
1.	8 October 1956	Windsor Park, Belfast, Northern Ireland	Scotland	1–0	2–1	1955–56 British Home Championship

== Personal life ==
The callous attitude of Manchester United towards Blanchflower after injury forced the end of his playing career was revealed by journalist David Conn in a 2000 article in The Independent:

Jackie Blanchflower, who like most of the players, lived in a house owned by the club, had to vacate it. "It was made pretty clear we had to leave," says Jean, his wife. "United were very cold, very harsh, after the crash." By January 1959, Blanchflower was on the dole. Louis Edwards offered him a job in his meat factory, loading pies on to lorries, but he declined, working in a succession of jobs until he later had some success as an after-dinner speaker.

He married his wife Jean in 1956 and eventually pursued studies in finance and began a career as an accountant. He later became an after-dinner speaker and was a regular on the after-dinner circuits until his death from cancer on 2 September 1998. He was 65 years old, and just two weeks before he died he had attended the Munich air disaster testimonial match at Old Trafford.

He was survived by his three children, as well as his wife, Jean, who died in 2002 after a long illness.

He had survived his older brother, Danny (1926–1993).

== Honours ==
Manchester United

- FA Cup runner-up: 1956–57

== See also ==
- List of European association football families
