= 1957 FA Cup final =

- Event: 1956–57 FA Cup
Aston Villa	Manchester United
2	1
- Date: 4 May 1957
- Venue: Wembley Stadium, London
- Referee: Frank Coultas (Hull)
- Attendance: 99,225

The 1957 FA Cup final was a football match played on 4 May 1957 at Wembley Stadium between Aston Villa and Manchester United. Villa won 2–1, with both of their goals scored by Peter McParland. Tommy Taylor scored United's goal. It was Villa's first major trophy for 37 years and prevented United from doing The Double, Matt Busbys' side having been crowned Football League champions having won the First Division.

The final was marred by a collision after only six minutes between Villa forward Peter McParland and United goalkeeper Ray Wood, which left Wood unconscious with a broken cheekbone. Wood left the pitch and Jackie Blanchflower took over in goal for United. Wood eventually rejoined the game in an outfield position as a virtual passenger (slang for a player that is on the field but not proactively participating) before returning to goal for the last seven minutes of the game.

Villa's victory gave them their seventh FA Cup title, a record at the time, but since passed by three clubs including Manchester United, who have thirteen wins. They reached the final in 2000, when they lost to Chelsea, and in 2015, when they lost to Arsenal.

Six of the 11 players who took to the field for United in this game died in the Munich air disaster nine months later; as did a further two players who did not appear in the game, while two others (who both appeared in the game) were injured in the crash to such an extent that they never played again. The only United players who appeared in the final a year later were full-back Bill Foulkes and forward Bobby Charlton. The death of Foulkes in November 2013 and of Charlton in October 2023 leaves no surviving players from the United team, while the deaths of Nigel Sims in January 2018 and Peter McParland in May 2025 leaves no surviving players from the winning Aston Villa team, the latter being the last surviving player to have won the FA cup with Aston Villa, and the last surviving player from the match overall.

In December 2007, BBC Four's Timeshift series screened a documentary, A Game of Two Eras, which compared the 1957 final with its 2007 counterpart.

== Road to Wembley ==
=== Aston Villa ===
Round 3	Luton Town	2–2	Aston Villa
Round 3 replay	Aston Villa	2–0	Luton Town
Round 4	Middlesbrough	2–3	Aston Villa
Round 5	Aston Villa	2–1	Bristol City
Round 6	Burnley	1–1	Aston Villa
Round 6 replay	Aston Villa	2–0	Burnley
Semi-final	Aston Villa	2–2	West Bromwich Albion
Semi-final	(at Molineux)		
Semi-final Replay	West Bromwich Albion	0–1	Aston Villa
Semi-final Replay	(at St Andrew's)		

=== Manchester United ===
Round 3	Hartlepools United	3–4	Manchester United
Round 4	Wrexham	0–5	Manchester United
Round 5	Manchester United	2–1	Everton
Round 6	Bournemouth & Boscombe Athletic	1–2	Manchester United
Semi-final	Manchester United	2–0	Birmingham City
Semi-final	(at Hillsborough)		

== Match details ==
4 May 1957

Aston Villa	2–1	Manchester United
McParland 68', 73'	Report	Taylor 83'

Wembley Stadium, London
Attendance: 99,225
Referee: F. Coultas

Aston Villa	Manchester United

GK	1	(England) Nigel Sims
RB	2	(England) Stan Lynn
LB	3	(England) Peter Aldis
RH	4	(England) Stan Crowther
CH	5	(England) Jimmy Dugdale
LH	6	(Republic of Ireland) Pat Saward
OR	7	(England) Les Smith
IR	8	(England) Jackie Sewell
CF	9	(England) Bill Myerscough
IL	10	(England) Johnny Dixon (c)
OL	11	(Northern Ireland) Peter McParland
Manager:
(England) Eric Houghton

GK	1	(England) Ray Wood
RB	2	(England) Bill Foulkes
LB	3	(England) Roger Byrne (c)
RH	4	(England) Eddie Colman
CH	5	(Northern Ireland) Jackie Blanchflower
LH	6	(England) Duncan Edwards
OR	7	(England) Johnny Berry
IR	8	(Republic of Ireland) Billy Whelan
CF	9	(England) Tommy Taylor
IL	10	(England) Bobby Charlton
OL	11	(England) David Pegg
Manager:
(Scotland) Matt Busby
