= John Sharples (footballer, born 1934) =

English footballer

Personal information
- Date of birth: 8 August 1934
- Place of birth: Wolverhampton, England
- Date of death: 1 September 2001 (aged 67)
- Position: Full back

Senior career*
Years	Team	Apps	(Gls)
- Heath Town
1953–1959	Aston Villa	13	(0)
1959–1964	Walsall	125	(1)
–	Darlaston		
- * Club domestic league appearances and goals

John Sharples (8 August 1934 – 1 September 2001) was an English professional footballer who played in the Football League as a full back for Aston Villa and Walsall. He was born in Heath Town, Wolverhampton.
