= Tommy Taylor =

English footballer (1932–1958)

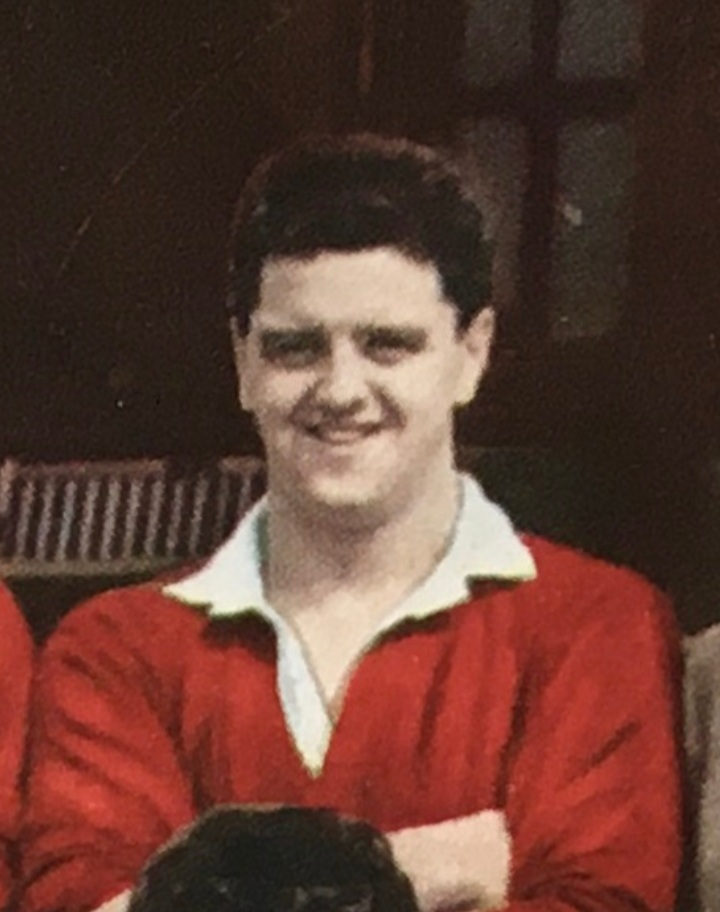
- Taylor in 1957

Personal information
- Full name: Thomas Taylor
- Date of birth: 29 January 1932
- Place of birth: Smithies, West Riding of Yorkshire, England
- Date of death: 6 February 1958 (aged 26)
- Place of death: Munich, Bavaria, West Germany
- Height: 1.93 m (6 ft 4 in)
- Position: Centre-forward

Youth career
- Smithies United

Senior career*
Years	Team	Apps	(Gls)
1949–1953	Barnsley	44	(26)
1953–1958	Manchester United	166	(112)
Total		210	(138)

International career
1953–1957	England	19	(16)
1956	England B	2	(4)
- * Club domestic league appearances and goals

Thomas Taylor (29 January 1932 – 6 February 1958) was an English footballer, who played as a centre-forward and was known for his aerial ability. He was one of the eight Manchester United players who died in the Munich air disaster.

== Career ==
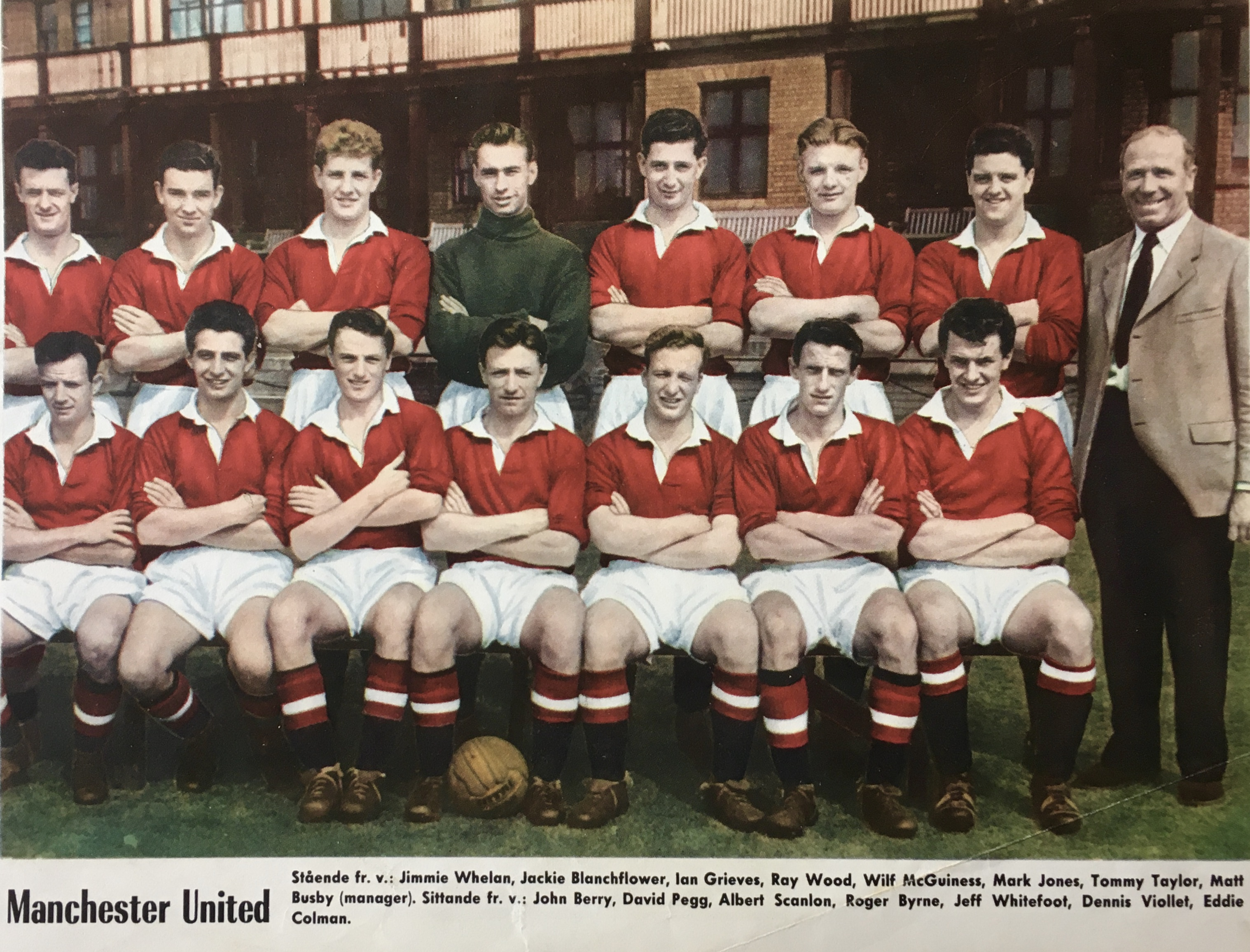
Taylor (back row, second from right) in a Manchester United team photo in 1957

Taylor was born in Smithies, near Barnsley, Yorkshire, on 29 January 1932, one of six children born to Charles and Violet Taylor. He did not pass the eleven-plus and ended up as a pupil at Raley Secondary Modern School, leaving in 1947. He began his football career playing for a team at the colliery where he worked. Two years later, he signed for Barnsley. He made his first-team debut at the age of 18 on 7 October 1950, in a 3–1 home win against Grimsby Town. In his next match, on 4 November 1950, he scored a hat-trick in a 7–0 victory against Queens Park Rangers. In all he scored seven goals in twelve appearances in 1950–51. While playing for Barnsley, he carried out national service in the British Army. It would not be long before Taylor was attracting the interest of First Division clubs.

After scoring 26 goals in 44 games for Barnsley, who had been unable to progress beyond the Second Division, Taylor was transferred to defending First Division champions Manchester United in March 1953 for the unusual fee of £29,999. Matt Busby did not want to burden the 21-year-old Taylor as being a "£30,000 player", so he took a £1 note from his wallet and handed it to the lady who had been serving tea during the negotiations. At the time, he was one of the most expensive players in British football and had also been subject of interest from clubs including Sheffield Wednesday, Derby County and Wolverhampton Wanderers.

He got off to a great start, scoring twice on his debut. By the end of the 1952–53 season, Taylor had scored seven goals in his first 11 games for United. He played a key role in United winning the First Division title 1955–56 and 1956–57 and scored in the 1957 FA Cup final, when United were denied the Double as they lost 2–1 to Aston Villa (winners of the competition for a then record seventh time). He also helped United reach the semi-finals of the European Cup in the 1956–57 season, when they were the Football League's first entrants into Europe's premier club competition.

Such was Taylor's worth that Matt Busby decided to reject an offer of £65,000 for him from Internazionale in the summer of 1957. Had the deal gone through, it would have been one of the most expensive transfer fees in world football at the time.

At the time of his emergence, many saw Taylor as the perfect eventual replacement for Nat Lofthouse in the England side. In all, he played 19 times for England, scoring 16 goals. His first cap came on 17 May 1953 and a week later he found the net for the first time at senior international level in a 2–1 friendly win over Chile. He managed two hat-tricks for the England team, the first in a 5–2 win over Denmark on 5 December 1956, the second in a 5–1 win over Republic of Ireland on 8 May 1957. His last appearance for England came on 27 November 1957 against France, in which he scored twice in a 4–0 win.

Taylor died in the Munich air disaster, aged 26, on 6 February 1958. He had recently become engaged to his fiancée Carol.

He is buried at Monk Bretton Cemetery in his hometown Barnsley.

Taylor holds the all-time Manchester United league goal strike record of 0.67 goals per game.

On 8 July 2011, a blue plaque was unveiled at 22 Great Stone Road in Stretford. This was a boarding house in the 1950s and Manchester United used it as lodgings for their unmarried players – particularly the ones whose families did not live locally. Taylor lived there with players including David Pegg and Mark Jones until these players were killed at Munich, by which time Jones had already married and left the house. A number of players who survived the crash or who were not on the plane also lodged at this house. The landlady was Margaret Watson.

The plaque is sponsored by Stretford High School (which is only 50 yards away) and came about as a result of a local history project undertaken by the pupils at the school. The plaque was unveiled by the cricket umpire Dickie Bird, who was at school with Taylor in Barnsley.

== Career statistics ==
Appearances and goals by club, season and competition
Club	Season	League		Cup		Continental		Other		Total	
Club	Season	Apps	Goals	Apps	Goals	Apps	Goals	Apps	Goals	Apps	Goals
Barnsley	1950–51	12	7	0	0	—		—		12	7
Barnsley	1951–52	4	0	0	0	—		—		4	0
Barnsley	1952–53	28	19	2	2	—		—		30	21
Barnsley	Total	44	26	2	2	—		—		46	28
Manchester United	1952–53	11	10	0	0	—		—		11	10
Manchester United	1953–54	35	22	1	1	—		—		36	23
Manchester United	1954–55	30	20	1	0	—		—		31	20
Manchester United	1955–56	33	25	1	0	—		—		34	25
Manchester United	1956–57	32	22	4	4	8	8	1	0	45	34
Manchester United	1957–58	25	16	2	0	6	3	1	3	34	22
Manchester United	Total	166	112	9	5	14	11	2	3	191	131
Career total		210	138	11	7	14	11	2	7	237	162

=== International goals ===
Scores and results list England's goal tally first. Score after each Taylor goal is shown in bold with asterisk.

#	Date	Venue	Opponent	Minute	Score	Result	Competition
1	24 May 1953	Estadio Nacional, Santiago, Chile	Chile	48'	**1***–0	2–1	Friendly
2	31 May 1953	Estadio Centenario, Montevideo, Uruguay	Uruguay	89'	**1***–2	1–2	Friendly
3	9 May 1956	Wembley Stadium, London, England	Brazil	3'	**1***–0	4–2	Friendly
4	9 May 1956	Wembley Stadium, London, England	Brazil	65'	**3***–2	4–2	Friendly
5	28 November 1956	Wembley Stadium, London, England	Yugoslavia	65'	**2***–0	3–0	Friendly
6	28 November 1956	Wembley Stadium, London, England	Yugoslavia	89'	**3***–0	3–0	Friendly
7	5 December 1956	Molineux Stadium, Wolverhampton, England	Denmark	18'	**1***–0	5–2	1958 FIFA World Cup qualification
8	5 December 1956	Molineux Stadium, Wolverhampton, England	Denmark	20'	**2***–0	5–2	1958 FIFA World Cup qualification
9	5 December 1956	Molineux Stadium, Wolverhampton, England	Denmark	48'	**3***–1	5–2	1958 FIFA World Cup qualification
10	8 May 1957	Wembley Stadium, London, England	Republic of Ireland	8'	**1***–0	5–1	1958 FIFA World Cup qualification
11	8 May 1957	Wembley Stadium, London, England	Republic of Ireland	17'	**2***–0	5–1	1958 FIFA World Cup qualification
12	8 May 1957	Wembley Stadium, London, England	Republic of Ireland	40'	**4***–0	5–1	1958 FIFA World Cup qualification
13	15 May 1957	Idrætsparken, Copenhagen, Denmark	Denmark	71'	**2***–1	4–1	1958 FIFA World Cup qualification
14	15 May 1957	Idrætsparken, Copenhagen, Denmark	Denmark	86'	**4***–1	4–1	1958 FIFA World Cup qualification
15	27 November 1957	Wembley Stadium, London, England	France	3'	**1***–0	4–0	Friendly
16	27 November 1957	Wembley Stadium, London, England	France	33'	**3***–0	4–0	Friendly

== Honours ==
Manchester United

- Football League First Division: 1955–56, 1956–57
- FA Charity Shield: 1956, 1957
- FA Cup runner-up: 1956–57

Individual

- Football League 100 Legends: 1998 (inducted)
