= Ken Barrett (English footballer) =

English footballer

Personal information
- Full name: Kenneth Brian Barrett
- Date of birth: 5 May 1938
- Place of birth: Bromsgrove, England
- Date of death: 7 June 2015 (aged 77)
- Position: Forward

Senior career*
Years	Team	Apps	(Gls)
- Stoke Works
1958–1959	Aston Villa	5	(3)
1959–1963	Lincoln City	17	(4)
1963–1968	Stourbridge		
Total		22	(7)
- * Club domestic league appearances and goals

Ken Barrett (5 May 1938 – 7 June 2015) was an English footballer who played in the Football League for Aston Villa and Lincoln City.

== Career ==
Barrett was spotted by former Aston Villa player Frank Shell as a 15-year-old playing for Stoke Works and invited for a trial for the club which led to him, in 1953, becoming a part-time professional whilst also working as an apprentice press toolmaker at the Longbridge plant. He worked his way up through the ranks at Villa Park, being signed as a professional by Eric Houghton and then making a sparkling debut by scoring both goals in the 2–1 home victory over Newcastle United on 4 October 1958. He followed that by scoring again in his second match, the 4–1 home defeat to West Bromwich Albion on 11 October 1958. In what would turn out to be his fifth and final appearance for the club, a 2–1 defeat at Luton Town on 1 November 1958, Barrett was informed of his selection by being awoken at his Bromsgrove home by a Police Officer and informed "Don't be alarmed son but you need to get your backside up to Villa Park, you're playing for Villa today at Luton, so you'd better get a move on!" Following the dismissal of Houghton as manager in November 1958, Barrett failed to make an appearance for his successor, Joe Mercer, and was released at the end of the 1958–59 season.

He joined Lincoln City in June 1959, debuting in the 2–1 away defeat to Swansea Town on 22 August 1959. After a second appearance he was dropped to the reserves and a call up for his National Service meant it would be 1961 before he appeared for the first team again. His national service saw him in the army and he was initially posted to Blandford Camp, appearing for Weymouth when army commitments allowed, and then Arborfield Garrison before being made a Physical Training Instructor and posted to Aldershot Garrison. He represented the army football team throughout his service, appearing alongside Jim Baxter. Following the completion of his service, he returned to Lincoln City's first team in September 1961 and the 1961–62 season would prove him most productive as he appeared 14 times in the Football League, scoring four times, as well as making one Football League Cup appearance. However, he only managed two appearances the following season which culminated in his release.

He linked up with Stourbridge for the 1963–64 season and in five seasons for the club scored 74 goals in around 200 games before retiring.

== Later life ==
He spent the majority of his life residing in Bromsgrove before moving to Droitwich in his later years. He worked as bookmaker, running the Barrett and Husband shop in Aston Fields. A keen golfer, he was nicknamed the 'Greyhound' at his local course due to the speed at which he completed his rounds, he was also generous with his time to charities including attending regular Aston Villa Former Players Association golf days.
