= 2000 FA Cup final =

English association football match

- Match programme cover
- Event: 1999–2000 FA Cup
Chelsea	Aston Villa
1	0
- Date: 20 May 2000
- Venue: Wembley Stadium, London
- Man of the Match: Dennis Wise (Chelsea)
- Referee: Graham Poll (Hertfordshire)
- Attendance: 78,217

The 2000 FA Cup final was the 119th final of the FA Cup, and the 72nd (excluding replays) and last to be played at the old Wembley Stadium. It took place on 20 May 2000 and was contested between Chelsea and Aston Villa, the latter making its first FA Cup Final appearance since winning it in 1957.

Chelsea won 1–0 to secure their second FA Cup in four years, and their third in all. The goal was scored midway through the second half by Roberto Di Matteo, who had also scored in the 1997 final.

Wembley Stadium closed five months later, and was subsequently rebuilt. The FA Cup Final was played at the Millennium Stadium, Cardiff for the next six years, before returning to Wembley in 2007 (Chelsea would also win that final as well).

== Road to Wembley ==
Chelsea
Third Round	Hull City	1–6	Chelsea
Fourth Round	Chelsea	2–0	Nottingham Forest
Fifth Round	Chelsea	2–1	Leicester City
Sixth Round	Chelsea	5–0	Gillingham
Semi-Final	Newcastle United	1–2	Chelsea
Semi-Final	(at Wembley Stadium)		

Aston Villa
Third Round	Aston Villa	2–1	Darlington
Fourth Round	Aston Villa	1–0	Southampton
Fifth Round	Aston Villa	3–2	Leeds United
Sixth Round	Everton	1–2	Aston Villa
Semi-Final	Bolton Wanderers	0–0	Aston Villa
Semi-Final	(at Wembley Stadium); Aston Villa won 4–1 on penalties		

== Match ==
=== Summary ===
Following a poor quality first half in which few chances were created, the match was brighter in the second, with Chelsea generally having the better of the play. George Weah missed several chances and Dennis Wise had a goal disallowed for offside, while Villa's Gareth Southgate headed wide. On 73 minutes, Roberto Di Matteo scored what proved to be the winning goal, capitalising on an error from Villa goalkeeper David James to put the ball in the net from close range. James came roaring off his line to deal with Zola's free-kick from the left, he fumbled the ball against Gareth Southgate's chest with Di Matteo blasting the rebound into the roof of the net. Villa could not get back in the match, their best chance falling to Benito Carbone, but his tame shot did not test Ed de Goey in goal.

=== Details ===
20 May 2000
15:00 BST

Chelsea	1–0	Aston Villa
Di Matteo 73'	Report

Wembley Stadium, London
Attendance: 78,217
Referee: Graham Poll (Hertfordshire)

Chelsea	Aston Villa

GK	1	(Netherlands) Ed de Goey
RB	15	(Netherlands) Mario Melchiot	(yellow card) 18'
CB	6	(France) Marcel Desailly
CB	5	(France) Frank Leboeuf
LB	3	(Nigeria) Celestine Babayaro
DM	7	(France) Didier Deschamps
CM	16	(Italy) Roberto Di Matteo
CM	11	(England) Dennis Wise (c)	(yellow card) 28'
AM	8	(Uruguay) Gus Poyet	(yellow card) 90'
CF	25	(Italy) Gianfranco Zola		(substituted off) 89'
CF	31	(Liberia) George Weah		(substituted off) 88'
Substitutes:
GK	23	(Italy) Carlo Cudicini
CB	26	(England) John Terry
LB	34	(England) Jon Harley
CM	20	(England) Jody Morris		(substituted in) 89'
CF	19	(Norway) Tore André Flo		(substituted in) 88'
Manager:
(Italy) Gianluca Vialli

GK	1	(England) David James
DF	24	(Wales) Mark Delaney
DF	5	(England) Ugo Ehiogu
DF	4	(England) Gareth Southgate (c)
DF	15	(England) Gareth Barry	(yellow card) 16'
DF	3	(England) Alan Wright		(substituted off) 88'
MF	6	(Netherlands) George Boateng	(yellow card) 90'
MF	10	(England) Paul Merson
MF	7	(England) Ian Taylor		(substituted off) 79'
MF	18	(Italy) Benito Carbone		(substituted off) 79'
FW	9	(England) Dion Dublin
Substitutes:
GK	39	(Finland) Peter Enckelman
DF	31	(England) Jlloyd Samuel
MF	26	(England) Steve Stone		(substituted in) 79'
MF	17	(England) Lee Hendrie		(substituted in) 88'
FW	12	(England) Julian Joachim		(substituted in) 79'
Manager:
(England) John Gregory

Man of the match

- Dennis Wise (Chelsea)

Match rules

- 90 minutes.
- 30 minutes of extra-time if necessary.
- Penalty shootout if scores still level.
- Five named substitutes
- Maximum of 3 substitutions.

=== Statistics ===
	Chelsea	Aston Villa
Goal attempts	5	11
Corner kicks	2	3
Fouls committed	17	14
Offsides	5	2
Yellow cards	3	2
Red cards	0	0

Source: The People
