= Ray Hogg =

English footballer

Personal information
- Full name: Anthony Raymond Hogg
- Date of birth: 11 December 1929
- Place of birth: Lowick, Northumberland, England
- Date of death: 2003 (aged 73–74)
- Position: Full back

Senior career*
Years	Team	Apps	(Gls)
1945–1950	Lowick Rovers		
1950–1954	Berwick Rangers		
1954–1957	Aston Villa	21	(0)
1958–1960	Mansfield Town	11	(0)
1960–1961	Peterborough United	2	(0)
Total		34	(0)
- * Club domestic league appearances and goals

Anthony Raymond Hogg (11 December 1929 – 2003) was an English professional footballer who played in the Football League for Aston Villa, Mansfield Town and Peterborough United.
