= Billy Whelan =

Irish footballer (1935–1958)

Liam Whelan
- Whelan in 1957

Personal information
- Full name: William Augustine Whelan
- Date of birth: 1 April 1935
- Place of birth: Dublin, Ireland
- Date of death: 6 February 1958 (aged 22)
- Place of death: Munich, West Germany
- Position: Inside forward

Youth career
- Home Farm
- 1953–1954: Manchester United

Senior career*
Years	Team	Apps	(Gls)
1954–1958	Manchester United	79	(43)

International career
1956–1957	Republic of Ireland	4	(0)
- * Club domestic league appearances and goals

William Augustine Whelan (1 April 1935 – 6 February 1958), known as Billy Whelan or Liam Whelan, was an Irish footballer who played as an inside-forward and one of the eight Manchester United players who lost their lives in the Munich air disaster.

Whelan was born in Dublin. He was one of seven children born to John and Elizabeth Whelan. His father John was an accomplished centre half-back for Dublin club Brunswick and was instrumental in winning the FAI Junior Shield in 1924. His father died in 1943 when Whelan was just eight years old. He was not a confident flyer and just before the aeroplane took off from Munich, he was heard to say: "This may be death, but I'm ready."

He played Gaelic games, winning a medal for St Peter's of Phibsboro. Dublin GAA club Naomh Fionnbarra successfully had a railway bridge situated near the place of Whelan's birth renamed after him in 2006, while the Naomh Fionnbarra clubhouse also has Whelan's Manchester United membership card.

== Early life ==
William Augustine Whelan was born on 1 April 1935 in Cabra, Dublin to John Whelan, a labourer, and Elizabeth Whelan (née McGuirk). The fourth of seven children, Whelan grew up on St. Attracta Road. His mother was an avid Shamrock Rovers supporter.

== Club career ==
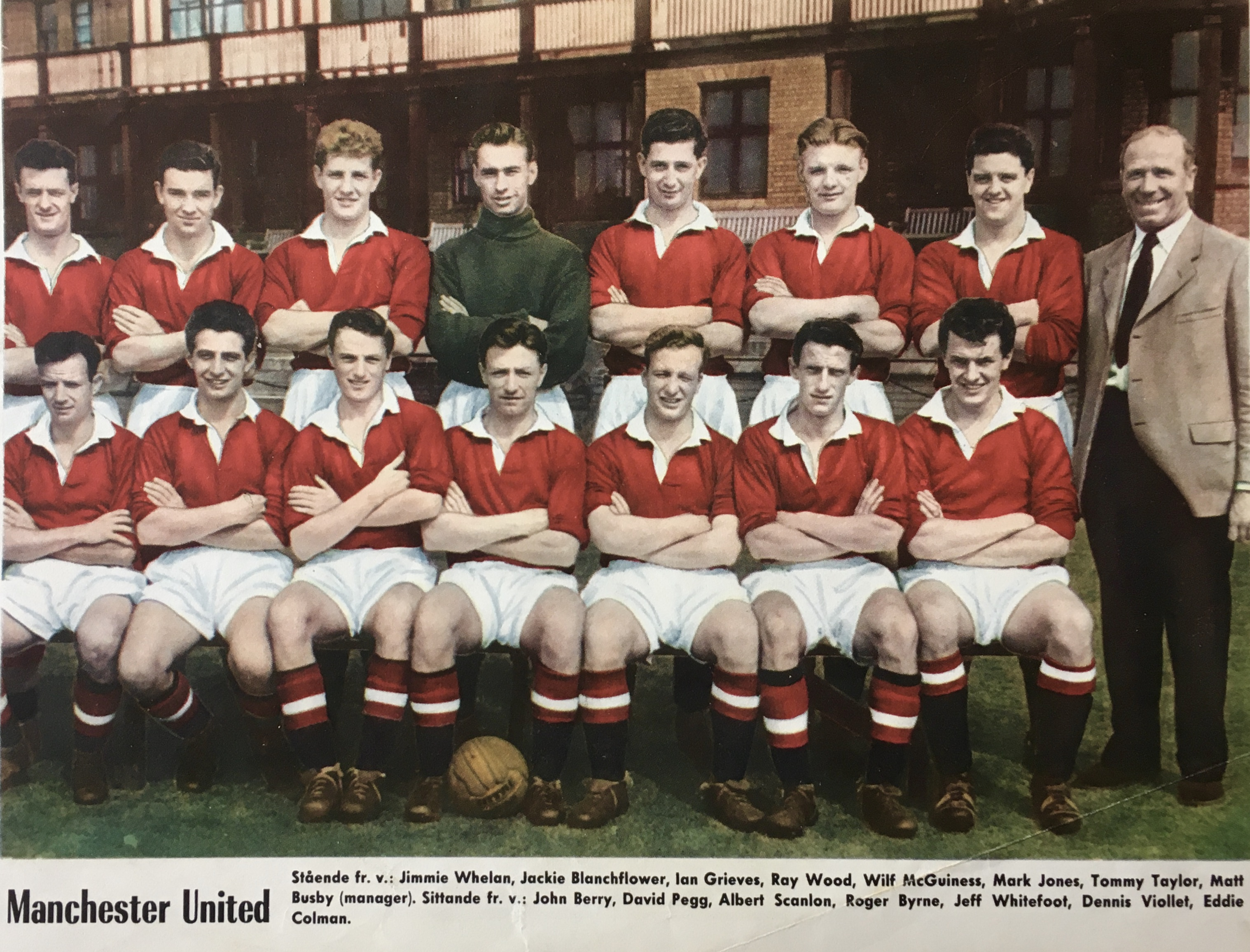
Whelan (back row, far left) in a Manchester United team photo in 1957

Whelan began his career with Home Farm at the age of 12 before joining Manchester United as an 18-year-old in 1953. He was capped four times for the Republic of Ireland national team (including a surprising 4–1 victory against Holland in Rotterdam in 1956) but did not score. His brother John played for Shamrock Rovers and Drumcondra and his eldest brother Christy played for Transport.

He made his first appearance for United during the 1954–55 season and quickly became a regular first-team player, and went on to make 98 first-team appearances in four seasons at United, scoring 52 goals. He was United's top scorer in the 1956–57 season, scoring 26 goals in the First Division and 33 in all competitions as United won their second successive league title and reached the semi-finals of the European Cup. He also gave a commanding display in the 1957 FA Cup final despite losing 2–1 to Aston Villa. Such was the strength of the competition in the United first team that he was soon being kept out of the side by Bobby Charlton. He travelled with the United team to Belgrade for the fateful European Cup tie against Red Star Belgrade, the day before the Munich air disaster, but did not play in the game.

== Legacy ==
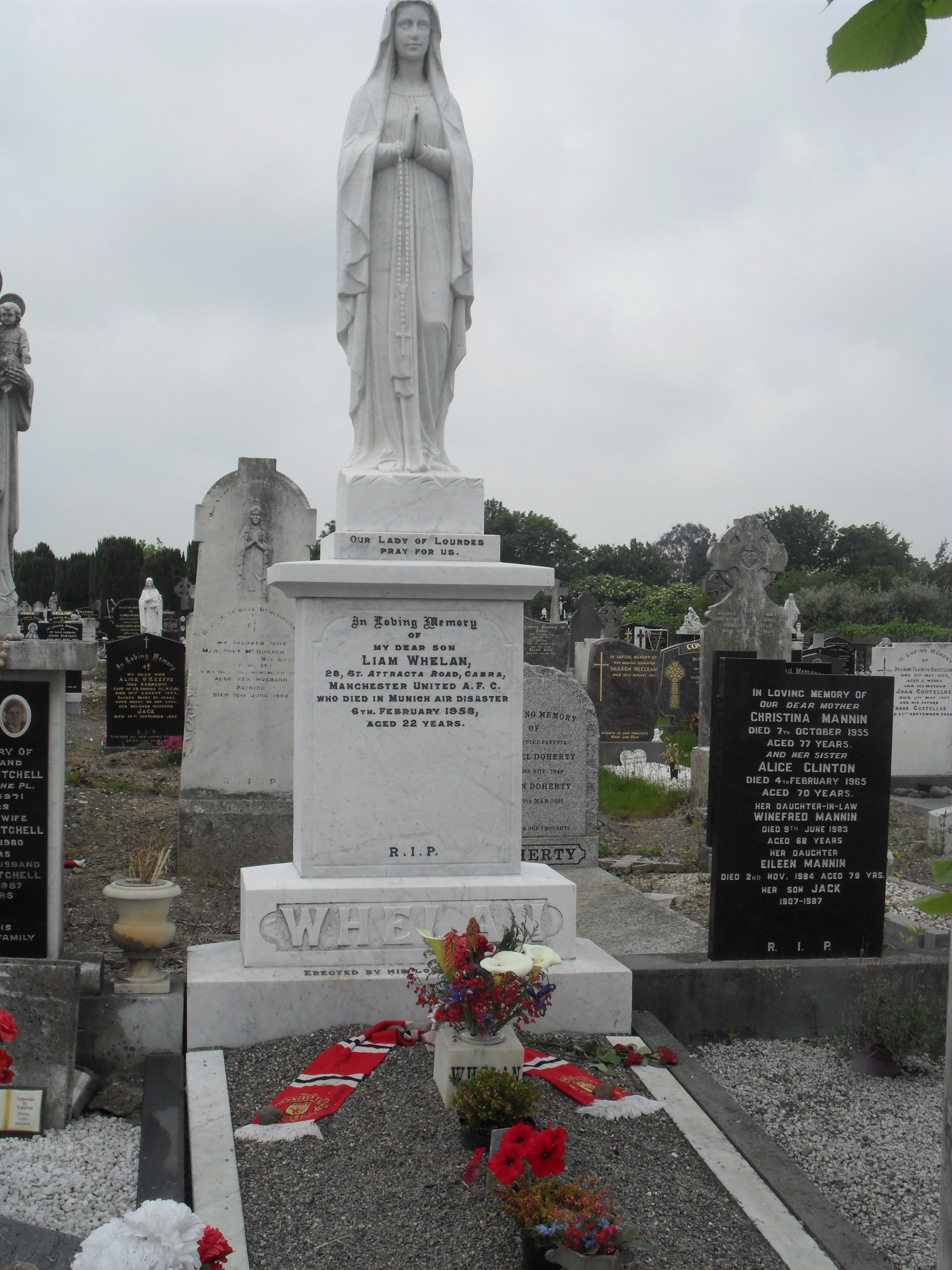
Whelan's grave in Glasnevin Cemetery, decorated with a Manchester United scarf

On 8 December 2006, the railway bridge on Fassaugh Road/Dowth Avenue junction in Cabra, Dublin 7, close to Dalymount Park was renamed in his honour. The campaign to have the bridge renamed was initiated and organised by members of the Cabra GAA club, Naomh Fionbarra and sanctioned by Dublin City Council in early 2006. It is close to St Attracta Road, the street in which he was born. The unveiling ceremony was performed by Whelan's Manchester United teammate at the time of the air crash, Bobby Charlton.

On 4 February 2008, the Irish national postal body An Post issued a 55c postage stamp for the 50th anniversary of the Munich air disaster showing a photo of Liam Whelan.

Whelan is buried in Glasnevin Cemetery.

== Honours ==
Manchester United

- Football League First Division: 1955–56, 1956–57
- FA Charity Shield: 1956, 1957
- FA Cup runner-up: 1956–57

== See also ==
- List of people on the postage stamps of Ireland
