= Jackie Hinchliffe =

Scottish footballer

Personal information
- Full name: John Hinchliffe
- Date of birth: 4 June 1938 (age 88)
- Place of birth: Tillicoultry, Scotland
- Position: Right half

Youth career
- L. Pieter's Boys Club
- 1954–1956: Aston Villa

Senior career*
Years	Team	Apps	(Gls)
1956–1958	Aston Villa	2	(0)
1958–1961	Workington	116	(4)
1961–1964	Hartlepools United	88	(8)
1964–1965	Weymouth		(2)
- Netherfield
- Durham City
- * Club domestic league appearances and goals

John Hinchliffe (born 4 June 1938) is a Scottish former professional footballer who made 206 appearances in the English Football League playing as a right half for Aston Villa, Workington and Hartlepools United. He also played non-league football for Weymouth, where he played 54 matches in all competitions and scored twice as his team won the 1964–65 Southern Football League title, Netherfield and Durham City. He represented Scotland at schoolboy level.

Hinchliffe was born in 1938 in Tillicoultry, Clackmannanshire.
