= 2007 FA Cup final =

English football match

- Event: 2006–07 FA Cup
Chelsea	Manchester United
1	0
- After extra time
- Date: 19 May 2007
- Venue: Wembley Stadium, London
- Man of the Match: Frank Lampard (Chelsea)
- Referee: Steve Bennett (Kent)
- Attendance: 89,826

The 2007 FA Cup final was played on Saturday, 19 May 2007 between Chelsea and Manchester United. It was the 126th FA Cup final and the first to be played at the new Wembley Stadium. Chelsea beat Manchester United 1-0 thanks to an extra-time goal from Didier Drogba, completing a domestic cup double for the Blues in the 2006–07 season, as they had already won the League Cup Final in February. Manchester United were favourite for winning a double of their own as they had recently beaten Chelsea to the Premier League title two weeks earlier. The game was widely considered to be a disappointment by pundits and fans alike. As a result of Manchester United and Chelsea having already been guaranteed qualification for the UEFA Champions League, the UEFA Cup entry for the FA Cup winner/runner-up went instead to the highest positioned Premier League team who had not already qualified for Europe: Bolton Wanderers.

The match had an attendance of 89,826, the largest for an FA Cup Final since Wimbledon's famous 1–0 win over Liverpool in the 1988 final, when 98,203 attended. Chelsea became only the third club to complete the domestic cup double – Arsenal did it in 1993 and Liverpool in 2001. It was their fourth FA Cup triumph, and their first under the management of José Mourinho. They had won the last FA Cup final at the old Wembley Stadium seven years earlier. This was also the last FA Cup Final for Alex Ferguson as Manchester United manager and as a manager overall.

== Background ==
=== History ===
The match was the first time since 1986 that the FA Cup final had been contested between the winners and runners-up of the English league, and the first time ever that the Premier League champions and the League Cup winners from the same season had gone head to head in the final. Manchester United were aiming for their 12th FA Cup to extend their overall record as the most successful team in the competition's history, while Chelsea were playing for their fourth FA Cup overall. The last time Chelsea had played Manchester United in an FA Cup Final was in 1994, when Manchester United ran out 4–0 winners after a goalless first half. Ryan Giggs was the only player in the 2007 FA Cup Final who played back in 1994. Chelsea's assistant coach Steve Clarke played on that day for the Blues in 1994.

Ryan Giggs was playing in his seventh FA Cup Final, equalling Roy Keane's post-war record, having played in the 1994, 1995, 1996, 1999, 2004 and 2005 finals. Chelsea were also the last club to win the FA Cup at the old Wembley Stadium, when they beat Aston Villa in the 2000 Final.

Chelsea continued the dominance of the so-called "Big Four", who had now won the last 12 finals in a row (Arsenal 4 wins, Manchester United 3, Chelsea 3, Liverpool 2), since Everton's 1995 victory over Manchester United. It was the eighth FA Cup Final in a row (Arsenal 4 appearances, Chelsea 2, Millwall 1, West Ham 1) involving a London club; the last Final not to involve a London club was Manchester United's 2–0 win over Newcastle United in the 1999 final.

Before the match, there was an official opening ceremony of the new stadium. This included the official opening by Prince William, a fly-past by The Red Arrows and a parade on the pitch of former winners at the old Wembley Stadium.

The full list was:

- Peter McParland – Aston Villa goalscorer, 1957
- Roy Hartle – Bolton Wanderers right-back, 1958
- Charlie Thomson – Nottingham Forest goalkeeper, 1959
- Bill Slater – Wolverhampton Wanderers captain, 1960
- Bobby Smith – Tottenham Hotspur goalscorer, 1961
- Cliff Jones – Tottenham Hotspur winger, 1962
- Denis Law – Manchester United goalscorer, 1963
- Geoff Hurst – West Ham United goalscorer, 1964
- Ian St John – Liverpool goalscorer, 1965
- Derek Temple – Everton goalscorer, 1966
- Dave Mackay – Tottenham Hotspur captain, 1967
- Graham Williams – West Bromwich Albion captain, 1968
- Mike Summerbee – Manchester City winger, 1969
- Ron Harris – Chelsea captain, 1970
- Frank McLintock – Arsenal captain, 1971
- Peter Lorimer – Leeds United winger, 1972
- Jim Montgomery – Sunderland goalkeeper, 1973
- Ray Clemence – Liverpool goalkeeper, 1974
- Alan Taylor – West Ham United goalscorer, 1975
- Lawrie McMenemy – Southampton manager, 1976
- Lou Macari – Manchester United forward, 1977
- Kevin Beattie – Ipswich Town defender, 1978
- Frank Stapleton – Arsenal goalscorer, 1979
- Trevor Brooking – West Ham United goalscorer, 1980
- Ricardo Villa and Steve Perryman – Tottenham Hotspur midfielder and captain, 1981
- Glenn Hoddle – Tottenham Hotspur goalscorer, 1982
- Arthur Albiston – Manchester United defender, 1983
- Trevor Steven – Everton midfielder, 1984

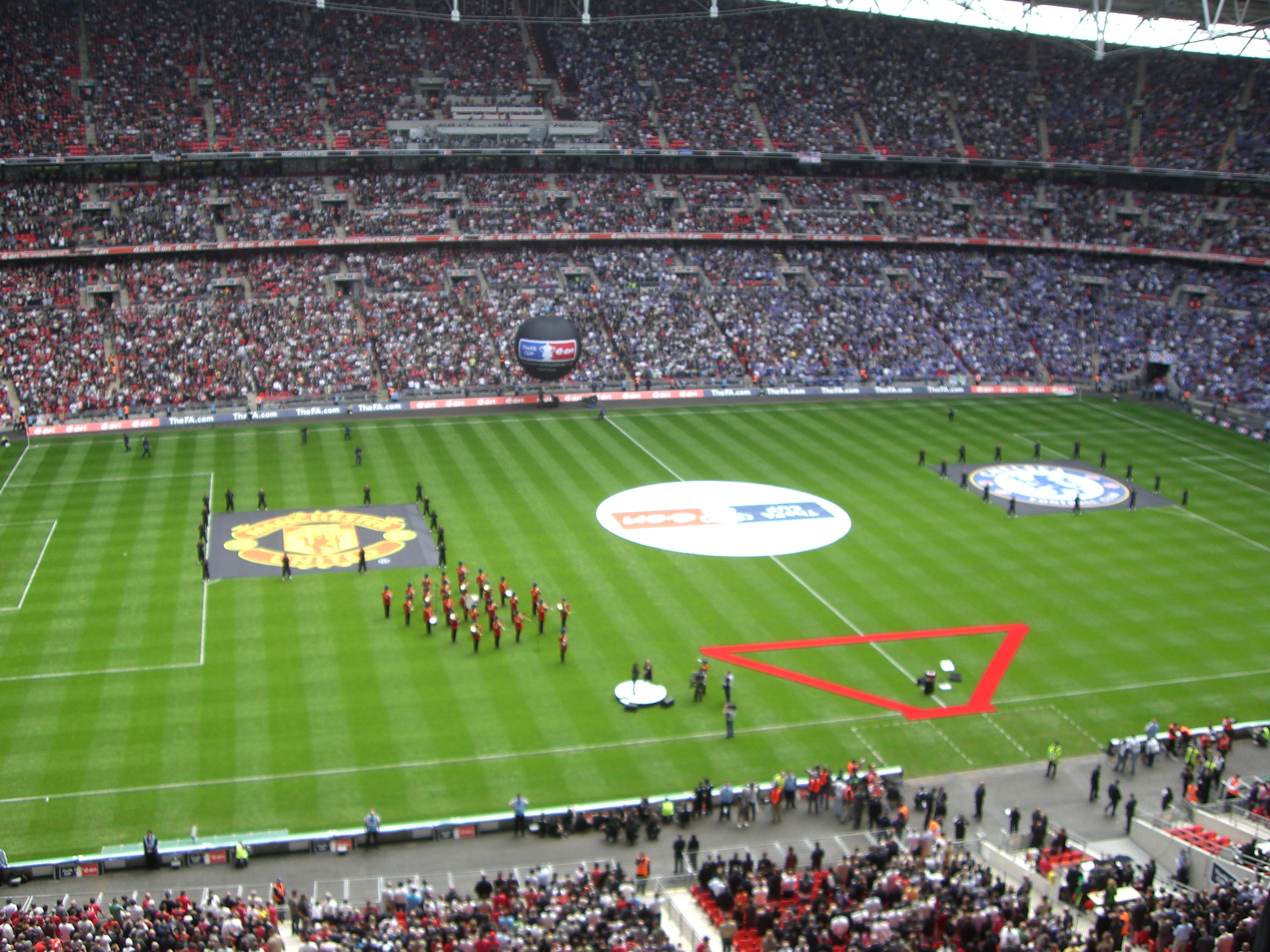
The new Wembley Stadium before the match

- Norman Whiteside – Manchester United goalscorer, 1985
- Ian Rush – Liverpool goalscorer, 1986
- Keith Houchen – Coventry City goalscorer, 1987
- Lawrie Sanchez – Wimbledon goalscorer, 1988
- John Barnes – Liverpool midfielder, 1989
- Lee Martin – Manchester United goalscorer, 1990
- Terry Venables and Gary Mabbutt – Tottenham Hotspur manager and captain, 1991
- Michael Thomas – Liverpool goalscorer, 1992
- Ian Wright – Arsenal goalscorer, 1993
- Mark Hughes – Manchester United goalscorer, 1994
- Neville Southall – Everton goalkeeper, 1995
- Gary Pallister – Manchester United defender, 1996
- Dennis Wise – Chelsea captain, 1997
- David Seaman – Arsenal goalkeeper, 1998
- Peter Schmeichel – Manchester United goalkeeper, 1999
- Marcel Desailly – Chelsea defender, 2000

=== Recent meetings ===
Both league matches between the two clubs in the 2006–07 season finished as draws. On 26 November 2006 at Manchester United's Old Trafford ground, the match ended in a 1–1 stalemate, with the goals coming from Louis Saha and Ricardo Carvalho. The two clubs met again on 9 May 2007 in their penultimate league fixture at Stamford Bridge, but, with the league already having been sewn up the weekend before, both teams rested most of their major players and the match ended 0–0.

== Road to Wembley ==
Chelsea		Round	Manchester United	
Macclesfield Town [L2] H 6–1	Lampard 16', 41', 51' (pen.); Wright-Phillips 68'; Mikel 82'; Carvalho 86'	Third Round	Aston Villa [P] H 2–1	Larsson 55'; Solskjær 90'
Nottingham Forest [L1] H 3–0	Shevchenko 9'; Drogba 18'; Mikel 45'	Fourth Round	Portsmouth [P] H 2–1	Rooney 77', 83'
Norwich City [C] H 4–0	Wright-Phillips 39'; Drogba 51'; Essien 90'; Shevchenko 90'	Fifth Round	Reading [P] H 1–1	Carrick 45'
Norwich City [C] H 4–0	Wright-Phillips 39'; Drogba 51'; Essien 90'; Shevchenko 90'	Replay	Reading [P] A 3–2	Heinze 2'; Saha 4'; Solskjær 6'
Tottenham Hotspur [P] H 3–3	Lampard 22', 71'; Kalou 86'	Sixth Round	Middlesbrough [P] A 2–2	Rooney 23'; Ronaldo 68' (pen.)
Tottenham Hotspur [P] A 2–1	Shevchenko 55'; Wright-Phillips 61'	Replays	Middlesbrough [P] H 1–0	Ronaldo 76' (pen.)
Blackburn Rovers [P] Old Trafford, Manchester; 2–1 (a.e.t.)	Lampard 16'; Ballack 109'	Semi-finals	Watford [P] Villa Park, Birmingham; 4–1	Rooney 7', 66'; Ronaldo 28'; Richardson 82'

- Both clubs received a bye to the Third Round.
- In square brackets is a letter that represents the opposition's division
  - [P] = Premier League
  - [C] = Championship
  - [L1] = Football League One
  - [L2] = Football League Two

== Match ==
=== Summary ===
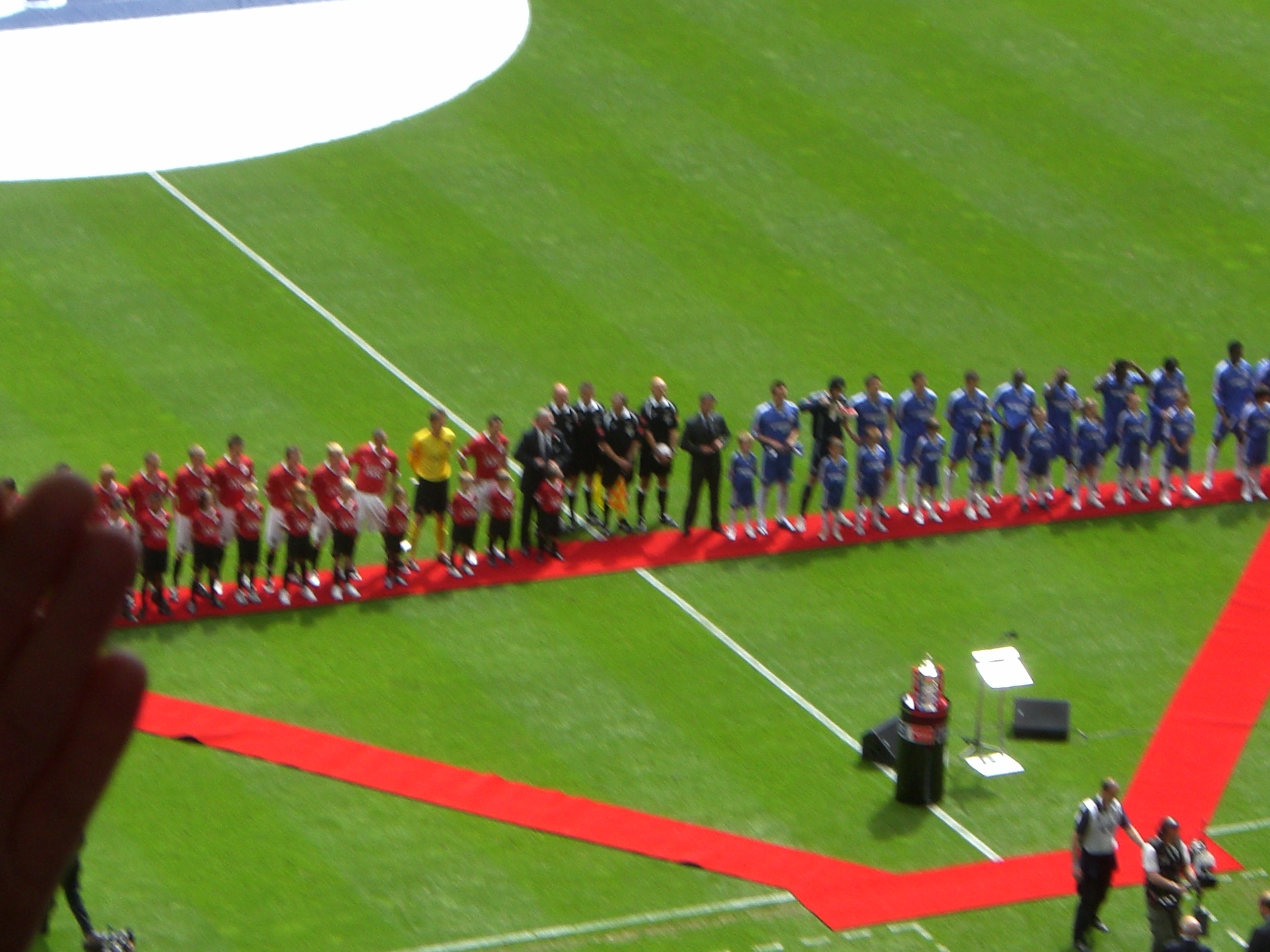
The two teams line up prior to kick-off.

The opening twenty minutes of the game were marked by cautious play and a lack of creativity from both teams, until Didier Drogba produced the game's first noticeable attempt on goal by hammering a shot wide from thirty yards. It took a further ten minutes for another shot, this time from Chelsea's Frank Lampard who forced a save from Edwin van der Sar. Wayne Rooney was twice called offside for Manchester United in the first half, but it was the closest the Red Devils came to any kind of chance.

At half time, Chelsea manager José Mourinho made a like-for-like substitution, bringing on Dutch winger Arjen Robben for Joe Cole. A minute after the restart, Rooney produced the most exciting action to that moment, dribbling round two Chelsea defenders before aiming a powerful shot towards goal, but Petr Čech managed to make a convincing save. Rooney set off on another run ten minutes later, carrying the ball a good sixty yards towards goal only to be tackled by the last Chelsea defender, Wayne Bridge. Ryan Giggs then flashed a volley barely two feet over the bar from close range after a cross from Paul Scholes, who picked up the game's first booking a minute later after fouling Lampard. From the resulting free kick, Drogba curled the ball around the Manchester United wall and off the outside of the near post. Rooney set off on another dangerous run soon after, dribbling round both John Terry and Michael Essien before having the ball taken off his feet by Čech.

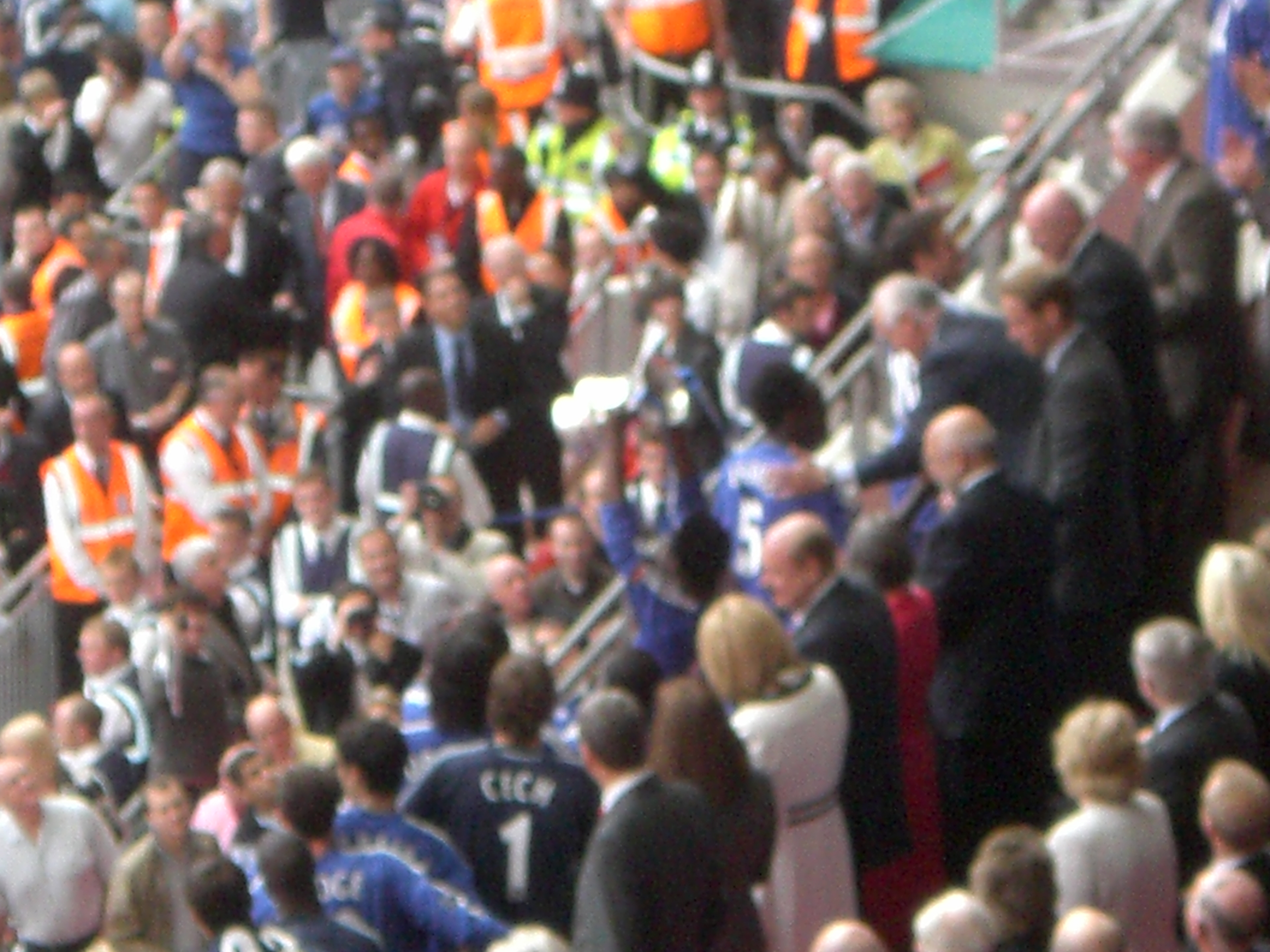
Chelsea players collect the trophy, presented by Prince William

With neither side doing enough to score in normal time, the game went into extra time for the third consecutive FA Cup Final. Manchester United's best chance of the game fell to Giggs from only three yards out after Rooney slid a pass across goal, but the Welshman could not get proper contact on his shot and Čech got down to make the save. Giggs appealed for a goal, claiming that the ball had crossed the line in Čech's arms, but the linesman did not flag and referee Steve Bennett waved play on. Television replays appeared to show that the ball had just crossed the line, but only after Giggs's momentum had pushed Čech backwards into his own goal. After the game, Manchester United manager Alex Ferguson claimed that Giggs had been fouled by Essien just before he took his shot.

The deadlock was finally broken after 116 minutes when Drogba played a one-two with Lampard on the edge of the box after receiving the ball from Mikel John Obi, and prodded the ball past the onrushing van der Sar and into the net. Chelsea picked up three more bookings in the last few minutes as they tried to halt a late Manchester United comeback, but Drogba's goal proved to be the last chance of the game as Mourinho's side held on to win the first ever FA Cup Final at the new Wembley Stadium.

=== Match details ===
19 May 2007
15:00 BST

Chelsea	1–0 (a.e.t.)	Manchester United
Drogba 116'	(Report)

Wembley Stadium, London
Attendance: 89,826
Referee: Steve Bennett (Kent)

Chelsea	Manchester United

GK	1	(Czech Republic) Petr Čech
RB	20	(Portugal) Paulo Ferreira	(yellow card) 120'
CB	5	(Ghana) Michael Essien
CB	26	(England) John Terry (c)
LB	18	(England) Wayne Bridge
DM	4	(France) Claude Makélélé	(yellow card) 83'
CM	12	(Nigeria) Mikel John Obi
CM	8	(England) Frank Lampard
RW	24	(England) Shaun Wright-Phillips		(substituted off) 93'
LW	10	(England) Joe Cole		(substituted off) 45'
CF	11	(Ivory Coast) Didier Drogba
Substitutes:
GK	23	(Italy) Carlo Cudicini
DF	3	(England) Ashley Cole	(yellow card) 120'		(substituted on) 108'
MF	16	(Netherlands) Arjen Robben		(substituted on) 45'	(substituted off) 108'
MF	19	(France) Lassana Diarra
FW	21	(Ivory Coast) Salomon Kalou	(yellow card) 119'	(substituted on) 93'
Manager:
(Portugal) José Mourinho

GK	1	(Netherlands) Edwin van der Sar
RB	6	(England) Wes Brown
CB	5	(England) Rio Ferdinand
CB	15	(Serbia) Nemanja Vidić	(yellow card) 84'
LB	4	(Argentina) Gabriel Heinze
RM	24	(Scotland) Darren Fletcher		(substituted off) 92'
CM	18	(England) Paul Scholes	(yellow card) 58'
CM	16	(England) Michael Carrick		(substituted off) 112'
LM	7	(Portugal) Cristiano Ronaldo
SS	11	(Wales) Ryan Giggs (c)		(substituted off) 112'
CF	8	(England) Wayne Rooney
Substitutes:
GK	29	(Poland) Tomasz Kuszczak
DF	3	(France) Patrice Evra
DF	22	(Republic of Ireland) John O'Shea		(substituted on) 112'
MF	14	(England) Alan Smith	(yellow card) 105'	(substituted on) 92'
FW	20	(Norway) Ole Gunnar Solskjær		(substituted on) 112'
Manager:
(Scotland) Alex Ferguson

Match officials

- Assistant referees:
  - Peter Kirkup (Northamptonshire)
  - Dave Bryan (Lincolnshire)
- Fourth official: Howard Webb (Sheffield & Hallamshire)

Match rules

- 90 minutes
- 30 minutes of extra-time if necessary
- Penalty shoot-out if scores still level
- Five named substitutes
- Maximum of three substitutions

=== Statistics ===
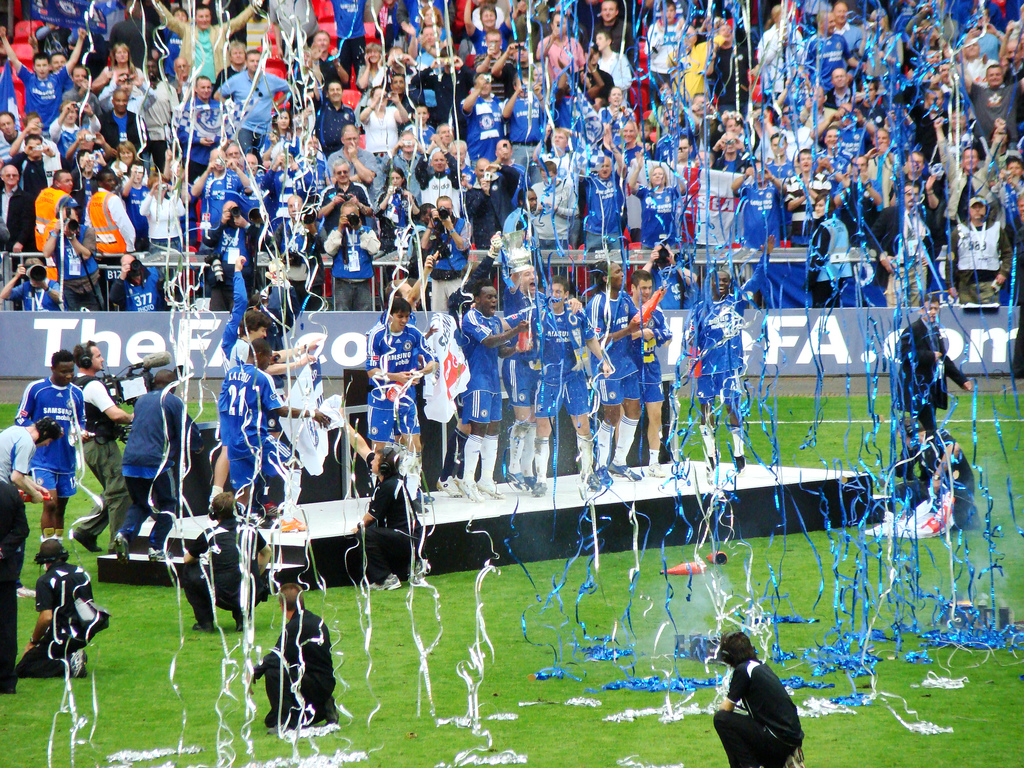
The Chelsea players celebrate

	Chelsea	Manchester United
Total shots	18	12
Shots on target	4	4
Ball possession	50%	50%
Corner kicks	1	6
Fouls committed	18	18
Offsides	0	5
Yellow cards	4	3
Red cards	0	0

Source: ESPN

== See also ==
- 2007 League Cup Final
- 2006–07 FA Cup
- 2006–07 League Cup
