= Bill Beaton =

Scottish footballer (born 1935)

Personal information
- Full name: William Beaton
- Date of birth: 30 September 1935 (age 91)
- Place of birth: Kincardine, Scotland
- Position: Goalkeeper

Youth career
- Thornton Hibs

Senior career*
Years	Team	Apps	(Gls)
1956–1958	Dunfermline Athletic	36	(0)
1958–1959	Aston Villa	1	(0)
1959–1962	Airdrieonians	17	(0)
1962–1963	Alloa Athletic		
- Sauchie
Total		54	(0)
- * Club domestic league appearances and goals

William Beaton (born 30 September 1935) is a Scottish former footballer who played in the Football League for Aston Villa. Beaton played one match for Villa in which he conceded six goals in a 6–3 defeat against Leicester City.
