= Dennis Jackson =

English footballer

Personal information
- Full name: Dennis Ray Jackson
- Date of birth: 8 March 1932
- Place of birth: Birmingham, England
- Date of death: 20 March 2014 (aged 82)
- Position: Defender

Senior career*
Years	Team	Apps	(Gls)
- West Bromwich Albion
	Hednesford Town FC		(0)
1953-1959	Aston Villa	8	(0)
1959-1961	Millwall FC	80	(0)
	Rugby Town FC	0	(0)
Total		88	(0)
- * Club domestic league appearances and goals

Dennis Ray Jackson (8 March 1932 – 20 March 2014) was an English professional footballer who played as a full back.

== Career ==
Born in Birmingham, Jackson played for West Bromwich Albion, and Hednesford Town before joining Aston Villa.

He worked under legendry coach Jimmy Hogan and made 8 first-team appearances while playing over 100 reserve-team games. He was a teammate of Ron Atkinson. He made his Aston Villa debut on 10 Apr 1957, in the Second City Derby. Villa beat Birmingham 2–1 at St Andrew's.

Jackson subsequently played for Millwall and Rugby Town.

== Later life and death ==
Jackson died in March 2014 at the age of 82.
