= Les Jones (footballer, born 1930) =

Welsh footballer

Personal information
- Full name: Leslie Clifford Jones
- Date of birth: 1 January 1930
- Place of birth: Mountain Ash, Wales
- Date of death: 6 January 2016 (aged 86)
- Place of death: Birmingham, England
- Position: Full back

Senior career*
Years	Team	Apps	(Gls)
1950–1957	Luton Town	98	(1)
1957–1958	Aston Villa	5	(0)
1959–19??	Worcester City		
Total		103	(1)
- * Club domestic league appearances and goals

Leslie Clifford Jones (1 January 1930 – 6 January 2016) was a Welsh footballer who played as a full back for Luton Town and Aston Villa in the 1950s.

== Luton Town ==
Jones' first game was at Kenilworth Road on 28 April 1951, the penultimate game of the 1950–51 season. He made three more appearances the following season but established himself in the team during the 1952–53 season, which included playing in every FA Cup game before being knocked out by Bolton Wanderers who would finish runners-up. In January the same season he scored the only goal of his career in a 2–0 home win over Fulham. His last appearance for the Hatters was in December 1957 at Portsmouth.

== Aston Villa ==
Jones made his Aston Villa debut, after moving from Luton Town in January, on 1 February 1958. He only made four more appearances for Villa, all in that 1957–58 season.

== Worcester City ==
Jones moved to Worcester City in July 1959.

== Playing career ==
Club performance			League		FA Cup		SPFC		Total	
Season	Club	Division	Apps	Goals	Apps	Goals	Apps	Goals	Apps	Goals
1950–51	Luton Town	Second Division	2	0	0	0	0	0	2	0
1951–52	Luton Town	Second Division	3	0	0	0	0	0	3	0
1952–53	Luton Town	Second Division	16	1	4	0	0	0	20	1
1953–54	Luton Town	Second Division	22	0	3	0	0	0	25	0
1954–55	Luton Town	Second Division	1	0	0	0	0	0	1	0
1955–56	Luton Town	First Division	15	0	0	0	0	0	15	0
1956–57	Luton Town	First Division	20	0	0	0	4	0	24	0
1957–58	Luton Town	First Division	19	0	0	0	1	0	20	0
Luton total			98	1	7	0	5	0	110	1
1957–58	Aston Villa	First Division	5	0	?	?	?	?	?	?
Aston Villa total			5	0	?	?	?	?	?	?
Career total			103	1	?	?	?	?	?	?
