= Trevor Birch (footballer, born 1933) =

English footballer

Personal information
- Full name: Trevor Birch
- Date of birth: 20 November 1933
- Place of birth: West Bromwich, England
- Date of death: May 2013 (aged 79)
- Place of death: Staffordshire, England
- Position: Wing half

Senior career*
Years	Team	Apps	(Gls)
- Accles & Pollock
1954–1960	Aston Villa	22	(0)
1960–1962	Stockport County	43	(0)
- Nuneaton Borough
Total		65	(0)
- * Club domestic league appearances and goals

Trevor Birch (20 November 1933 – May 2013) was an English footballer who played as a wing half in the Football League for Aston Villa and Stockport County.
