= Stan Crowther (footballer) =

English footballer

Personal information
- Date of birth: 3 September 1935
- Place of birth: Bilston, Staffordshire, England
- Date of death: 28 May 2014 (aged 78)
- Position: Wing half

Senior career*
Years	Team	Apps	(Gls)
????–1955	Bilston Town		
1955–1958	Aston Villa	50	(4)
1958	Manchester United	13	(0)
1958–1961	Chelsea	51	(0)
1961	Brighton & Hove Albion	4	(0)
- Hednesford Town
- Rugby Town

International career
1957–1958	England U23	3	(0)
- * Club domestic league appearances and goals

Stanley Crowther (3 September 1935 – 28 May 2014) was an English footballer who played in the Football League for Aston Villa, Manchester United, Chelsea and Brighton & Hove Albion during the 1950s and early 1960s. He won three caps for the England under-23 team, though he was never selected at senior level.

== Life and career ==
Crowther was born in Bilston, Staffordshire. A wing half, he signed for Aston Villa from non-league club Bilston Town for a fee of £750 in 1955. He was part of the Villa team that beat Manchester United 2–1 to win the 1957 FA Cup final. Less than a year later, in February 1958, Crowther was hastily signed by United for £18,000 in the wake of the Munich air disaster. The transfer was completed around an hour before their match against Sheffield Wednesday in the FA Cup was due to kick off.

Having already played for Villa in the competition that year, Crowther would normally have been cup-tied, but United's squad had been ravaged by Munich and were therefore given special dispensation by the Football Association to field him. United won the match 3–0, and Crowther and United went on to reach a second consecutive final, though they lost 2–0 to Bolton Wanderers.

His time at Old Trafford was short-lived, however, and in December that year he joined Chelsea for £10,000; coincidentally, his debut for the Pensioners was against United. Crowther stayed with the west London side for two seasons, making 58 appearances in all competitions, before having brief spells with Brighton & Hove Albion, where his contract was terminated apparently because of the player's refusal to appear for the club's third team, and non-league sides Hednesford Town and Rugby Town. Crowther announced his retirement at the age of 27, citing his disillusionment with the game.

In his later life, he was diagnosed with osteoporosis which gradually worsened. In a 2012 interview, he called winning the FA Cup with Villa "the best day of his life". He died on 28 May 2014.

== Honours ==
Aston Villa

- FA Cup: 1956–57

Manchester United

- FA Cup runner-up: 1957–58
