= Bill Myerscough =

English footballer

Personal information
- Full name: William Henry Myerscough
- Date of birth: 22 June 1930
- Place of birth: Bolton, Lancashire, England
- Date of death: 16 March 1977 (aged 46)
- Place of death: Glossop, Derbyshire, England
- Height: 5 ft 9 in (1.75 m)
- Position: Inside forward

Senior career*
Years	Team	Apps	(Gls)
19??–1954	Ashfield		
1954–1955	Walsall	26	(6)
1955–1959	Aston Villa	64	(15)
1959–1960	Rotherham United	38	(11)
1960–1962	Coventry City	58	(16)
1962–1963	Chester	36	(10)
1963–1964	Wrexham	35	(5)
1964–1967	Macclesfield Town	71	(48)
Total		328	(111)
- * Club domestic league appearances and goals

Bill Myerscough (22 June 1930 – 16 March 1977) was an English professional footballer who played in the Football League for six clubs. He was in the Aston Villa side that won the 1957 FA Cup Final.

== Playing career ==
An inside forward, Myerscough began his professional career at the relatively late age of 24 when he joined Walsall from Ashfield in time for the 1954–55 season. He spent a season with the Saddlers before joining Football League First Division side Aston Villa, where he went on to make 64 league appearances over the next four years.

The highlight though came in the 1957 FA Cup Final, when Villa denied Manchester United a First Division and FA Cup double with a 2–1 victory. Unfortunately the following season ended in relegation and Myerscough spent a season with Rotherham United before joining Coventry City in July 1960.

In March 1962, Myerscough joined Chester, who were destined to finish bottom of the Fourth Division. Myerscough made his debut alongside fellow new signing Ron Hewitt in a 5–1 defeat at York City on 3 March 1962 and ended the season with three goals from 13 games. He featured in half the league games the following season and then moved to Wrexham in exchange for Stan Bennion and George Evans. After a season with Wrexham, Myerscough ended his professional career and joined non-league side Macclesfield Town. He died in 1977.

== Honours ==
Aston Villa

- FA Cup: 1956–57
