= Wally Hazelden =

English footballer (1941–2019)

Personal information
- Full name: Walter Hazelden
- Date of birth: 13 February 1941
- Place of birth: Ashton-in-Makerfield, England
- Date of death: 2019 (aged 77–78)
- Position: Forward

Youth career
- 1956–1957: Aston Villa

Senior career*
Years	Team	Apps	(Gls)
1957–1960	Aston Villa	17	(5)
1960–1961	Wigan Athletic	26	(23)
- * Club domestic league appearances and goals

Walter Hazelden (13 February 1941 – 2019) was an English footballer who played as an inside forward for Aston Villa and Wigan Athletic.

== Career ==
Hazelden was born on 13 February 1941 in Ashton-in-Makerfield, Wigan. He started his career with Aston Villa after being signed as a junior player in 1956. At the age of 16, he made his first team debut for the club in November 1957 against West Bromwich Albion, scoring the opening goal and setting up Villa's second in a 3–2 defeat. On 1 February 1958, before a match against Blackpool, Hazelden presented a gift on behalf of Aston Villa to Stanley Matthews to commemorate his 43rd birthday. A few days later, he represented the England national youth team, scoring in a 2–2 draw against Yugoslavia. He scored five goals in 17 Football League games for Villa before joining Wigan Athletic in July 1960.

Hazelden played at Wigan for one season, making 26 appearances in the Lancashire Combination, and finishing as the club's top scorer with 23 goals.

He then joined Southern League side Rugby Town where he played for 3 seasons making 112 appearances in all competitions and scoring 56 goals
