= Jackie Sewell =

English footballer (1927-2016)

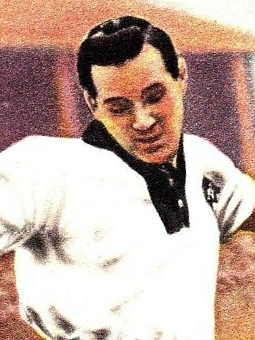
- Jackie Sewell in 1951

Personal information
- Date of birth: 24 January 1927
- Place of birth: Kells, Whitehaven, Cumberland, England
- Date of death: 26 September 2016 (aged 89)
- Position: Forward

Youth career
- Whitehaven Town

Senior career*
Years	Team	Apps	(Gls)
1946–1951	Notts County	178	(97)
1951–1955	Sheffield Wednesday	164	(87)
1955–1959	Aston Villa	123	(36)
1959–1961	Hull City	44	(8)
1961–1965	City of Lusaka		
Total		509	(228)

International career
1951–1954	England	6	(3)
1964–1965	Zambia	10	(7)
- * Club domestic league appearances and goals

John "Jackie" Sewell (24 January 1927 – 26 September 2016) was an England International footballer. He played as a forward for several teams including Sheffield Wednesday, Notts County and Aston Villa. When he was transferred to Sheffield Wednesday from Notts County, for £34,500, he was the most expensive signing in English football. When Sewell captained the newly independent nation of Zambia in October 1964, he became one of the few footballers who have played for two different countries. He was the last living footballer who played in the Match of the Century on 25 November 1953.

== Career ==
=== Notts County ===
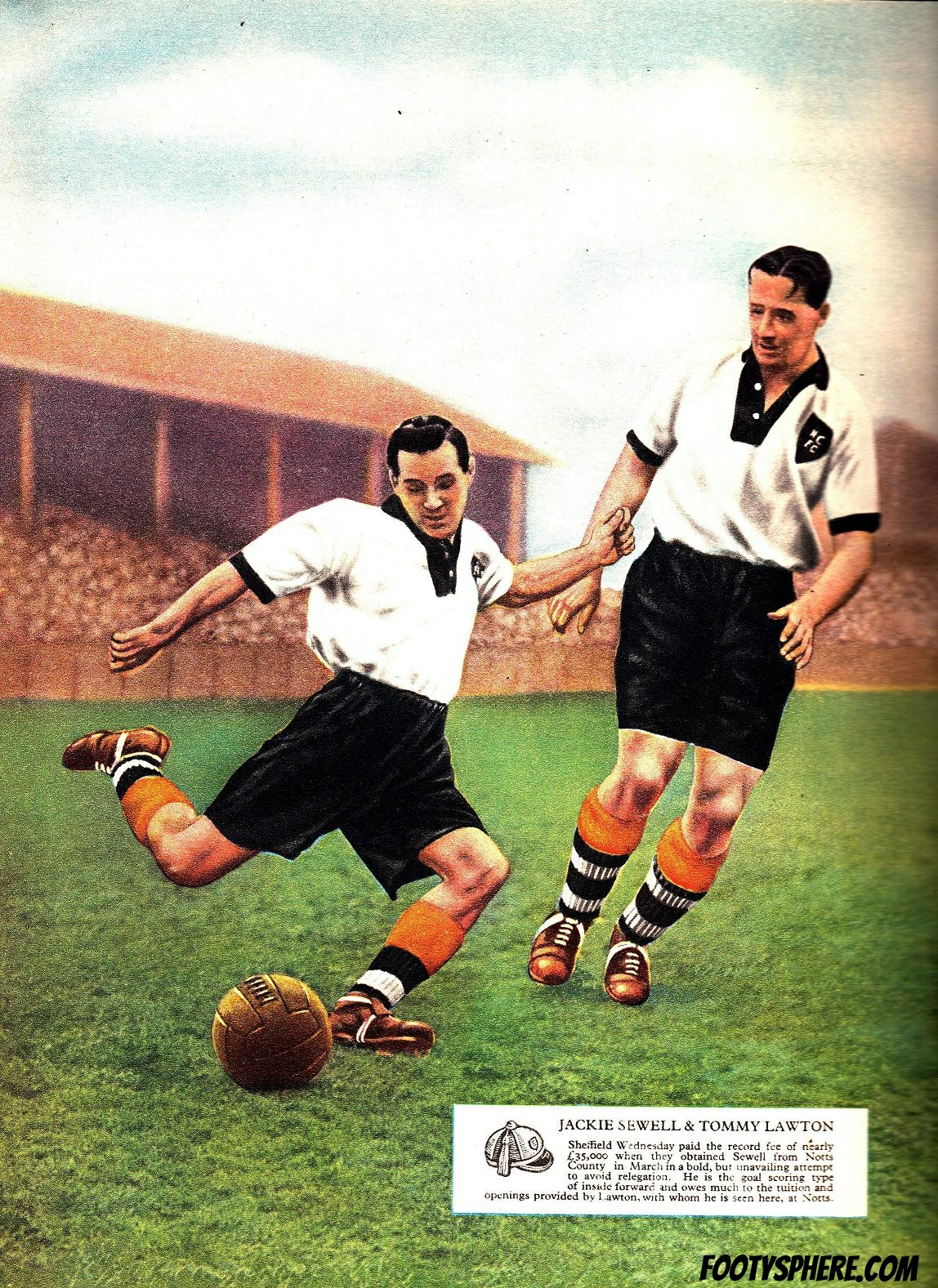
Jackie Sewell and Tommy Lawton

Jackie Sewell was born in Kells, Whitehaven, Cumberland, and began his career at miners club Kells Centre. Sewell was spotted by Notts County in a Cumberland League match against Workington, leading to a trial. Sewell then began his professional footballing career at Notts County, for whom he was a prolific goalscorer. He was an important member of the team which won the Football League Third Division South for the 1949–50 season. He scored 97 goals in 178 league appearances for the club.

=== Sheffield Wednesday ===
He signed for Sheffield Wednesday in March 1951, playing 175 games and scoring 92 goals in his four years at Hillsborough. He joined Aston Villa in December 1955. During his time at Hillsborough he earned 6 England caps, scoring 3 goals.

=== Aston Villa ===
He joined Aston Villa in December 1955 for £20,000, and he played 145 matches for them until October 1959. He was then sold to Hull City. He was part of the FA Cup winning team of 1957.

=== Hull City and coaching ===
He moved from Aston Villa to Hull City before retiring as a player in 1961. He then moved to Northern Rhodesia and became player-coach for City of Lusaka. He later coached teams in Rhodesia (Zimbabwe) and the Belgian Congo (now known as the Democratic Republic of Congo).

== International career ==
Jackie Sewell gained six caps for England, scoring three goals, one in England's historic defeat against Hungary in 1953. He also captained the Zambia national team when the country gained its independence from Britain in 1964. He made 10 appearances for Zambia between 1964 and 1965, scoring seven goals.

== Honours ==
Aston Villa

- FA Cup: 1956–57

== Bibliography ==
- Hayes, Dean (1997). The Villa Park Encyclopedia: A-Z of Aston Villa. Mainstream Publishing (2 October 1997). p. 145. ISBN 978-1-85158-959-3.
