= 1956–57 FA Cup =

Tournament details
- Country: England; Wales

Final positions
- Champions: Aston Villa (7th title)
- Runners-up: Manchester United

The 1956–57 FA Cup was the 76th staging of the world's oldest football cup competition, the Football Association Challenge Cup, commonly known as the FA Cup. Aston Villa won the competition, beating Manchester United 2–1 in the final at Wembley, London.

Matches were played at the stadium of the team named first on the date specified for each round, which was always a Saturday. If scores were level after 90 minutes had been played, a replay would take place at the stadium of the second-named team later the same week. If the replayed match was drawn further replays would be held at neutral venues until a winner was determined. If scores were level after 90 minutes had been played in a replay, a 30-minute period of extra time would be played.

== Calendar ==
Round	Date
Preliminary round	Saturday 8 September 1956
First qualifying round	Saturday 22 September 1956
Second qualifying round	Saturday 6 October 1956
Third qualifying round	Saturday 20 October 1956
Fourth qualifying round	Saturday 3 November 1956
First round proper	Saturday 17 November 1956
Second round	Saturday 8 December 1956
Third round	Saturday 5 January 1957
Fourth round	Saturday 26 January 1957
Fifth round	Saturday 16 February 1957
Sixth round	Saturday 2 March 1957
Semifinals	Saturday 23 March 1957
Final	Saturday 4 May 1957

== Qualifying rounds ==
Most participating clubs that were not members of the Football League competed in the qualifying rounds to secure one of 30 places available in the first round.

The winners from the fourth qualifying round were Billingham Synthonia, South Shields, Evenwood Town, Blyth Spartans, Scarborough, Morecambe, Wigan Athletic, New Brighton, Rhyl, Bromsgrove Rovers, Hereford United, Boston United, Selby Town, Goole Town, Ilkeston Town, Burton Albion, Peterborough United, Dunstable Town, Ely City, Walthamstow Avenue, Margate, Guildford City, Yiewsley, Tooting & Mitcham United, Hastings United, Newport (IOW), Dorchester Town, Weymouth, Yeovil Town and Cheltenham Town.

Those appearing in the competition proper for the first time were Evenwood Town, Dunstable Town, Ely City and Yiewsley. Of the others, South Shields had last featured at this stage in 1947-48 and Morecambe had last done so in 1936-37.

New Brighton, who had been in the Football League from 1923 until 1951, became the first club since Chelmsford City in 1938-39 to feature in nine rounds of an FA Cup tournament. They progressed from the preliminary round to the fourth round proper, defeating Prescot Cables, Marine, Earlestown, South Liverpool, Hyde United, Stockport County, Derby County and Torquay United before going out to Burnley at Turf Moor.

== Results ==
=== First round proper ===
At this stage the 48 clubs from the Football League Third Division North and South joined the 30 non-league clubs that came through the qualifying rounds. To complete this round Bishop Auckland and Bedford Town were given byes to this round, with Bishop Auckland being the champions from the previous season's FA Amateur Cup and Bedford Town having taken Arsenal to a third-round replay in the previous season's FA Cup.

Matches were played on Saturday, 17 November 1956. Eight matches were drawn, with replays taking place later the same week.

Tie no	Home team	Score	Away team	Date	Attendance	Notes
1	Ely City	2–6	Torquay United	17 November 1956		
2	Chester	0–0	Barrow	17 November 1956		
Replay	Barrow	3–1	Chester	22 November 1956		
3	Darlington	7–2	Evenwood Town	17 November 1956		
4	Bournemouth & Boscombe Athletic	8–0	Burton Albion	17 November 1956		
5	Southampton	2–0	Northampton Town	17 November 1956		
6	Weymouth	1–0	Shrewsbury Town	17 November 1956		
7	Yeovil Town	1–3	Peterborough United	17 November 1956		
8	Walsall	0–1	Newport County	17 November 1956	12,085	
9	Crewe Alexandra	2–2	Wrexham	17 November 1956		
Replay	Wrexham	2–1	Crewe Alexandra	21 November 1956		
10	Derby County	2–1	Bradford City	17 November 1956		
11	Swindon Town	2–1	Coventry City	17 November 1956		
12	Bishop Auckland	2–1	Tranmere Rovers	17 November 1956		
13	Ipswich Town	4–0	Hastings United	17 November 1956	13,481	
14	Queens Park Rangers	4–0	Dorchester Town	17 November 1956		
15	Accrington Stanley	4–1	Morecambe	17 November 1956		
16	Brentford	3–0	Guildford City	17 November 1956		
17	Brighton & Hove Albion	1–1	Millwall	17 November 1956		
Replay	Millwall	3–1	Brighton & Hove Albion	19 November 1956		
18	Rhyl	3–2	Scarborough	17 November 1956		
19	Norwich City	2–4	Bedford Town	17 November 1956		
20	Hull City	4–0	Gateshead	17 November 1956		
21	Carlisle United	6–1	Billingham Synthonia	17 November 1956		
22	Crystal Palace	2–0	Walthamstow Avenue	17 November 1956		
23	Exeter City	0–2	Plymouth Argyle	17 November 1956		
24	Yiewsley	2–2	Gillingham	17 November 1956		
Replay	Gillingham	2–0	Yiewsley	21 November 1956		
25	Hartlepools United	3–1	Selby Town	17 November 1956		
26	Scunthorpe & Lindsey United	1–0	Rochdale	17 November 1956		
27	Mansfield Town	1–1	Workington	17 November 1956		
Replay	Workington	2–1	Mansfield Town	21 November 1956		
28	Halifax Town	2–3	Oldham Athletic	17 November 1956		
29	Margate	3–1	Dunstable Town	17 November 1956		
30	Cheltenham Town	1–2	Reading	17 November 1956		
31	Southport	0–0	York City	17 November 1956		
Replay	York City	2–1	Southport	21 November 1956		
32	New Brighton	3–3	Stockport County	17 November 1956		
Replay	Stockport County	2–3	New Brighton	21 November 1956		
33	Hereford United	3–2	Aldershot	17 November 1956		
34	Newport (IOW)	0–6	Watford	17 November 1956		
35	Tooting & Mitcham United	2–1	Bromsgrove Rovers	17 November 1956		
36	Wigan Athletic	1–2	Goole Town	17 November 1956		
37	Boston United	0–2	Bradford Park Avenue	17 November 1956		
38	South Shields	2–2	Chesterfield	17 November 1956		
Replay	Chesterfield	4–0	South Shields	21 November 1956		
39	Colchester United	1–4	Southend United	17 November 1956		
40	Ilkeston Town	1–5	Blyth Spartans	17 November 1956		

=== Second round ===
The matches were played on Saturday, 8 December 1956. Three matches were drawn, with replays taking place on the following Wednesday. Derby County went out at this stage to non-league opposition for the second consecutive season.

Tie no	Home team	Score	Away team	Date	Attendance	Notes
1	Chesterfield	4–1	Barrow	8 December 1956		
2	Southampton	3–2	Weymouth	8 December 1956		
3	Watford	1–3	Ipswich Town	8 December 1956	13,913	
4	Reading	1–0	Bedford Town	8 December 1956		
5	Gillingham	1–2	Newport County	8 December 1956	8,700	
6	Derby County	1–3	New Brighton	8 December 1956		
7	Swindon Town	0–1	Bournemouth & Boscombe Athletic	8 December 1956		
8	Accrington Stanley	2–1	Oldham Athletic	8 December 1956		
9	Brentford	1–1	Crystal Palace	8 December 1956		
Replay	Crystal Palace	3–2	Brentford	12 December 1956		
10	Rhyl	3–1	Bishop Auckland	8 December 1956		
11	Millwall	4–0	Margate	8 December 1956		
12	Hull City	2–1	York City	8 December 1956		
13	Carlisle United	2–1	Darlington	8 December 1956		
14	Goole Town	2–2	Workington	8 December 1956		
Replay	Workington	0–1	Goole Town	12 December 1956		
15	Scunthorpe & Lindsey United	0–0	Wrexham	8 December 1956		
Replay	Wrexham	6–2	Scunthorpe & Lindsey United	12 December 1956		
16	Blyth Spartans	0–1	Hartlepools United	8 December 1956		
17	Torquay United	1–0	Plymouth Argyle	8 December 1956		
18	Hereford United	2–3	Southend United	8 December 1956		
19	Tooting & Mitcham United	0–2	Queens Park Rangers	8 December 1956		
20	Peterborough United	3–0	Bradford Park Avenue	8 December 1956		

=== Third round ===
The 44 First and Second Division clubs entered the competition at this stage and the matches were played on Saturday, 5 January 1957. Eleven matches were drawn, with replays taking place later the same week, and two ties required second replays, which were both played on Monday, 14 January 1957.

Tie no	Home team	Score	Away team	Date	Attendance	Notes
1	Bournemouth & Boscombe Athletic	2–0	Accrington Stanley	5 January 1957		
2	Bristol City	4–1	Rotherham United	5 January 1957		
3	Burnley	7–0	Chesterfield	5 January 1957		
4	Bury	1–3	Portsmouth	5 January 1957		
5	Preston North End	0–0	Sheffield Wednesday	5 January 1957		
Replay	Sheffield Wednesday	2–2	Preston North End	9 January 1957		
2nd replay	Preston North End	5–1	Sheffield Wednesday	14 January 1957		^{[A]}
6	Notts County	1–3	Rhyl	5 January 1957		
7	Nottingham Forest	6–0	Goole Town	5 January 1957		
8	Bolton Wanderers	2–3	Blackpool	5 January 1957		
9	Wolverhampton Wanderers	5–3	Swansea Town	5 January 1957		
10	Middlesbrough	1–1	Charlton Athletic	5 January 1957		
Replay	Charlton Athletic	2–3	Middlesbrough	10 January 1957		
11	Sunderland	4–0	Queens Park Rangers	5 January 1957	30,557	
12	Luton Town	2–2	Aston Villa	5 January 1957	20,094	
Replay	Aston Villa	2–0	Luton Town	7 January 1957	28,356	
13	Everton	1–0	Blackburn Rovers	5 January 1957	56,293	
14	Doncaster Rovers	1–1	West Bromwich Albion	5 January 1957		
Replay	West Bromwich Albion	2–0	Doncaster Rovers	9 January 1957		
15	Wrexham	1–1	Reading	5 January 1957		
Replay	Reading	1–2	Wrexham	9 January 1957		
16	Ipswich Town	2–3	Fulham	5 January 1957	22,199	
17	Newcastle United	1–1	Manchester City	5 January 1957	57,921	
Replay	Manchester City	4–5	Newcastle United	9 January 1957	46,990	
18	Tottenham Hotspur	2–0	Leicester City	5 January 1957	56,492	
19	Barnsley	3–3	Port Vale	5 January 1957		
Replay	Port Vale	0–1	Barnsley	7 January 1957		
20	West Ham United	5–3	Grimsby Town	5 January 1957		
21	Millwall	2–0	Crystal Palace	5 January 1957		
22	Hull City	3–4	Bristol Rovers	5 January 1957		
23	Carlisle United	3–3	Birmingham City	5 January 1957	27,445	
Replay	Birmingham City	2–0	Carlisle United	9 January 1957	56,458	
24	Southend United	2–1	Liverpool	5 January 1957		
25	Hartlepools United	3–4	Manchester United	5 January 1957		
26	Huddersfield Town	0–0	Sheffield United	5 January 1957		
Replay	Sheffield United	1–1	Huddersfield Town	7 January 1957		
2nd replay	Huddersfield Town	2–1	Sheffield United	14 January 1957		^{[B]}
27	Newport County	3–3	Southampton	5 January 1957	18,562	
Replay	Southampton	0–1	Newport County	9 January 1957	22,372	
28	Arsenal	4–2	Stoke City	5 January 1957		
29	Leeds United	1–2	Cardiff City	5 January 1957		
30	New Brighton	2–1	Torquay United	5 January 1957		
31	Peterborough United	2–2	Lincoln City	5 January 1957		
Replay	Lincoln City	4–5	Peterborough United	9 January 1957		
32	Leyton Orient	0–2	Chelsea	5 January 1957		

=== Fourth round ===
The matches were played on Saturday, 26 January 1957. No replays were necessary. Rhyl, New Brighton and Peterborough United were the last non-league clubs left in the competition.

Tie no	Home team	Score	Away team	Date	Attendance	Notes
1	Blackpool	6–2	Fulham	26 January 1957		
2	Bristol City	3–0	Rhyl	26 January 1957	29,438	
3	Burnley	9–0	New Brighton	26 January 1957		
4	Wolverhampton Wanderers	0–1	Bournemouth & Boscombe Athletic	26 January 1957	41,752	
5	Middlesbrough	2–3	Aston Villa	26 January 1957	42,396	
6	West Bromwich Albion	4–2	Sunderland	26 January 1957	48,010	
7	Everton	2–1	West Ham United	26 January 1957	55,245	
8	Wrexham	0–5	Manchester United	26 January 1957	34,445	
9	Tottenham Hotspur	4–0	Chelsea	26 January 1957	66,398	
10	Bristol Rovers	1–4	Preston North End	26 January 1957		
11	Portsmouth	1–3	Nottingham Forest	26 January 1957		
12	Millwall	2–1	Newcastle United	26 January 1957	45,646	
13	Southend United	1–6	Birmingham City	26 January 1957	30,000	
14	Huddersfield Town	3–1	Peterborough United	26 January 1957		
15	Cardiff City	0–1	Barnsley	26 January 1957		
16	Newport County	0–2	Arsenal	26 January 1957	22,450	

=== Fifth round ===
The matches were played on Saturday, 16 February 1957. Two matches were drawn and replayed later the same week.

Tie no	Home team	Score	Away team	Date	Attendance	Notes
1	Blackpool	0–0	West Bromwich Albion	16 February 1957	32,707	
Replay	West Bromwich Albion	2–1	Blackpool	20 February 1957	58,054	
2	Bournemouth & Boscombe Athletic	3–1	Tottenham Hotspur	16 February 1957	25,892	
3	Preston North End	3–3	Arsenal	16 February 1957		
Replay	Arsenal	2–1	Preston North End	19 February 1957		
4	Aston Villa	2-1	Bristol City	16 February 1957	63,099	
5	Barnsley	1–2	Nottingham Forest	16 February 1957		
6	Manchester United	1–0	Everton	16 February 1957	61,803	
7	Millwall	1–4	Birmingham City	16 February 1957	41,000	
8	Huddersfield Town	1–2	Burnley	16 February 1957	55,168	

=== Sixth Round ===
2 March 1957

Bournemouth & Boscombe Athletic	1 – 2	Manchester United
Bedford 25'		Berry 60', 65' (pen.)

Dean Court, Bournemouth
Attendance: 28,799^{[C]}

2 March 1957

Burnley	1 – 1	Aston Villa
Aldis 31' (o.g.)		McParland 64'

Turf Moor, Burnley
Attendance: 49,346

Replay

6 March 1957

Aston Villa	2 – 0	Burnley
Dixon 18'; McParland 70'

Villa Park, Birmingham
Attendance: 46,531

2 March 1957

West Bromwich Albion	2 – 2	Arsenal
Allen 22'; Wills 49' (o.g.)		Herd 37'; Clapton 57'

The Hawthorns, West Bromwich
Attendance: 58,459

Replay

5 March 1957

Arsenal	1 – 2	West Bromwich Albion
Holton 80'		Whitehouse 47'; Kevan 77'

Highbury, London
Attendance: 58,757

2 March 1957

Birmingham City	0 – 0	Nottingham Forest

St Andrew's, Birmingham
Attendance: 57,827

Replay

7 March 1957

Nottingham Forest	0 – 1	Birmingham City
		Murphy 53'

City Ground, Nottingham
Attendance: 36,486

=== Semifinals ===
23 March 1957

Aston Villa	2 – 2	West Bromwich Albion
McParland 40', 84'		Whitehouse ?', 45'

Molineux, Wolverhampton
Attendance: 55,649

Replay

28 March 1957

West Bromwich Albion	0 – 1	Aston Villa
		Myerscough 38'

St Andrew's, Birmingham
Attendance: 58,067

23 March 1957

Manchester United	2 – 0	Birmingham City
Berry 12'; Charlton 13'

Hillsborough, Sheffield
Attendance: 65,107

=== Final ===
The final took place on Saturday, 4 May 1957 at Wembley and ended in a victory for Aston Villa over Manchester United by 2–1. The attendance was 100,000.

4 May 1957
15:00 BST

Aston Villa	2–1	Manchester United
McParland 68', 73'		Taylor 83'

Wembley, London
Attendance: 100,000
Referee: F. Coultas

Aston Villa	Manchester United

== Notes ==
A. : Match played at Goodison Park, Liverpool.
B. : Match played at Maine Road, Manchester.
C. : Dean Court's record attendance of 28,799 was set at this match.
