= List of Aston Villa F.C. players =

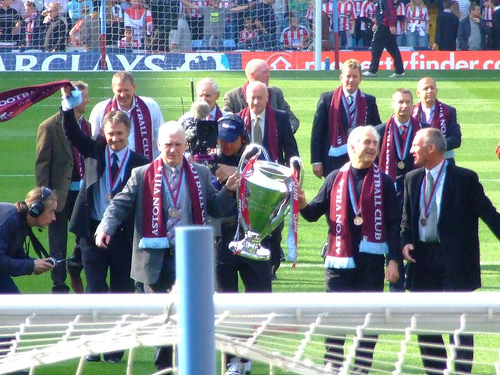
Aston Villa players from the squad that won the 1982 European Cup Final at the 25 years celebration: Jimmy Rimmer, Kenny Swain, Allan Evans, Ken McNaught, Gary Williams, Des Bremner, Gordon Cowans, Dennis Mortimer, Gary Shaw, Tony Morley, Peter Withe, and Nigel Spink

Aston Villa Football Club is an English professional association football club based in Aston, Birmingham, who currently play in the Premier League. The club was founded in 1874 and have played at its current home ground, Villa Park, since 1897. Aston Villa was one of the founding members of The Football League in 1888 and the Premier League in 1992. Aston Villa is one of the most successful clubs in English football history, having won 25 honours in its history.

This is a list of Aston Villa's notable players, generally this means players that have played 100 or more competitive matches for the club, a feat often referred to as joining the 100 club. However, some players who have played fewer matches are also included; players from the club's pre-Football League days, when they played fewer matches in a season than the present day, club captains, record-holders, and players that became coaches or managers at the club are also included. Players who hold records have footnotes describing the record. Players are listed according to the date of their first-team debut for the club. Appearances are for first-team competitive matches only including those as a substitute; wartime matches are excluded as competitions were regarded as invitational or friendly.

In 2024, to commemorate Aston Villa's 150th anniversary, every player to represent Aston Villa in a competitive first team fixture was given a unique "legacy number".

== Notable players ==
- Statistics correct as of 21 November 2026.

This and the † indicate that they hold or held a club or national record
This and the * indicate that they played their full professional career at Aston Villa.
(n/a) = Information not available
Players in bold are still playing for the club.

Legacy number	Name	Nationality	Position	Aston Villa career	Captaincy	Appearances	Goals	Notes
n/a	Walter H. Price	England	Defender	1874	1874–1876	n/a	n/a	†
5	Archie Hunter	Scotland	Forward	1878–1890	1882–1891	73	42	
12	George Ramsay	Scotland	Forward	1876–1882	1876–1882	n/a	n/a	
14	Howard Vaughton	England	Forward	1880–1888	–	26	15	†
32	Albert Brown	England	Forward	1884–1894	–	114	58	†
39	Dennis Hodgetts	England	Midfielder	1886–1896	–	215	91	–
41	Jimmy Warner	England	Goalkeeper	1886–1892	–	101	0	–
44	Gershom Cox	England	Defender	1878–1893	–	101	0	–
56	James Cowan	Scotland	Midfielder	1889–1902*	–	354	27	–
73	Charlie Athersmith	England	Winger	1891–1901	–	307	85	–
74	Jack Devey	England	Forward	1891–1902	1891–1898	304	187	†
96	Jack Reynolds	England	Midfielder	1893–1897	–	110	17	–
99	Willie Groves	Scotland	Midfielder, Forward	1893–1894	–	22	4	†
100	Stephen Smith	England	Forward	1893–1901	–	184	42	–
108	Howard Spencer	England	Defender	1892–1907	1902–1906	292	2	
112	Jimmy Crabtree	England	Defender	1895–1904	1898–1902	200	7	–
116	Fred Wheldon	England	Forward	1896–1900	–	137	74	–
118	Albert Evans	England	Defender	1896–1906	–	206	0	–
122	Billy George	England	Goalkeeper	1897–1911*	–	401	0	–
123	Tommy Bowman	Scotland	Midfielder	1897–1901	–	113	2	–
126	Billy Garraty	England	Forward	1897–1908	–	255	112	–
129	George Johnson	England	Forward	1897–1905	–	110	47	–
131	Albert Wilkes	England	Midfielder	1898–1907	–	157	8	–
142	Joe Pearson	England	Midfielder	1900–1908	–	118	7	–
144	Joe Bache	England	Forward	1900–1914	1906–1914	474	185	
147	Alf Wood	England	Defender	1900–1905	–	111	7	–
152	Willie Clarke	Scotland	Forward	1901–1905	–	41	5	†
160	William Brawn	England	Forward	1901–1906	–	107	20	–
163	Alex Leake	England	Midfielder	1902–1907	–	140	9	–
169	Bert Hall	England	Forward	1903–1913	–	214	62	–
170	Alf Miles	England	Defender	1902–1914	–	269	0	–
175	Harry Hampton	England	Forward	1904–1920	–	376	242	†
182	James Logan	Scotland	Defender	1905–1912	–	157	4	–
183	Joe Walters	England	Forward	1905–1912	–	121	41	–
191	Chris Buckley	England	Forward	1906–1914	–	143	3	–
195	George Tranter	England	Midfielder	1905–1915	–	174	1	–
196	Charlie Wallace	England	Forward	1907–1921	–	349	57	–
201	Tom Lyons	England	Defender	1907–1915	–	238	0	–
220	Clem Stephenson	England	Forward	1910–1921	–	216	96	
228	Tommy Weston	England	Defender	1911–1922	–	179	0	–
236	Andy Ducat	England	Midfield	1912–1921	1919–1921	87	4	
238	Sam Hardy	England	Goalkeeper	1912–1921	–	183	0	
239	Jimmy Harrop	England	Defender	1912–1921	–	171	4	–
258	Frank Moss	England	Defender; Midfielder	1914–1929	1921–1927	283	9	–
260	Richard York	England	Forward	1915–1931	–	390	86	–
263	Arthur Dorrell	England	Forward	1919–1931	–	390	65	
272	Frank Barson	England	Midfielder	1919–1922	–	108	10	–
273	Billy Kirton	England	Forward	1919–1928	–	261	59	–
276	Billy Walker	England	Forward	1919–1933*	1927–1933	531	244	†
278	Tommy Smart	England	Defender	1920–1934	–	452	8	–
279	Tommy Ball	England	Defender	1920–1923	–	77	0	
280	Cyril Spiers	England	Goalkeeper	1920–1927	–	112	0	–
282	Tommy Jackson	England	Goalkeeper	1919–1930	–	186	0	–
283	George Blackburn	England	Midfielder	1920–1926	–	145	2	–
289	Jock Johnstone	Scotland	Defender	1921–1927	–	115	1	–
290	Len Capewell	England	Forward	1921–1930	–	156	100	–
292	Thomas Mort	England	Defender	1921–1935	–	368	2	–
296	Vic Milne	Scotland	Defender	1923–1929	–	175	1	–
298	Teddy Bowen	England	Defender	1923–1934	–	199	0	–
299	Alec Talbot	England	Defender	1923–1936	1933–1934	263	7	–
319	Billy Kingdon	England	Midfielder	1926–1936	–	241	5	–
322	Jimmy Gibson	Scotland	Defender	1927–1936	–	197	9	–
323	Joseph Beresford	England	Forward	1927–1935	–	251	73	–
327	Joe Tate	England	Midfielder	1925–1935	–	193	4	–
331	Tom Waring	England	Forward	1928–1935	–	226	167	†
333	George Brown	England	Forward	1929–1934	–	126	89	–
334	Eric Houghton	England	Forward	1927–1946	1934–1936	392	170	
335	Fred Biddlestone	England	Goalkeeper	1930–1939	–	160	0	–
337	Jack Mandley	England	Forward	1929–1934	–	112	26	–
341	Dai Astley	Wales	Forward	1931–1936	–	173	100	–
342	Danny Blair	Scotland	Defender	1931–1936	–	138	0	–
343	Harry Morton	England	Goalkeeper	1930–1937	–	207	0	–
349	Ernie Callaghan	England	Defender	1930–1947*	–	142	0	
353	Ronnie Dix	England	Striker	1932–1937	–	104	30	–
355	Jimmy Allen	England	Midfielder	1934–(n/a)	–	160	3	–
359	Frank Broome	England	Forward	1934–1946	–	151	90	–
361	Tom Griffiths	Wales	Midfielder	1935–1939	1936–1937	67	1	–
362	George Cummings	Scotland	Defender	1935–1949	1938–1939	232	0	–
366	Alex Massie	Scotland	Midfielder	1935–1945	1937–1938	152	5	
376	Freddie Haycock	England	Forward	1936–1939	–	110	33	–
377	Bob Iverson	England	Defender	1936–1948	–	153	12	–
385	Frank Moss	England	Midfielder	1938–1951	–	313	3	–
386	George Edwards	England	Forward	1938–1956	–	152	41	–
389	Joe Rutherford	England	Goalkeeper	1939–1951	–	156	0	–
390	Eddie Lowe	England	Midfielder	1945–1950	–	117	3	–
391	Harry Parkes	England	Defender; Utility	1939–1955*	–	345	4	–
393	Leslie Smith	England	Forward	1945–1952	–	197	37	–
394	Billy Goffin	England	Forward	1937–1954	–	173	42	–
396	Johnny Dixon	England	Forward	1945–1961*	1955–1959	430	144	
401	Dicky Dorsett	England	Defender	1946–1953	1949–1951	271	36	–
402	Amos Moss	England	Defender	1945–1956	–	109	5	–
404	Trevor Ford	Wales	Forward	1947–1950	–	128	61	
407	Keith Jones	Wales	Goalkeeper	1946–1957	–	199	0	–
412	Con Martin	Republic of Ireland/ Ireland	Goalkeeper; Utility	1948–1956	–	213	1	–
417	Colin Gibson	England	Forward	1949–1956	–	167	26	–
421	Tommy Thompson	England	Forward	1950–1955	–	165	75	–
422	Stan Lynn	England	Defender	1950–1961	–	323	38	–
424	Davy Walsh	Ireland/ Republic of Ireland	Striker	1950–1955	–	114	40	–
426	Peter Aldis	England	Defender	1948–1960	–	294	1	–
427	Danny Blanchflower	Northern Ireland	Midfielder	1951–1954	1951–1955	155	10	
428	Derek Pace	England	Forward	1950–1958	–	107	42	–
431	Peter McParland	Northern Ireland	Forward	1952–1962	–	340	120	†
435	Billy Baxter	England	Midfielder	1953–1957	–	108	6	–
439	Vic Crowe	Wales	Midfielder	1951–1964	1959–1964	351	12	
447	Pat Saward	Republic of Ireland	Defender	1955–1961	–	168	2	–
448	Jackie Sewell	England	Forward	1955–1959	–	144	40	–
450	Jimmy Dugdale	England	Defender	1956–1962	–	244	3	–
452	Leslie Smith	England	Forward	1956–1960	–	129	25	–
453	Nigel Sims	England	Goalkeeper	1956–1964	–	308	0	–
460	Gerry Hitchens	England	Forward	1957–1961	–	160	96	–
462	Gordon Lee	England	Defender	1955–1966	–	142	2	–
467	Ron Wylie	Scotland	Midfielder; Forward	1958–1965	–	244	28	–
470	Jimmy MacEwan	Scotland	Forward	1959–1966	–	181	31	–
472	John Neal	England	Defender	1959–1963	–	114	0	–
473	Bobby Thomson	Scotland	Forward	1959–1963	–	171	70	–
474	Alan Deakin	England	Midfielder	1956–1969	1964–1969	270	9	–
475	Harry Burrows	England	Forward	1956–1965	–	181	73	–
476	Mike Tindall	England	Midfielder	1956–1961	–	134	4	–
486	Alan Baker	England	Defender	1960–1966	–	109	17	–
485	John Sleeuwenhoek	England	Defender	1961–1967	–	260	1	–
488	Charlie Aitken	Scotland	Defender	1959–1976	1966–1973	660	16	†
496	Phil Woosnam	Wales	Forward	1962–1966	–	125	30	–
498	Lew Chatterley	England	Defender; Midfielder	1960–1971	–	160	27	–
500	Tony Hateley	England	Forward	1963–1966	–	148	86	–
501	Mick Wright	England	Defender	1962–1973	–	315	1	–
502	Dave Pountney	England	Midfielder	1963–1968	–	128	7	–
503	Stan Horne	England	Midfielder	1963–1965	–	6	0	
506	Johnny MacLeod	Scotland	Right-winger	1964–1968	–	139	18	–
511	Colin Withers	England	Goalkeeper	1964–1969	–	163	0	–
512	Keith Bradley	England	Defender; Midfielder	1962–1972	–	135	9	–
519	William Anderson	England	Forward	1967–1973	–	263	45	–
523	Brian Godfrey	England	Midfielder; Forward	1967–1971	–	260	25	–
525	Fred Turnbull	England	Defender	1967–1975	–	183	3	–
527	John Dunn	England	Goalkeeper	1967–1971	–	118	0	–
532	Brian Tiler	England	Defender	1968–1973	–	127	4	–
536	Chico Hamilton	England	Forward	1969–1976	–	234	48	–
537	Pat McMahon	Scotland	Midfielder	1969–1976	–	149	30	–
538	Bruce Rioch	Scotland	Midfielder	1969–1974	–	175	37	–
547	Andy Lochhead	Scotland	Forward	1970–1973	–	153	47	–
551	Geoff Vowden	England	Striker	1971–1974	–	114	25	–
552	Ray Graydon	England	Forward	1971–1977	–	230	81	–
555	Brian Little	England	Forward	1970–1979	–	301	82	
556	Jimmy Cumbes	England	Goalkeeper	1971–1976	–	182	0	–
557	Ian Ross	Scotland	Defender	1972–1976	1974–1976	204	3	
558	Chris Nicholl	England	Defender	1972–1977	1976–1977	251	20	
560	John Gidman	England	Defender	1972–1980	–	243	9	–
562	John Robson	England	Defender	1972–1978	–	176	1	–
569	Frank Carrodus	England	Midfielder	1974–1979	–	196	10	–
572	Leighton Phillips	Wales	Defender	1974–1978	–	175	4	–
578	Andy Gray	Scotland	Forward	1975–1979; 1985–1987	–	209	78	
579	John Deehan	England	Midfielder	1973–1979	–	139	51	–
580	Dennis Mortimer	England	Midfielder	1975–1985	1977–1984	405	36	
582	Gordon Cowans	England	Midfielder	1976–1985; 1988–1991; 1993–1994	–	528	59	†
589	John Gregory	England	Forward	1977–1979	–	76	11	
590	Ken McNaught	Scotland	Defender	1977–1983	–	259	14	–
591	Jimmy Rimmer	England	Goalkeeper	1977–1983	–	287	0	–
594	Allan Evans	Scotland	Defender	1977–1989	1984–1989	469	62	–
596	Gary Shaw	England	Forward	1978–1988	–	165	78	
598	Gary Williams	England	Defender	1975–1987	–	303	2	–
599	Brendan Ormsby	England	Defender	1978–1986	–	140	7	–
601	Colin Gibson	England	Defender	1976–1985	–	238	17	–
602	Kenny Swain	England	Defender	1978–1983	–	178	2	–
604	Tony Morley	England	Midfielder	1979–1983	–	179	34	–
606	Des Bremner	Scotland	Midfielder	1979–1984	–	226	10	–
611	Nigel Spink	England	Goalkeeper	1977–1996	–	454	0	–
615	Peter Withe	England	Forward	1980–1985	–	182	90	
618	Mark Walters	England	Midfielder	1981–1987	–	224	48	–
619	Paul Birch	England	Midfielder	1978–1991	–	188	25	–
628	Tony Dorigo	England	Defender	1983–1987	–	135	1	–
633	Tony Daley	England	Midfielder	1985–1994	–	290	38	–
645	Kevin Gage	England	Defender	1987–1992	–	145	12	–
652	Stuart Gray	England	Midfielder	1987–1991	1989–1992	132	15	–
653	David Platt	England	Midfielder	1988–1991	–	145	68	
655	Chris Price	England	Defender	1988–1992	–	142	4	–
657	Ian Olney	England	Forward	1988–1992	–	114	21	–
663	Paul McGrath	Republic of Ireland	Defender	1989–1996	–	321	10	
668	Dwight Yorke	Trinidad and Tobago	Forward	1989–1998	–	287	98	–
670	Dalian Atkinson	England	Forward	1991–1995	–	114	38	–
673	Kevin Richardson	England	Midfielder	1991–1995	1992–1995	188	16	–
674	Steve Staunton	Republic of Ireland	Defender	1991–1998; 2000–2003	2002–2003	350	19	–
675	Shaun Teale	England	Defender	1991–1995	–	185	5	–
676	Ugo Ehiogu	England	Defender	1991–2000	–	285	17	–
684	Garry Parker	England	Midfielder	1991–1995	–	119	14	–
687	Earl Barrett	England	Defender	1992–1995	–	132	2	–
688	Mark Bosnich	Australia	Goalkeeper	1992–1999	–	227	0	–
689	Ray Houghton	Republic of Ireland	Midfielder	1992–1995	–	121	11	–
691	Dean Saunders	Wales	Forward	1992–1995	–	142	49	–
693	Andy Townsend	Republic of Ireland	Midfielder	1993–1997	1995–1997	177	11	–
701	Ian Taylor	England	Midfielder	1994–2003	–	293	43	–
705	Alan Wright	England	Defender	1995–2003	–	331	5	–
706	Mark Draper	England	Midfielder	1995–2000	–	141	14	–
707	Savo Milošević	Serbia and Montenegro/ Serbia	Forward	1995–1998	–	117	34	–
708	Gareth Southgate	England	Defender	1995–2001	1997–2001	244	9	–
712	Lee Hendrie	England	Midfielder	1993–2007	–	308	32	–
713	Julian Joachim	England	Striker	1996–2001	–	173	46	–
724	Gareth Barry	England	Defender; Midfielder	1998–2009	2006–2008	441	52	–
726	Darius Vassell	England	Forward	1997–2005	–	162	35	–
727	Paul Merson	England	Midfielder	1998–2002	2001–2002	145	19	–
731	Dion Dublin	England	Defender; Forward	1998–2004	–	190	59	–
734	Steve Stone	England	Midfielder	1999–2002	–	121	7	–
736	Mark Delaney	Wales	Defender	1999–2007	–	193	2	
737	George Boateng	Ghana	Midfielder	1999–2002	–	127	5	
751	Thomas Hitzlsperger	Germany	Midfielder	2001–2005	–	110	13	–
754	Peter Schmeichel	Denmark	Goalkeeper	2001–2002	–	36	1	
741	Jlloyd Samuel	Trinidad and Tobago	Defender	1999–2007	–	199	3	–
752	Juan Pablo Ángel	Colombia	Forward	2001–2007	–	205	66	–
756	Olof Mellberg	Sweden	Defender	2001–2008	2003–2006	263	8	†
771	Gavin McCann	England	Midfielder	2003–2007	–	129	5	–
772	Thomas Sørensen	Denmark	Goalkeeper	2003–2008	–	158	0	–
776	Martin Laursen	Denmark	Defender	2004–2009	2008–2009	91	11	–
777	Steven Davis	Northern Ireland	Midfielder	2004–2007	–	109	9	–
785	James Milner	England	Midfielder	2005–2006; 2008–2010	–	126	22	
790	Gabriel Agbonlahor	England	Forward	2005–2018*	2015–2016	391	86	(Note: Gabriel Agbonlahor was designated club captain while Micah Richards was designated team captain during the 2015–16 Premier League campaign. Agbonlahor resigned the position following a suspension from first team duties in April 2016. Richards was replaced by Tommy Elphick as captain in August 2016.)
791	Stiliyan Petrov	Bulgaria	Midfielder	2006–2013	2009–2012	219	12	–
797	John Carew	Norway	Forward	2007–2011	–	143	47	–
798	Ashley Young	England	Defender; Winger	2007–2011; 2021–2023	2022–2023	247	39	(Note: Ashley Young was designated club captain while John McGinn was designated captain by manager Steven Gerrard at the start of the 2022-23 Premier League campaign.)
800	Nigel Reo-Coker	England	Midfielder	2007–2011	–	122	3	–
808	Brad Friedel	United States	Goalkeeper	2008–2011	–	131	0	†
812	Carlos Cuéllar	Spain	Defender	2008–2012	–	120	3	–
813	Brad Guzan	United States	Goalkeeper	2008–2016	–	127	0	–
815	Emile Heskey	England	Forward	2008–2012	–	110	14	–
816	Marc Albrighton	England	Midfielder	2009–2014	–	101	9	–
818	Fabian Delph	England	Midfielder	2009–2015	2015	134	8	–
820	Ciaran Clark	Republic of Ireland	Defender	2009–2016	–	159	10	–
821	James Collins	Wales	Defender	2009–2012	–	110	6	–
822	Richard Dunne	Republic of Ireland	Defender	2009–2013	–	111	4	–
823	Stephen Warnock	England	Defender	2009–2012	–	104	4	–
825	Andreas Weimann	Austria	Forward	2010–2015	–	129	24	–
838	Alan Hutton	Scotland	Defender	2011–2019	–	193	3	–
846	Ron Vlaar	Netherlands	Defender	2012–2015	2012–2015	88	2	–
849	Ashley Westwood	England	Midfielder	2012–2017	–	102	3	–
850	Christian Benteke	Belgium	Forward	2012–2015	–	101	49	–
857	Leandro Bacuna	Curaçao	Midfielder	2013–2017	–	129	8	–
866	Jack Grealish	England	Midfielder	2014–2021	2019–2021	213	32	†
879	Micah Richards	England	Defender	2015–2019	2015–2016	31	2	
889	Tommy Elphick	England	Defender	2016–2019	2016	46	1	–
893	James Chester	Wales	Defender	2016–2020	2016–2017; 2018–2019	121	10	–
895	Mile Jedinak	Australia	Midfielder	2016–2019		80	2	
896	Jonathan Kodjia	Ivory Coast	Forward	2016–2020	–	105	31	–
897	Albert Adomah	Ghana	Forward	2016–2019		103	18	–
902	Conor Hourihane	Republic of Ireland	Midfielder	2017–2022	–	133	28	–
905	Neil Taylor	Wales	Midfielder	2017–2021	–	103	0	†
907	Ahmed Elmohamady	Egypt	Defender	2017–2021	–	129	4	–
908	John Terry	England	Defender	2017–2018	2017–2018	37	1	
919	**John McGinn**	Scotland	Midfielder	2018–	2022–	347	43	†
922	Anwar El Ghazi	Netherlands	Forward	2018–2022	–	119	26	–
927	**Tyrone Mings**	England	Defender	2019–	2021–22	219	9	–
929	Jacob Ramsey	England	Midfielder	2019–2025		167	17	–
935	Douglas Luiz	Brazil	Midfielder	2019–2024; 2026	–	224	23	–
937	Ezri Konsa	England	Defender	2019–2026		286	12	–
946	Ollie Watkins	England	Forward	2020–2026		278	108	†
947	**Matty Cash**	Poland	Defender	2020–		241	13	–
948	Emiliano Martínez	Argentina	Goalkeeper	2020–2026	–	256	0	†
970	**Emiliano Buendía**	Argentina	Midfielder	2021–		166	24	–
972	Leon Bailey	Jamaica	Forward	2021–2026		163	23	–
975	Lucas Digne	France	Defender	2022–2026		181	4	–
981	**Boubacar Kamara**	France	Midfielder	2022–		137	3	–
988	**Pau Torres**	Spain	Defender	2023–		121	2	–
989	Youri Tielemans	Belgium	Midfielder	2023–2026		134	10	–
996	Morgan Rogers	England	Midfielder	2024–2026		125	31	–
999	**Ian Maatsen**	Netherlands	Defender	2024–		101	3	–
