= List of Aston Villa F.C. seasons =

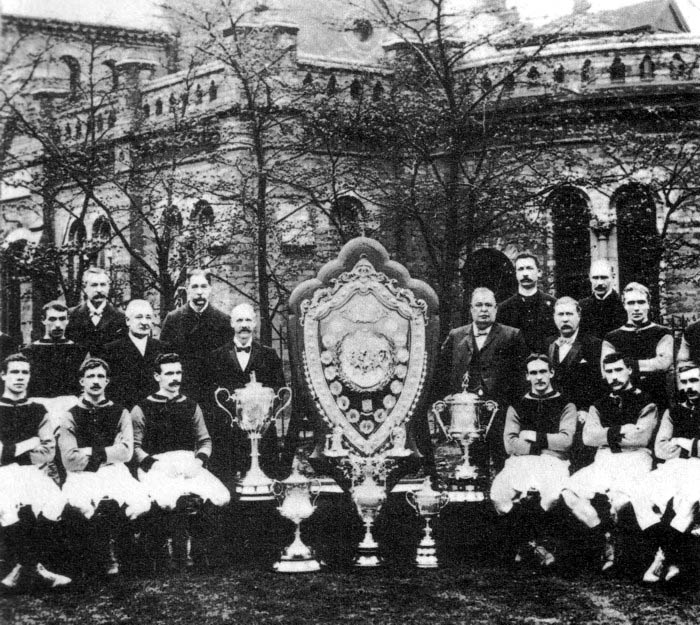
The Aston Villa team of 1897 that won The Double.

This is a list of seasons played by Aston Villa Football Club in English and European football, from 1879 (the year of the club's first FA Cup entry) to the most recent completed season. Aston Villa football club was founded in March, 1874, by members of the Wesleyan Chapel at Villa Cross in Aston. Throughout the 1870s, Aston Villa played a small number of games. At least one game, against Aston Brook St Mary's was played with one half under Rugby rules and the other under football rules. In the 1880s, the game became more formalised and in 1888, William McGregor formed the Football League with eleven other clubs.

The club has won the League Championship seven times, the FA Cup seven times, the EFL Cup five times, the Charity Shield once (shared), the European Cup once, the Europa League once, the European Super Cup once and the Intertoto Cup twice.

This list details the club's achievements in all major competitions, and the top scorers for each season. Top scorers in bold were also the top scorers in the English league that season. Records of competitions such as the Birmingham Senior Cup are not included due to them being considered of less importance than the FA Cup and the EFL Cup.

== Seasons ==
Season	Division	Pld	W	D	L	GF	GA	Pts	Pos	FA Cup	EFL Cup (Note: The EFL Cup was founded in 1961.)	Europe / Other		Player(s)	Goals
Season	League									FA Cup	EFL Cup	Europe / Other		Top goalscorer(s) (Note: Goals in all competitions (Football League or Premier League, FA Cup, EFL Cup and European) are counted.)	
1879–80	N/A									R3					
1880–81	N/A									R4					
1881–82	N/A									R4					
1882–83	N/A									QF					
1883–84	N/A									QF					
1884–85	N/A									R3					
1885–86	N/A									R2					
1886–87	N/A									**W**					
1887–88	N/A									R5					
1888–89	FL (Note: Aston Villa was a founding member of the Football League.)	22	12	5	5	61	42	29	2nd	R3				Albert Allen	19
1889–90	FL	22	7	5	10	43	51	19	8th	R2				Dennis Hodgetts	11
1890–91	FL	22	7	4	11	45	58	18	9th	R2				Arthur Brown	13
1891–92	FL	26	15	0	11	89	56	30	4th	RU				John Devey	34
1892–93	Div 1 (Note: The Football League expanded to two divisions in 1892, absorbing most of the teams from the Football Alliance. The league previously known simply as the Football League became the Football League First Division.)	30	16	3	11	73	62	35	4th	R1				John Devey	19
1893–94	Div 1	30	19	6	5	84	42	44	**1st**	R3				John Devey	22
1894–95	Div 1	30	17	5	8	82	43	39	3rd	**W**				John Devey	19
1895–96	Div 1	30	20	5	5	78	45	45	**1st**	R1				John Campbell	26
1896–97 (Note: In this season Aston Villa became the second team to win the double and are one of eight clubs that have done it as of 2019.)	Div 1	30	21	5	4	73	38	47	**1st**	**W**				Fred Wheldon	22
1897–98	Div 1	30	14	5	11	61	51	33	6th	R5				Fred Wheldon	23
1898–99	Div 1	34	19	7	8	76	40	45	**1st**	R1				John Devey	21
1899–1900	Div 1	34	22	6	6	77	35	50	**1st**	R3				Billy Garraty	30
1900–01	Div 1	34	10	10	14	45	51	30	15th	SF				John Devey	15
1901–02	Div 1	34	13	8	13	42	40	34	8th	R1				Jasper McLuckie	16
1902–03	Div 1	34	19	3	12	61	40	41	2nd	SF				Jasper McLuckie	20
1903–04	Div 1	34	17	7	10	70	48	41	5th	R2				Joe Bache	16
1904–05	Div 1	34	19	4	11	63	43	42	4th	**W**				Harry Hampton	22
1905–06	Div 1	38	17	6	15	72	56	40	8th	R3				Billy Garraty	22
1906–07	Div 1	38	19	6	13	78	52	44	5th	R2				Harry Hampton	21
1907–08	Div 1	38	17	9	12	77	59	43	2nd	R3				Joe Bache	25
1908–09	Div 1	38	14	10	14	58	56	38	7th	R1				Joe Bache	11
1909–10	Div 1	38	23	7	8	84	42	53	**1st**	R3				Harry Hampton	29
1910–11	Div 1	38	22	7	9	69	41	51	2nd	R2		FA Charity Shield	RU	Harry Hampton	21
1911–12	Div 1	38	17	7	14	76	63	41	6th	R2				Harry Hampton	28
1912–13	Div 1	38	19	12	7	86	52	50	2nd	**W**				Harry Hampton	30
1913–14	Div 1	38	19	6	13	65	50	44	2nd	SF				Harry Hampton	24
1914–15	Div 1	38	13	11	14	62	72	37	14th	R2				Harry Hampton	20
No competitive football was played between 1915 and 1919 due to the First World War
1919–20	Div 1	42	18	6	18	75	73	42	9th	**W**				Clem Stephenson	29
1920–21	Div 1	42	18	7	17	63	70	43	10th	R4				Billy Walker	31
1921–22	Div 1	42	22	3	17	74	55	47	5th	R4				Ian Dickson	28
1922–23	Div 1	42	18	10	14	64	51	46	6th	R1				Billy Walker	23
1923–24	Div 1	42	18	13	11	52	37	49	6th	RU				Len Capewell	26
1924–25	Div 1	42	13	13	16	58	71	39	15th	R3				Billy Walker	25
1925–26	Div 1	42	16	12	14	86	76	44	6th	R5				Len Capewell	34
1926–27	Div 1	42	18	7	17	81	83	43	10th	R3				Len Capewell	16
1927–28	Div 1	42	17	9	16	78	73	43	8th	R5				George Cook	27
1928–29	Div 1	42	23	4	15	98	81	50	3rd	SF				Pongo Waring	32
1929–30	Div 1	42	21	5	16	92	83	47	4th	QF				George Brown	30
1930–31	Div 1	42	25	9	8	128 (Note: English record goals total for any club in the top flight, and for any club in a 42-game season. Aston Villa's 86 goals scored at home this season is a record for any club in the top division.)	78	59	2nd	R3				**Pongo Waring**	50 (Note: Club record for most league goals (49) and most goals in total (50) scored in a season.)
1931–32	Div 1	42	19	8	15	104	72	46	5th	R4				Pongo Waring	30
1932–33	Div 1	42	23	8	11	92	67	54	2nd	R4				George Brown	35
1933–34	Div 1	42	14	12	16	78	75	40	13th	SF				Dai Astley	33
1934–35	Div 1	42	14	13	15	74	88	41	13th	R3				Dai Astley	21
1935–36	Div 1	42	13	9	20	81	110	35	21st↓	R3				Dai Astley	21
1936–37	**Div 2**	42	16	12	14	82	70	44	9th	R3				Frank Broome	29
1937–38	Div 2	42	25	7	10	73	35	57	**1st**	SF				Frank Broome	25
1938–39	**Div 1**	42	16	9	17	71	60	41	12th	R4				Frank Broome	16
No competitive football was played between 1939 and 1946 due to the Second World War
1945–46	N/A (Note: The FA Cup was contested in 1945–46 but the Football League did not resume until the following season.)									QF					
1946–47	Div 1	42	18	9	15	67	53	45	8th	R3				Dicky Dorsett	13
1947–48	Div 1	42	19	9	14	65	57	47	6th	R3				Trevor Ford	18
1948–49	Div 1	42	16	10	16	60	76	42	10th	R4				Trevor Ford	14
1949–50	Div 1	42	15	12	15	61	61	42	12th	R3				Trevor Ford	18
1950–51	Div 1	42	12	13	17	66	68	37	15th	R4				Johnny Dixon	16
1951–52	Div 1	42	19	9	14	79	70	47	6th	R3				Johnny Dixon	28
1952–53	Div 1	42	14	13	15	63	61	41	11th	QF				Johnny Dixon	14
1953–54	Div 1	42	16	9	17	70	68	41	13th	R3				Tommy Thompson	21
1954–55	Div 1	42	20	7	15	72	73	47	6th	R4				Tommy Thompson	20
1955–56	Div 1	42	11	13	18	52	69	35	20th	R4				Johnny Dixon	18
1956–57	Div 1	42	14	15	13	65	55	43	10th	**W**				Peter McParland	19
1957–58	Div 1	42	16	7	19	73	86	39	14th	R3		FA Charity Shield	RU	Peter McParland	17
1958–59	Div 1	42	11	8	23	58	87	30	21st↓	SF				Gerry Hitchens	18
1959–60	**Div 2**	42	25	9	8	89	43	59	**1st**	SF				Gerry Hitchens	25
1960–61	**Div 1**	42	17	9	16	78	77	43	9th	R5	**W** (Note: First winners of the League Cup.)			Gerry Hitchens	42
1961–62	Div 1	42	18	8	16	65	56	44	7th	QF	R3			Harry Burrows	20
1962–63	Div 1	42	15	8	19	62	68	38	15th	R4	RU			Harry Burrows	22
1963–64	Div 1	42	11	12	19	62	71	34	19th	R3	R3			Tony Hateley	19
1964–65	Div 1	42	16	5	21	57	82	37	16th	R5	SF			Tony Hateley	34
1965–66	Div 1	42	15	6	21	69	80	36	16th	R3	QF			Tony Hateley	28
1966–67	Div 1	42	11	7	24	54	85	29	21st↓	R4	R2			Lew Chatterley	13
1967–68	**Div 2**	42	15	7	20	54	64	37	16th	R4	R2			Brian Godfrey	13
1968–69	Div 2	42	12	14	16	37	48	38	18th	R5	R2			Brian Godfrey	7
1969–70	Div 2	42	8	13	21	36	62	29	21st↓	R3	R2			Bruce Rioch	6
1970–71	**Div 3**	46	19	15	12	54	46	53	4th (Note: Lowest League finish.)	R1	RU			Andy Lochhead	13
1971–72	Div 3	46	32	6	8	85	32	70	**1st**	R1	R4			Andy Lochhead	25
1972–73	**Div 2**	42	18	14	10	51	47	50	3rd	R3	R3	FA Charity Shield	RU	Alun Evans	11
1973–74	Div 2	42	13	15	14	48	45	41	14th	R5	R2			Sammy Morgan	9
1974–75	Div 2	42	25	8	9	79	32	58	2nd↑	R5	**W**			Ray Graydon	27
1975–76	**Div 1**	42	11	17	14	51	59	39	16th	R3	R3	UEFA Cup	R1	Ray Graydon	14
1976–77	Div 1	42	22	7	13	76	50	51	4th	QF	**W**			Andy Gray	29
1977–78	Div 1	42	18	10	14	57	42	46	8th	R3	R4	UEFA Cup	QF	Andy Gray	20
1978–79	Div 1	42	15	16	11	59	49	46	8th	R3	R4			John Deehan	10
1979–80	Div 1	42	16	14	12	51	50	46	7th	QF	R3			Gary Shaw	13
1980–81	Div 1	42	26	8	8	72	40	60	**1st**	R3	R3			Peter Withe	21
1981–82 (Note: Villa became the fourth English club to lift the European Cup.)	Div 1	42	15	12	15	55	53	57 (Note: The 1981–82 season saw the introduction of three points for a win.)	11th	R5	QF	FA Charity Shield European Cup	**W** (Note: From 1939 to 1993, in the event of a draw, the Charity Shield would be shared between the two competing teams, with each team having possession of the trophy for six months.) **W**	Peter Withe	17
1982–83	Div 1	42	21	5	16	62	50	68	6th	QF	R2	Super Cup (Note: The European Super Cup was played over two legs in January 1983.) European Cup Intercontinental Cup	**W** QF RU	Gary Shaw	24
1983–84	Div 1	42	17	9	16	59	61	60	10th	R3	SF	UEFA Cup	R2	Peter Withe	22
1984–85	Div 1	42	15	11	16	60	60	56	10th	R3	R3			Paul Rideout	15
1985–86	Div 1	42	10	14	18	51	67	44	16th	R4	SF			Simon Stainrod	21
1986–87	Div 1	42	8	12	22	45	79	36	22nd↓	R3	R4			Allan Evans	8
1987–88	**Div 2**	44	22	12	10	68	41	78	2nd↑	R4	R4			Warren Aspinall	13
1988–89	**Div 1**	38	9	13	16	45	56	40	17th	R4	QF			Alan McInally	22
1989–90	Div 1	38	21	7	10	57	38	70	2nd	QF	R3			David Platt	24
1990–91	Div 1	38	9	14	15	46	58	41	17th	R3	QF	UEFA Cup	R2	David Platt	24
1991–92	Div 1	42	17	9	16	48	44	60	7th	QF	R2			Dwight Yorke	17
1992–93	Prem	42	21	11	10	57	40	74	2nd	R4	R4			Dean Saunders	16
1993–94	Prem	42	15	12	15	46	50	57	10th	R5	**W**	UEFA Cup	R2	Dean Saunders	16
1994–95	Prem	42	11	15	16	51	56	48	18th	R4	R4	UEFA Cup	R2	Dean Saunders	17
1995–96	Prem	38	18	9	11	52	35	63	4th	SF	**W**			Dwight Yorke	25
1996–97	Prem	38	17	10	11	47	34	61	5th	R4	R4	UEFA Cup	R1	Dwight Yorke	20
1997–98	Prem	38	17	6	15	49	48	57	7th	R5	R3	UEFA Cup	QF	Dwight Yorke	16
1998–99	Prem	38	15	10	13	51	46	55	6th	R4	R3	UEFA Cup	R2	Julian Joachim	16
1999–2000	Prem	38	15	13	10	46	35	58	6th	RU	SF			Dion Dublin	16
2000–01	Prem	38	13	15	10	46	43	54	8th	R4	R3	Intertoto Cup	SF	Dion Dublin	9
2001–02	Prem	38	12	14	12	46	47	50	8th	R3	R4	Intertoto Cup UEFA Cup	**W** (Note: Intertoto Cup winners entered the first round of the UEFA Cup this season.) R1	Juan Pablo Ángel	16
2002–03	Prem	38	12	9	17	42	47	45	16th	R3	QF	Intertoto Cup	SF	Dion Dublin	14
2003–04	Prem	38	15	11	12	48	44	56	6th	R3	SF			Juan Pablo Ángel	23
2004–05	Prem	38	12	11	15	45	52	47	10th	R3	R3			Juan Pablo Ángel	9
2005–06	Prem	38	10	12	16	42	55	42	16th	R5	R4			Milan Baroš	12
2006–07	Prem	38	11	17	10	43	41	50	11th	R3	R4			Gabriel Agbonlahor	10
2007–08	Prem	38	16	12	10	71	51	60	6th	R3	R3			John Carew	13
2008–09	Prem	38	17	11	10	54	48	62	6th	R5	R3	Intertoto Cup UEFA Cup	Qualified from R32	John Carew	15
2009–10	Prem	38	17	13	8	52	39	64	6th	SF	RU	UEFA Europa League	PO	John Carew	17
2010–11	Prem	38	12	12	14	48	59	48	9th	R5	QF	UEFA Europa League	PO	Darren Bent Ashley Young	9
2011–12	Prem	38	7	17	14	37	53	38	16th	R4	R3			Darren Bent	10
2012–13	Prem	38	10	11	17	47	69	41	15th	R4	SF			Christian Benteke	23
2013–14	Prem	38	10	8	20	39	61	38	15th	R3	R3			Christian Benteke	11
2014–15	Prem	38	10	8	20	31	57	38	17th	RU	R2			Christian Benteke	15
2015–16	Prem	38	3	8	27	27	76	17	20th↓	R4	R4			Jordan Ayew	7
2016–17	**Champ**	46	16	14	16	47	48	62	13th	R3	R1			Jonathan Kodjia	19
2017–18	Champ	46	24	11	11	72	42	83	4th	R3	R3	League play-offs	RU	Albert Adomah	15
2018–19	Champ	46	20	16	10	82	61	76	5th↑ (Note: Promoted via play-offs)	R3	R2	League play-offs	**W**	Tammy Abraham	26
2019–20	**Prem**	38	9	8	21	41	67	35	17th	R3	RU			Jack Grealish	10
2020–21	Prem	38	16	7	15	55	46	55	11th	R3	R4			Ollie Watkins	16
2021–22	Prem	38	13	6	19	52	54	45	14th	R3	R3			Ollie Watkins	11
2022–23	Prem	38	18	7	13	51	46	61	7th	R3	R3			Ollie Watkins	16
2023–24	Prem	38	20	8	10	76	61	68	4th	R4	R3	UEFA Conference League	SF	Ollie Watkins	27
2024–25	Prem	38	19	9	10	58	51	66	6th	SF	R4	UEFA Champions League	QF	Ollie Watkins	17
2025–26	Prem	38	19	8	11	56	49	65	4th	R4	R3	UEFA Europa League	**W**	Ollie Watkins	21

== Key ==
- Pld – Matches played
- W – Matches won
- D – Matches drawn
- L – Matches lost
- GF – Goals for
- GA – Goals against
- Pts – Points
- Pos – Final position
- FL – Football League
- Div 1 – Football League First Division
- Div 2 – Football League Second Division
- Div 3 – Football League Third Division
- Champ – EFL Championship
- Prem – Premier League
- N/A – Not applicable
- Divisions in **bold** indicate a change in division.
- PO – Play-off round
- R1 – Round 1
- R2 – Round 2
- R3 – Round 3
- R4 – Round 4
- R5 – Round 5
- R32 – Round of 32
- R16 – Round of 16
- QF – Quarter-finals
- SF – Semi-finals
- RU – Runners-up
- W – Winners

Winners	Runners-up	Promoted ↑	Relegated ↓
