= 1946–47 Aston Villa F.C. season =

English football club season

Aston Villa
1946–47 season
- Chairman: Fred Normansell
- Manager: Alex Massie
- Stadium: Villa Park
- First Division: 8th
- FA Cup: Third round
| Home colours | Away colours |

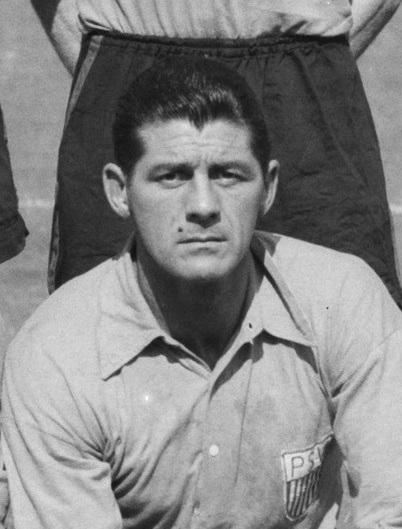
Trevor Ford, top scorer 1947–48 1948-49 and 1949-50

The 1938–39 English football season was Aston Villa's 48th season in The Football League, Villa playing in the Football League First Division. The 1946–47 season was the first to feature a full football programme since the 1938–39 campaign.

George Cummings was the Villains club captain from 1945 to his retirement in 1949, and was popular with supporters due to his never-say-die spirit and no-nonsense defending.

Ernie Callaghan (125) previously held the Aston Villa club record for the oldest first team player, being 39 years 86 days old when he played against Grimsby Town in 1946. In his last game in April 1947, he was 39 years and 257 days. On 1 February 2011, American goalkeeper Brad Friedel set a new club record by playing a first-team game away at Manchester United ages 39 years and 259 days.

In September 1946, Dicky Dorsett (257) joined Aston Villa for £3,000. He would be top scorer for the season. In January 1947, following a disagreement over preparations for a cup tie, Trevor Ford (120) left Swansea for first division Aston Villa. He would become the club's top scorer for three consecutive seasons. There were also debuts for Johnny Dixon, Tommy Dodds, Derek Ashton, John Graham, Arthur Haynes, Amos Moss, Ron Guttridge and Billy Evans.

== League table ==
| Pos | Team | Pld | W | D | L | GF | GA | GAv | Pts |
|---|---|---|---|---|---|---|---|---|---|
| 6 | Sheffield United | 42 | 21 | 7 | 14 | 89 | 75 | 1.187 | 49 |
| 7 | Preston North End | 42 | 18 | 11 | 13 | 76 | 74 | 1.027 | 47 |
| 8 | Aston Villa | 42 | 18 | 9 | 15 | 67 | 53 | 1.264 | 45 |
| 9 | Sunderland | 42 | 18 | 8 | 16 | 65 | 66 | 0.985 | 44 |
| 10 | Everton | 42 | 17 | 9 | 16 | 62 | 67 | 0.925 | 43 |

Source: World Football
Rules for classification: 1) Points; 2) Goal average; 3) Goals scored

=== Matches ===
| 31 August 1946 | Aston Villa | 0–1 | Middlesbrough |
| | | Report |

| 2 September 1946 | Aston Villa | 0–1 | Everton |
| | | Report |

| 7 September 1946 | Derby County | 1–2 | Aston Villa |
| | | Report | Johnny Dixon, 21; George Edwards, 51 |

| 11 September 1946 | Wolves | 1–2 | Aston Villa |
| | | Report | Les Smith, 30; Billy Goffin, 43 |

| 14 September 1946 | Aston Villa | 0–2 | Arsenal |
| | | Report |

| 16 September 1946 | Aston Villa | 3–0 | Wolves |
| | Les Smith, 6; George Edwards, 10, 40 | Report |

| 21 September 1946 | Blackpool | 1–0 | Aston Villa |
| | | Report |

| 28 September 1946 | Aston Villa | 5–2 | Brentford |
| | Own Goal, 10; Jackie Martin, 19; Billy Goffin, 49, 87; John Graham, 59 | Report |

| 5 October 1946 | Blackburn | 0–1 | Aston Villa |
| | | Report | George Edwards, 76 |

| 12 October 1946 | Aston Villa | 1–1 | Portsmouth |
| | Les Smith, 40 | Report |

| 19 October 1946 | Aston Villa | 4–0 | Charlton |
| | Dicky Dorsett, 19; George Edwards, 30; Johnny Dixon, 84, 90 | Report |

| 26 October 1946 | Preston | 3–1 | Aston Villa |
| | | Report | Bob Iverson, 37 |

| 2 November 1946 | Aston Villa | 0–0 | Manchester United |
| | | Report |

| 9 November 1946 | Stoke | 0–0 | Aston Villa |
| | | Report |

| 16 November 1946 | Aston Villa | 1–1 | Bolton |
| | Dicky Dorsett, 54 (pen) | Report |

| 23 November 1946 | Chelsea | 1–3 | Aston Villa |
| | | Report | George Edwards, 17; Jackie Martin, 58; Les Smith |

| 30 November 1946 | Aston Villa | 2–3 | Sheffield United |
| | George Edwards, 10; Jackie Martin, 79 | Report |

| 7 December 1946 | Grimsby | 0–3 | Aston Villa |
| | | Report | Jackie Martin, 23; George Edwards, 64; Dicky Dorsett, 87 |

| 14 December 1946 | Aston Villa | 2–1 | Leeds United |
| | Dicky Dorsett, 10; Les Smith, 28 | Report |

| 21 December 1946 | Liverpool | 4–1 | Aston Villa |
| | | Report | Dicky Dorsett, 24 |

| 25 December 1946 | Aston Villa | 2–2 | Huddersfield |
| | Harry Parkes, 1–0; Jackie Martin, 2–0 | Report |

| 26 December 1946 | Huddersfield | 1–0 | Aston Villa |
| | | Report |

| 28 December 1946 | Middlesbrough | 1–2 | Aston Villa |
| | | Report | Les Smith, 32; George Edwards, 77 |

| 1 January 1947 | Everton | 2–0 | Aston Villa |
| | | Report |

| 4 January 1947 | Aston Villa | 2–0 | Derby County |
| | Jackie Martin, 47; John Graham, 80 | Report |

| 18 January 1947 | Arsenal | 0–2 | Aston Villa |
| | | Report | Les Smith, 3; Dicky Dorsett, 15 |

| 25 January 1947 | Aston Villa | 1–1 | Blackpool |
| | Trevor Ford, 80 | Report |

| 1 February 1947 | Brentford | 0–2 | Aston Villa |
| | | Report | Trevor Ford, 59, 81 |

| 15 February 1947 | Portsmouth | 3–2 | Aston Villa |
| | | Report | Jackie Martin, 28; Trevor Ford, 42 |

| 22 February 1947 | Charlton | 1–1 | Aston Villa |
| | | Report | Own Goal, 49 |

| 8 March 1947 | Manchester United | 2–1 | Aston Villa |
| | | Report | Dicky Dorsett, 36 |

| 22 March 1947 | Bolton | 2–1 | Aston Villa |
| | | Report | Jackie Martin, 31 |

| 29 March 1947 | Aston Villa | 2–0 | Chelsea |
| | Trevor Ford, 9; Dicky Dorsett, 40 | Report |

| 4 April 1947 | Sunderland | 4–1 | Aston Villa |
| | | Report | Johnny Dixon, 33 |

| 5 April 1947 | Sheffield United | 1–2 | Aston Villa |
| | | Report | Dicky Dorsett, 33, 70 |

| 8 April 1947 | Aston Villa | 4–0 | Sunderland |
| | Trevor Ford, 33, 64; Bob Iverson, 35; Dicky Dorsett, 43 | Report |

| 12 April 1947 | Aston Villa | 3–3 | Grimsby |
| | Trevor Ford, 26, 33; George Edwards, 40 | Report |

| 19 April 1947 | Leeds United | 1–1 | Aston Villa |
| | | Report | Dicky Dorsett, 77 |

| 26 April 1947 | Aston Villa | 1–2 | Liverpool |
| | Billy Evans, 6 | Report |

| 10 May 1947 | Aston Villa | 2–1 | Blackburn |
| | Dicky Dorsett, 49; Johnny Dixon, 78 | Report |

| 17 May 1947 | Aston Villa | 4–2 | Preston |
| | Billy Evans, 10, 53; Bob Iverson, 41; Johnny Dixon, 61 | Report |

| 26 May 1947 | Aston Villa | 0–1 | Stoke |
| | | Report |

Source: avfchistory.co.uk

== FA Cup ==
=== Third round ===
The 44 First and Second Division clubs entered the competition at this stage along with Chester, Cardiff City and Crystal Palace.

The matches were scheduled for Saturday, 11 January 1947.

| Tie no | Home team | Score | Away team | Date |
|---|---|---|---|---|
| 4 | Burnley | 5–1 | Aston Villa | 11 January 1947 |
