= 1945–46 Aston Villa F.C. season =

English football club season

Aston Villa
1945–46 season
- Chairman: Fred Normansell
- Manager: Alex Massie
- Stadium: Villa Park
- Football League South: 2nd
- FA Cup: Sixth round

The 1945–46 English football season was the Aston Villa's only season in the Football League South and Villa's 56th season in Football Association competition.

1945–46 was the first peacetime football season since the 1939–40 season was cut short due to World War II. On 7 May (as the war was ending), it was announced that the FA Cup would be resumed, and that the 44 clubs in the top two divisions of the 1938–39 season would play in the Football League North and Football League South without promotion and relegation from the previous peacetime season. This arrangement was debated by the clubs over the following two months – with Wolverhampton Wanderers proposing an immediate return to a peacetime Football League as was to happen in France – before it was agreed at The Football League's annual meeting in London on 25 July that regional leagues should continue for one more season.

To make up for the lack of quality matches, all FA Cup rounds from round one up to and including the quarter-finals were made two-legged ties (rather than the traditional single matches) with the aggregate score determining who went through to the next round. Derby County eventually won the Cup.

From the next season, a full football programme was restored, including The Football League and international matches.

Like all English clubs, Villa lost seven seasons to the Second World War, and that conflict brought several careers to a premature end. The team was rebuilt under the guidance of former player Alex Massie for the remainder of the 1940s. George Cummings was the Villains club captain from 1945 to his retirement in 1949, and was popular with supporters due to his never-say-die spirit and no-nonsense defending. There were debuts for Harry Parkes, Jack Morby, Les Smith, Eddie Lowe and Vic Potts.

== FA Cup ==
5 January 1946	Coventry City	2–1	Aston Villa	Highfield Road
		Report

8 January 1946	Aston Villa	2–0	Coventry City	Villa Park
		Report

26 January 1946	Millwall	2–4	Aston Villa	The Den
		Report

28 January 1946	Aston Villa	9–1	Millwall	Villa Park
		Report

9 February 1946	Chelsea	0–1	Aston Villa	Stamford Bridge
		Report

12 February 1946	Aston Villa	1–0	Chelsea	Villa Park
		Report

2 March 1946	Aston Villa	3–4	Derby County	Villa Park
		Report
Note: 76,588 - Villa's record attendance

9 March 1946	Derby County	1–1	Aston Villa	Baseball Ground
		Report

Source: 1945-46 season www.avfchistory.co.uk

== Football League South ==
Pos	Team	Pld	W	D	L	GF	GA	GR	Pts
1	Birmingham City	42	28	5	9	96	45	2.133	61
2	Aston Villa	42	25	11	6	106	58	1.828	61
3	Charlton Athletic	42	25	10	7	92	45	2.044	60
4	Derby County	42	22	8	12	104	62	1.677	52
5	West Bromwich Albion	42	22	8	12	104	69	1.507	52

Source: rsssf.com and War Hammers II

25 August 1945	Luton Town	1–1	Aston Villa
			Edwards

29 August 1945	West Bromwich Albion	1–0	Aston Villa

1 September 1945	Aston Villa	7–1	Luton Town
	Broome (2), Edwards (4), OG

5 September 1945	Aston Villa	3–3	West Bromwich Albion
	Edwards, Parkes (pen), Goffin

8 September 1945	Aston Villa	6–3	Swansea Town
	Iverson (2), Goffin, Edwards, Kerrr (2)

10 September 1945	Aston Villa	2–1	West Ham United
	Edwards, Martin

15 September 1945	Swansea Town	5–4	Aston Villa
			Goffin, Iverson (2), Kerrr

22 September 1945	Arsenal	2–4	Aston Villa
			Iverson (2), Edwards, Kerrr

29 September 1945	Aston Villa	5–1	Arsenal
	Edwards (4), Broome

6 October 1945	Charlton Athletic	0–0	Aston Villa

13 October 1945	Aston Villa	0–1	Charlton Athletic

20 October 1945	Aston Villa	3–0	Fulham
	Edwards, Broome, Iverson

27 October 1945	Fulham	1–4	Aston Villa
	Edwards (2), Iverson (2)

3 November 1945	Plymouth Argyle	0–3	Aston Villa
			Edwards (3)

10 November 1945	Aston Villa	4–2	Plymouth Argyle
	Martin, Iverson, Edwards

17 November 1945	Aston Villa	3–2	Portsmouth
	Iverson, Edwards, OG

24 November 1945	Portsmouth	2–3	Aston Villa
			Edwards (2), Martin

1 December 1945	Aston Villa	3–1	Nottingham Forest
	Parkes, Smith, Edwards

8 December 1945	Nottingham Forest	1–3	Aston Villa
			Martin, Edwards (2)

19 December 1945	Aston Villa	5–2	Newport County
	Graham, Broome (2), Parkes, Edwards

22 December 1945	Newport County	0–4	Aston Villa
			Iverson, Martin, Smith, Edwards,

25 December 1945	Wolverhampton Wanderers	1–2	Aston Villa
			Iverson (2), Edwards

26 December 1945	Aston Villa	1–1	Wolverhampton Wanderers
	Martin

29 December 1945	Aston Villa	2–2	West Ham United
	Martin, Iverson
