= Keith Jones (Welsh footballer) =

Welsh footballer

Personal information
- Full name: Keith Jones
- Date of birth: 23 October 1928
- Place of birth: Nantyglo, Wales
- Date of death: 25 August 2007 (aged 78)
- Place of death: Redditch, England
- Position: Goalkeeper

Youth career
- Stourport Swifts
- West Bromwich Albion
- Kidderminster Harriers

Senior career*
Years	Team	Apps	(Gls)
1946–1957	Aston Villa	185	(0)
1957–1959	Port Vale	64	(0)
1959–1960	Crewe Alexandra	46	(0)
Total		295	(0)

International career
1949	Wales	1	(0)
- * Club domestic league appearances and goals

Keith Jones (23 October 1928 – 25 August 2007) was a Welsh international footballer. A goalkeeper, he made 295 league appearances in a 13-year career in the Football League and won one cap for Wales in 1949.

He spent May 1946 to July 1957 at Aston Villa and made 199 appearances in all competitions, though he was usually the club's second-choice goalkeeper. He was sold to Port Vale for £3,500 and helped the "Valiants" to win the Fourth Division title in 1958–59. He moved on to Crewe Alexandra in April 1959 before leaving the club the following year.

== Club career ==
Jones played for Stourport Swifts, West Bromwich Albion, and Kidderminster Harriers, before signing with Aston Villa in May 1946. As Joe Rutherford's understudy, he did not feature in 1946–47, but made 19 appearances in 1947–48, as the "Villans" posted a sixth-place finish in the First Division. He played 13 games in 1948–49 and ten games in 1949–50 as Villa finished 10th and 12th in manager Alex Massie's last seasons in charge. Jones remained the club's back-up goalkeeper under new boss George Martin, playing 15, 11 and 20 matches respectively, as Villa finished 15th in 1950–51, sixth in 1951–52, and 11th in 1952–53. New boss Eric Houghton then made Jones the club's regular custodian, as he featured 34, 41 and 35 times respectively as Villa finished 13th in 1953–54, sixth in 1954–55 and 20th in 1955–56. However, he played just the one game in 1956–57 as Villa finished tenth. Nigel Sims was the goalkeeper in the 1957 FA Cup final victory over Manchester United. In eleven years at Villa Park, Jones played 185 league and 14 FA Cup games.

He was sold to Port Vale in July 1957 for £3,500. He went straight into the first-team, ahead of back-up 'keeper John Poole, and made 46 appearances in 1957–58, the last ever season of Third Division South football. However, by December 1958 he had lost his place in the team to Ken Hancock, and was transferred to nearby Crewe Alexandra in April 1959. Norman Low's "Valiants" went on to finish as champions of the newly created Fourth Division in 1958–59. Harry Ware's "Railwaymen" struggled near the football of the Football League in 1958–59 and 1959–60. After that point, Jones departed Gresty Road.

== International career ==
Jones received his sole Wales cap on 9 November 1949, in a 2–0 defeat to Scotland at Hampden Park.

== Career statistics ==
Appearances and goals by club, season and competition
Club	Season	League			FA Cup		Total	
Club	Season	Division	Apps	Goals	Apps	Goals	Apps	Goals
Aston Villa	1947–48	First Division	18	0	1	0	19	0
Aston Villa	1948–49	First Division	13	0	0	0	13	0
Aston Villa	1949–50	First Division	10	0	0	0	10	0
Aston Villa	1950–51	First Division	13	0	2	0	15	0
Aston Villa	1951–52	First Division	11	0	0	0	11	0
Aston Villa	1952–53	First Division	20	0	0	0	20	0
Aston Villa	1953–54	First Division	33	0	1	0	34	0
Aston Villa	1954–55	First Division	34	0	7	0	41	0
Aston Villa	1955–56	First Division	32	0	3	0	35	0
Aston Villa	1956–57	First Division	1	0	0	0	1	0
Aston Villa	Total		185	0	14	0	199	0
Port Vale	1957–58	Third Division South	43	0	3	0	46	0
Port Vale	1958–59	Fourth Division	21	0	1	0	22	0
Port Vale	Total		64	0	4	0	68	0
Crewe Alexandra	1958–59	Fourth Division	4	0	0	0	4	0
Crewe Alexandra	1959–60	Fourth Division	42	0	4	0	46	0
Crewe Alexandra	Total		46	0	4	0	50	0
Career total			295	0	22	0	317	0

== Honours ==
Port Vale

- Football League Fourth Division: 1958–59
