= 1947–48 Aston Villa F.C. season =

English football club season

Aston Villa
1947–48 season
- Chairman: Fred Normansell
- Manager: Alex Massie
- First Division: 6th
- FA Cup: Third round

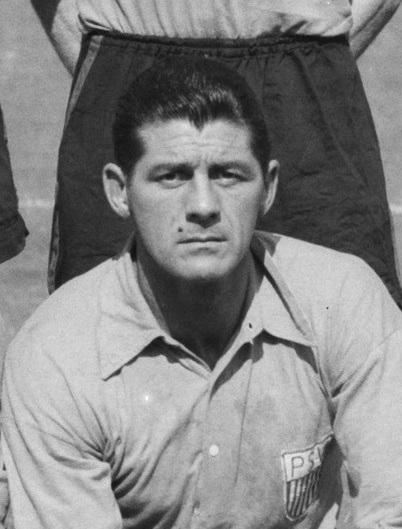
Trevor Ford, top scorer 1947–48 1948–49 and 1949–50

The 1947–48 English football season was Aston Villa's 49th season in The Football League, Villa played the 1947–48 English football season in the Football League First Division, the top-tier of English football.

There were debut appearances for Keith Jones (185), Albert J Brown (30), Albert Vinall (11) and Harry Chapman (6). "Sailor" Brown arrived from Forest in October 1947 for a fee of £10,000, After making 30 appearances and scoring nine goals, he was appointed as Gorleston player-manager in August 1948. In later life Brown did scouting for Villa.

A brace by Trevor Ford (120) gave Villa a 2–0 victory over Brentford at Griffin Park. It would be the 2023–24 season before Villa would record their next win away to Brentford.

== Table ==
Pos	Team	Pld	W	D	L	GF	GA	GAv	Pts
4	Derby County	42	19	12	11	77	57	1.351	50
5	Wolverhampton Wanderers	42	19	9	14	83	70	1.186	47
6	Aston Villa	42	19	9	14	65	57	1.140	47
7	Preston North End	42	20	7	15	67	68	0.985	47
8	Portsmouth	42	19	7	16	68	50	1.360	45

Source: World Football
Rules for classification: 1) Points; 2) Goal average; 3) Goals scored

=== Matches ===
23 August 1947	Grimsby	3–0	Aston Villa	Blundell Park
		Report

27 August 1947	Sunderland	0–0	Aston Villa
		Report

30 August 1947	Aston Villa	1–1	Manchester City	Villa Park
	Dicky Dorsett, 78	Report

1 September 1947	Aston Villa	2–0	Sunderland	Villa Park
	Billy Goffin, 21; Trevor Ford, 83	Report

6 September 1947	Blackburn	0–0	Aston Villa
		Report

8 September 1947	Aston Villa	3–0	Everton	Villa Park
	George Edwards, 22; Trevor Ford, 40; Johnny Dixon, 59	Report

13 September 1947	Aston Villa	0–1	Blackpool	Villa Park
		Report

17 September 1947	Everton	3–0	Aston Villa
		Report

20 September 1947	Derby County	1–3	Aston Villa
		Report	George Edwards, 5; Trevor Ford, 21; Eddie Lowe, 45

27 September 1947	Aston Villa	2–1	Huddersfield	Villa Park
	Trevor Ford, 32; Johnny Dixon, 82	Report

4 October 1947	Chelsea	4–2	Aston Villa
		Report	Johnny Dixon, 30; Trevor Ford, 56

11 October 1947	Arsenal	1–0	Aston Villa
		Report

18 October 1947	Aston Villa	2–0	Sheffield United	Villa Park
	Trevor Ford, 7, 69	Report

25 October 1947	Manchester United	2–0	Aston Villa
		Report

1 November 1947	Aston Villa	4–1	Preston	Villa Park
	Albert J Brown, 16; Jackie Martin, 27, 69; Dicky Dorsett, 70	Report

8 November 1947	Portsmouth	2–4	Aston Villa
		Report	Albert J Brown, 38, 54; Trevor Ford, 44, 88

15 November 1947	Aston Villa	3–1	Bolton	Villa Park
	Les Smith, 4; George Edwards, 59, 85	Report

22 November 1947	Stoke	1–2	Aston Villa
		Report	Albert J Brown, 12; Billy Goffin, 21

29 November 1947	Aston Villa	2–2	Burnley	Villa Park
	Jackie Martin, 73; Frank Moss, 82	Report

6 December 1947	Liverpool	3–3	Aston Villa
		Report	Trevor Ford, 31; Jackie Martin, 32; Albert J Brown, 67

13 December 1947	Aston Villa	1–1	Middlesbrough	Villa Park
	Les Smith, 66	Report

20 December 1947	Aston Villa	2–2	Grimsby	Villa Park
	Albert J Brown, 80; Dicky Dorsett, 89	Report

26 December 1947	Aston Villa	1–2	Wolves	Villa Park
	George Edwards, 53	Report

27 December 1947	Wolves	4–1	Aston Villa
		Report	Les Smith, 52

3 January 1948	Manchester City	0–2	Aston Villa
		Report	Dicky Dorsett, 25; Johnny Dixon, 75

31 January 1948	Blackpool	1–0	Aston Villa
		Report

14 February 1948	Huddersfield	0–1	Aston Villa
		Report	Trevor Ford, 17

21 February 1948	Aston Villa	3–0	Chelsea	Villa Park
	Les Smith, 40; George Edwards, 50; Trevor Ford, 59	Report

28 February 1948	Aston Villa	4–2	Arsenal	Villa Park
	Trevor Ford, 6; Trevor Ford; Les Smith, 71; Johnny Dixon, 88	Report

6 March 1948	Sheffield United	3–1	Aston Villa
		Report	Dicky Dorsett, 90

20 March 1948	Preston	3–0	Aston Villa
		Report

22 March 1948	Aston Villa	0–1	Manchester United	Villa Park
		Report

26 March 1948	Charlton	1–1	Aston Villa
		Report	Albert J Brown, 12

27 March 1948	Aston Villa	2–1	Portsmouth	Villa Park
	Albert J Brown, 17; George Edwards, 32	Report

30 March 1948	Aston Villa	2–1	Charlton	Villa Park
	(Own Goal), 5'; Les Smith, 50	Report

3 April 1948	Bolton	1–0	Aston Villa
		Report

7 April 1948	Aston Villa	2–2	Derby County	Villa Park
	Albert Vinall, 30; George Edwards, 75	Report

10 April 1948	Aston Villa	1–0	Stoke	Villa Park
	Les Smith, 49	Report

14 April 1948	Aston Villa	3–2	Blackburn	Villa Park
	George Edwards, 20; Les Smith; Billy Goffin	Report

17 April 1948	Burnley	1–0	Aston Villa
		Report

24 April 1948	Aston Villa	2–1	Liverpool	Villa Park
	Trevor Ford, 50; Trevor Ford	Report

1 May 1948	Middlesbrough	1–3	Aston Villa
		Report	Trevor Ford, 6, 36; Billy Goffin, 47

Source: avfchistory.co.uk

== FA Cup ==
Third round

The 44 First and Second Division clubs entered the competition at this stage, along with Rotherham United, Queens Park Rangers and Swansea Town.

The matches were scheduled for Saturday, 10 January 1948. Two matches were drawn and went to replays on the following Saturday.

Tie no	Home team	Score	Away team	Date
9	Aston Villa	4–6	Manchester United	10 January 1948

== See also ==
- List of Aston Villa F.C. records and statistics
