= 1940–41 Aston Villa F.C. season =

Aston Villa
1940–41 season
- President: Patrick Hannon
- Chairman: Fred Normansell
- Manager: None
- Stadium: Villa Park
- First Division: suspended
- FA Cup: suspended

The 1940–41 English football season was Aston Villa's second Wartime Football Season.

Villa Park found itself in an evacuation district designated under the British Government's civilian evacuation scheme. In 1939 the Police Chief Constable of Birmingham, C.C.H Moriarty, intimated that he would not sanction football matches within the city of Birmingham. The matter was first raised in Parliament in November 1939, but the Home Secretary was unwilling to intervene in what he perceived as a local issue outside his jurisdiction.

The Football League's Scheme for War-time football, second year aimed to minimise interruption to the job of winning the war. Aston Villa announced their intention not to participate citing the commandeering of Villa Park for the War effort. The grandstand seats were loaned to the ARP for use in air-raid shelters.

December 1940	Nazi Germany	0–27	Aston Villa	Poznań
		Report		Stadium: Stalag XXID
Note: In December 1940, the story went viral that players of the Aston Villa reserves had been captured at Dunkirk and had thrashed their German captors in a football match. TIME Magazine issued an apology for, when reporting the match, erroneously placing Aston in the city of Liverpool. There was indeed an "Aston Villa" football team at Stalag XXID and two former-Villa fringe players James Allen and George Hardy may possibly have played as British POWs. Villa Chairman Fred Normansell was unable to confirm the story and suggested an imaginative American London correspondent as the source. In Villa's last pre-war reserve team match in 1939 they played Derby Reserves at home (Carey in goal, Houghton, Moss, Barker, Goffin, Shell, Osborne, Godfrey, Guttridge, L.J. Latham, J. Bate). That September 1939 the club closed down and the players were paid-off.

== Birmingham and District League ==
In June 1941 the directors report highlighted the club's youth policy: With a view to the future, a team was entered into the Birmingham and District League, and the promise shown by a number of young players including amateurs has been encouraging.
