= Harry Parkes (footballer, born 1920) =

English footballer

Personal information
- Full name: Henry Arthur Parkes
- Date of birth: 4 January 1920
- Place of birth: Birmingham, England
- Date of death: 4 March 2009 (aged 89)
- Place of death: Solihull, England
- Position: Full-back

Youth career
- –1939: Boldmere St. Michaels
- 1939: Aston Villa

Senior career*
| Years | Team | Apps | (Gls) |
| 1939–1955 | Aston Villa | 320 | (7) |
- * Club domestic league appearances and goals

Harry Parkes (4 January 1920 – 4 March 2009) was an English footballer of the 1940s and 1950s. Parkes was a one club man having only played for Aston Villa. He is widely regarded as one of Aston Villa's most popular players of all time. Together with midfielder Frank Moss, the pair were known as the Dolly Sisters by the dressing room. Parkes played in several positions including centre-forward, right-half, and winger, but he played his best football at full-back.

== Early life ==
Parkes was born in Erdington, Birmingham on 4 January 1920.

== Football career ==
Parkes joined Aston Villa in April 1939 as an amateur from Sutton Coldfield club Boldmere St. Michaels. He turned professional in August 1939.

Parkes' career was interrupted by the outbreak of World War II. On 4th September 1939 the Government announced a ban on sport to prevent crowds gathering. Villa's League match away to Wolves was one of over thirty mid-week League fixtures called-off. Villa Park found itself in an evacuation district designated under the British Government's civilian evacuation scheme. The Police Chief Constable of Birmingham, C.C.H Moriarty, intimated that he would not sanction football matches within the city of Birmingham. The Football League's Scheme for War-time football proposed to limit gates to 8,000 in evacuation areas. With their large overheads, the directors of Aston Villa and Sunderland announced their intention to close down. The manager and players were paid off whilst Villa Park was commandeered by the War Office.

The 26-year-old Parkes made his senior debut on 5 January 1946 in a 2-1 loss away to Coventry City. He was in line for an England call-up in 1946, but an injury meant he could not play, and he never got another chance to play for his country.

The 1950–51 season saw perhaps the most remarkable of Villa's several late-season Great Escapes since World War II. By 10 March, following a defeat against Arsenal, Villa found themselves second from bottom with 20 points from 31 games. They seemed doomed to be relegated to the Second Division. Following a defeat to Middlesbrough on 24 March, keeper Joe Rutherford recalled the mood in the dressing room was the gloomiest that he could recall. However midfielder Frank Moss later reminisced that humour played an important part in keeping spirits up and with a man like Harry Parkes around we could literally laugh off so much of our troubles. Villa played their last nine games without defeat, eventually finishing six spots above the relegation zone occupied by Sheffield Wednesday and Everton.

He appeared for the club 345 times scoring 4 goals; plus another 144 wartime games. He missed only 12 League games in seven seasons from 1947 to 1954. He also sat on Aston Villa's board of directors in the 1970s. His only honour with Villa was winning the League War Cup in 1944.

== Post-football career ==
He retired from playing football in 1955 to concentrate on his sports shop in Corporation Street, Birmingham. At one time it supplied all the boots to the Villa team. The shop closed when Parkes retired in the mid-1990s.

Harry died surrounded by his family members at his home in Solihull on 4 March 2009. Parkes was survived by his wife Marjorie and daughter Valerie and son Derek
