= 1951–52 Aston Villa F.C. season =

English football club season

Aston Villa
1951–52 season
- Manager: George Martin
- First Division: 6th
- FA Cup: Third round

The 1951–52 English football season was Aston Villa's 53rd season in The Football League. Villa played in the First Division, the top-tier of English football

There were debuts for Ken Roberts (38) and Graham Cordell (5). From 1953 to 1958 Welsh winger, Roberts added 38 league outings and three goals to his tally.

Con Martin started the 1951–52 season as a left-back, but after goalkeeper Joe Rutherford was injured and the club was caught without cover he took over duties between the posts. He made 26 league appearances and 1 FA Cup appearance as a goalkeeper for Villa before reverting to the centre-half position.

== Table ==
Pos	Team	Pld	W	D	L	GF	GA	GAv	Pts
4	Portsmouth	42	20	8	14	68	58	1.172	48
5	Bolton Wanderers	42	19	10	13	65	61	1.066	48
6	Aston Villa	42	19	9	14	79	70	1.129	47
7	Preston North End	42	17	12	13	74	54	1.370	46
8	Newcastle United	42	18	9	15	98	73	1.342	45

Source: World Football
Rules for classification: 1) Points; 2) Goal average; 3) Goals scored

=== Matches ===
18 August 1951	Bolton Wanderers	5–2	Aston Villa	Burnden Park
		Report	Tommy Thompson 20'; Herbert Smith 26'

25 August 1951	Aston Villa	4–1	Derby County	Villa Park
	Johnny Dixon 26', 42'; Les Smith 31'; Davy Walsh 74'

27 August 1951	Aston Villa	2–1	Sunderland	Villa Park
	Derek Pace 8'; Johnny Dixon 27'

1 September 1951	Manchester City	2–2	Aston Villa	Maine Road
			Derek Pace 17'; Les Smith 44'

5 September 1951	Sunderland	1–3	Aston Villa	Roker Park
			Johnny Dixon 21'; Own Goal 25', 55'

8 September 1951	Aston Villa	1–0	Arsenal	Villa Park
	Tommy Thompson 28'

10 September 1951	Aston Villa	1–0	Huddersfield Town	Villa Park
	Billy Goffin 90'

15 September 1951	Blackpool	0–3	Aston Villa	Bloomfield Road
			Johnny Dixon 51', 88'; Tommy Thompson 71'

19 September 1951	Huddersfield Town	3–1	Aston Villa	Leeds Road
			Amos Moss 77'

22 September 1951	Aston Villa	2–0	Liverpool	Villa Park
	Tommy Thompson 30'; Billy Goffin 42'

29 September 1951	Portsmouth	2–0	Aston Villa	Fratton Park

6 October 1951	Stoke City	4–1	Aston Villa	Victoria Ground
			Johnny Dixon 50'

13 October 1951	Aston Villa	2–5	Manchester United	Villa Park
	Billy Goffin 4'; Herbert Smith 44'

20 October 1951	Tottenham Hotspur	2–0	Aston Villa	White Hart Lane

27 October 1951	Aston Villa	3–2	Preston North End	Villa Park
	Les Smith 20'; Johnny Dixon 30'; Colin Gibson 58'

3 November 1951	Burnley	2–1	Aston Villa	Turf Moor
			Tommy Thompson 63'

10 November 1951	Aston Villa	0–2	Charlton Athletic	Villa Park

17 November 1951	Fulham	2–2	Aston Villa	Craven Cottage
			Stan Lynn 4'; Johnny Dixon 5'

24 November 1951	Aston Villa	2–0	Middlesbrough	Villa Park
	Johnny Dixon 18', 66'

1 December 1951	West Bromwich Albion	1–2	Aston Villa	The Hawthorns
			Colin Gibson 15', 49'

8 December 1951	Aston Villa	2–2	Newcastle United	Villa Park
	Tommy Thompson 3'; Johnny Dixon 42'

15 December 1951	Aston Villa	1–1	Bolton Wanderers	Villa Park
	Billy Goffin 77'

22 December 1951	Derby County	1–1	Aston Villa	Baseball Ground
			Tommy Thompson 6'

25 December 1951	Aston Villa	3–3	Wolverhampton Wanderers	Villa Park
	Davy Walsh 9'; Johnny Dixon 15'; Billy Goffin 75'

26 December 1951	Wolverhampton Wanderers	1–2	Aston Villa	Molineux
			Herbert Smith 3'; Tommy Thompson 38'

29 December 1951	Aston Villa	1–2	Manchester City	Villa Park
	Johnny Dixon 42'

5 January 1952	Arsenal	2–1	Aston Villa	Highbury
			Johnny Dixon 8'

19 January 1952	Aston Villa	4–0	Blackpool	Villa Park
	Tommy Thompson 32', 46'; Johnny Dixon 68'; Davy Walsh 72'

26 January 1952	Liverpool	1–2	Aston Villa	Anfield
			Johnny Dixon 35'; Colin Gibson 40'

9 February 1952	Aston Villa	2–0	Portsmouth	Villa Park
	Davy Walsh 46'; Johnny Dixon 50'

16 February 1952	Aston Villa	2–3	Stoke City	Villa Park
	Own Goal 44'; Davy Walsh 89'

1 March 1952	Manchester United	1–1	Aston Villa	Old Trafford
			Johnny Dixon 28'

8 March 1952	Aston Villa	0–3	Tottenham Hotspur	Villa Park

15 March 1952	Preston North End	2–2	Aston Villa	Deepdale
			Tommy Thompson 42'; Johnny Dixon 74'

22 March 1952	Aston Villa	4–1	Burnley	Villa Park
	Johnny Dixon 6'; Ken Roberts 32'; Davy Walsh 66'; Tommy Thompson 89'

5 April 1952	Aston Villa	4–1	Fulham	Villa Park
	Johnny Dixon 2'; Billy Goffin 22'; Tommy Thompson 65'; Davy Walsh 70'

12 April 1952	Middlesbrough	2–0	Aston Villa	Ayresome Park

14 April 1952	Chelsea	2–2	Aston Villa	Stamford Bridge
			Dicky Dorsett 25'; Johnny Dixon 30'

15 April 1952	Aston Villa	7–1	Chelsea	Villa Park
	Colin Gibson 25', 35'; Johnny Dixon 29'; Billy Goffin 66', 70', 89'; Davy Walsh 83'

19 April 1952	Aston Villa	2–0	West Bromwich Albion	Villa Park
	Johnny Dixon 9', 61'

24 April 1952	Aston Villa	1–0	Charlton Athletic	Villa Park
	Herbert Smith 89'

26 April 1952	Newcastle United	6–1	Aston Villa	St James' Park
			Billy Goffin 65'

Source: avfchistory.co.uk
