= Amos Moss =

English footballer

Personal information
- Full name: Amos Moss
- Date of birth: 28 August 1921
- Place of birth: Birmingham, England
- Date of death: 8 April 2004 (aged 82)
- Place of death: Aldridge, England
- Position: Left half

Youth career
- –1937: Birmingham Boys' Club

Senior career*
Years	Team	Apps	(Gls)
1937–1956	Aston Villa	103	(5)
- Kettering Town
- Wisbech Town
- Kidderminster Harriers
- Rugby Town

Managerial career
- Kidderminster Harriers
- * Club domestic league appearances and goals

Amos Moss (28 August 1921 – 8 April 2004) was an English professional footballer who made over 100 appearances as a left half in the Football League for Aston Villa.

== Personal life ==
Moss' father Frank Sr. and brother Frank Jr. were both professional footballers. He attended Burlington Street School in Aston and served in the British Armed Forces during the Second World War. After retiring from football, Moss ran a newsagents in Great Barr and later worked as a salesman until his retirement in 1991. He continued to work in a newsagents, owned by retired footballer Bobby Hope, until late 2003.

== Career statistics ==
Appearances and goals by club, season and competition
Club	Season	League			FA Cup		Total	
Club	Season	Division	Apps	Goals	Apps	Goals	Apps	Goals
Aston Villa	1946–47	First Division	8	0	0	0	8	0
Aston Villa	1948–49	First Division	1	0	0	0	1	0
Aston Villa	1949–50	First Division	2	0	0	0	2	0
Aston Villa	1950–51	First Division	9	0	2	0	11	0
Aston Villa	1951–52	First Division	11	1	0	0	11	1
Aston Villa	1952–53	First Division	12	3	0	0	12	3
Aston Villa	1953–54	First Division	21	0	1	0	22	0
Aston Villa	1954–55	First Division	17	0	4	0	21	0
Aston Villa	1955–56	First Division	20	1	0	0	20	1
Career total			103	5	7	0	110	5

== Honours ==
Kettering Town

- Southern League: 1956–57
