= 1949–50 Aston Villa F.C. season =

English football club season

Aston Villa
1949-50 season
- Manager: Alex Massie
- First Division: 12th
- FA Cup: Third round

Second City Derby
- 23--14--18

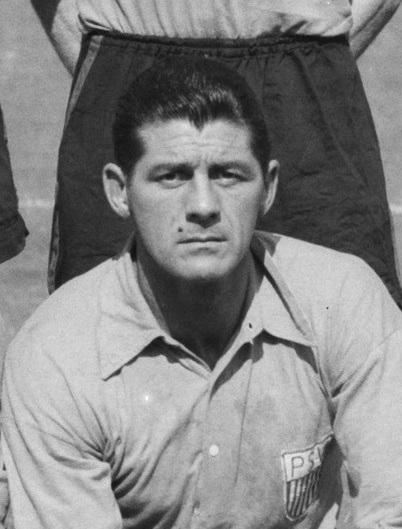
Trevor Ford, top scorer 1947–48 1948-49 and 1949-50

The 1949–50 English football season was Aston Villa's 51st season in The Football League. Villa played in the First Division, the top-tier of English football.

Both matches in the Second City Derby were drawn, 1–1 at home, 2–2 away.

Alex Massie leaves Villa. He had led them to top ten finishes in his first three seasons and twelfth place the following year.

There were debuts for Jimmy Harrison (8) and Pat Daly (3).

== Table ==
Pos	Team	Pld	W	D	L	GF	GA	GAv	Pts
10	Burnley	42	16	13	13	40	40	1.000	45
11	Derby County	42	17	10	15	69	61	1.131	44
12	Aston Villa	42	15	12	15	61	61	1.000	42
13	Chelsea	42	12	16	14	58	65	0.892	40
14	West Bromwich Albion	42	14	12	16	47	53	0.887	40

Source: World Football
Rules for classification: 1) Points; 2) Goal average; 3) Goals scored

=== Matches ===
20 August 1949	Manchester City	3–3	Aston Villa	Maine Road
			Les Smith (26'); Billy Goffin (56', 86')

23 August 1949	Aston Villa	1–1	Derby County	Villa Park
	Trevor Ford (29')

27 August 1949	Aston Villa	3–1	Fulham	Villa Park
	Les Smith (1'); Billy Goffin (39'); Trevor Ford (52')

31 August 1949	Derby County	3–2	Aston Villa	Baseball Ground
			Trevor Ford (5'); Billy Goffin (70')

3 September 1949	Newcastle United	3–2	Aston Villa	St James' Park
			Eddie Lowe (3'); Trevor Ford (52')

5 September 1949	Aston Villa	1–0	Portsmouth	Villa Park
	Ivor Powell (56')

10 September 1949	Aston Villa	0–0	Blackpool	Villa Park

17 September 1949	Middlesbrough	0–2	Aston Villa	Ayresome Park
			Billy Goffin (7', 70')

24 September 1949	Aston Villa	2–2	Everton	Villa Park
	Billy Goffin (17'); Trevor Ford (89')

1 October 1949	Huddersfield Town	1–0	Aston Villa	Leeds Road

8 October 1949	West Bromwich Albion	1–1	Aston Villa	The Hawthorns
			Trevor Ford (52')

15 October 1949	Aston Villa	0–4	Manchester United	Villa Park

22 October 1949	Chelsea	1–3	Aston Villa	Stamford Bridge
			Trevor Ford (12'); Johnny Dixon (15'); Miller Craddock (64')

29 October 1949	Aston Villa	1–1	Stoke City	Villa Park
	Johnny Dixon (54')

5 November 1949	Burnley	1–0	Aston Villa	Turf Moor

12 November 1949	Aston Villa	2–0	Sunderland	Villa Park
	Trevor Ford (20'); Miller Craddock (24')

19 November 1949	Liverpool	2–1	Aston Villa	Anfield
			Johnny Dixon (89')

26 November 1949	Aston Villa	1–1	Arsenal	Villa Park
	Trevor Ford (26')

3 December 1949	Bolton Wanderers	1–1	Aston Villa	Burnden Park
			Jimmy Harrison (87')

10 December 1949	Aston Villa	1–1	Birmingham City	Villa Park
	Trevor Ford (35')

17 December 1949	Aston Villa	1–0	Manchester City	Villa Park
	Frank Moss (90')

24 December 1949	Fulham	3–0	Aston Villa	Craven Cottage

26 December 1949	Wolverhampton Wanderers	2–3	Aston Villa	Molineux
			Ivor Powell (36'); George Edwards (41'); Trevor Ford (75')

27 December 1949	Aston Villa	1–4	Wolverhampton Wanderers	Villa Park
	Johnny Dixon (69')

31 December 1949	Aston Villa	0–1	Newcastle United	Villa Park

14 January 1950	Blackpool	1–0	Aston Villa	Bloomfield Road

21 January 1950	Aston Villa	4–0	Middlesbrough	Villa Park
	Billy Goffin (19', 44'); Trevor Ford (59'); Miller Craddock (70')

4 February 1950	Everton	1–1	Aston Villa	Goodison Park
			Colin Gibson (17')

18 February 1950	Aston Villa	2–1	Huddersfield Town	Villa Park
	Trevor Ford (15', 20')

25 February 1950	Aston Villa	1–0	West Bromwich Albion	Villa Park
	Colin Gibson (87')

8 March 1950	Manchester United	7–0	Aston Villa	Old Trafford

11 March 1950	Aston Villa	2–0	Liverpool	Villa Park
	Billy Goffin (30'); Johnny Dixon (81')

25 March 1950	Aston Villa	0–1	Burnley	Villa Park

29 March 1950	Arsenal	1–3	Aston Villa	Highbury
			Colin Gibson (27'); Johnny Dixon (40', 48')

1 April 1950	Sunderland	2–1	Aston Villa	Roker Park
			George Edwards (78')

7 April 1950	Charlton Athletic	1–4	Aston Villa	The Valley
			Trevor Ford (30'); Con Martin (67' pen); Billy Goffin (71'); Johnny Dixon (87')

8 April 1950	Aston Villa	4–0	Chelsea	Villa Park
	Ivor Powell (45'); Johnny Dixon (48'); Trevor Ford (52'); Billy Goffin (89')

11 April 1950	Aston Villa	1–1	Charlton Athletic	Villa Park
	Les Smith (85')

15 April 1950	Stoke City	1–0	Aston Villa	Victoria Ground

22 April 1950	Aston Villa	3–0	Bolton Wanderers	Villa Park
	Billy Goffin (2'); Johnny Dixon (43', 59')

29 April 1950	Birmingham City	2–2	Aston Villa	St Andrew's
			Trevor Ford (43', 82')

6 May 1950	Portsmouth	5–1	Aston Villa	Fratton Park
			Dicky Dorsett (89' pen)

Source: avfchistory.co.uk

== See also ==
- List of Aston Villa F.C. records and statistics
