= 1948–49 Aston Villa F.C. season =

English football club season

Aston Villa
1948–49 season
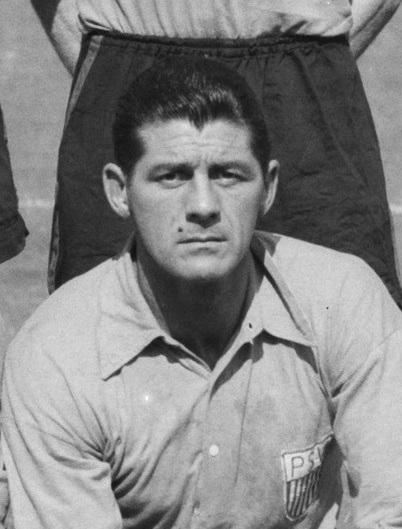
- Top scorer, Trevor Ford (1959)
- Chairman: F.H. Normansell
- Manager: Alex Massie
- First Division: 10th
- FA Cup: Fourth round

Second City Derby
- 23--14--16

The 1948–49 English football season was Aston Villa's 50th season in The Football League. Villa played in the First Division, the top-tier of English football.

At the start of the season The Times had tipped both Villa and Birmingham as Championship contenders. In the Second City derby both teams won their away fixtures.

Villa faced Wolves for the 1948 Christmas fixtures. On Christmas Day they were beaten 4–0 at the Molineux before winning 5–1 at home two days later. Trevor Ford scored four with Syd Howarth adding the fifth.

There were debuts for Con Martin (194), Colin Gibson (158), Ivor Powell (79), Herbert Smith (54), Larry Canning (39), Miller Craddock (34), Jock Mulraney (12), and Syd Howarth (8).

== Table ==
Pos	Team	Pld	W	D	L	GF	GA	GAv	Pts
8	Sunderland	42	13	17	12	49	58	0.845	43
9	Charlton Athletic	42	15	12	15	63	67	0.940	42
10	Aston Villa	42	16	10	16	60	76	0.789	42
11	Stoke City	42	16	9	17	66	68	0.971	41
12	Liverpool	42	13	14	15	53	43	1.233	40

Source: World Football
Rules for classification: 1) Points; 2) Goal average; 3) Goals scored

=== Matches ===
21 August 1948	Aston Villa	2–1	Liverpool	Villa Park
	Trevor Ford (1', 44')	Report

25 August 1948	Bolton Wanderers	3–0	Aston Villa	Burnden Park
		Report

28 August 1948	Blackpool	1–0	Aston Villa	Bloomfield Road
		Report

30 August 1948	Aston Villa	2–4	Bolton Wanderers	Villa Park
	Jackie Martin (13'); John Graham (55')	Report

4 September 1948	Aston Villa	1–1	Derby County	Villa Park
	Dicky Dorsett (56' pen)	Report

8 September 1948	Newcastle United	2–1	Aston Villa	St James' Park
		Report	Johnny Dixon (35')

11 September 1948	Arsenal	3–1	Aston Villa	Highbury
			George Edwards (85')

13 September 1948	Aston Villa	2–4	Newcastle United	Villa Park
	Johnny Dixon (9'); George Edwards (57')

18 September 1948	Aston Villa	3–3	Huddersfield Town	Villa Park
	George Edwards (25'); Albert J Brown (64'); Les Smith (89')

25 September 1948	Manchester United	3–1	Aston Villa	Old Trafford
			George Edwards (3')

2 October 1948	Aston Villa	4–3	Sheffield United	Villa Park
	Trevor Ford (3', 13'); George Edwards (7', 83')

9 October 1948	Aston Villa	1–1	Portsmouth	Villa Park
	Jock Mulraney (72')

16 October 1948	Manchester City	4–1	Aston Villa	Maine Road
			Les Smith (30')

23 October 1948	Aston Villa	4–3	Charlton Athletic	Villa Park
	Jock Mulraney (1'); Dicky Dorsett (38', 82'); George Edwards (70')

30 October 1948	Stoke City	4–2	Aston Villa	Victoria Ground
			Dicky Dorsett (35' pen); George Edwards (2–4)

6 November 1948	Aston Villa	3–1	Burnley	Villa Park
	Dicky Dorsett (24'); Les Smith (56'); Trevor Ford (68')

13 November 1948	Preston North End	0–1	Aston Villa	Deepdale
			George Edwards (15')

20 November 1948	Aston Villa	0–1	Everton	Villa Park

27 November 1948	Chelsea	2–1	Aston Villa	Stamford Bridge
			Les Smith (22')

4 December 1948	Aston Villa	0–3	Birmingham City	Villa Park

11 December 1948	Middlesbrough	6–0	Aston Villa	Ayresome Park

18 December 1948	Liverpool	1–1	Aston Villa	Anfield
			Eddie Lowe (27')

25 December 1948	Wolverhampton Wanderers	4–0	Aston Villa	Molineux

27 December 1948	Aston Villa	5–1	Wolverhampton Wanderers	Villa Park
	Syd Howarth (15'); Trevor Ford (46', 75', 78', 88')

1 January 1949	Aston Villa	2–5	Blackpool	Villa Park
	George Edwards (21'); Billy Goffin (47')

22 January 1949	Aston Villa	1–0	Arsenal	Villa Park
	Billy Goffin (7')

12 February 1949	Huddersfield Town	0–1	Aston Villa	Leeds Road
			Trevor Ford (7')

19 February 1949	Aston Villa	2–1	Manchester United	Villa Park
	Johnny Dixon (49'); Trevor Ford (80')

26 February 1949	Sheffield United	0–1	Aston Villa	Bramall Lane
			Syd Howarth (75')

5 March 1949	Portsmouth	3–0	Aston Villa	Fratton Park

12 March 1949	Aston Villa	1–0	Manchester City	Villa Park
	Billy Goffin (75')

19 March 1949	Everton	1–3	Aston Villa	Goodison Park
			Colin Gibson (44'); Johnny Dixon (52', 65')

26 March 1949	Aston Villa	1–1	Chelsea	Villa Park
	Dicky Dorsett (66' pen)

2 April 1949	Burnley	1–1	Aston Villa	Turf Moor
			Dicky Dorsett (24')

9 April 1949	Aston Villa	2–0	Preston North End	Villa Park
	Les Smith (13'); Trevor Ford (63')

15 April 1949	Sunderland	0–0	Aston Villa	Roker Park

16 April 1949	Charlton Athletic	0–2	Aston Villa	The Valley
			George Edwards (1'); Dicky Dorsett (81')

19 April 1949	Aston Villa	1–1	Sunderland	Villa Park
	Trevor Ford (1')

23 April 1949	Aston Villa	2–1	Stoke City	Villa Park
	George Edwards (5'); Johnny Dixon (46')

27 April 1949	Derby County	2–2	Aston Villa	Baseball Ground
			Johnny Dixon (22'); Dicky Dorsett (51' pen)

30 April 1949	Birmingham City	0–1	Aston Villa	St Andrew's
			Miller Craddock (6')

7 May 1949	Aston Villa	1–1	Middlesbrough	Villa Park
	Dicky Dorsett (80')

Source: avfchistory.co.uk

== See also ==
- List of Aston Villa F.C. records and statistics
