= Syd Howarth =

Welsh footballer

Personal information
- Full name: Sydney Howarth
- Date of birth: 28 June 1923
- Place of birth: Bristol, England
- Date of death: 1 November 2004 (aged 81)
- Place of death: Cardiff, Wales
- Positions: Centre forward; left half

Senior career*
Years	Team	Apps	(Gls)
- Barry Town
- Aberaman Athletic
–1948	Merthyr Tydfil		
1948–1950	Aston Villa	8	(2)
1950–1952	Swansea Town	40	(7)
1952–1953	Walsall	6	(0)
- Merthyr Tydfil
- * Club domestic league appearances and goals

Sydney Howarth (20 June 1923 – 1 November 2004) was an English professional footballer who played as a centre forward in the Football League for Aston Villa, Swansea Town and Walsall. He is probably best remembered for his two spells in non-League football with Merthyr Tyrdfil.

== Club career ==
A centre forward and occasional left half, Tucker began his career with Welsh lower league clubs Barry Town and Aberaman Athletic. He came to prominence as part of Merthyr Tydfil's 1947–48 Southern League-winning squad and transferred to First Division club Aston Villa for a £6500 fee in June 1948. He appeared sparingly in League football for Aston Villa, Swansea Town and Walsall, before returning to Merthyr Tydfil in 1953, with whom he won a second Southern League championship. Tucker was posthumously inducted into the club's Hall of Fame in 2012.

== International career ==
Howarth was picked to represent Wales, but was prevented from being capped by his father, as he had been born in Bristol, England.

== Personal life ==
Tucker was the son of professional footballer Tommy Howarth and was born in Bristol, England. He moved to Newport, Wales with his family 10 after his birth. He joined the Royal Air Force at age 17 served in South Africa, Malta and Palestine during the Second World War. He died in November 2004, after being admitted for treatment on a leg ulcer at University Hospital of Wales, Cardiff.

== Career statistics ==
Appearances and goals by club, season and competition
Club	Season	League			FA Cup		Total	
Club	Season	Division	Apps	Goals	Apps	Goals	Apps	Goals
Aston Villa	1948–49	First Division	7	2	1	0	8	2
Aston Villa	1949–50	First Division	1	0	0	0	1	0
Career total			8	2	1	0	9	2

== Honours ==
Merthyr Tydfil

- Southern League: 1947–48, 1953–54

Individual

- Merthyr Town Hall of Fame
