= Joseph Rutherford =

Joseph Rutherford may refer to:

- Joseph Franklin Rutherford (1869–1942), second president of Watch Tower Society corporation
- Joe Rutherford (1920–1994), English footballer
