= 1952–53 Aston Villa F.C. season =

English football club season

Aston Villa
1952–53 season
- Manager: George Martin
- First Division: 11th
- FA Cup: Sixth round

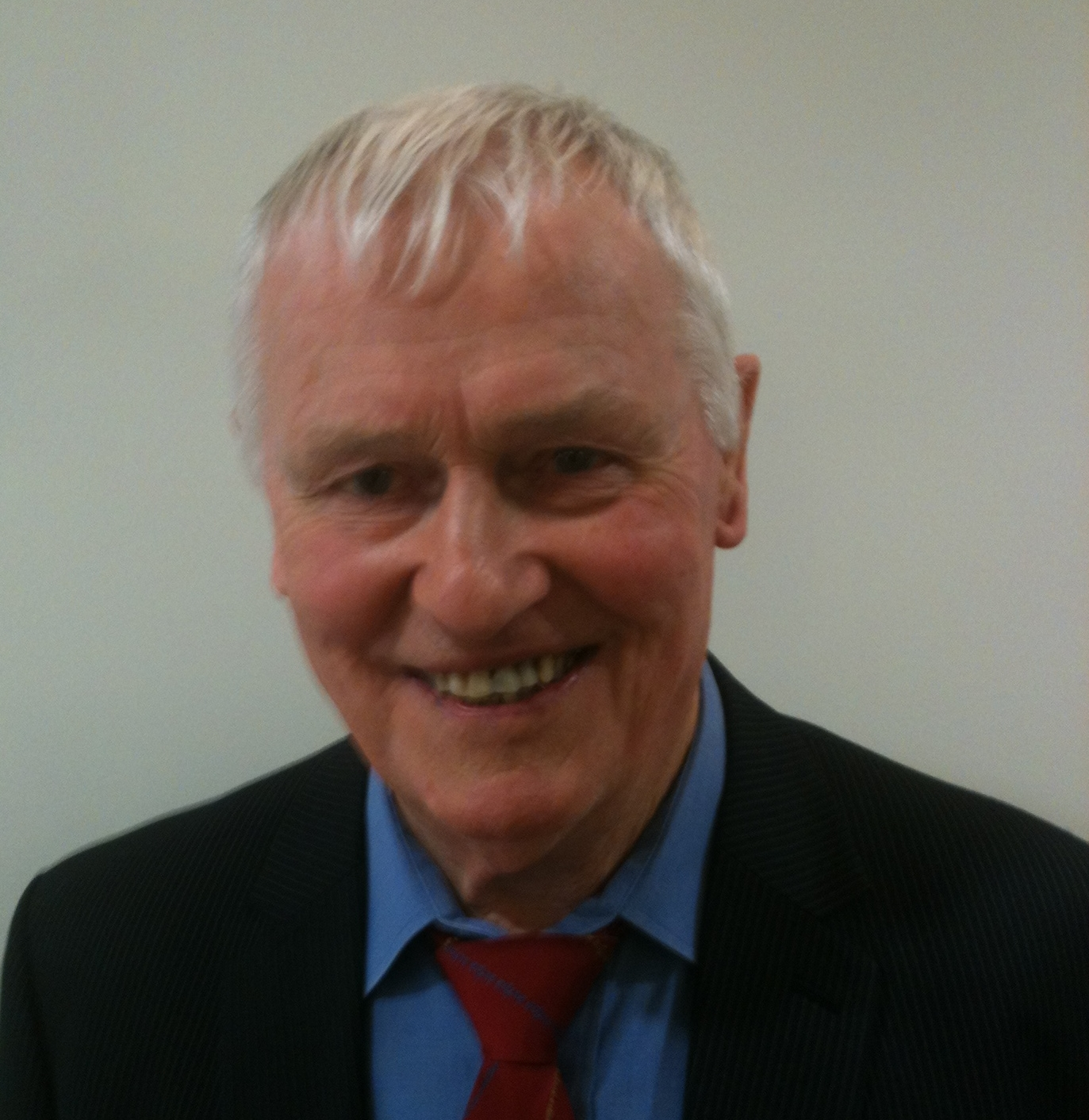
Peter McParland in 2013

The 1952–53 English football season was Aston Villa's 54th season in The Football League. Villa played in the First Division, the top-tier of English football Arsenal finally exceeded Villa's record of six top division titles with their seventh title in 1953.

There were debut appearances for Peter McParland (293), Norman Lockhart (74) and Dennis Parsons (41). During his time with Aston Villa, McParland got influenced by Jimmy Hogan, McParland holds a unique place in English football history as the first player in the game to score in and win both English major domestic knockout Finals.

Manager George Martin resigned over friction with the board.

== Table ==
Pos	Team	Pld	W	D	L	GF	GA	GAv	Pts
9	Sunderland	42	15	13	14	68	82	0.829	43
10	Tottenham Hotspur	42	15	11	16	78	69	1.130	41
11	Aston Villa	42	14	13	15	63	61	1.033	41
12	Cardiff City	42	14	12	16	54	46	1.174	40
13	Middlesbrough	42	14	11	17	70	77	0.909	39

Source: World Football
Rules for classification: 1) Points; 2) Goal average; 3) Goals scored

=== Matches ===
23 August 1952	Aston Villa	1–2	Arsenal	Villa Park
	Davy Walsh

30 August 1952	Derby County	0–1	Aston Villa	Baseball Ground
			Colin Gibson

1 September 1952	Aston Villa	3–0	Sunderland	Villa Park
	Herbert Smith; Peter Aldis; Dixon

6 September 1952	Aston Villa	1–5	Blackpool	Villa Park
	Dixon

8 September 1952	Wolverhampton Wanderers	2–1	Aston Villa	Molineux
			Derek Pace

13 September 1952	Chelsea	4–0	Aston Villa	Stamford Bridge

15 September 1952	Aston Villa	0–1	Wolverhampton Wanderers	Villa Park

20 September 1952	Aston Villa	3–3	Manchester United	Villa Park
	Norman Lockhart; Derek Pace; Ken Roberts

27 September 1952	Portsmouth	1–1	Aston Villa	Fratton Park
			Ken Roberts

4 October 1952	Aston Villa	1–1	Bolton Wanderers	Villa Park
	Amos Moss

11 October 1952	Aston Villa	1–0	Middlesbrough	Villa Park
	Gibson

18 October 1952	Liverpool	0–2	Aston Villa	Anfield
			Own goal; Ken Roberts

25 October 1952	Aston Villa	0–0	Manchester City	Villa Park

1 November 1952	Stoke City	1–4	Aston Villa	Victoria Ground
			Dixon (3); Danny Blanchflower

8 November 1952	Aston Villa	1–0	Preston North End	Villa Park
	Gibson

15 November 1952	Burnley	1–0	Aston Villa	Turf Moor

22 November 1952	Aston Villa	0–3	Tottenham Hotspur	Villa Park

29 November 1952	Sheffield Wednesday	2–2	Aston Villa	Hillsborough
			Stan Lynn; Derek Pace

13 December 1952	Newcastle United	2–1	Aston Villa	St James' Park
			Dixon

20 December 1952	Arsenal	3–1	Aston Villa	Highbury
			Tommy Thompson

26 December 1952	Aston Villa	1–1	Charlton Athletic	Villa Park
	Tommy Thompson

1 January 1953	Sunderland	2–2	Aston Villa	Roker Park
			Dixon; Tommy Thompson

3 January 1953	Aston Villa	3–0	Derby County	Villa Park
	Tommy Thompson; Dixon; Ken Roberts

17 January 1953	Blackpool	1–1	Aston Villa	Bloomfield Road
			Gibson

24 January 1953	Aston Villa	1–1	Chelsea	Villa Park
	Tommy Thompson

18 February 1953	Aston Villa	6–0	Portsmouth	Villa Park
	Own goal; Davy Walsh (2); Dixon; Tommy Thompson; Billy Goffin

21 February 1953	Bolton Wanderers	0–0	Aston Villa	Burnden Park

4 March 1953	Middlesbrough	1–0	Aston Villa	Ayresome Park

7 March 1953	Aston Villa	4–0	Liverpool	Villa Park
	Davy Walsh; Dicky Dorsett; Dixon; Tommy Thompson

14 March 1953	Manchester City	4–1	Aston Villa	Maine Road
			Tommy Thompson

18 March 1953	Charlton Athletic	5–1	Aston Villa	The Valley
			Davy Walsh

25 March 1953	Aston Villa	1–1	Stoke City	Villa Park
	Ken Roberts

28 March 1953	Preston North End	1–3	Aston Villa	Deepdale
			Derek Pace (2); Davy Walsh

4 April 1953	Aston Villa	2–0	Burnley	Villa Park
	Amos Moss; Larry Canning

6 April 1953	West Bromwich Albion	3–2	Aston Villa	The Hawthorns
			Danny Blanchflower; Davy Walsh

7 April 1953	Aston Villa	1–1	West Bromwich Albion	Villa Park
	Davy Walsh

11 April 1953	Tottenham Hotspur	1–1	Aston Villa	White Hart Lane
			Danny Blanchflower

18 April 1953	Aston Villa	4–3	Sheffield Wednesday	Villa Park
	Dixon (2); Gibson; Tommy Thompson

25 April 1953	Cardiff City	1–2	Aston Villa	Ninian Park
			Dixon; Amos Moss

29 April 1953	Aston Villa	2–0	Cardiff City	Villa Park
	Danny Blanchflower; Davy Walsh

1 May 1953	Aston Villa	0–1	Newcastle United	Villa Park

Source: avfchistory.co.uk
