= Peter Aldis =

English footballer

Personal information
- Full name: Basil Peter Aldis
- Date of birth: 11 April 1927
- Place of birth: Kings Heath, England
- Date of death: 17 November 2008 (aged 81)
- Place of death: England
- Position: Defender

Youth career
- –1948: Hay Green
- 1948–1949: Aston Villa

Senior career*
Years	Team	Apps	(Gls)
1949–1960	Aston Villa	262	(1)
1960–????	Hinckley Athletic		
1964–1965	Slavia-Port Melbourne		
1966	Ringwood-Wilhelmina		
1967–1968	U.S.C. Lions		

Managerial career
- 1968–????: Alvechurch
- * Club domestic league appearances and goals

Peter Aldis (11 April 1927 – 17 November 2008) was an English professional footballer who played at full-back and appeared in 294 games for Aston Villa in league and cup.

== Football career ==
He worked for local chocolate firm Cadbury's before joining Aston Villa from local side Hay Green in November 1948. He turned professional the following January.

Aldis scored his only goal of his Aston Villa career in November 1952 against Sunderland, a header from 35 yards, with a world record until 4 October 2009. He was an integral member of Villa's 1957 FA Cup-winning team. Aldis left Villa in 1960 to join Hinckley Athletic.

He moved to Melbourne, Australia in February 1964 to play in the Victorian State League with Slavia-Port Melbourne, winning the Dockerty Cup in his first season with the club. He transferred to Ringwood-Wilhelmina in 1966, where he won the Argus Medal for the best player in the State League, then moved to U.S.C. Lions the following season.

In 1968 he was appointed player-manager of Alvechurch.

== Later life and death ==
In 1990, in his 60s, Aldis finished the London Marathon, raising money for St Richard's Hospital, Chichester.

In his later years, Aldis suffered from dementia, which his wife Grace attributed to heading leather balls during his football career. Aldis died on 17 November 2008.

== Honours ==
Aston Villa

- FA Cup: 1956–57

Slavia-Port Melbourne

- Dockerty Cup: 1964, 1965

Individual

- Argus Medal: 1966
