= Derek Ashton =

English footballer

Personal information
- Full name: Derek Ashton
- Date of birth: 4 July 1922
- Place of birth: Worksop, England
- Date of death: 16 February 1997 (aged 74)
- Place of death: Telford, England
- Position: Defender

Senior career*
Years	Team	Apps	(Gls)
1941–1946	Wolverhampton Wanderers	0	(0)
1946–1951	Aston Villa	8	(0)
- Wellington Town
- * Club domestic league appearances and goals

Derek Ashton (4 July 1922 – 16 February 1997) was an English footballer who played as a defender in the Football League for Aston Villa. He was on the books of Wolverhampton Wanderers without appearing in league football, and played non-league football for Wellington Town.
