= 1939–40 Aston Villa F.C. season =

Aston Villa
1938–39 season
- President: Patrick Hannon
- Chairman: Fred Normansell
- Manager: Jimmy Hogan, dismissed September 1939
- Stadium: Villa Park
- First Division: suspended
- FA Cup: suspended

The 1939–40 English football season was Aston Villa's first Wartime Football Season. Matches were suspended in September after the outbreak of the conflict. The three matches that had been played were expunged from the records.

In August 1939 the Aston Villa footballers played their 20th annual cricket match with Perry Barr. Heavy rain stopped play on the first day but Villa would go on to victory at Church Road, Perry Barr. Jim McConnon and Eric Houghton excelled for Villa. The football season began as normal on 26 August. Following the German invasion of Poland and subsequent declaration of war by Britain against Nazi Germany on 3 September 1939, football matches were halted.

Villa Park found itself in an evacuation district designated under the British Government's civilian evacuation scheme. The Police Chief Constable of Birmingham, C.C.H Moriarty, intimated that he would not sanction football matches within the city of Birmingham. The matter was first raised in Parliament in November 1939, but the Home Secretary was unwilling to intervene in what he perceived as a local issue outside his jurisdiction. The Football League's Scheme for War-time football proposed to limit gates to 15,000 or 8,000 in evacuation areas. With their large overheads, the directors of Aston Villa and Sunderland announced their intention to close down. The manager and players were paid off whilst Villa Park was commandeered by the War Office. The grandstand seats were loaned to the ARP for use in air-raid shelters.

Villa's players quickly found war-time employment. Houghton, Allen, Callaghan, Rutherford, Starling, Moss, Kerr, Barker, C.S. Batty, and Cobley became policemen. Broome, Massie, and Iverson engaged in factory work of national importance. Les Latham joined the Royal Marines participating in the Normandy Landings.

The Villa players had freedom to guest. When Wolves met Northampton in the Midland Regional League, the Northampton team contained six Villa players.

26 August 1939	Middlesbrough	0–2	Aston Villa	Ayresome Park
			Jackie Martin, Edwards
Note: Expunged from the records. A pleasant afternoon, possibly too warm for the players comfort. Freddie Haycock suffered a knee injury and Villa played the second half a man down.

28 August 1939	Aston Villa	1–2	Everton	Villa Park
Note: Expunged from the records.

2 September 1939	Derby County	1–0	Aston Villa	Baseball Ground
				Attendance: 8,000
Note: Expunged from the records. Rutherford (goal), Callaghan, Cummings, Massie, Allen, Iverson, Edwards, Martin, O'Donnell, Starling, Broome. Kerr was unfit and Freddie Haycock was injured requiring a knee operation. The reserve team played Derby Reserves at home: Carey, Godfrey, Guttridge, L.J. Latham, Moss, Barker, Goffin, Osborne, Shell, Bate, Houghton.

6 September 1939	Wolves	v	Aston Villa	Molineux
Note: On 4th September the Government announced a ban on Sport to prevent crowds gathering. This match was one of over thirty mid-week League fixtures called-off.

16 September 1939	Leicester City	3–0	Aston Villa	Filbert Street
Note: After the suspension of competitive football, friendlies were quickly set up between regional teams. A crowd of 3,000-4,000 watched, many in khaki, most carrying their gas masks.

== HMT Aston Villa ==
In January 1940, Chairman Fred Normansell's wife was a member of the Aston & Lozells women's working party when they adopted the Royal Navy minesweeper Aston Villa.

At the outbreak of the Second World War, Sir Geoffrey Cecil Congreve, 1st Baronet was given command of four naval trawlers of the Royal Naval Patrol Service, based at Aberdeen and Scapa Flow, among then being HMT Arab. Congreve took command of the force on 22 January 1940, from HMT Aston Villa. After several months of convoy duties and anti-submarine warfare, Congreve received orders on 25 April to cross the North Sea to the coast of Norway, against the German Operation Weserübung. His 16th Anti-Submarine Group comprised the Angle, Arab, Aston Villa and Gaul.

The trawlers were under William Boyle, 12th Earl of Cork, commanding the fleet of the allied forces attempting to capture Narvik. The Namsenfjorden area in which they were to operate left the vessels exposed to air attack. Both HMT Aston Villa and HMT Gaul were damaged in attacks. Aston Villa was hit by dive-bombers on 30 April, and was damaged to the point of lacking the seaworthiness to make the return crossing of the North Sea. It was scuttled on 3 May in Kroken Bay of Namsenfjorden.
