= Ernie Callaghan =

English footballer

Personal information
- Date of birth: 21 January 1910
- Place of birth: Birmingham, England
- Date of death: 3 May 1972 (aged 62)
- Place of death: Aston, England
- Height: 5 ft 10 in (1.78 m)
- Position: Defender

Youth career
- Atherstone Town

Senior career*
Years	Team	Apps	(Gls)
1930–1947	Aston Villa	125	(0)
- * Club domestic league appearances and goals

Ernie Callaghan BEM (21 January 1910 – 5 May 1972) was an English footballer. He played as a defender for several small clubs before being signed for Aston Villa in 1930. He played for them for 125 league games and in 17 cup matches.

Some of his previous clubs included Hinckley Athletic, Atherstone Town, Cradley Heath, West Bromwich Albion on a trial and Birmingham City on a trial.

Callaghan was a member of the legendary Aston Villa team that refused to perform a Nazi salute on their famous 1938 tour of Germany.

Callaghan's career was interrupted by the outbreak of World War II. In September 1939, he played in Villa's last pre-war game, a 1–0 defeat at Derby County. On 4th September the Government announced a ban on Sport to prevent crowds gathering. Villa's League match away to Wolves was one of over thirty mid-week League fixtures called-off. Villa Park found itself in an evacuation district designated under the British Government's civilian evacuation scheme. The Police Chief Constable of Birmingham, C.C.H Moriarty, intimated that he would not sanction football matches within the city of Birmingham. The Football League's Scheme for War-time football proposed to limit gates to 8,000 in evacuation areas. With their large overheads, the directors of Aston Villa and Sunderland announced their intention to close down. The manager and players were paid off whilst Villa Park was commandeered by the War Office. Villa's players quickly found war-time employment. Callaghan became a constable in Birmingham City Police. On the night of 28 July 1942, he and Police Sergeant Harold Wood attended the factory of Gabriel's Ltd on Coleshill Street in Birmingham which had been bombed. They helped rescue trapped workers and with a civilian James Hughes the three men received gallantry awards. For his part Ernie Callaghan received the British Empire Medal (B.E.M.).

He previously held the Aston Villa club record for the oldest first team player, being 39 years 86 days old when he played against Grimsby Town in 1946. In his last game in April 1947, he was 39 years and 257 days. On 1 February 2011, American goalkeeper Brad Friedel set a new club record by playing a first-team game away at Manchester United ages 39 years and 259 days.
