= Bob Iverson =

English footballer

Personal information
- Full name: Robert Iverson
- Date of birth: 17 October 1910
- Place of birth: Folkestone, England
- Date of death: 19 July 1953 (aged 42)
- Position: Wing half

Senior career*
Years	Team	Apps	(Gls)
1933–1935	Lincoln City	41	(13)
1935–1937	Wolverhampton Wanderers	35	(7)
1937–1948	Aston Villa	135	(9)
Total		211	(29)
- * Club domestic league appearances and goals

Robert Iverson (17 October 1910 – 19 July 1953) was an English professional footballer best known for his time at Aston Villa. Iverson signed for Villa from Wolves.

On 3 December 1938 Iverson scored a goal against Charlton in the first 9.6 seconds of the match, becoming the League record.

Iverson's career was interrupted by the outbreak of World War II. In September 1939, he played in Aston Villa's last pre-war game, a 1–0 defeat at Derby County. On 4th September the Government announced a ban on Sport to prevent crowds gathering. Villa's League match away to Wolves was one of over thirty mid-week League fixtures called-off. Villa Park found itself in an evacuation district designated under the British Government's civilian evacuation scheme. The Police Chief Constable of Birmingham, C.C.H Moriarty, intimated that he would not sanction football matches within the city of Birmingham. The Football League's Scheme for War-time football proposed to limit gates to 8,000 in evacuation areas. With their large overheads, the directors of Aston Villa and Sunderland announced their intention to close down. The manager and players were paid off whilst Villa Park was commandeered by the War Office. Villa's players quickly found war-time employment. Iverson engaged in factory work of national importance.

After his Villa career he retired and became reserve/youth-team coach at Villa Park. He was later first team coach and fourth team coach.
