= Johnny Dixon (footballer) =

English footballer (1923–2009)

Personal information
- Full name: John Thomas Dixon
- Date of birth: 10 December 1923
- Place of birth: Hebburn, England
- Date of death: 20 January 2009 (aged 85)
- Place of death: Sutton Coldfield, England
- Position: Inside forward

Senior career*
Years	Team	Apps	(Gls)
–	Spennymoor United		
1945–1961	Aston Villa	392	(132)
- * Club domestic league appearances and goals

John Thomas Dixon (10 December 1923 – 20 January 2009) was an English footballer who played as an inside forward. He captained Aston Villa's winning team in the 1957 FA Cup final, the last of seven.

Born in Hebburn, Dixon played for county league side Spennymoor United before he signed as a professional for Aston Villa shortly after the Second World War. The 37-year-old scored his final game on 29 Apr 1961 in a 4–1 First Division home victory over Sheffield Wednesday, playing with Charlie Aitken in his first Villa game.

When he retired, Dixon became a youth-team coach with the club. He later became second-team coach. Dixon, manager Dick Taylor and chief scout Jimmy Easson were sacked soon after the 1966-67 season when Aston Villa had been relegated for only the third time in the club's history.

Dixon had Alzheimer's disease, and died on 20 January 2009 in Good Hope Hospital, Sutton Coldfield.

== Career statistics ==
Club performance			League		Cup		Total	
Season	Club	League	Apps	Goals	Apps	Goals	Apps	Goals
England			League		FA Cup		Total	
1946–47	Aston Villa	First Division	17	6	–		17	6
1947–48	Aston Villa	First Division	12	5	–		12	5
1948–49	Aston Villa	First Division	25	7	1	0	26	7
1949–50	Aston Villa	First Division	37	11	3	0	40	11
1950–51	Aston Villa	First Division	34	15	2	1	36	16
1951–52	Aston Villa	First Division	42	26	1	2	43	28
1952–53	Aston Villa	First Division	27	13	5	1	32	14
1953–54	Aston Villa	First Division	39	9	1	0	40	9
1954–55	Aston Villa	First Division	36	13	7	1	43	14
1955–56	Aston Villa	First Division	37	16	3	2	40	18
1956–57	Aston Villa	First Division	39	6	9	5	48	11
1957–58	Aston Villa	First Division	14	2	–		14	2
1958–59	Aston Villa	First Division	28	2	6	0	34	2
1959–60	Aston Villa	Second Division	4	0	–		4	0
1960–61	Aston Villa	First Division	1	1	–		1	1
Career total			392	132	38	12	430	144

== Honours ==
Aston Villa

- FA Cup: 1956–57
