= Jackie Martin (footballer) =

English footballer

Personal information
- Full name: John Rowland Martin
- Date of birth: 5 August 1914
- Place of birth: Hamstead, Birmingham, England
- Date of death: 1996 (aged 81–82)
- Height: 5 ft 10 1/2 in (1.79 m)
- Position: Inside right

Senior career*
| Years | Team | Apps | (Gls) |
| 1934–49 | Aston Villa | 81 | (22) |
- * Club domestic league appearances and goals

John Rowland Martin (5 August 1914 – 1996) was an English footballer who played for Aston Villa.

Martin's career was interrupted by the outbreak of World War II. In September 1939, he played in Aston Villa's last pre-war game, a 1–0 defeat at Derby County. On 4th September the Government announced a ban on Sport to prevent crowds gathering. Villa's League match away to Wolves was one of over thirty mid-week League fixtures called-off. Villa Park found itself in an evacuation district designated under the British Government's civilian evacuation scheme. The Police Chief Constable of Birmingham, C.C.H Moriarty, intimated that he would not sanction football matches within the city of Birmingham. The Football League's Scheme for War-time football proposed to limit gates to 8,000 in evacuation areas. With their large overheads, the directors of Aston Villa and Sunderland announced their intention to close down. The manager and players were paid off whilst Villa Park was commandeered by the War Office. Villa's players quickly found war-time employment.
