= George Cummings (footballer) =

Scottish footballer

Personal information
- Full name: George Wilfred Cummings
- Date of birth: 5 June 1913
- Place of birth: Falkirk, Scotland
- Date of death: 9 April 1987 (aged 73)
- Place of death: Birmingham, England
- Height: 5 ft 11 1/2 in (1.82 m)
- Position: Left back

Youth career
- Thornbridge Waverley
- Thornbridge Welfare

Senior career*
Years	Team	Apps	(Gls)
–	Grange Rovers		
1932–1935	Partick Thistle	114	(1)
1935–1949	Aston Villa	210	(0)
Total		324	(1)

International career
1934–1935	Scottish League XI	2	(0)
1935–1939	Scotland	9	(0)
1944	Scotland (wartime)	1	(0)
- * Club domestic league appearances and goals

George Wilfred Cummings (5 June 1913 – 9 April 1987) was a Scottish footballer of the 1930s and 1940s, who played as a left back.

== Club career ==
Cummings was the captain of Aston Villa's great post-World War II defence, having signed for the club in November 1935 from Partick Thistle, where he had made a total of 138 appearances in all competitions, scoring one goal, and won a Glasgow Cup medal with the Jags in 1934.

At Villa Park, Cummings gained a Second Division championship medal in 1938.

Cummings's career was interrupted by the outbreak of World War II. In September 1939, he played in Villa's last pre-war game, a 1–0 defeat at Derby County. On 4th September the Government announced a ban on Sport to prevent crowds gathering. Villa's League match away to Wolves was one of over thirty mid-week League fixtures called-off. Villa Park found itself in an evacuation district designated under the British Government's civilian evacuation scheme. The Police Chief Constable of Birmingham, C.C.H Moriarty, intimated that he would not sanction football matches within the city of Birmingham. The Football League's Scheme for War-time football proposed to limit gates to 8,000 in evacuation areas. With their large overheads, the directors of Aston Villa and Sunderland announced their intention to close down. The manager and players were paid off whilst Villa Park was commandeered by the War Office. Villa's players quickly found war-time employment.

Cummings gained a Football League War Cup tankard in 1944, also guesting for several teams (including hometown club Falkirk) during the conflict. He was the Villans' club captain from 1945 to his retirement in 1949, and was popular with supporters due to his never-say-die spirit and no-nonsense defending. He played 421 times for the club in total, including wartime competitions – his peacetime total being just over half of that.

On retirement as a player he was a youth coach at Aston Villa for three years, and also worked for the Dunlop Rubber Company and Hardy Spicer Ltd. in Birmingham.

== International career ==
Cummings represented both Scotland (nine caps, three while at Partick Thistle) and the Scottish League XI (two caps), also playing in an SFA tour of North America in 1935 and in one wartime international in 1944.
