= Sailor Brown =

English footballer (1915–2008)

Personal information
- Full name: Robert Albert John Brown
- Date of birth: 7 November 1915
- Place of birth: Great Yarmouth, England
- Date of death: 27 December 2008 (aged 93)
- Height: 5 ft 8 in (1.73 m)
- Position: Inside forward

Youth career
- Great Yarmouth Town
- Gorleston

Senior career*
Years	Team	Apps	(Gls)
–1934	Gorleston		
1934–1946	Charlton Athletic	47	(21)
1946–1947	Nottingham Forest	45	(17)
1947–1948	Aston Villa	30	(9)
1948	Gorleston		
Total		122	(47)

International career
1945–1946	England war	6	(4)

Managerial career
- 1948–1956: Gorleston
- 1958: Gorleston
- * Club domestic league appearances and goals

Robert Albert John "Sailor" Brown (7 November 1915 – 27 December 2008), also known as Albert Brown or Bert Brown, was an English professional footballer who played as an inside forward. He was given the nickname "Sailor" by teammates due to his "rolling gait and muscularly stocky build".

== Career ==
Brown was born on 7 November 1915 in Great Yarmouth, Norfolk and was educated at St Peter's and Priory School. He played for Great Yarmouth Town and Gorleston as a youth, before making a move to the Football League with Charlton Athletic in August 1934. His debut came against Birmingham City on 29 January 1938 and made 60 appearances and scored 24 goals in all competitions before leaving in January 1940 because of the Second World War. During the war, he served as a sergeant in the Royal Air Force and was a member of the Greenwich auxiliary police. He played for Newcastle United, West Ham United, Millwall, York City, Leicester City, Manchester City, Wolverhampton Wanderers and East Fife as a wartime player,. Brown also featured in six wartime and/or Victory internationals for England, scoring four goals.

Following the war, Brown played for Charlton in the FA Cup Final on 27 April 1946, which was lost 4–1 to Derby County at Wembley Stadium. He joined Nottingham Forest for a fee of £6,750 in May 1946. He made 45 appearances and scored 17 goals for Forest before moving to Aston Villa in October 1947 for a fee of £10,000, then the club's record highest fee paid. After making 30 appearances and scoring nine goals, he was appointed as Gorleston player-manager in August 1948. He left the club in May 1956 to retire from football and worked as a bookmaker and a timber merchant, while also scouting for Villa, although he briefly returned as Gorleston manager in 1958 after Joe Jobling left the club. He lived in Forres, Scotland in his later life and died on 27 December 2008, at the age of 93.

== Honours ==
Charlton Athletic

- FA Cup runner-up: 1945–46
