= Frank Moss (footballer, born 1917) =

English footballer

Personal information
- Date of birth: 16 September 1917
- Place of birth: Aston, England
- Date of death: 1997 (aged 79–80)
- Position: Defender

Senior career*
Years	Team	Apps	(Gls)
- Worcester Nondescripts
- Worcester City
1935	Wolverhampton Wanderers	0	(0)
1936–1937	Sheffield Wednesday	22	(0)
1938–1954	Aston Villa	296	(3)
Total		318	(3)
- * Club domestic league appearances and goals

Frank Moss (16 September 1917 – 1997) was an English professional footballer who is best known for his career with Aston Villa. His playing position was a midfielder. Before playing for Villa, Moss played for Worcester City, Wolverhampton Wanderers and Sheffield Wednesday.

In May 1938, the 20-year-old Wednesday player was signed for £2,000 by Jimmy Hogan, manager of Aston Villa. His father, Frank Moss Senior, to whom he had a striking resemblance, had also played for Villa. Frank Moss Junior made his debut on 5 Sep 1938 in a 0-3 home defeat against Everton.

Moss's career was interrupted by the outbreak of World War II. In September 1939, he played in the Villa Reserves last pre-war game at home to Derby County. On 4th September the Government announced a ban on Sport to prevent crowds gathering. Villa's League match away to Wolves was one of over thirty mid-week League fixtures called-off. Villa Park found itself in an evacuation district designated under the British Government's civilian evacuation scheme. The Police Chief Constable of Birmingham, C.C.H Moriarty, intimated that he would not sanction football matches within the city of Birmingham. The Football League's Scheme for War-time football proposed to limit gates to 8,000 in evacuation areas. With their large overheads, the directors of Aston Villa and Sunderland announced their intention to close down. The manager and players were paid off whilst Villa Park was commandeered by the War Office. Villa's players quickly found war-time employment. Moss became a constable in Birmingham City Police, and later enlisted in the Royal Navy. In 1944–45, he made 15 guest appearances for Southampton.

The 1950–51 season saw perhaps the most remarkable of Villa's several late-season Great Escapes following World War II. By 10 March, following a defeat against Arsenal, Villa found themselves second from bottom with 20 points from 31 games. They seemed doomed to be relegated to the Second Division. Following a defeat to Middlesbrough on 24 March, keeper Joe Rutherford recalled the mood in the dressing room was the gloomiest that he could recall. However midfielder Moss later reminisced that humour played an important part in keeping spirits up and with a man like Harry Parkes around we could literally laugh off so much of our troubles. Villa played their last nine games without defeat, eventually finishing six spots above the relegation zone occupied by Sheffield Wednesday and Everton. Together with Parkes, the pair were known as the Dolly Sisters by the dressing room.

When Moss retired due to injury, he subsequently owned a newsagents in Shady Lane, Great Barr.
