= John Graham (footballer, born 1926) =

English footballer (1926–2006)

Personal information
- Date of birth: 26 April 1926
- Place of birth: Leyland, England
- Date of death: September 2006 (aged 80)
- Place of death: Lancashire, England
- Position: Forward

Youth career
- Leyland Works
- Blackburn Rovers

Senior career*
Years	Team	Apps	(Gls)
1945–1949	Aston Villa	10	(3)
1949–1952	Wrexham	45	(7)
1952–1953	Rochdale	10	(1)
1953–1954	Bradford City	18	(1)
Total		83	(12)
- * Club domestic league appearances and goals

John R. Graham (26 April 1926 – September 2006) was an English professional footballer who played as a forward.

== Career ==
Born in Leyland, Graham played for Leyland Works, Blackburn Rovers, Aston Villa, Wrexham, Rochdale and Bradford City.

For Bradford City he made 18 appearances in the Football League, scoring 1 goal; he also made 2 FA Cup appearances.

== Sources ==
- Frost, Terry (1988). Bradford City A Complete Record 1903-1988. Breedon Books Sport. ISBN 0-907969-38-0.
