= Les Smith (footballer, born 1918) =

English footballer & manager (1918–1995)

Personal information
- Full name: Leslie George Frederick Smith
- Date of birth: 13 March 1918
- Place of birth: Ealing, England
- Date of death: 24 May 1995 (aged 77)
- Place of death: Litchfield, England
- Height: 5 ft 8 in (1.73 m)
- Position: Outside left

Senior career*
Years	Team	Apps	(Gls)
1936–1939	Brentford	62	(7)
1945	Queens Park Rangers (guest)	1	
1946–1952	Aston Villa	181	(31)
1952–1953	Brentford	14	(1)
1953–1954	Kidderminster Harriers		

International career
1939	England	1	(0)
1939–1946	England (wartime)	13	(3)

Managerial career
- 1953–1954: Kidderminster Harriers
- * Club domestic league appearances and goals

Leslie George Frederick Smith (13 March 1918 – 20 May 1995) was an English footballer.

== Football career ==
He was born and educated in Ealing and was a junior with Petersham, before joining Brentford as an amateur on 26 June 1934. Whilst as an amateur he gained experience at both Wimbledon and Hayes F.C. on loan, before turning professional with the Bees in March 1936 as an outside-right. On 24 May 1939, he was capped by England, replacing the injured Stanley Matthews against Romania, to become Brentford's second England international following Billy Scott in 1936.

When the war broke out, Smith played a vital part in the RAF as a rear gunner, where he consequently met his future wife, Joan (who was part of the women's RAF). However Smith still managed to play for Brentford during the war. He also played 13 wartime internationals for England, 11 whilst a Brentford player and 2 once transferred to Aston Villa. He also played in 3 'unofficial International matches', under the guise of an FA XI, but all players played in England shirts, all were English and all received notification on English FA headed paper.

As a consequence of the Second World War, regionalized football returned. Smith guested for Chelsea during the war and won the Football League War Cup (south) with the club at Wembley in 1945.

In October 1945, Smith signed for Aston Villa for a fee of £7,500, where he spent six seasons and became a crowd favourite. In 1952, he returned to Brentford, for a fee of £3,000, where he spent one season before retiring. After his retirement he went into management for a season with Kidderminster Harriers, before becoming a scout for Wolverhampton Wanderers.

== Personal life ==
Smith was the son of Francis Edmond and Ethel-May and he had one sister, Frances (m. Byrne). Smith attended St Dunstan's College in Ealing, where he was a friend of his future Brentford manager Harry Curtis' son Gordon. After leaving Brentford for the second time in 1953, he returned to Aston and ran an electrical business. Smith died of Alzheimer's disease in May 1995.

== Honours ==
=== As a player ===
Brentford

- London War Cup: 1941–42

Chelsea

- Football League War Cup (south): 1945

Individual

- Brentford Hall of Fame
