= 1953–54 Aston Villa F.C. season =

English football club season

Aston Villa
1953–54 season
- Manager: Eric Houghton
- First Division: 13th
- FA Cup: Third round

Aston Villa played the 1953–54 English football season in the Football League First Division, the top-tier of English football.

There were debuts for Bill Baxter (98), Ken O Roberts (38), Roy Chapman (19), and Joe Tyrell (7). When Baxter retired in summer 1957, he stayed with Villa to serve them as coach and assistant manager until 1967. Roberts scored three goals in his time at Villa.

== Table ==
Pos	Team	Pld	W	D	L	GF	GA	GAv	Pts
11	Preston North End	42	19	5	18	87	58	1.500	43
12	Arsenal	42	15	13	14	75	73	1.027	43
13	Aston Villa	42	16	9	17	70	68	1.029	41
14	Portsmouth	42	14	11	17	81	89	0.910	39
15	Newcastle United	42	14	10	18	72	77	0.935	38

Source: World Football
Rules for classification: 1) Points; 2) Goal average; 3) Goals scored

== See also ==
- List of Aston Villa F.C. records and statistics
