= George Edwards (footballer, born 1918) =

English footballer

George Robert Edwards (1 April 1918 – 21 January 1993) was an English professional footballer who is best known for his career with Aston Villa. His playing position was a striker.

Born in Great Yarmouth, Edwards played for Norwich City before signing for Aston Villa.

Edwards' career was interrupted by the outbreak of World War II. In September 1939, he played in Villa's last pre-war game, a 1–0 defeat at Derby County. On 4th September the Government announced a ban on Sport to prevent crowds gathering. Villa's League match away to Wolves was one of over thirty mid-week League fixtures called-off. Villa Park found itself in an evacuation district designated under the British Government's civilian evacuation scheme. The Police Chief Constable of Birmingham, C.C.H Moriarty, intimated that he would not sanction football matches within the city of Birmingham. The Football League's Scheme for War-time football proposed to limit gates to 8,000 in evacuation areas. With their large overheads, the directors of Aston Villa and Sunderland announced their intention to close down. The manager and players were paid off whilst Villa Park was commandeered by the War Office.

Villa's players quickly found war-time employment. Edwards made wartime guest appearances for Birmingham, Chelmsford, Coventry City, Northampton Town, Norwich City, Walsall, Wrexham, Nottingham Forest, Notts County, West Bromwich Albion, Leicester City and Worcester City. Edwards played 122 games for Villa during World War II, scoring 93 goals, and was part of the team that won the Football League War Cup in 1944.

He later moved to Bilston United before retiring from the game.

He stood 5 ft 10 1/2 in (1.79 m) tall.
