= Alex Massie (footballer) =

Scottish footballer (1906–1977)

Personal information
- Full name: Alexander Massie
- Date of birth: 13 March 1906
- Place of birth: Possilpark, Glasgow, Scotland
- Date of death: 20 September 1977 (aged 71)
- Place of death: Hatfield, Hertfordshire, England
- Height: 5 ft 9 1/2 in (1.77 m)
- Position: Right-half

Senior career*
Years	Team	Apps	(Gls)
- Shawfield Juniors
- Petershill
- Benburb
- Ashfield
1925–1927	Ayr United	24	(4)
1927–1928	Bury	17	(4)
1928–1930	Bethlehem Steel	32	(12)
1930	Dolphin		(2)
1930–1935	Heart of Midlothian	181	(19)
1935–1939	Aston Villa	141	(5)

International career
1932–1938	Scotland	18	(1)
1932–1935	Scottish League XI	6	(1)

Managerial career
- 1945–1950: Aston Villa
- 1950–1951: Torquay United
- 1951–1952: Hereford United
- Hertford Town
- 1973–1974: Welwyn Garden City
- * Club domestic league appearances and goals

Alexander Massie (13 March 1906 – 1977) was a Scottish footballer of the 1920s and 1930s, who played mainly as a right-half. He played for various Scottish clubs before joining Bury. After spells in the United States and Ireland, Massie returned to Scottish football in 1930 with Heart of Midlothian. His performances there earned him selection for the Scotland national football team and the Scottish League XI. Massie moved to Aston Villa in 1935. After retiring as a player in 1945, Massie became the manager of Aston Villa. He later managed Torquay United and Hereford United.

== Playing career ==
Massie was born in Possilpark, Glasgow, to William Spiers Massie, a weighing clerk, and Violet Shaw Massie. He began his career with Shawfield Juniors, and later played for Petershill, Benburb, Ashfield, and Ayr United before joining Football League side Bury in January 1927.

In 1928, he left Gigg Lane to play in the United States for Bethlehem Steel, supporting himself as a bookkeeper, and in 1930 he joined Irish side Dolphin. Later that year he returned to his native Scotland to join Heart of Midlothian. His performances at wing-half, and occasionally at inside-forward soon won him international recognition, with his first full Scotland international cap coming on 19 September 1931 against Ireland. Massie went on to be capped 18 times for Scotland, with his final game coming on 30 October 1937 against Wales, which was also the occasion of his only international goal. He also played in an unofficial 'King's Silver Jubilee' international in 1935 and represented the Scottish League XI.

Massie moved to Aston Villa in December 1935, but was unable to prevent their first ever relegation at the end of the 1935–36 season. He was still with the Villans when they gained promotion back to the top division two years later.

In the summer of 1938 Villa toured Nazi Germany. The day before their first match, the England football team bowed to pressure from the British Foreign Office and performed the Nazi salute during a friendly match on 14 May 1938. The atmosphere at Villa's first match against a German Select XI was in marked contrast with continual jeering and whistling. Villa's use of the offside trap was unfamiliar and frustrating to the German players and fans. When Massie fouled Camillo Jerusalem, the referee needed to separate the teams. Hostility from the 110,000 crowd intensified when the Villa players left the pitch without the required Nazi salute and Joseph Goebbels was called to suppress subsequent hostile German press coverage.

Massie's career was interrupted by the outbreak of World War II. In September 1939, he played in Villa's last pre-war game, a 1–0 defeat at Derby County. On 4th September the Government announced a ban on Sport to prevent crowds gathering. Villa's League match away to Wolves was one of over thirty mid-week League fixtures called-off. Villa Park found itself in an evacuation district designated under the British Government's civilian evacuation scheme. The Police Chief Constable of Birmingham, C.C.H Moriarty, intimated that he would not sanction football matches within the city of Birmingham. The Football League's Scheme for War-time football proposed to limit gates to 8,000 in evacuation areas. With their large overheads, the directors of Aston Villa and Sunderland announced their intention to close down. The manager and players were paid off whilst Villa Park was commandeered by the War Office. Villa's players quickly found war-time employment. Massie engaged in factory work of national importance.

== Managerial career ==
Massie retired from playing at end of the 1944–45 wartime season; he was appointed manager of Aston Villa in August 1945 and led them to top ten finishes in his first three seasons and twelfth place the following year, despite not having complete control of the playing side of things at Villa Park. However, in August 1950 he left the club.

In 1950 he was appointed as manager of Torquay United as successor to Bob John, although he only remained as manager until 1951.

He returned to management with Hereford United the following January, where he remained as manager until December 1952. He later managed Hertford Town and Welwyn Garden City the later in which he won the South Midlands League Premier Division in 1972–73.

== Honours ==
Aston Villa

- Football League Second Division: 1937–38

Welwyn Garden City

- South Midlands League Premier Division: 1972–73

== See also ==
- List of Scotland national football team captains
