= Joe Rutherford =

English footballer

Personal information
- Date of birth: 20 September 1914
- Place of birth: Fatfield, England
- Date of death: 27 December 1994 (aged 80)
- Place of death: Sutton Coldfield, England
- Position: Goalkeeper

Senior career*
Years	Team	Apps	(Gls)
- Birtley Colliery
1936–1939	Southport	88	(0)
1939–1952	Aston Villa	148	(0)
Total		236	(0)
- * Club domestic league appearances and goals

Joe Rutherford (20 September 1920 – 27 December 1994) was a footballer who played as a goalkeeper in the Football League for Southport and Aston Villa.

Born in Fatfield, County Durham, Rutherford played as a youth for Chester-le-Street Schools, Chester-le-Street Juniors, Fatfield Juniors, Chester Moor Temperance, Ferryhill, Blyth Spartans and Chester-le-Street, and had trials at West Ham United and Reading, before joining Birtley Colliery. He joined Southport in October 1936.

Rutherford joined Aston Villa in February 1939. Rutherford's career was interrupted by the outbreak of World War II. In September 1939, he played in Villa's last pre-war game, a 1–0 defeat at Derby County. On 4th September the Government announced a ban on Sport to prevent crowds gathering. Villa's League match away to Wolves was one of over thirty mid-week League fixtures called-off. Villa Park found itself in an evacuation district designated under the British Government's civilian evacuation scheme. The Police Chief Constable of Birmingham, C.C.H Moriarty, intimated that he would not sanction football matches within the city of Birmingham. The Football League's Scheme for War-time football proposed to limit gates to 8,000 in evacuation areas. With their large overheads, the directors of Aston Villa and Sunderland announced their intention to close down. The manager and players were paid off whilst Villa Park was commandeered by the War Office. Villa's players quickly found war-time employment. Rutherford became a policeman. During the Second World War, he played in several games as a guest, for Margate, playing one game in 1939–40, Solihull Town, Nottingham Forest, Lincoln City and Mansfield Town, but these are not counted in official league records and tallies.

Rutherford played in 156 league and cup matches for Villa, retiring in 1951. After football he owned a transport company. His lorry fleet included operations out of Weeford Quarry near Sutton Coldfield.
