= Colin Gibson (footballer, born 1923) =

English footballer

Personal information
- Full name: Colin Haywood Gibson
- Date of birth: 16 September 1923
- Place of birth: Normanby, England
- Date of death: 22 March 1992 (aged 68)
- Place of death: Wordsley, England
- Height: 5 ft 11 in (1.80 m)
- Positions: Outside right; inside right

Youth career
- –: Penarth Pontoons

Senior career*
Years	Team	Apps	(Gls)
194?–1948	Cardiff City	71	(16)
1948–1949	Newcastle United	23	(5)
1949–1956	Aston Villa	158	(24)
1956–1957	Lincoln City	36	(12)
1957–1958	Stourbridge		
- * Club domestic league appearances and goals

Colin Haywood Gibson (16 September 1923 – 22 March 1992 (Note: Many sources incorrectly give 27 March, the date that his death was first reported, as his death date.)) was an English footballer who scored 57 goals from 288 appearances in the Football League playing for Cardiff City, Newcastle United, Aston Villa and Lincoln City. He played as an outside right or inside right.

== Life and career ==
Colin Haywood Gibson was born in Normanby, near Middlesbrough in Yorkshire, on 16 September 1923. His father moved to south Wales to work in the docks, and Gibson was spotted by Cardiff City playing football for a local team in Penarth. He assisted Cardiff City to the Third Division South title in 1946–47, before joining Newcastle United, newly promoted to the First Division, in the 1948 close season for a £15,000 fee. Despite rarely missing a game, Gibson was one of eleven players "considered redundant" in January 1949, and despite interest from Arsenal, whose manager Tom Whittaker said that "Arsenal are always on the look-out for real footballers like Gibson", he signed for Aston Villa for £17,500.

He played for Villa for seven years, during which time he was capped for the Football League representative team against the League of Ireland XI in May 1949 in a 5–0 win. and received his first recognition for England, at "B" international level, a few days later against the Netherlands A team, in a 4–0 win. He signed for Lincoln City of the Second Division for a £6,000 fee in 1956, and a year later moved into non-league football with Stourbridge, where he ended his career.

After his football career, Gibson remained in the Stourbridge area where he was the landlord of several pubs. He died in Wordsley Hospital on 22 March 1992 at the age of 68 after a short illness.
