= Fred Normansell =

Aston Villa F.C. chaiman

Frederick Henry Normansell was a wholesale fish merchant and chaiman of Aston Villa for 20 years

Fred Normansell died aged 68 in 1955. He was interred in the family grave at Lodge Hill Cemetery.
