= Dicky Dorsett =

English footballer

Personal information
- Full name: Richard Dorsett
- Date of birth: 3 December 1919
- Place of birth: Brownhills, England
- Date of death: November 1999 (age 79)
- Place of death: Brownhills, England
- Position: Centre-forward

Youth career
- 1935–1936: Wolverhampton Wanderers

Senior career*
Years	Team	Apps	(Gls)
1936–1946	Wolverhampton Wanderers	46	(32)
1946–1953	Aston Villa	257	(32)
- * Club domestic league appearances and goals

Richard Dorsett (3 December 1919 – November 1999) was an English footballer, who played as a striker. Dorsett was sometimes known as "the Brownhills Bomber" after his birthplace of Brownhills, Staffordshire (now West Midlands).

== Football career ==
Dorsett started his career with Wolverhampton Wanderers, making his debut in 1938. During that season he scored their only goal in the 4–1 defeat by Portsmouth in the 1939 FA Cup Final.

During World War II, Dorsett served with the RAF and guested for Brentford, Grimsby Town, Liverpool, Queens Park Rangers and Southampton, for whom he made 16 appearances, scoring 23 goals. He was a member of the Wolves side that won the 1942 Football League War Cup and played 58 wartime games, scoring 40 goals.

In September 1946, he joined Aston Villa for £3,000. His career almost came to an end in 1950 when he was involved in a car crash, but he recovered and played another three seasons before retiring from the game in 1953.

== Later career ==
He stayed at Aston Villa coaching the club's youth team before joining Liverpool in 1957 as assistant trainer, a job he held until 1962.

He died in November 1999, a month before what would have been his 80th birthday.

== Honours ==
Wolverhampton Wanderers

- FA Cup runner-up: 1938–39
