= Billy Goffin =

English footballer (1920–1987)

Personal information
- Full name: William Charles Goffin
- Date of birth: 12 December 1920
- Place of birth: Amington, England
- Date of death: 15 September 1987 (aged 66)
- Place of death: Tamworth, England
- Position: Striker

Youth career
- Amington Village

Senior career*
Years	Team	Apps	(Gls)
1936–1937	Tamworth		
1937–1954	Aston Villa	156	(36)
1954–1955	Walsall	8	(1)
1955–1961	Tamworth		
Total		164	(37)

Managerial career
- 1955–1958: Tamworth
- * Club domestic league appearances and goals

William Charles Goffin (12 December 1920 – 15 September 1987) was an English professional footballer who played in the Football League for Aston Villa and Walsall. He was often referred to by his nickname "Cowboy".

Having previously played locally for Amington Village, Goffin played briefly for Tamworth before moving to Aston Villa as an amateur in August 1937. He signed professional forms with the club in December 1937.

His career was interrupted by World War II. In September 1939, he played in the Villa Reserves last pre-war game at home to Derby County. On 4th September the Government announced a ban on Sport to prevent crowds gathering. Villa's League match away to Wolves was one of over thirty mid-week League fixtures called-off. Villa Park found itself in an evacuation district designated under the British Government's civilian evacuation scheme. The Police Chief Constable of Birmingham, C.C.H Moriarty, intimated that he would not sanction football matches within the city of Birmingham. The Football League's Scheme for War-time football proposed to limit gates to 8,000 in evacuation areas. With their large overheads, the directors of Aston Villa and Sunderland announced their intention to close down. The manager and players were paid off whilst Villa Park was commandeered by the War Office.

During World War II, Goffin made 82 appearances for Villa, scoring 47 goals, and also guested for Tamworth, Birmingham, Leicester City, Nottingham Forest and Swansea Town. In 1952, he scored four goals in a 19–2 win against RAF Lichfield in the Birmingham & District League. He remained at Villa until his transfer to Walsall in August 1954. In all, he made 255 first team appearances for Villa, scoring 89 goals. Of these, 156 appearances and 39 goals came in the Football League. He played for Walsall for one season, making eight League appearances.

In 1955, Goffin became the first manager of Tamworth – the club had previously been run by committee – when he rejoined the club as player-manager. While at the club, he combined his role with a job as a collector for the East Midlands Electricity Board. In February 1958, Goffin resigned as manager and was replaced by Vernon Chapman. The 40-year-old continued playing until the end of the 1960–61 season. He was awarded a testimonial in May 1961.

== Managerial statistics ==
Team	Nat	From	To	Record							
Team	Nat	From	To	P	W	D	L	GF	GA	GD	W%
Tamworth	(England)	1955	3 February 1958	109	61	16	32	273	165	+108	56.0
Total				109	61	16	32	273	165	+108	56.0

== Bibliography ==
- Clayton, Dave (2011). Warrillow, Martin (ed.). We are Tamworth: From the Lamb (PDF). Tamworth FC Supporters Club Heritage Project.
