= Cecil Moriarty =

Irish rugby union player (1877–1958)

- Born: Cecil Charles Hudson Moriarty; 28 January 1877 Tralee, County Kerry, Ireland
- Died: 7 April 1958 (aged 81) Tenbury, Worcestershire, England

Rugby union career
- Position: Forward
Senior career
Years	Team	Apps	(Points)
- Monkstown
International career
Years	Team	Apps	(Points)
1899	Ireland	1	

Cecil Charles Hudson Moriarty, CBE, CStJ (1877–1958) was an Irish-born British police officer and Irish rugby international. He won one cap against Wales in 1899. He served as Chief Constable of the Birmingham City Police from 1935 to 1941, and his manuals and books on police procedures became essential guidebooks for police in the United Kingdom.

== Early life ==
Born on 28 January 1877 in Tralee, County Kerry, Moriarty was the second son of the Rev. Thomas Alexander Moriarty, Church of Ireland rector of Millstreet, County Cork. Moriarty graduated from Trinity College, Dublin in 1898, the year before his cap for the Irish rugby union team.

== Career ==
Moriarty joined the Royal Irish Constabulary, becoming a first-class district inspector in 1902. In 1912, he joined RIC headquarters. The same year, he graduated with a Bachelor of Laws. In 1918, he moved to Birmingham to take on the role of assistant chief constable. Many Irish constables had been recruited to move to Birmingham by Sir Charles Rafter, Chief Constable of Birmingham from 1899 to 1935, who relied on the Irish to help stamp out the infamous Peaky Blinders gang.

The British police strikes in 1918 and 1919 led to the Police Act 1919, which made it illegal for police officers in the UK to strike. Moriarty realised more professionalism was required among police recruits and officers, and subsequently "became the key figure in organising an intensive training curriculum" in Birmingham. The programme gained a national reputation for police training, and over the next two decades, officers from 77 police forces from England and Wales had trained in Birmingham.

Moriarty wrote several books and papers on police procedures, notably Moriarty's Police Law (1929), which for more than half a century was a fundamental resource for law enforcement officials in the UK. In 1932, he received an additional degree of Doctor of Laws.

Moriarty succeeded Rafter as Chief Constable of Birmingham in 1935. When war broke out, the city's football stadiums, St Andrew's and Villa Park found themselves in evacuation districts designated under the British Government's civilian evacuation scheme. The Police Chief Constable of Birmingham intimated that he would not sanction football matches within the city of Birmingham. The matter was first raised in Parliament in November 1939, but the Home Secretary was unwilling to intervene in what he perceived as a local issue outside his jurisdiction.

Moriarty retired in 1941, having led the city through two years of the Blitz.

== Recognition ==
He was made an Officer of the Order of the British Empire (OBE) in the 1925 Birthday Honours. In 1936, he was made a Commander of the Venerable Order of Saint John (CStJ) and in the 1938 New Year Honours, a Commander of the Order of the British Empire (CBE).

== Personal life ==
Moriarty married Muriel Una (née Carter) of Belmullet, County Mayo, in 1906. They had three daughters. He died in 1958 in Worcestershire.

== Publications ==
- Moriarty's Police Law (originally Police law: an arrangement of law and regulations for the use of police officers) (1929)
- Police Procedure and Administration (1930)
- Questions and Answers on Police Duties (1935)
- Further Questions and Answers on Police Duties (1938)
- Moriarty's Questions and Answers on Police Subjects (1954)
