= 1938–39 Aston Villa F.C. season =

English football club season

Aston Villa
1938–39 season
- President: Patrick Hannon
- Manager: Jimmy Hogan
- Stadium: Villa Park
- First Division: 12th
- FA Cup: Fourth round

Second City Derby
- 22--13--16

The 1938–39 English football season was Aston Villa's 47th season in The Football League, Villa playing in the Football League First Division having won promotion in the previous season.

There were debuts for Frank Moss, George Edwards, Frank O'Donnell, Alan Wakeman and goalkeeper Joe Rutherford.

The outbreak of World War II meant that 1939-40 season was abandoned and the three matches that had been played expunged from the records. The manager and players were paid off whilst Villa Park was commandeered by the War Office.

== First Division ==
Pos	Team	Pld	W	D	L	GF	GA	GAv	Pts
10	Grimsby Town	42	16	11	15	61	69	0.884	43
11	Liverpool	42	14	14	14	62	63	0.984	42
12	Aston Villa	42	16	9	17	71	60	1.183	41
13	Leeds United	42	16	9	17	59	67	0.881	41
14	Manchester United	42	11	16	15	57	65	0.877	38

Source: World Football
Rules for classification: 1) Points; 2) Goal average; 3) Goals scored

Matches

27 August 1938	Grimsby Town	1–2	Aston Villa	Blundell Park
		Report	Frank Broome, 8, 63
Note: The 1938–39 season began bittersweet for Frank Broome when he tore a ligament in his right ankle in the match against Grimsby.

31 August 1938	Middlesbrough	1–1	Aston Villa	Ayresome Park
		Report	Eric Houghton, 68, pen.

3 September 1938	Aston Villa	0–1	Derby County	Villa Park
		Report

5 September 1938	Aston Villa	0–3	Everton	Villa Park
		Report

10 September 1938	Blackpool	2–4	Aston Villa	Bloomfield Road
		Report	Freddie Haycock, 36; Ronnie Starling, 39; Jackie Martin, 50, 75

17 September 1938	Aston Villa	5–0	Brentford	Villa Park
	Jackie Martin, 2; Andy Kerr; Eric Houghton, pen.	Report
Note: Villa secured their first home win with a 5–0 win over Brentford which The Times described as impressive as it was decisive. The 1938–39 season began badly for Frank Broome when he tore a ligament in his right ankle in the match against Grimsby. He returned in September despite not fully recovered in a 5–0 home win against Brentford.

24 September 1938	Arsenal	0–0	Aston Villa	Highbury
		Report

1 October 1938	Aston Villa	2–0	Portsmouth	Villa Park
	Andy Kerr; Ronnie Starling	Report

8 October 1938	Huddersfield Town	1–1	Aston Villa	Leeds Road
		Report	Frank Broome, 67

15 October 1938	Liverpool	3–0	Aston Villa	Anfield
		Report

22 October 1938	Aston Villa	1–2	Leicester City	Villa Park
	Freddie Haycock, 83	Report

29 October 1938	Birmingham City	3–0	Aston Villa	St Andrew's
		Report
Note: In the Second City derby Villa were beaten three-nil away but won 5–2 at Villa Park.

5 November 1938	Aston Villa	0–2	Manchester United	Villa Park
		Report

12 November 1938	Stoke City	3–1	Aston Villa	Victoria Ground
		Report	Own Goal, 28

19 November 1938	Aston Villa	6–2	Chelsea	Villa Park
	Frank Broome; Freddie Haycock; Frank O’Donnell; Eric Houghton	Report

26 November 1938	Preston North End	3–2	Aston Villa	Deepdale
		Report	Freddie Haycock; Frank Broome

3 December 1938	Aston Villa	2–0	Charlton Athletic	Villa Park
	Bob Iverson; Frank O’Donnell	Report
Note: On 3 December 1938,Bob Iverson scored a goal against Charlton in the first 9.6 seconds of the match, becoming the League record.

10 December 1938	Bolton Wanderers	1–2	Aston Villa	Burnden Park
		Report	Eric Houghton; Frank Broome

17 December 1938	Aston Villa	2–1	Leeds United	Villa Park
	Frank O’Donnell; Eric Houghton, pen.	Report

24 December 1938	Aston Villa	0–2	Grimsby Town	Villa Park
		Report

26 December 1938	Sunderland	1–5	Aston Villa	Roker Park
		Report	Frank O’Donnell; Freddie Haycock; Frank Broome; Eric Houghton

27 December 1938	Aston Villa	1–1	Sunderland	Villa Park
	Frank Broome, 72	Report

31 December 1938	Derby County	2–1	Aston Villa	Baseball Ground
	Ronnie Dix, Dai Astley	Report	Eric Houghton, 59
Note: Goals by former-players Dix and Astley vanquish Villa in a match they did not deserve to lose. Derby remain top. Villa are in 11th with 22 points. Houghton's goal takes him to eight, third behind O'Donnell (11) and Broome (9).

14 January 1939	Aston Villa	3–1	Blackpool	Villa Park
	Eric Houghton, 2; Freddie Haycock	Report

28 January 1939	Aston Villa	1–3	Arsenal	Villa Park
	Frank O’Donnell, 51	Report

4 February 1939	Portsmouth	0–0	Aston Villa	Fratton Park
		Report

8 February 1939	Brentford	2–4	Aston Villa	Griffin Park
		Report	Frank Broome; Frank O’Donnell; Freddie Haycock

15 February 1939	Aston Villa	4–0	Huddersfield Town	Villa Park
	Frank Broome; Frank O’Donnell, 2; Jackie Martin	Report

18 February 1939	Aston Villa	2–0	Liverpool	Villa Park
	Frank Broome, 2	Report

25 February 1939	Leicester City	1–1	Aston Villa	Filbert Street
		Report	Frank O’Donnell, 45

4 March 1939	Aston Villa	5–1	Birmingham City	Villa Park
	Jackie Martin 17, 71, 74 Eric Houghton 24, 82	Report
Note: In the Second City derby Villa were beaten three-nil away but won 5–2 at Villa Park.

11 March 1939	Manchester United	1–1	Aston Villa	Old Trafford
		Report	Frank Broome, 71

18 March 1939	Aston Villa	3–0	Stoke City	Villa Park
	Frank Broome; Frank O’Donnell; Eric Houghto	Report

25 March 1939	Chelsea	2–1	Aston Villa	Stamford Bridge
		Report	Freddie Haycock, 56

1 April 1939	Aston Villa	3–0	Preston North End	Villa Park
	Jackie Martin; Frank O’Donnell, 2	Report

8 April 1939	Charlton Athletic	1–0	Aston Villa	The Valley
		Report

10 April 1939	Wolverhampton Wanderers	2–1	Aston Villa	Molineux
		Report	Frank O’Donnell, 17

11 April 1939	Aston Villa	2–2	Wolverhampton Wanderers	Villa Park
	Bob Iverson, 43; Ronnie Starling, 68	Report

15 April 1939	Aston Villa	1–3	Bolton Wanderers	Villa Park
	Ronnie Starling, 83	Report

22 April 1939	Leeds United	2–0	Aston Villa	Elland Road
		Report

29 April 1939	Everton	3–0	Aston Villa	Goodison Park
		Report

6 May 1939	Aston Villa	1–1	Middlesbrough	Villa Park
	Freddie Haycock, 48	Report

Source: avfchistory.co.uk

== FA Cup ==
The 44 First and Second Division clubs entered the competition at the Third Round stage along with Barnsley, York City and Notts County. The matches were scheduled for Saturday, 7 January 1939, although seven matches began at later dates. Eight matches were drawn and went to replays, with one of these requiring a second replay to settle the fixture.

Tie no	Home team	Score	Away team	Date
9	Aston Villa	1–1	Ipswich Town	7 January 1939
Replay	Ipswich Town	1–2	Aston Villa	11 January 1939

Fourth round

The matches were scheduled for Saturday, 21 January 1939. Five games were drawn and went to replays, of which two went to a second replay. Chelmsford City was the last non-league club remaining in the competition, participating in their ninth round of this tournament.

Tie no	Home team	Score	Away team	Date	Notes
3	Preston North End	2–0	Aston Villa	21 January 1939	"An undeserved defeat at Preston".

== Charity Cup ==
In May 1939, Aston Villa played Coventry City for the Lord Mayor's Cup winning 1-0 in front of 5000 spectators.

== Friendlies ==
In the summer of 1938 Villa toured Nazi Germany. The day before their first match, the England football team bowed to pressure from the British Foreign Office and performed the Nazi salute during a friendly match on 14 May 1938. Despite this diplomatic protocol the Birmingham Gazette reported the performance of Villa's Frank Broome beside headline, “GESTAPO”, in which it detailed the surveillance of 20,000 Germans in England by the German Secret Police.

The atmosphere in the Villa's first match against a German Select XI was in marked contrast to the England game with continual jeering and whistling. Villa's use of the offside trap was unfamiliar and frustrating to the German players and fans. When future Villa manager, Alex Massie fouled Camillo Jerusalem, the referee needed to separate the teams. Hostility from the 110,000 crowd intensified when the Villa players left the pitch without the required Nazi salute and Joseph Goebbels was called to suppress subsequent hostile German press coverage.

The second game, in Düsseldorf, passed without incident but, following the third match, in Stuttgart, SS guards and Stormtroopers were needed to protect the players from the crowd. During the war TIME Magazine would report that the Villa reserve team, all captured at Dunkirk, thrashed their captor SS guards.

The pre-season Jubilee Fund matches saw Villa pitched against local rivals West Bromwich Albion. The derby match ended in a 1–1 draw with Frank Broome scoring for Aston Villa and Harry Jones grabbing one for the Baggies.

== Youth & Reserves ==
Under coach Frank Barson, Villa secured the Birmingham Combination and were runners-up in the Midland Mid-Week League and won the Worcestershire Senior Cup. In January 1939, Aston Villa "A" beat Kidderminster Harriers to reach the semi-finals.
