= 1949–50 Notts County F.C. season =

Notts County
1949–50 season
- Chairman: C.G. Barnes
- Manager: Eric Houghton
- Third Division South: 1st
- FA Cup: Third Round
- Top goalscorer: League: Tommy Lawton (31); All: Tommy Lawton (33)
- Highest home attendance: 46,000 vs Nottingham Forest (22 April 1950)
- Lowest home attendance: 27,076 vs Aldershot (28 January 1950)
Home colours

During the 1949–50 English football season, Notts County competed in the Third Division South, the third tier of the English football league system. It was the 86th season in Notts County's history and their 51st as members of the Football League. The team was captained by the centre forward Tommy Lawton, an England international who had signed for the club in 1947. Notts lost their second game of the season, but they were in first place by 10 September, a position they did not relinquish thereafter. The team went 18 League and Cup matches unbeaten, a run that culminated in a 2–1 away win against Nottingham Forest in the season's first Nottingham derby, a match remembered for Lawton's powerful headed goal.

The unbeaten run came to an end in the following match and injuries began to affect the team. By the end of January, its lead at the top of the Third Division South had been reduced from five points to one. The return of players to the team coincided with an upturn in form and, although they then won only one of their first five matches of April, Notts County secured the championship and promotion to the Second Division with a 2–0 home win over Forest on 22 April. Notts entered the FA Cup in the first round and won two matches before being eliminated in the third round by First Division side Burnley.

Managed by Eric Houghton, Notts County played 45 matches, winning 27, drawing eight and losing ten. Two players, Harry Adamson and Roy Smith, played in every game, while Lawton was the top scorer with 33 goals. The season was the highpoint of the "Lawton Era", a notable period in Notts County's history where large crowds came to watch Lawton and his teammates. An average of 35,176 people attended the club's 21 home League games, while a new Meadow Lane attendance record of 46,000 saw Notts County's title-clinching win in the Nottingham derby; the former remains the club record, and the latter remains Notts County's largest home League attendance.

== Background ==
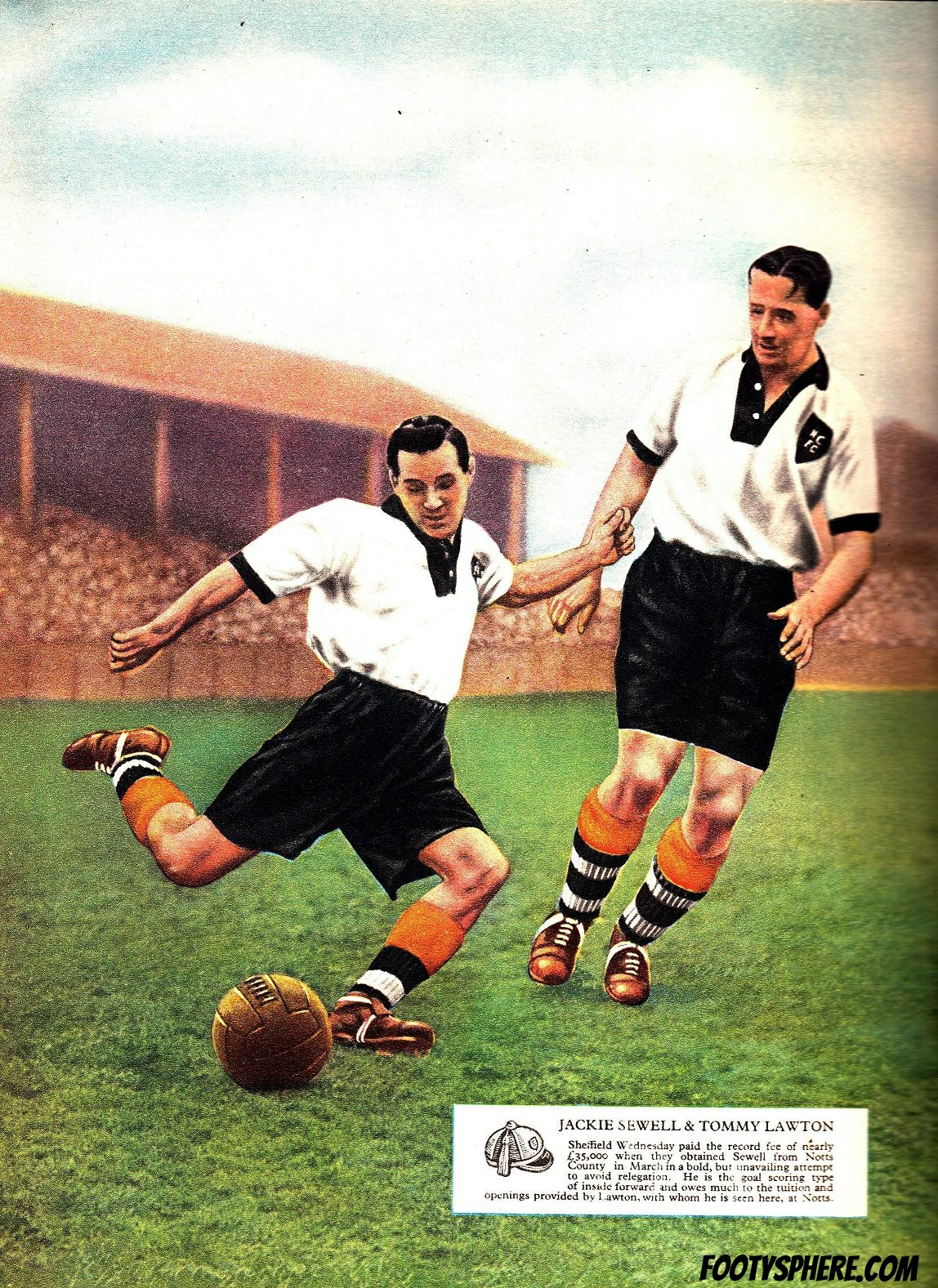
Jackie Sewell (left) and Tommy Lawton

In November 1947, Notts County (nicknamed the Magpies) broke the British transfer fee record when they paid Chelsea £20,000 for the centre forward Tommy Lawton. The move of Lawton, an England international regarded as one of the best players of his day, to a Third Division South club was "one of the sporting shocks of the age". The transfer was the beginning of the "Lawton Era", one of the most notable periods in Notts County's history. In the 1948–49 season, three players, Lawton, Jackie Sewell and Tom Johnston, each scored 20 goals or more, and the team 102 altogether, but nevertheless it finished 11th in the table, with strong form at the club's Meadow Lane ground offset by a poor away record. In February 1949, the Notts manager Arthur Stollery, who had played an important part in convincing Lawton to join the club, resigned on the grounds of ill health.

A permanent replacement for Stollery was not appointed until after the 1948–49 season's conclusion, with Eric Houghton appointed manager in May 1949. The team reported for pre-season training on 20 July, with the forward and new recruit Billy Evans among them; he had signed for Notts in June from Aston Villa for a nominal fee. The team played two trial matches in preparation for the new season. The first was a "leisurely" match at Meadow Lane on 6 August, where Billy Evans nevertheless "showed himself a thrustful forward". The second, played between the first team and a team of trialists, saw Lawton score a hat-trick, and the first team won 5–1. Houghton was questioned on his team's promotion prospects before the season began: "We may be thereabouts ourselves", he replied.

== Third Division South ==
=== August–October ===
The season opened on 20 August with a home game against Southend United. The match was played in "intense heat", and won 2–0 by Notts despite missing two first-half penalties. Lawton gained his first goal of the season in Notts County's first away match, though it was not enough to prevent the Magpies losing 4–3 at Norwich City, a scoreline that left commentators worrying that this was to be a repeat of the previous season. Lawton scored a brace in the following game at Bristol Rovers, helping his side to a 3–0 win, before Notts played Norwich again in the first match of September, this time winning 5–0 with Fred Evans earning two goals. After consecutive clean sheets, the Nottingham Journal opined that "the much-maligned defence department is a vast improvement". Notts were temporarily reduced to nine men within the first four minutes of their next game, played at home to Bournemouth & Boscombe Athletic on 3 September, following a collision between Billy Baxter and Harry Chapman; the former returned to the field with his knee heavily bandaged, the latter after an absence of 16 minutes. (Note: Substitutions were not permitted in English football until 1965.) Despite this, Notts won 2–0 with another brace from Lawton.

The Magpies were at home to Exeter City in their next game, with England selectors present to watch Lawton. He and Johnston had given the home side a 2–0 lead after 22 minutes, but Exeter led 3–2 before the hour mark, and it required a second Johnston goal nine minutes from the end to earn a 3–3 draw. The result left Notts in second place, level on points with but behind Southend, but the team took top spot following a 2–1 win at Crystal Palace, a position they would occupy for the remainder of the season. Notts won 1–0 in both of their next two games, against Watford and Reading respectively, before hosting Leyton Orient on 1 October. England selectors were once again present to watch Lawton, and they saw him, Sewell and Billy Evans each score two goals as the Magpies prevailed 7–1. "This was the County at their best", the Football Post said. "The speed of the forwards was pleasing to see."

In October, Notts announced the signing of two new players. The first was that of centre-half Alec Simpson, who joined for a £7,500 fee from Wolverhampton Wanderers on 4 October. Two days later, Notts signed the defender Tommy Deans, also for a £7,500 fee, from Clyde. The latter made his debut two days later at Newport County before what was their largest crowd since the end of World War II. The Magpies, who had not been "displaying that form expected of League leaders", found themselves 1–0 down, but Sewell's 85th-minute equaliser salvaged a point for the away team. A 4–1 home win over Bristol City followed, with Sewell earning a brace, before Notts played at Brighton & Hove Albion in their next game. The match was played in hail and rainstorms, and Brighton led 2–0 in the 22nd minute. However, two goals from Lawton had made it 2–2 by the 53rd minute, and an 89th-minute goal by Johnston gave Notts a 3–2 win. On 28 October, Notts announced the signing of the winger Frank Broome from Derby County, who made his debut at home to Walsall the following day. The Magpies required another late goal, this time an 89th minute penalty from Lawton, to secure a 1–1 draw. Notts County ended October in first place, with 23 points from 14 matches.

=== November–February ===
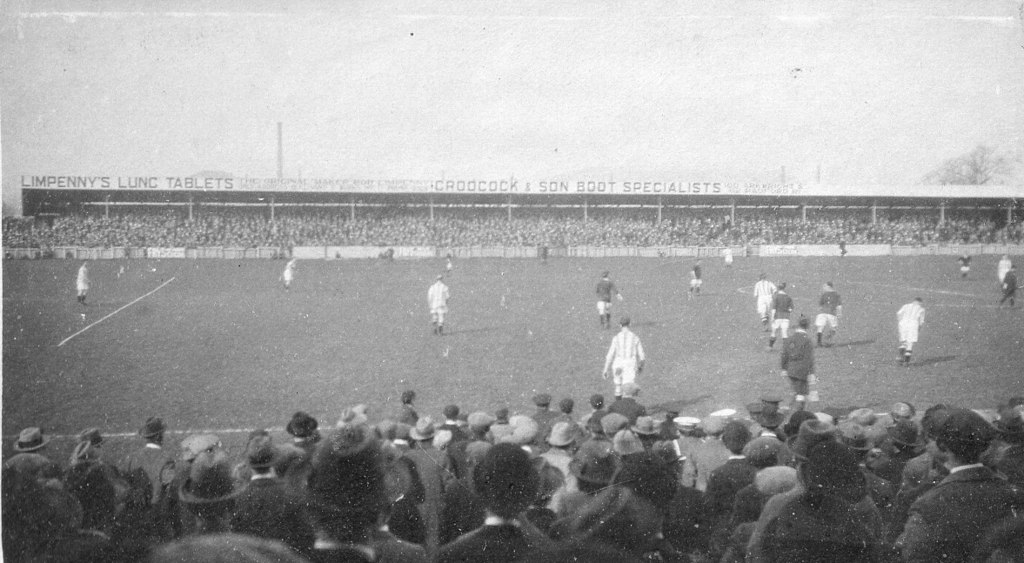
The City Ground (pictured in the 1920s) hosted the season's first Nottingham derby.

Notts County's first match of November was a 3–1 win at Millwall in which Sewell scored twice. Lawton scored a hat-trick in a 3–0 win against Swindon Town at Meadow Lane the following week, including two penalties, before the team played out a goalless draw at Torquay United. On the same day as the Torquay match, Notts County's city rivals Nottingham Forest defeated Bristol Rovers 2–0 to move into second place in the Third Division South. This meant that the season's first Nottingham derby would between first and second. The match, the first League meeting of the two clubs since February 1935, was played before an all-ticket capacity crowd. Notts took a 1–0 lead through a Lawton goal described by A.J. Turner of the Nottingham Journal as a "jet-propelled" header "of the type to be talked about for years". "No other forward could have ... folded in mid-air like a pen-knife, and headed a goal with the power and accuracy of a man taking a penalty", Desmond Hackett of the Daily Express wrote. Broome made it 2–0 Notts with nine minutes left and, although Forest pulled a goal back five minutes later, the Magpies held on to win 2–1.

Notts lost 2–0 at Southend in their next match, their first defeat in 18 games, (Note: Inclusive of League and FA Cup games.) but the team swiftly returned to winning ways, defeating Bristol Rovers 2–0 on 24 December. The Magpies then faced Ipswich Town in consecutive games on 26 and 27 December, winning both times. The first, played at Meadow Lane, saw a 2–0 home win which brought the team to 50 goals for the season. The following day, Notts had a first-half reprieve when George Perrett of Ipswich appeared to have scored for the home side, only to find the referee had already awarded his team a penalty, which was easily saved. It took until the 60th minute for the Magpies to score, but they eventually prevailed 4–0, with two goals for Lawton. Notts were one of only two Football League teams to secure three wins from their three matches over the Christmas period, but Broome and Deans both sustained injuries during this time, keeping them out of the next game, a 3–0 loss at Bournemouth. Broome returned for the next match, a home game with Crystal Palace, but Lawton and Baxter were absent, the former through injury and the latter through flu, and Notts were defeated 1–0.

After a further defeat, this one 2–1 at Watford, Notts County's lead at the top of the Third Division South had been reduced from five points to one. Two days afterwards, the Nottingham Evening Post reported that Deans was expected to return to the team in its next game, and expressed hope that Notts would be able to field a full-strength side for the first time since beating Forest. In the event, Lawton remained absent for Notts County's final match of January, but the team nevertheless beat Aldershot 3–1. The Magpies then defeated Reading 4–0 at Meadow Lane, with Lawton back in the side and among the goal scorers. A.E. Botting of the Nottingham Journal described the match as "a return to the type of football which characterised their [Notts County's] form earlier in the season". Notts next won 4–1 at Leyton Orient, with Johnston scoring two, before the team hosted Newport in the final match of February. Notts had won the previous season's corresponding fixture 11–1, and Newport fared little better this time; Sewell scored a hat-trick, Lawton a brace, and the Magpies won 7–0. Notts ended February in first place, with 44 points from 29 matches.

=== March–May ===
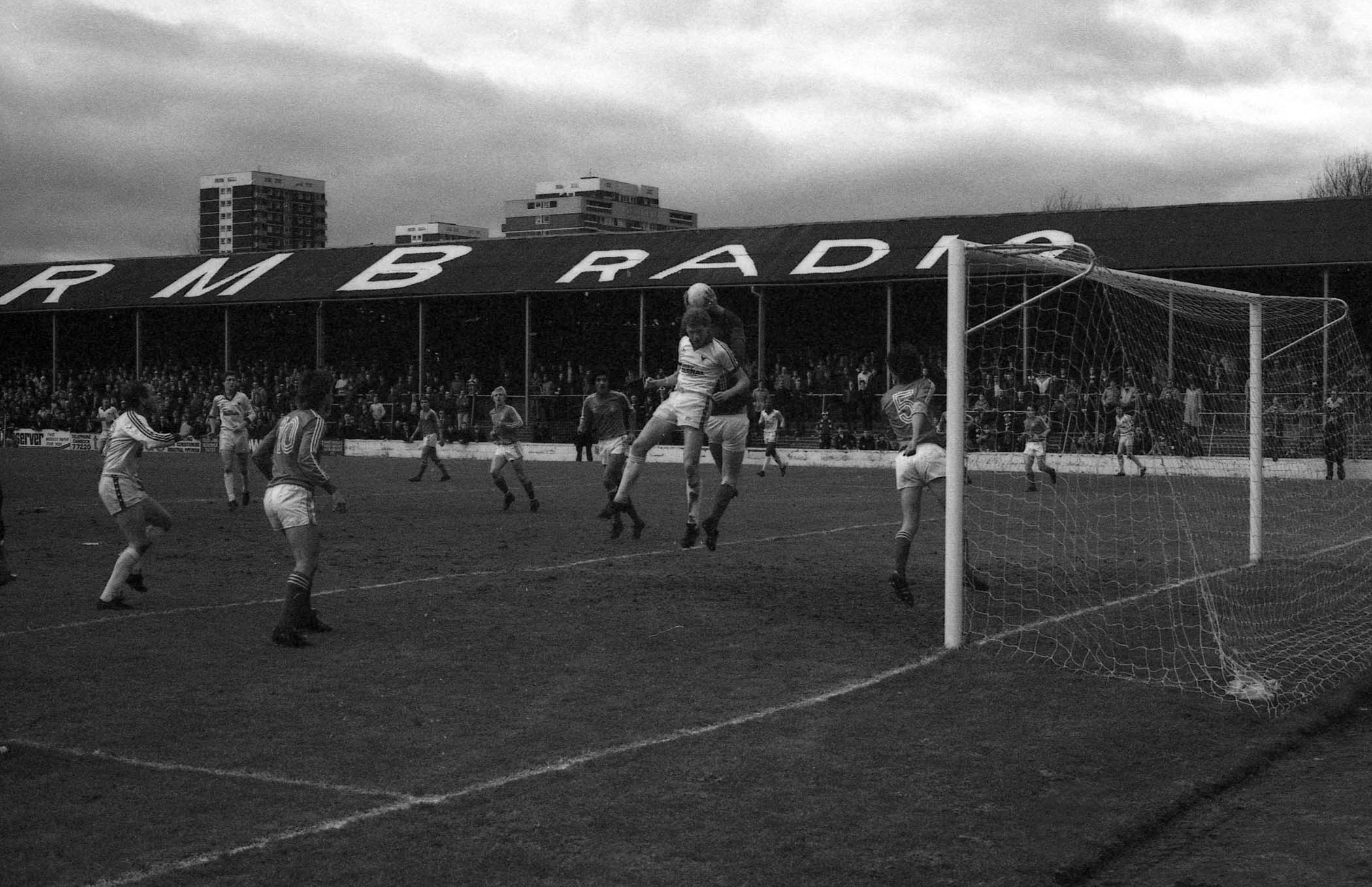
During March, Notts drew 3–3 at Walsall's Fellows Park (pictured in 1982) having been 3–0 down.

Notts County were beaten 4–0 at Bristol City in their first game at March. Sewell sustained an injury during this match, keeping him out of the team in its 4–2 win over Brighton on 11 March. Notts were 3–0 down after 63 minutes of their next game at Walsall and seemed destined to lose; this was the score until the 80th minute, when a Lawton header reduced the home team's lead to 3–1. Johnston scored a second header two minutes later to make the score 3–2 and, two minutes after that, Alec Simpson ran through and equalised for the Magpies. "It was the most thrilling finish of any match this season", the Football Post said. "They [Notts] staged a ... rally so strong it overwhelmed the Walsall defence." Simpson, who was deputising for the still injured Sewell, scored again in the final game of March, with two goals in a 2–0 home win over Millwall.

Sewell returned to the team for their match at Swindon on 1 April, but Simpson retained his place at the expense of Broome. Simpson scored again and Notts earned a 1–1 draw. The Magpies then defeated Port Vale at Meadow Lane; this result, combined with defeats on the same day for their nearest rivals, left Notts requiring only four more points to secure promotion. One of those rivals, second-placed Torquay, were visitors to Meadow Lane on 8 April. Torquay had lost their previous four matches, and "it was more or less expected that Notts would make sure of the championship". Torquay, however, led 1–0 at half time, and it required a second half Lawton equaliser to earn Notts a 1–1 draw. Forty-two buses and two football specials were required to transport Notts supporters to their team's next game, away at Port Vale on 10 April, but the Magpies were defeated 3–1. The following week, Notts travelled to Aldershot for a match between first and last, where Notts fell to a surprise 2–0 loss.

The season's second Nottingham derby was played on 22 April 1950. An all-ticket crowd of 46,000, a new record for Meadow Lane, attended the match, with some supporters arriving as early as 9.30am. Forest had the better of the first half, which ended 0–0, but Sewell gave Notts a 1–0 lead in the 58th minute, Lawton scored a second two minutes later, and match finished 2–0 to Notts. Elsewhere, Northampton Town defeated Southend, and this meant that Notts secured, not only their first ever "double" of home-and-away wins over their city rivals, but also the Third Division South championship and promotion to the Second Division. Notts hosted Northampton, now the team closest to them in the table, in the final competitive home match of the season, and the Magpies won 2–0 with two goals from Lawton. He and Sewell were both rested from the team in its return match at Northampton two days later, and Notts were beaten 5–1. Notts travelled to Exeter for their final game of the season, and the line-up included six more changes. The match finished 2–2, meaning Notts finished the season in first place with 58 points from 42 matches.

=== League match details ===
Key

- In result column, Notts County's score shown first
- H = Home match
- A = Away match
- pen. = Penalty kick
- o.g. = Own goal

Results
Date	Opponents	Result	Notts County goalscorers	Attendance
20 August 1949	Southend United (H)	2–0	F.J. Evans, Sewell	33,507
24 August 1949	Norwich City (A)	3–4	Lawton, B. Evans, Sewell	32,131
27 August 1949	Bristol Rovers (A)	3–0	Lawton (2), Johnston	24,816
1 September 1949	Norwich City (H)	5–0	F.J. Evans (2), B. Evans, Lawton, Johnston	35,304
3 September 1949	Bournemouth & Boscombe Athletic (H)	2–0	Lawton (2)	34,606
8 September 1949	Exeter City (H)	3–3	Johnston (2), Lawton	32,268
10 September 1949	Crystal Palace (A)	2–1	B. Evans, Johnston	26,847
17 September 1949	Watford (H)	1–0	Sewell	34,055
24 September 1949	Reading (A)	1–0	B. Evans	29,134
1 October 1949	Leyton Orient (H)	7–1	Sewell (2), B. Evans (2), Lawton (2), Johnston	36,436
8 October 1949	Newport County (A)	1–1	Sewell	21,543
15 October 1949	Bristol City (H)	4–1	Sewell (2), Southwell, Lawton	38,055
22 October 1949	Brighton & Hove Albion (A)	3–2	Lawton (2, 1 pen.), Johnston	17,411
29 October 1949	Walsall (H)	1–1	Lawton (pen.)	42,789
5 November 1949	Millwall (A)	3–1	Lawton, Sewell (2)	19,527
12 November 1949	Swindon Town (H)	3–0	Lawton (3, 2 pens.)	37,220
19 November 1949	Torquay United (A)	0–0		13,824
3 December 1949	Nottingham Forest (A)	2–1	Lawton, Broome	37,903
17 December 1949	Southend United (A)	0–2		14,628
24 December 1949	Bristol Rovers (H)	2–0	Broome, F.J. Evans	32,079
26 December 1949	Ipswich Town (H)	2–0	Sewell, Johnston	40,419
27 December 1949	Ipswich Town (A)	4–0	Sewell, Lawton (2), Johnston	22,982
31 December 1949	Bournemouth & Boscombe Athletic (A)	0–3		22,651
14 January 1950	Crystal Palace (H)	0–1		31,381
21 January 1950	Watford (A)	1–2	F.J. Evans	17,611
28 January 1950	Aldershot (H)	3–1	Broome, F.J. Evans, Sewell	27,076
4 February 1950	Reading (H)	4–0	Sewell, Broome, Lawton, Johnston	36,245
18 February 1950	Leyton Orient (A)	4–1	Sewell, Johnston (2), Broome	21,633
25 February 1950	Newport County (H)	7–0	Sewell (3), Lawton (2, 1 pen.), Johnston, B. Evans	28,427
4 March 1950	Bristol City (A)	0–4		32,491
11 March 1950	Brighton & Hove Albion (H)	4–2	Tennant (o.g.), Chapman, Lawton, Johnston	34,283
18 March 1950	Walsall (A)	3–3	Lawton, Johnston, Simpson	19,589
25 March 1950	Millwall (H)	2–0	Simpson (2)	31,061
1 April 1950	Swindon Town (A)	1–1	Simpson	19,876
7 April 1950	Port Vale (H)	3–1	Boyes, Lawton, Simpson	32,097
8 April 1950	Torquay United (H)	1–1	Lawton	43,456
10 April 1950	Port Vale (A)	1–3	Lawton	15,380
15 April 1950	Aldershot (A)	0–2		9,758
22 April 1950	Nottingham Forest (H)	2–0	Sewell, Lawton	46,000
27 April 1950	Northampton Town (H)	2–0	Lawton (2)	31,928
29 April 1950	Northampton Town (A)	1–5	Broome	9,971
6 May 1950	Exeter City (A)	2–2	Broome, Crookes	10,301

=== Partial league table ===
Football League Third Division South final table, leading positions
Pos	Team	Pld	W	D	L	GF	GA	GAv	Pts	Promotion or relegation
1	Notts County	42	25	8	9	95	50	1.900	58	Division Champions, promoted
2	Northampton Town	42	20	11	11	72	50	1.440	51	
3	Southend United	42	19	13	10	66	48	1.375	51	
4	Nottingham Forest	42	20	9	13	67	39	1.718	49	

== FA Cup ==
Notts County were drawn to play the winner of the tie between Gorleston and Tilbury in the first round of the FA Cup. The latter, an amateur team whose players were required to live within five miles of their club's ground, defeated their opponents 2–1, and so won the right to face Notts at Meadow Lane. Edis Stammers, who the Football Post regarded as Tilbury's best player, could not play due to injury, and Notts ultimately won the tie 4–0. In the second round, Notts were drawn away at Third Division North side Rochdale. About 4,000 Notts supporters were among the crowd which set a new record attendance for Spotland Stadium. The home team led 1–0 at half time, but Johnston and Lawton each scored in the second half, and Notts won 2–1. The Magpies progressed to the third round, where they were drawn at home to First Division side Burnley. The match was attended by an all-ticket crowd of 44,000, and Notts took a 17th-minute lead through Johnston. Shortly before half time, Harry Potts of Burnley was fouled outside of the penalty area, but he fell within it and the referee awarded a penalty which Reg Attwell converted. It was 1–1 at half time, and Burnley eventually prevailed 4–1, ending Notts County's FA Cup participation for the season.

=== FA Cup match details ===
Key

- In result column, Notts County's score shown first
- H = Home match
- A = Away match
- N = Match played at a neutral venue

Results
Date	Round	Opponents	Result	Notts County goalscorers	Attendance
26 November 1949	First	Tilbury	4–0	Broome (2), Lawton, Sewell	28,584
10 December 1949	Second	Rochdale	2–1	Johnston, Lawton	24,231
7 January 1950	Third	Burnley	1–4	Johnston	44,000

== Aftermath and legacy ==
Lawton and his wife hosted a party for the team at their home to celebrate their success, and the team took a holiday together in Torquay at the end of the season. In Nottingham, there was civic reception and promotion ball held for the team. Sewell also earned a place on an exhibition tour of Canada organised by the FA. Thoughts quickly turned to the team's prospects in the Second Division; the majority of players who had seen first-team action during the season were retained, but "Little John", the pseudonymous Football Post correspondent, wrote that Notts would "have to dig deep into the club's purse, because it is apparent that without adequate or efficient reserves no team can hope to meet continued success." In the 1950–51 season, Notts County's first in the Second Division for fifteen years, the team finished 17th in the table.

Lawton remained at Notts until 1952, and the 1949–50 season was the highpoint of his time at the club. Large crowds came to watch the team; the average home attendance of 35,176 is the club record, and the crowd of 46,000 which attended the title-clinching match with Forest is the largest to attend a League game at Meadow Lane. Lawton's 33 goals remain one of the most prolific individual seasons in the club's history; since 1949–50, only Lee Hughes in 2009–10 and Macaulay Langstaff in 2022–23 have reached the 30 goal mark. Lawton's headed goal against Forest in December 1949 became "part of Nottingham's football folklore". "I never hit a ball as hard before," he recalled. "Everything went exactly right. I just got clear and my jump was carrying me forward as I met the ball full on my forehead." More than 40 years later, club historian Tony Brown remarked that "people still talk about it ... even those of us that weren't there!" Upon Lawton's death in 1996, the Nottingham Evening Post remarked that the goal was "popularly regarded as the greatest ... ever seen in Nottingham".
