= 1936–37 Aston Villa F.C. season =

English football club season

Aston Villa
1936–37 season
- President: Patrick Hannon
- Manager: Jimmy McMullan; Jimmy Hogan
- Stadium: Villa Park
- Second Division: 9th
- FA Cup: Third round

The 1936–37 English football season was Aston Villa's 45th season in The Football League, Villa playing in the Football League Second Division. Aston Villa appointed 54 year-old Jimmy Hogan as their manager in November 1936, following the club's first ever relegation the previous season. Villa board member Frederick Rinder had witnessed Hogan leading Austria to the final of the 1936 Olympics and persuaded him to return to England. Arriving at Villa, Hogan outlined his philosophy: "I am a teacher and lover of constructive football with every pass, every kick, every movement an object."

There were debuts for Andy Kerr, George Hardy, Jackie Martin, Jim Robey, Matt Moralee, Freddie Haycock, Bob Iverson, Ronnie Starling, George Pritty and Freddie Goss.

== Second Division ==
Pos	Team	Pld	W	D	L	GF	GA	GAv	Pts
7	Sheffield United	42	18	10	14	66	54	1.222	46
8	Coventry City	42	17	11	14	66	54	1.222	45
9	Aston Villa	42	16	12	14	82	70	1.171	44
10	Tottenham Hotspur	42	17	9	16	88	66	1.333	43
11	Fulham	42	15	13	14	71	61	1.164	43

Rules for classification: 1) Points; 2) Goal average; 3) Goals scored

=== Matches ===
29 Aug 1936	Swansea Town	0–2	Aston Villa	Vetch Field
		Report	Frank Broome, 14, 48
Note: The 18-year-old Andy Kerr makes his debut.

2 Sep 1936	Nottingham Forest	1–1	Aston Villa	City Ground
			Frank Broome, 75

5 Sep 1936	Aston Villa	4–0	Southampton	Villa Park
	Frank Broome, 25; Dai Astley, 50; Gordon Hodgson, 52; Ronnie Dix, 87

7 Sep 1936	Aston Villa	1–1	Nottingham Forest	Villa Park
	Dai Astley, 37	Report

12 Sep 1936	Burnley	1–2	Aston Villa	Turf Moor
			Frank Broome, 27; Gordon Hodgson, 42

14 Sep 1936	Aston Villa	5–1	Bradford City	Villa Park
	Ronnie Dix, 7; Gordon Hodgson, 17, 36, 57; Dai Astley, 59
Note: Gordon Hodgson's play included a hat-trick in a 5–1 win against Bradford City at Villa Park on 14 September 1936. In total Hodgson scored 11 goals in 28 appearances for Villa, all of which were in the league. Gordon Hodgson's stay with Villa in the Second Division was a short one. He left for Leeds United for £1,500 on 2 March 1937, after scoring seven goals in 13 appearances for Villa in the Second Division. In total Hodgson scored 11 goals in 28 appearances for Villa, all of which were in the league.

19 Sep 1936	Aston Villa	0–3	Fulham	Villa Park

26 Sep 1936	Doncaster Rovers	1–0	Aston Villa	Belle Vue

3 Oct 1936	Aston Villa	0–0	Coventry City	Villa Park

10 Oct 1936	Plymouth Argyle	2–2	Aston Villa	Home Park
			Frank Broome, 9; Dai Astley, 49

17 Oct 1936	Bradford Park Avenue	3–3	Aston Villa	Park Avenue
			Eric Houghton, 40; Frank Broome, 50; Own goal, 70

24 Oct 1936	Aston Villa	4–2	Barnsley	Villa Park
	Frank Broome, 44, 66; Dai Astley, 63; Eric Houghton, 73

31 Oct 1936	Sheffield United	5–1	Aston Villa	Bramall Lane
			Eric Houghton, 63 (pen)

7 Nov 1936	Aston Villa	1–1	Tottenham Hotspur	Villa Park
	Matt Moralee, 46

11 Nov 1936	Bradford City	2–2	Aston Villa	Valley Parade
			Tom Griffiths, 75; Ronnie Dix, 82

14 Nov 1936	Blackpool	2–3	Aston Villa	Bloomfield Road
			Eric Houghton, 17, 47 (pen); Gordon Hodgson, 81

21 Nov 1936	Aston Villa	2–2	Blackburn Rovers	Villa Park
	Ronnie Dix, 22; Eric Houghton, 77

28 Nov 1936	Bury	2–1	Aston Villa	Gigg Lane
			Gordon Hodgson, 89

5 Dec 1936	Aston Villa	1–3	Leicester City	Villa Park
	Alex Massie, 51

19 Dec 1936	Aston Villa	3–0	Norwich City	Villa Park
	Frank Broome, 38; Ronnie Dix, 45; John Maund, 64

25 Dec 1936	Chesterfield	1–0	Aston Villa	Saltergate

26 Dec 1936	Aston Villa	4–0	Swansea Town	Villa Park
	Ronnie Dix, 50, 52, 65; Jimmy Allen, 56

28 Dec 1936	Aston Villa	6–2	Chesterfield	Villa Park
	Frank Broome, 1, 37; Ronnie Dix, 61, 87; Jimmy Allen, 73; Bob Iverson, 83

2 Jan 1937	Southampton	2–2	Aston Villa	The Dell
			Ronnie Dix, 34, 50

9 Jan 1937	Aston Villa	0–0	Burnley	Villa Park

23 Jan 1937	Fulham	3–2	Aston Villa	Craven Cottage
			Freddie Haycock, 48; Tommy Gardner, 82

30 Jan 1937	Aston Villa	1–1	Doncaster Rovers	Villa Park
	Charlie Phillips, 68

6 Feb 1937	Coventry City	1–0	Aston Villa	Highfield Road

13 Feb 1937	Aston Villa	5–4	Plymouth Argyle	Villa Park
	Eric Houghton, 33, 43, 87; Frank Broome, 47, 70

20 Feb 1937	Aston Villa	4–1	Bradford Park Avenue	Villa Park
	Eric Houghton, 8, 84; Frank Broome, 44, 79

27 Feb 1937	Barnsley	0–4	Aston Villa	Oakwell
			Ronnie Starling, 27, 85; Frank Broome, 42, 57

6 Mar 1937	Aston Villa	2–1	Sheffield United	Villa Park
	Frank Broome, 8, 28

13 Mar 1937	Tottenham Hotspur	2–2	Aston Villa	White Hart Lane
			Freddie Haycock, 24; Ronnie Starling, 70

20 Mar 1937	Aston Villa	4–0	Blackpool	Villa Park
	Frank Broome, 17, 34, 54; Freddie Haycock, 51

26 Mar 1937	Newcastle United	0–2	Aston Villa	St James’ Park
			Frank Broome, 10

27 Mar 1937	Blackburn Rovers	3–4	Aston Villa	Ewood Park
			Frank Broome, 8, 15, 62; Eric Houghton, 19

30 Mar 1937	Aston Villa	0–2	Newcastle United	Villa Park

3 Apr 1937	Aston Villa	0–4	Bury	Villa Park

10 Apr 1937	Leicester City	1–0	Aston Villa	Filbert Street

17 Apr 1937	Aston Villa	0–2	West Ham United	Villa Park

24 Apr 1937	Norwich City	5–1	Aston Villa	Carrow Road
			Frank Broome, 48

26 Apr 1937	West Ham United	2–1	Aston Villa	Upton Park
			Ronnie Starling, 63 (pen)

Source: avfchistory.co.uk

== FA Cup ==
The 44 First and Second Division clubs entered the competition at the Third Round stage along with Chester, Port Vale and Luton Town.

The matches were scheduled for Saturday, 16 January 1937.

Tie no	Home team	Score	Away team	Date
10	Aston Villa	2–3	Burnley	16 January 1937

== See also ==
- List of Aston Villa F.C. records and statistics
