= 1937–38 Aston Villa F.C. season =

English football club season

Aston Villa
1937–38 season
- President: Patrick Hannon
- Chairman: Fred Normansell
- Manager: Jimmy Hogan
- 2nd Division: 1st
- FA Cup: Third round
Home colours

The 1937–38 English football season was Aston Villa's 46th season in The Football League, Villa playing in the Football League Second Division. The team won promotion back to the top flight and reached the FA Cup semi-final in 1937–38

There were debuts for Frank Shell, Bill Carey, Tommy Clayton and Jeff Barker.

== Second Division ==
Pos	Team	Pld	W	D	L	GF	GA	GAv	Pts	Qualification or relegation
1	Aston Villa (C, P)	42	25	7	10	73	35	2.086	57	Promotion to the First Division
2	Manchester United (P)	42	22	9	11	82	50	1.640	53	Promotion to the First Division
3	Sheffield United	42	22	9	11	73	56	1.304	53	
4	Coventry City	42	20	12	10	66	45	1.467	52	
5	Tottenham Hotspur	42	19	6	17	76	54	1.407	44	

Rules for classification: 1) Points; 2) Goal average; 3) Goals scored
(C) Champions; (P) Promoted

=== Matches ===
28 August 1937	Aston Villa	2–0	West Ham United	Villa Park
	Freddie Haycock; John Maund	Report

1 September 1937	Luton Town	3–2	Aston Villa	Kenilworth Road
		Report	John Maund; Alex Massie

4 September 1937	Southampton	0–0	Aston Villa	The Dell
		Report

6 September 1937	Aston Villa	4–1	Luton Town	Villa Park
	Frank Broome; Charlie Phillips	Report

11 September 1937	Aston Villa	2–1	Blackburn Rovers	Villa Park
	Freddie Haycock; John Maund	Report

16 September 1937	Norwich City	1–0	Aston Villa	Carrow Road
		Report

18 September 1937	Sheffield Wednesday	2–1	Aston Villa	Hillsborough
		Report	Freddie Haycock; Bob Iverson

25 September 1937	Aston Villa	2–0	Fulham	Villa Park
	Frank Broome; Freddie Haycock	Report

2 October 1937	Plymouth Argyle	0–3	Aston Villa	Home Park
		Report	Frank Broome (2); Eric Houghton

9 October 1937	Aston Villa	0–2	Chesterfield	Villa Park
		Report
Note: Villa were unchanged apart from the return of Captain, Cuthbert "Unlucky" Phillips in place of Andy Kerr: Biddlestone, Callaghan, Cummings, Massie, Allen, Iverson, Phillips, Haycock, Broome, Starling, Houghton

16 October 1937	Aston Villa	2–0	Newcastle United	Villa Park
	Eric Houghton (2)	Report

23 October 1937	Nottingham Forest	0–2	Aston Villa	City Ground
		Report	Frank Broome; Eric Houghton

30 October 1937	Aston Villa	1–1	Coventry City	Villa Park
	Eric Houghton	Report

6 November 1937	Bury	1–1	Aston Villa	Gigg Lane
		Report	Freddie Haycock

13 November 1937	Aston Villa	0–0	Burnley	Villa Park
		Report

20 November 1937	Manchester United	3–1	Aston Villa	Old Trafford
		Report	Bob Iverson

27 November 1937	Aston Villa	1–0	Sheffield United	Villa Park
	Tommy Clayton	Report

4 December 1937	Tottenham Hotspur	2–1	Aston Villa	White Hart Lane
		Report	Eric Houghton

11 December 1937	Aston Villa	7–1	Stockport County	Villa Park
	Frank Shell (3); Eric Houghton; Freddie Haycock; Frank Broome (2)	Report

18 December 1937	Barnsley	0–1	Aston Villa	Oakwell
		Report	Frank Shell

27 December 1937	Bradford Park Avenue	1–2	Aston Villa	Park Avenue
		Report	Frank Shell; Freddie Haycock

28 December 1937	Aston Villa	3–0	Barnsley	Villa Park
	Alex Massie; Frank Broome (2)	Report

1 January 1938	West Ham United	1–1	Aston Villa	Upton Park
		Report	Own goal

15 January 1938	Aston Villa	3–0	Southampton	Villa Park
	Freddie Haycock (2); Eric Houghton	Report

27 January 1938	Blackburn Rovers	1–0	Aston Villa	Ewood Park
		Report

29 January 1938	Aston Villa	4–3	Sheffield Wednesday	Villa Park
	Ronnie Starling (2); Eric Houghton; Frank Broome	Report

5 February 1938	Fulham	1–1	Aston Villa	Craven Cottage
		Report	Eric Houghton

19 February 1938	Chesterfield	0–1	Aston Villa	Saltergate
		Report	Frank Broome

23 February 1938	Aston Villa	3–0	Plymouth Argyle	Villa Park
	John Maund; Freddie Haycock; Frank Broome	Report

26 February 1938	Newcastle United	2–0	Aston Villa	St James’ Park
		Report

9 March 1938	Aston Villa	1–2	Nottingham Forest	Villa Park
	George Hardy	Report

12 March 1938	Coventry City	0–1	Aston Villa	Highfield Road
		Report	Ronnie Starling

19 March 1938	Aston Villa	2–1	Bury	Villa Park
	Frank Broome; Freddie Haycock	Report

2 April 1938	Aston Villa	3–0	Manchester United	Villa Park
	Frank Broome; John Maund; Eric Houghton (pen)	Report

5 April 1938	Burnley	3–0	Aston Villa	Turf Moor
		Report

9 April 1938	Sheffield United	0–0	Aston Villa	Bramall Lane
		Report

16 April 1938	Aston Villa	2–0	Tottenham Hotspur	Villa Park
	Frank Broome (2)	Report

18 April 1938	Swansea Town	2–1	Aston Villa	Vetch Field
		Report	Ronnie Starling

19 April 1938	Aston Villa	4–0	Swansea Town	Villa Park
	Bob Iverson; Frank Shell (2); Eric Houghton	Report

23 April 1938	Stockport County	1–3	Aston Villa	Edgeley Park
		Report	Freddie Haycock; Frank Broome (2)

27 April 1938	Aston Villa	2–0	Bradford Park Avenue	Villa Park
	Frank Broome; Freddie Haycock	Report

7 May 1938	Aston Villa	2–0	Norwich City	Villa Park
	Frank Shell; Freddie Haycock	Report

Source: avfchistory.co.uk

== FA Cup ==
The 44 First and Second Division clubs entered the competition at the Third Round stage along with Chester, Millwall and Notts County.

The matches were scheduled for Saturday, 8 January 1938.

Tie no	Home team	Score	Away team	Date
17	Norwich City	2–3	Aston Villa	8 January 1938

Fourth round

The matches were scheduled for Saturday, 22 January 1938.

Tie no	Home team	Score	Away team	Date
4	Aston Villa	4–0	Blackpool	22 January 1938

Fifth round

The matches were scheduled for Saturday, 12 February 1938.

Tie no	Home team	Score	Away team	Date
6	Charlton Athletic	1–1	Aston Villa	12 February 1938
Replay	Aston Villa	2–2	Charlton Athletic	16 February 1938
Replay	Aston Villa	4–1	Charlton Athletic	21 February 1938

Sixth Round

The four quarter-final ties were scheduled to be played on Saturday, 5 March 1938.

Tie no	Home team	Score	Away team	Date
1	Aston Villa	3–2	Manchester City	5 March 1938

Semi-finals

The semi-final matches were played on Saturday, 26 March 1938. Preston North End and Huddersfield Town won their matches to meet in the final at Wembley.

26 March 1938
15:00

Preston North End	2–1	Aston Villa

Bramall Lane, Sheffield
