= John Maund (footballer) =

English footballer

Personal information
- Full name: John Henry Maund
- Date of birth: 5 January 1916
- Place of birth: Hednesford, England
- Date of death: 1994 (aged 77–78)
- Height: 5 ft 4 1/2 in (1.64 m)
- Position: Right winger

Senior career*
Years	Team	Apps	(Gls)
1933–1934	Hednesford Town		
1934–1939	Aston Villa	47	(8)
1939–1946	Nottingham Forest	0	(0)
1946–1948	Walsall	32	(7)
- * Club domestic league appearances and goals

John Henry Maund (5 January 1916 – 1994) was an English footballer who played as a right winger for Hednesford Town, Aston Villa, Nottingham Forest, and Walsall.

== Career ==
Maund joined Aston Villa from Hednesford Town in October 1934. He was sold to Nottingham Forest in July 1939. During World War II he played as a guest for Notts County, Walsall, Northampton Town, and Port Vale. He later played for Walsall, and also worked as the club's assistant trainer.

== Career statistics ==
Appearances and goals by club, season and competition
Club	Season	League			FA Cup		Other		Total	
Club	Season	Division	Apps	Goals	Apps	Goals	Apps	Goals	Apps	Goals
Aston Villa	1935–36	First Division	4	2	0	0	0	0	4	2
Aston Villa	1936–37	Second Division	30	1	1	0	0	0	31	1
Aston Villa	1937–38	Second Division	13	5	0	0	0	0	13	5
Aston Villa	Total		47	8	1	0	0	0	48	8
Nottingham Forest	1939–40	–	0	0	0	0	3	1	3	1
Walsall	1946–47	Third Division South	16	6	3	1	0	0	19	7
Walsall	1947–48	Third Division South	16	1	3	1	0	0	19	2
Walsall	Total		32	7	6	2	0	0	38	9
Career total			79	15	7	2	3	1	89	18
