= Andrew Kerr (disambiguation) =

Andrew Kerr (1878–1969) was an American football coach.

Andrew or Andy Kerr may also refer to:

- Andrew Kerr (Australian politician) (1837–1907), New South Wales politician
- Andrew Kerr (broadcaster), Scottish television presenter and journalist
- Andrew Kerr (festival co-founder) (1933–2014), co-founder of Glastonbury Fair
- Andrew Kerr (water polo) (born 1954), Australian water polo player
- Andrew England Kerr (born 1958), Member of the European Parliament
- Andrew Kerr (civil servant), chief executive of Wiltshire Council
- Andy Kerr (Scottish politician) (born 1962), Labour politician and former Member of the Scottish Parliament
- Andy Kerr (footballer, born 1917) English footballer
- Andy Kerr (footballer, born 1931) (1931–1997), Scottish footballer
- Andy Kerr (footballer, born 1966), English footballer
- Andy Kerr (American politician) (born 1968), American politician from Colorado
- Andy Kerr (musician), Canadian musician
- Andy Kerr (weightlifter), English weightlifter who competed for England
- Andy Kerr (environmentalist) (born 1955), conservation advocate and writer

== See also ==
- Andrew Ker of Faldonside (died 1598), Scottish courtier
- Andrew Ker (born 1954), Scottish rugby union player and cricketer
- Andy Kerr Stadium, a stadium named for the football coach
