= Frank Broome =

English footballer and manager

Personal information
- Full name: Frank Henry Broome
- Date of birth: 11 June 1915
- Place of birth: Berkhamsted, England
- Date of death: 10 September 1994 (aged 79)
- Place of death: Exeter, England
- Height: 5 ft 7 in (1.70 m)
- Position: Forward

Senior career*
Years	Team	Apps	(Gls)
1932–1933	Boxmoor United		
1933–1934	Berkhamsted Town		(53)
1934–1946	Aston Villa	136	(78)
1946–1949	Derby County	112	(45)
1949–1952	Notts County	105	(35)
1953	Brentford	6	(1)
1953–1954	Crewe Alexandra	36	(16)
1954–1955	Shelbourne	?	(0)

International career
1938–1949	England	7	(3)

Managerial career
- 1955–1958: Notts County (assistant)
- 1957: Notts County (caretaker)
- 1958–1960: Exeter City
- 1960: Southend United
- 1961–1962: Bankstown
- 1962–1967: Corinthian
- 1967: Melita Eagles
- 1967–1969: Exeter City
- * Club domestic league appearances and goals

Frank Broome (11 June 1915 – 10 September 1994) was an English professional footballer and manager. He played for Aston Villa during his professional career and won seven caps as an England striker, scoring three times, including once against Germany on his debut in 1938.

Frank Broome attended Victoria School, Berkhamsted, Herts where he excelled as centre forward in the school team. He began playing for Berkhamsted Town in 1933 and soon began to attract the attention of scouts from Charlton, Chelsea, Luton, Tottenham Hotspur and West Ham. In Jan and Feb 1934, Broome scored five goals in two consecutive matches, including against Aylesbury Utd in the Bucks Senior Cup, further enhancing his profile. In October 1934 Broome was selected to play for a team representing the Spartan League against a Tottenham Hotspur Combination 11 at Maidenhead. He scored both goals in a 3–2 defeat. He played again for the Spartan League team a couple of weeks later against an Isthmian League team at Chesham. His place in the Berkhamsted team was taken by his brother Reg.

His impressive form earned him a trial for Aston Villa. He scored six goals for the Villa Colts side in a 15–0 victory over Moor Green on 31 October 1934. The performance was enough to convince for Villa to sign him up professionally in November and he duly scored another four goals against Stoke City. A report of the match stated that although Broome was on the "small side, he has a fine turn of speed and can trick an opponent cleverly".

Broome made his Villa debut in an away match at Portsmouth in April 1935. He then scored twice on his home debut in a 4–2 defeat of Liverpool. Broome continued to excel in leading Villa's attack during the 1935–36 season including two goals in the home derby match against Birmingham City but it wasn't enough to prevent the club being relegated for first time in its history.

During the 1936–37 season, Villa did well for three quarters of the season but finished 9th due to a drastic post-Easter slump in form which concluded with a 2–1 defeat at West Ham, their sixth successive loss.

In their second season in Division 2, Broome sometimes operated as a winger to make way for new signing James Clayon at centre forward. He scored two at Plymouth Argyle in October in front of 40,000 spectators. He scored another two in a 7–1 rout of Stockport County in December. Goals continued for Broome in the new year including a 3–0 victory at home to Man Utd on 2 April which maintained their hopes of promotion. This was followed by another brace of goals against Tottenham in a hard-fought 2–0 victory on 16 April. Villa duly secured promotion back to Division One on 27 April 1938 with a 2–0 win over Bradford.

Broome was selected to represent England as a reserve in a game against Scotland in April 1938 at Wembley. He then joined England for a post season Continental Tour with first match against Germany at the Olympic Stadium in Berlin on 14 May 1938. The match was notable for the English team giving the Nazi salute during the opening formalities as instructed to do so by the FA. England were triumphant running out 3–6 winners in front of a crowd of 110,000 in stifling hot conditions. Bastin, Broome and Stanley Matthews tormented the German defence and Broome scored his first international goal. Coincidentally, Villa also embarked on a post season three week tour of Germany. They won 2–3 against a German FA side in front of 100,000 spectators on 15 May with Broome netting two. According to Villa manager James Hogan, 'The German people think Frank Broome is really marvellous.'

Broome rejoined the England touring party and was part of the team which lost to Switzerland in Zurich 2–1 on 21 May. England concluded its tour with a 2–4 win against France at Colombes Stadium, Paris in front of 70,000 spectators on 26 May. Broome scored again in the opening five minutes.

The 1938–39 season began badly for Broome when he tore a ligament in his right ankle in a match against Grimsby. He returned in September despite not fully recovered in a 5–0 home win against Brentford. He was selected again for England against Norway but as inside-right rather than centre forward or right wing. The game was played at Newcastle on 9 November with England winning 4–0 but Broome clearly struggled in an unfamiliar position. He was back among the goals for Villa in a 6–3 demolition of Chelsea on 19 November. He also scored in a 1–1 draw at home to Sunderland on 27 December. His sparkling form continued in the new year bagging two goals in a 2–4 victory away at Brentford; and another two in a 2–0 defeat of Liverpool at home. In March 1939, he found time to marry Elsie Williams of Handsworth at the parish church in Berkhamsted. The bride was given away by Frank's brother Reg.They set up home in Handsworth Wood. On 13 May he represented England on the left wing in a 2–2 away draw against Italy in Milan on 13 May.

Broome's career was interrupted by the outbreak of World War II. In September 1939, he played in Villa's last pre-war game, a 1–0 defeat at Derby County. On 4th September the Government announced a ban on Sport to prevent crowds gathering. Villa's League match away to Wolves was one of over thirty mid-week League fixtures called-off. Villa Park found itself in an evacuation district designated under the British Government's civilian evacuation scheme. The Police Chief Constable of Birmingham, C.C.H Moriarty, intimated that he would not sanction football matches within the city of Birmingham. The Football League's Scheme for War-time football proposed to limit gates to 8,000 in evacuation areas. With their large overheads, the directors of Aston Villa and Sunderland announced their intention to close down. The manager and players were paid off whilst Villa Park was commandeered by the War Office. Villa's players quickly found war-time employment. Broome engaged in factory work of national importance.

Broome guested for Nottingham Forest during WW2, making 3 appearances (1 goal) in 1939–40, 1 appearance (4 goals) in 1940–41 and 10 appearances (4 goals) in 1941–42. He also guested for Wolves during wartime, playing and scoring in the 1942 War Cup Final.

In 1955 Broome signed for Shelbourne, making his League of Ireland debut on 27 February. The nearest he came to scoring was when he had a penalty saved at Glenmalure Park on 27 March in the FAI Cup.

Approaching 40 years of age and coupled with the expense of weekly flights to Dublin he ended up only playing 6 games for Shels.

After retiring from playing, he went on to manage both Exeter City, Southend United and in Australia.
