= Gordon Clayton =

Gordon Clayton may refer to:

- Gordon Clayton (footballer, born 1936) (1936–1991), English football goalkeeper
- Gordon Clayton (footballer, born 1910) (1910–1976), English football centre forward
