= Maund =

Maund may refer to:

- Maund (unit), traditional Indian unit of mass measurement
- Maundy (foot washing), religious rite observed by various Christian denominations
- Maund (surname), surname
- Maundy Thursday, the day during Holy Week that commemorates the Washing of the Feet and Last Supper
