= Des Tennant =

Welsh footballer

Personal information
- Full name: Desmond Warren Tennant
- Date of birth: 17 October 1925
- Place of birth: Aberdare, Wales
- Date of death: 12 January 2009 (aged 83)
- Place of death: Wales
- Height: 5 ft 8 in (1.73 m)
- Position: Right back

Youth career
- –: Cardiff City

Senior career*
Years	Team	Apps	(Gls)
1947–1948	Barry	31	(4)
1948–1959	Brighton & Hove Albion	400	(40)
- * Club domestic league appearances and goals

Desmond Warren Tennant (17 October 1925 – 12 January 2009) was a Welsh professional footballer who scored 40 goals from 400 appearances in the Football League playing for Brighton & Hove Albion.

== Life and career ==
Tennant was born in Aberdare and attended the town's Boys' Grammar School, where he played both football and rugby. He began his football career as a junior with Cardiff City, when he was capped by Wales at youth level. After making 31 appearances in the Southern League for Barry, Tennant joined Brighton & Hove Albion, making his Football League debut in the 1948–49 season. Although primarily a right back, he played in a variety of positions, and was the club's top scorer in his first season with 11 goals in all competitions. Nicknamed "The Tank", he was described as a "very important player" in the Brighton team promoted to the Second Division for the first time in 1957–58. By the time he retired in 1959, having lost his place to Tommy Bisset, he had played 424 matches and scored 47 goals in all competitions. He then joined the coaching staff at the club, later acting as chief scout.

After leaving football he worked for the ambulance service and kept a pub before retiring to his native South Wales, where he was a mainstay of the local choir. He was married to Eileen, and the couple had three children. In later life he suffered from motor neurone disease and Parkinson's disease, and died in 2009 at the age of 83.
