= Maund (surname) =

Maund is a surname. Notable people with the surname include:

- Aaron Maund (born 1990), American soccer player
- Benjamin Maund (1790–1863), British pharmacist, botanist etc.
- Edward Arthur Maund (1851–1932), British-born Rhodesian pioneer
- Jeff Maund (born 1976), Canadian ice hockey goaltender
- John Maund (c1876–c1962), Australian rugby union player
- John Maund (bishop) (1909–1998), British-born Bishop of Lesotho
- John Maund (footballer) (1916–1994), English footballer
- John Oakley Maund (1846–1902), English banker, stockbroker etc.
- Loben Maund (1892–1957), rear admiral in the Royal Navy
