= Izidor Kürschner =

Hungarian football player and coach

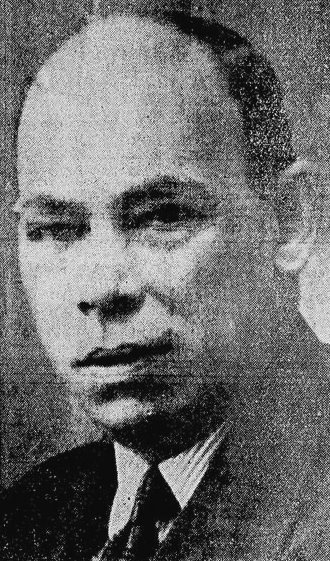
- Kürschner in 1937

Personal information
- Date of birth: 29 June 1885
- Place of birth: Budapest, Austria-Hungary
- Date of death: 8 December 1941 (aged 56)
- Place of death: Rio de Janeiro, Brazil
- Position: Defender

Senior career*
Years	Team	Apps	(Gls)
1904–1913	MTK Budapest		

International career
1907–1911	Hungary	5	(0)

Managerial career
- 1920–1921: 1. FC Nürnberg
- 1921–1922: Eintracht Frankfurt
- 1922–1924: FC Nordstern Basel
- 1924: Switzerland
- Schwarz-Weiß Essen
- 1925–1934: Grasshoppers
- 1934–1935: Young Boys
- 1937–1938: CR Flamengo
- Botafogo FR
- * Club domestic league appearances and goals

Izidor "Dori" Kürschner, in Brazil primarily known as Dori Kruschner, (29 June 1885 – 8 December 1941), was a Hungarian football player and coach. As player he was successful with Budapest club MTK, and also played for the Hungary national team. As coach he succeeded in Germany, winning the national championship with 1. FC Nürnberg. His greatest triumphs were to follow in Switzerland with the Grasshopper Club Zürich, where he won seven titles. Kürschner's arrival to Brazilian football brought tactical innovations which helped to establish the country as one of the world leaders in the sport.

Kürschner was born in Hungary and was Jewish.

== Playing career ==
Kürschner was a defensive player on the left side of the field who also found use as centre half. He impressed less with his physique and technique then with his astute positioning and his penchant for headers. His game was marked by simplicity and decisiveness.

He played for MTK in his hometown Budapest and contributed to their Championships in 1904 and 1908 as well as their three consecutive wins of the Magyar Kupa between 1910 and 1912. Between 1907 and 1911 he also was called up five times to play for the Hungary national football team.

In 1911, to supplement his income, along with fellow MTK player Gyula Kertész he set up a photographic studio.

== Coaching career ==
=== Beginnings in Budapest and Stuttgart ===
Kürschner commenced his coaching career in 1918 with MTK in Budapest taking over from the previous coach Jimmy Hogan, but departed the following year, moving on to Stuttgarter Kickers in the south-west of Germany. There he stayed for two years and won in 1921 the championship of Württemberg, which qualified the club for the Southern German Championship.

=== Championship with Nürnberg ===
Stuttgart were ousted soon, thus Kürschner became available to lead title defenders 1. FC Nürnberg through the play-offs for the national German title. There the Nürnbergers defeated in the final Vorwärts 90 from Berlin (a precursor club to today's SpVgg Blau-Weiß 1890 Berlin) with 5–0.

After this short-term engagement FC Bayern Munich hired Kürschner for the next season as successor to the great Englishman William Townley. Bayern only managed second place in the Southern Bavarian Championship behind local rivals FC Wacker Munich, and thus failed to qualify for the national tournament. This freed Kürschner to guide Nürnberg through their play-off campaign once more.

He led the team to its third consecutive German Championship final where the ascending Hamburger SV was the opponent. Two epic matches over altogether more than five hours in what is referred to in German football folklore as the "eternal final", did not produce a winner, and in the consequence no title was awarded in that season.

In the next season Kürschner was made the first full-time coach of Eintracht Frankfurt. With only one defeat Frankfurt wins the Group I. of the North Main (→ river Main) league, which was then one of the many divisions that constituted first level football in Germany. However, in the matches for the overall North Main championship the local opponent Germania 94 Frankfurt prevails.

=== Great success in Switzerland ===
After this Kürschner was to work for many years in Switzerland. His first appointment was in 1923–24 with FC Nordstern Basel, where he also was the first full-time coach in club history. Leading them to promotion to the first division laid the cornerstone to the grandest period in Nordstern's history.

==== Olympic Silver for the national team ====
In 1924 Kürschner joined up with Teddy Duckworth and Jimmy Hogan to prepare the players of the Swiss national football team in regional groups for the Olympic Games in Paris.

In Paris the team, under the leadership of Duckworth, made it all the way to the finals. Only the giants of that era Uruguay could eventually put a halt to the Swiss juggernaut when they defeated them 3–0 in a hopelessly overcrowded stadium and thus retained their Gold from the previous tournament. To date, this remains the greatest success in the history of Swiss football. Incidentally, in the semi-finals the Urus overcame the Dutch side led by the aforementioned William Townley, who, in those days was also associated with the Swiss club FC St. Gallen.

Later in that year, Kürschner briefly became the first full-time coach of Schwarz-Weiss Essen in the west of Germany. In a friendly they defeated Kürschner's home team MTK 2–1.

==== Decade of triumphs with Grasshoppers ====
From 1925 until 1934 Kürschner was manager of Grasshopper Club Zürich. The three national championships in 1927, 1928, and 1931 plus four wins in the Swiss cup final made him the second most successful coach in the history of this club.

The German language edition of Wikipedia notes in its article regarding the Grasshoppers, that in 1931 the club was voted the "fourth strongest European side by football experts from all over Europe".

After Kürschner's departure from Switzerland the legendary Austrian Karl Rappan followed the Hungarian on the bench and expanded on the success of the club until 1948. Rappan was also a founding father of the European cup competitions.

=== Innovator in Rio de Janeiro ===
He arrived in Rio de Janeiro in March 1937 and within a month saw himself at the helm of CR Flamengo which was then the team of the legendary striker Leonidas da Silva, the famous Rubber Man.

==== Flamengo ====
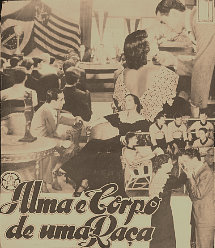
Card to the movie "Alma e Corpo de uma Raça" (1938) with Flamengo flag

At the Mengão he succeeded Flávio Costa who had been player-manager from September 1934 until January 1937. Costa became Kürschner's assistant and eventually his successor. Beyond this, Costa should once be regarded the probably greatest coach in Brazil in the earlier parts of the 20th century. He was to amass titles not only with Flamengo and local rivals CR Vasco da Gama, but he also led the Brazil national football team to its then only third Copa América title and even to the, albeit for the local audience anticlimactical, second place in the World Cup finals of 1950.

Kürschner promoted a more controlled, defensive style of the game in Brazil. He introduced not only things like training without ball, but most importantly also the WM system, which had been in use in England since the 1920s. In the course of the preparations for the World Cup 1938 in France – where Brazil was to debut amongst the top four – he familiarized the coaching staff of the association with state-of-the-art European football and training methodology.

His time with Flamengo came to an end on matchday one of the Campeonato Carioca campaign 1938 on 4 September – a match that was also used for the opening of the club's new Estádio da Gávea. Flamengo lost 0–2 to Vasco da Gama. This triggered a crisis and led to the almost instantaneous sacking of Kürschner.

==== Botafogo ====
Later on in 1939 Kürschner was hired by Botafogo FR, then based in a district close by to Flamengo, where he achieved a third consecutive second place in the Championship of Rio. He nevertheless was let go from Botafogo in August 1940.

In April 1941 he was one of the contenders for the coaching position of the Canto do Rio FC of Niterói on the other side of Guanabara Bay when the club prepared for joining the Rio Championship.

On the evening of 8 December 1941 he died from a heart attack in Rio de Janeiro. He was laid to rest in the Cemetery São João de Batista in Botafogo.

==== Film ====
Kürschner can be seen in the Brazilian movie Alma e Corpo de uma Raça ("Body and Soul of a Race") from 1938 by director Milton Rodrigues (1905–1972). In a scene describing real life in the young country he appears in the context of the famous Fla-Flu Derby of Flamengo versus Fluminense FC.

== See also ==
- List of select Jewish football (association; soccer) players
