= 1935–36 Aston Villa F.C. season =

English football club season

Aston Villa
1935–36 season
- President: Patrick Hannon
- Manager: Jimmy McMullan
- Stadium: Villa Park
- First Division: 21st
- FA Cup: Third round

Second City Derby
- 21--12--16

The 1935–36 English football season was Aston Villa's 44th season in The Football League, Villa playing in the Football League First Division.

This was manager Jimmy McMullan's 2nd. season. After 11 matches (3W 6L 2D) McMullan was sacked after with no new manager appointed that season. Aston Villa and Blackburn Rovers were relegated from the First Division and therefore became the last two founder members of the Football League to lose top flight status for the first time. At the start of the season The Times had tipped Villa as a Championship contender.

Gordon Hodgson transferred to Aston Villa on 8 January 1936 and scored 11 goals in 28 appearances for the Villans. Hodgson made his Villa debut in a 3–0 defeat against Preston North End at Deepdale on 18 January 1936. His first goal for Villa came in a 4–3 defeat against Bolton Wanderers at Burnden Park on 15 February 1936. He was relegated with Aston Villa at the end of the 1935–36 season, his four goals in 15 league appearances not enough to help them beat the drop.

There were debuts for Alex Massie, Norman Young, Tom Griffiths, George Cummings, Charlie Drinkwater, Jack Palethorpe, Jackie Williams, John Maund, Gordon Hodgson and Charlie Phillips.

== Table ==
Pos	Team	Pld	W	D	L	GF	GA	GAv	Pts	Relegation
18	West Bromwich Albion	42	16	6	20	89	88	1.011	38	
19	Liverpool	42	13	12	17	60	64	0.938	38	
20	Sheffield Wednesday	42	13	12	17	63	77	0.818	38	
21	Aston Villa (R)	42	13	9	20	81	110	0.736	35	Relegation to the Second Division
22	Blackburn Rovers (R)	42	12	9	21	55	96	0.573	33	Relegation to the Second Division

Source: World Football
Rules for classification: 1) Points; 2) Goal average; 3) Goals scored
(R) Relegated

=== Matches ===
31 August 1935	Aston Villa	1–2	Sheffield Wednesday	Villa Park
	Arthur Cunliffe 72'	Report

4 September 1935	Middlesbrough	2–1	Aston Villa	Ayresome Park
		Report	Pongo Waring 28'; Eric Houghton

7 September 1935	Portsmouth	3–0	Aston Villa	Fratton Park
		Report

9 September 1935	Aston Villa	2–7	Middlesbrough	Villa Park
	Ronnie Dix 46'; Ronnie Dix 70'	Report

14 September 1935	Aston Villa	5–1	Preston North End	Villa Park
	Eric Houghton (pen) 39'; Dai Astley 44'; Dai Astley 48'; Pongo Waring 53'; Billy Kingdon 89'	Report

16 September 1935	Aston Villa	2–2	Sunderland	Villa Park
	Pongo Waring 38'	Report

21 September 1935	Brentford	1–2	Aston Villa	Griffin Park
		Report	Pongo Waring 20'; Dai Astley 39'

28 September 1935	Aston Villa	0–2	Derby County	Villa Park
		Report

5 October 1935	Everton	2–2	Aston Villa	Goodison Park
		Report	Frank Broome 50'; Frank Broome 70'

12 October 1935	Aston Villa	1–2	Bolton Wanderers	Villa Park
	Eric Houghton (pen) 80'	Report

19 October 1935	Aston Villa	0–7	West Bromwich Albion	Villa Park
		Report

26 October 1935	Leeds United	4–2	Aston Villa	Elland Road
		Report	Dai Astley 8'; Ronnie Dix 30'

2 November 1935	Aston Villa	2–6	Grimsby Town	Villa Park
	Jimmy McLuckie 54'; Eric Houghton 76'	Report

9 November 1935	Liverpool	3–2	Aston Villa	Anfield
		Report	Eric Houghton 37'; Frank Broome 87'

16 November 1935	Aston Villa	2–2	Chelsea	Villa Park
	Charlie Drinkwater 5'; Jack Palethorpe 58'	Report

23 November 1935	Birmingham	2–2	Aston Villa	St Andrew’s
		Report	Dai Astley 9'; Dai Astley 24'
Note: In the Second City derby Villa held Birmingham to a draw at St Andrews before beating them 2–1 at Villa Park.

30 November 1935	Aston Villa	4–0	Stoke City	Villa Park
	Ronnie Dix 37'; Jackie Williams 50'; Eric Houghton 66'; Jackie Williams 86'	Report

7 December 1935	Manchester City	5–0	Aston Villa	Maine Road
		Report

14 December 1935	Aston Villa	1–7	Arsenal	Villa Park
	Jack Palethorpe 64'	Report

21 December 1935	Blackburn Rovers	5–1	Aston Villa	Ewood Park
		Report	Frank Broome 87'

25 December 1935	Aston Villa	4–1	Huddersfield Town	Villa Park
	Dai Astley (3); Eric Houghton	Report

26 December 1935	Huddersfield Town	4–1	Aston Villa	Leeds Road
		Report	Ronnie Dix

28 December 1935	Sheffield Wednesday	5–2	Aston Villa	Hillsborough
		Report	Eric Houghton 2'; Jackie Williams 20'

1 January 1936	Sunderland	1–3	Aston Villa	Roker Park
		Report	Ronnie Dix 32'; Alex Massie

4 January 1936	Aston Villa	4–2	Portsmouth	Villa Park
	Dai Astley 5'; Dai Astley 13'; Eric Houghton 64'; Eric Houghton 85'	Report

18 January 1936	Preston North End	3–0	Aston Villa	Deepdale
		Report

25 January 1936	Aston Villa	2–2	Brentford	Villa Park
	Jackie Williams 26'	Report

1 February 1936	Derby County	1–3	Aston Villa	Baseball Ground
		Report	Charlie Phillips 20'; Jackie Williams 35'; Dai Astley 71'

8 February 1936	Aston Villa	1–1	Everton	Villa Park
	Dai Astley 44'	Report

15 February 1936	Bolton Wanderers	4–3	Aston Villa	Burnden Park
		Report	Gordon Hodgson 6'; Dai Astley 68'; Eric Houghton 88'

29 February 1936	Aston Villa	3–0	Liverpool	Villa Park
	Gordon Hodgson 10'; John Maund 49'; Dai Astley 57'	Report

7 March 1936	Stoke City	2–3	Aston Villa	Victoria Ground
		Report	Dai Astley 6'; Dai Astley 8'; Charlie Phillips 44'

14 March 1936	Aston Villa	3–3	Leeds United	Villa Park
	Dai Astley 9'; Alex Massie 23'; John Maund 83'	Report

21 March 1936	Chelsea	1–0	Aston Villa	Stamford Bridge
		Report

28 March 1936	Aston Villa	2–1	Birmingham	Villa Park
	Frank Broome 58'; Frank Broome 69'	Report
Note: In the Second City derby Villa held Birmingham to a draw at St Andrews before beating them 2–1 at Villa Park.

1 April 1936	West Bromwich Albion	0–3	Aston Villa	The Hawthorns
		Report	Dai Astley 35'; Frank Broome 80'; Frank Broome 84'

4 April 1936	Grimsby Town	4–1	Aston Villa	Blundell Park
		Report	Frank Broome 40'

10 April 1936	Aston Villa	4–2	Wolverhampton Wanderers	Villa Park
	Eric Houghton 2'; Frank Broome 9'; Frank Broome 59'; Dai Astley 74'	Report

11 April 1936	Aston Villa	2–2	Manchester City	Villa Park
	Eric Houghton 11'; Gordon Hodgson 12'	Report

13 April 1936	Wolverhampton Wanderers	2–2	Aston Villa	Molineux
	Gordon Hodgson; Eric Houghton 44'	Report

18 April 1936	Arsenal	1–0	Aston Villa	Highbury
		Report

25 April 1936	Aston Villa	2–4	Blackburn Rovers	Villa Park
	Frank Broome 33'; Eric Houghton (pen) 52'	Report

Source: avfchistory.co.uk

== FA Cup ==
The 44 First and Second Division clubs entered the competition at the Third round along with Stockport County, Millwall and Luton Town.

The matches were scheduled for Saturday, 11 January 1936.

Tie no	Home team	Score	Away team	Date
11	Aston Villa	0–1	Huddersfield Town	11 January 1936

== See also ==
- List of Aston Villa F.C. records and statistics
