= Football specials =

Trains arranged to transport football supporters

Football specials are chartered or specially scheduled trains arranged to transport football supporters, typically to away fixtures or major finals. The term is most commonly used in the United Kingdom, but special services for match-going crowds have historically been operated elsewhere.

== Background ==
Special trains for football crowds were used in Britain from at least the late 19th century, as railways enabled large numbers of supporters to travel to major cup ties. By the 1970s, violence and vandalism associated with matchday travel contributed to a decline in the operation of football specials on the British network.

== United Kingdom ==
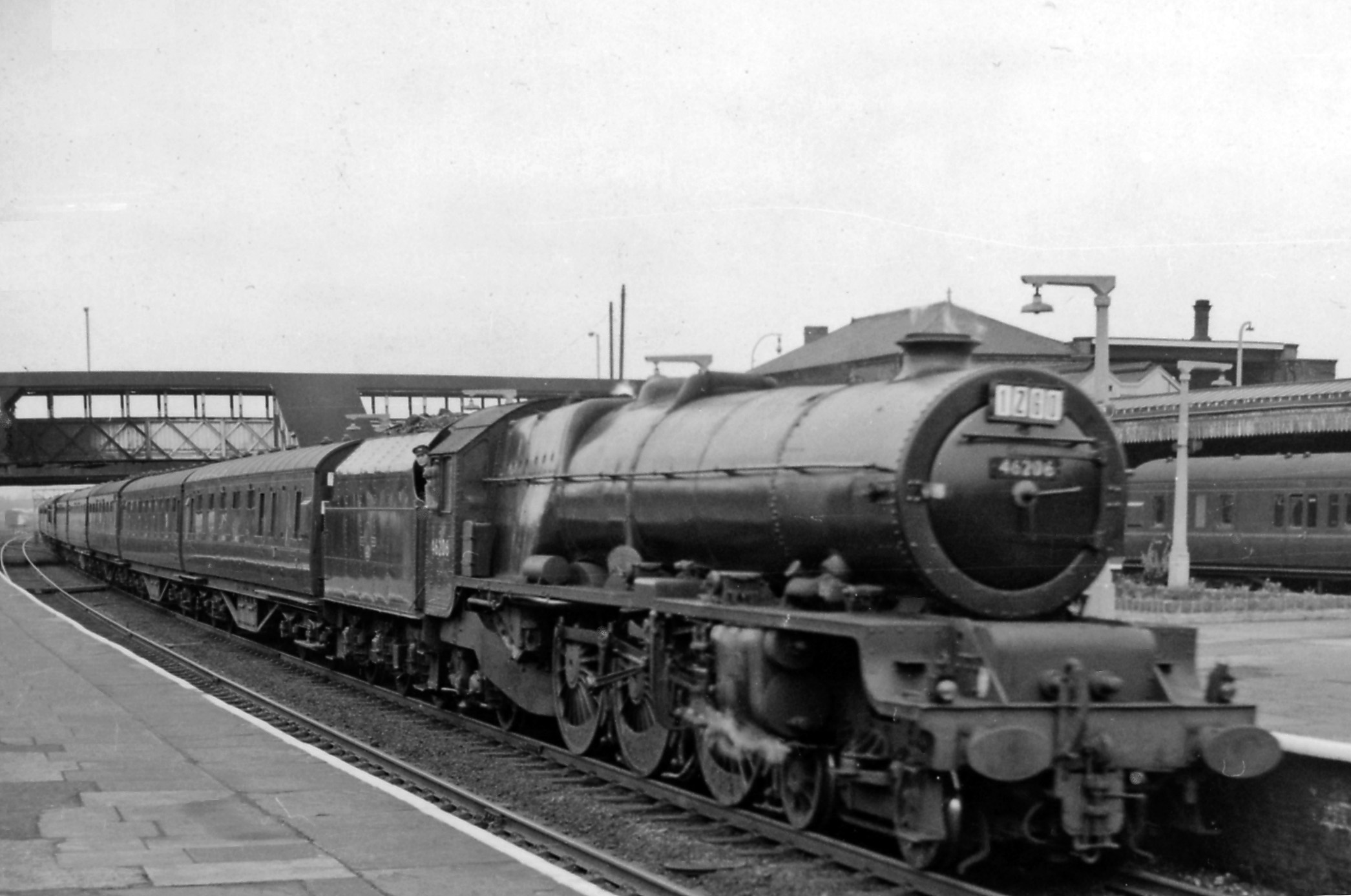
A British Rail Football special train at Willesden Junction station in 1962

Football specials had run as early as 1927, when the Great Western Railway ran 50 services from Wales to London for the 1927 FA Cup Final at Wembley Stadium.

=== 1970s and 1980s ===
During the peak of football hooliganism in the 1970s and 1980s, football specials were chartered to ferry fans to away games. However these were only popular during weekends. Many mid-week trains would have been cancelled. One famous example of this was in 1975 when Liverpool arranged for five 'specials' to be put on by railway services for a game against West Ham United; however only one left the station.

The Inter City Firm that follows West Ham United, was named after the InterCity trains they travelled on. The firm following Leeds United, the Leeds Service Crew, named themselves after the regular services they travelled on due to them being less heavily policed than football specials.

=== 1990s to present ===
When Wembley Stadium was closed for rebuilding from 2001 until 2006, and the FA Cup held at the Millennium Stadium, football specials ran.

At a transport security conference in London on 14 February 2007, the deputy head of British Transport Police, Deputy Chief Constable, Andy Trotter, warned that fans were disrupting trains. Trotter said his resources were "being stretched by the pressure of herding growing numbers of fans around the country on match days. Even when services to match day hotspots such as London, Manchester and Liverpool pass off without arrests, non-football going passengers can be frightened or irritated by fans' behaviour". Adding that, "There is an argument for the football specials, the trains that take fans backwards and forwards, but that's a matter for the train operators." He said he would like to see fans taken off trains, "I would much prefer if there is something done not to have them coming on the system at all."

British Transport Police welcome their return, a spokesperson saying "it gives us the chance to isolate the fans from other passengers".

Virgin Trains West Coast, whose InterCity West Coast franchise service covered 16 clubs, said reviving charted trains was hampered by a lack of spare carriages, unlike in British Rail days when there was spare and redundant stock. Great North Eastern Railway (GNER), which carried fans between London, Leeds and North East England, used Middlesbrough stewards to help prevent trouble. GNER said that train timetables were specified by government and did not allow charters.

The Football Supporters' Federation, said bringing back football specials was the right idea for the wrong reason. "If there was enough demand for a football special and it could be run at a certain time I think a lot of people would be happy with that. But we don't accept that a lot of football fans who go on trains are hooligans."

Arsenal and Chelsea sometimes organise charter trains. These are operated with hired in sets from spot hire companies Riviera Trains and West Coast Railways.

Football specials operate to Rugby League and Rugby Union matches at Wembley Stadium and the Millennium Stadium.

== Outside the United Kingdom ==
=== Australia ===
Australian newspapers used the term "football special train" for rail services operated for match crowds in the early 20th century.

=== Scotland ===
Rail operators have also scheduled additional services and capacity for international fixtures and major matches, for example extra services for games at Hampden Park.
