= Tommy Bisset =

English footballer (1932–2011)

Personal information
- Full name: Thomas Alexander Bisset
- Date of birth: 21 March 1932
- Place of birth: Croydon, England
- Date of death: 30 April 2011 (aged 79)
- Place of death: Dumfries, Scotland
- Height: 6 ft 0 in (1.83 m)
- Positions: Right back; forward

Senior career*
Years	Team	Apps	(Gls)
19??–1952	Redhill		
1952–1961	Brighton & Hove Albion	115	(5)
1961–196?	Guildford City		
- Yiewsley
- Haywards Heath
- Southwick
- * Club domestic league appearances and goals

Thomas Alexander Bisset (21 March 1932 – 30 April 2011) was an English professional footballer who made 115 Football League appearances playing as a forward or right back for Brighton & Hove Albion.

== Life and career ==
Bisset was born in Croydon, Surrey. After completing his National Service obligations – while serving with the Royal Signals in Eritrea, he played football for the Eritrean League against the Sudan national team – he joined Redhill of the Athenian League before signing for Brighton & Hove Albion in late 1952. He played little for his first two-and-a-half seasons, then – converted from forward to right back – missed only three matches in the 1955–56 campaign, before returning to the reserves for another two years. Having made little contribution to the team's promotion from the Third Division South, he made more than 50 appearances in Brighton's first two seasons in the Second Division, before returning to the reserves again before his release in 1961. He then moved into non-league football with Guildford City and Yiewsley of the Southern League and then Sussex County League clubs Haywards Heath Town (as player-coach) and Southwick.

Bisset died in Dumfries, Scotland on 30 April 2011, at the age of 79.
