= 1946–47 Walsall F.C. season =

Walsall
1946–47 season
- Manager: Harry Hibbs
- Stadium: Fellows Park
- Third Division South: 5th (46 Points)
- FA Cup: Third Round
Home colours

During the 1946–47 season Walsall competed in the Football League Third Division South where they finished in 5th position with 46 points.

== Final league table ==
=== Third Division South ===
Pos	Team	Pld	W	D	L	GF	GA	GAv	Pts
3	Bristol City	42	20	11	11	94	56	1.679	51
4	Swindon Town	42	19	11	12	84	73	1.151	49
5	Walsall	42	17	12	13	74	59	1.254	46
6	Ipswich Town	42	16	14	12	61	53	1.151	46
7	Bournemouth & Boscombe Athletic	42	18	8	16	72	54	1.333	44

== Results ==
=== Legend ===
Win	Draw	Loss

=== Football League Third Division South ===
31 August 1946 1	Southend United	3–1	Walsall	Southend-on-Sea

4 September 1946 2	Torquay United	2–0	Walsall	Plainmoor

7 September 1946 3	Walsall	0–2	Queens Park Rangers	Fellows Park

9 September 1946 4	Walsall	0–0	Mansfield Town	Fellows Park

14 September 1946 5	Leyton Orient	1–0	Walsall	Brisbane Road

18 September 1946 6	Mansfield Town	1–1	Walsall	Field Mill

21 September 1946 7	Walsall	4–2	Ipswich Town	Fellows Park

28 September 1946 8	Watford	0–2	Walsall	Vicarage Road

5 October 1946 9	Walsall	2–0	Northampton Town	Fellows Park

12 October 1946 10	Walsall	2–2	Reading	Fellows Park

19 October 1946 11	Aldershot	1–2	Walsall	Recreation Ground

26 October 1946 12	Walsall	1–1	Brighton & Hove Albion	Fellows Park

2 November 1946 13	Exeter City	2–2	Walsall	St James Park

9 November 1946 14	Walsall	4–1	Port Vale	Fellows Park

16 November 1946 15	Bristol City	1–2	Walsall	Ashton Gate Stadium

23 November 1946 16	Walsall	0–1	Swindon Town	Fellows Park

7 December 1946 17	Walsall	2–3	Cardiff City	Fellows Park

21 December 1946 18	Walsall	2–0	Notts County	Fellows Park

25 December 1946 19	Bristol Rovers	2–2	Walsall	Eastville Stadium

26 December 1946 20	Walsall	2–0	Bristol Rovers	Fellows Park

28 December 1946 21	Walsall	2–2	Southend United	Fellows Park

4 January 1947 22	Queens Park Rangers	1–0	Walsall	Loftus Road

15 January 1947 23	Bournemouth & Boscombe Athletic	2–3	Walsall	Dean Court

18 January 1947 24	Walsall	3–1	Leyton Orient	Fellows Park

25 January 1947 25	Ipswich Town	2–1	Walsall	Portman Road

1 February 1947 26	Walsall	1–3	Watford	Fellows Park

1 March 1947 27	Brighton & Hove Albion	2–0	Walsall	Goldstone Ground

15 March 1947 28	Port Vale	2–2	Walsall	The Old Recreation Ground

22 March 1947 29	Walsall	3–0	Bristol City	Fellows Park

29 March 1947 30	Swindon Town	4–1	Walsall	County Ground

4 April 1947 31	Crystal Palace	1–1	Walsall	Selhurst Park

5 April 1947 32	Walsall	3–0	Bournemouth & Boscombe Athletic	Fellows Park

7 April 1947 33	Walsall	3–3	Crystal Palace	Fellows Park

8 April 1947 34	Northampton Town	0–8	Walsall	County Ground

12 April 1947 35	Cardiff City	3–0	Walsall	Ninian Park

19 April 1947 36	Walsall	2–2	Norwich City	Fellows Park

26 April 1947 37	Notts County	3–1	Walsall	Meadow Lane

10 May 1947 38	Walsall	2–0	Aldershot	Fellows Park

17 May 1947 39	Norwich City	0–2	Walsall	Carrow Road

24 May 1947 40	Walsall	2–1	Exeter City	Carrow Road

26 May 1947 41	Reading	1–1	Walsall	Elm Park

31 May 1947 42	Walsall	2–1	Torquay United	Fellows Park

=== FA Cup ===
30 November 1946 Round 1	Leytonstone	1–6	Walsall	Leytonstone

14 December 1946 Round 2	Walsall	0–0	Ipswich Town	Fellows Park

18 December 1946 Replay	Ipswich Town	0–1	Walsall	Portman Road

11 January 1947 Round 3	Walsall	2–5	Liverpool	Fellows Park
