= Fred Goss (footballer) =

English footballer (1914–1983)

Personal information
- Full name: Frederick Charles Goss
- Date of birth: 25 May 1914
- Place of birth: Ilkeston, England
- Date of death: 1983 (aged 68–69)
- Position: Outside right

Senior career*
Years	Team	Apps	(Gls)
- Ilkeston St. Clare's
	Ilkeston Town	0	(0)
1934–1936	Aston Villa	2	(0)
1936–1937	Wrexham	9	(1)
- * Club domestic league appearances and goals

Frederick Charles Goss (25 May 1914 – 1983) was an English professional footballer who played as an outside right. He made appearances in the English Football League with Aston Villa and Wrexham.

In June 1941 Goss played at the St Andrew's ground, Derby in aid of the Mayoress of Derby's YMCA Hut Fund. London, Midland and Scottish Railway's Locomotive Dept faced the Carriage & Wagon Dept.
