= Andrew Kerr (civil servant) =

Andrew Kerr OBE was a local government officer who has was Chief Executive of several principal councils. He was with the City of Edinburgh Council from August 2015 to June 2024.

== Early life ==
A native of Falkirk, in his youth Kerr was an international sprinter. He won a bronze medal at 400m in the 1977 European Athletics Junior Championships.

== Local government career ==
He worked for Birmingham Council for three years before becoming Chief Executive successively of North Tyneside Council (2005) and Wiltshire Council (2010), then Chief Operating Officer of the City of Cardiff Council in March 2012, and Chief Executive of Cornwall Council in 2013 before his next move, to Edinburgh.

=== Wiltshire Council ===
Kerr was appointed to the Wiltshire job in January 2010, and in May 2011 he made headlines with an increase to his £189,000 salary while the Council was cutting hundreds of jobs. While initially defending his pay rise, after media and political pressure he decided to turn down the increase. However, in October 2011 he was made redundant, with council leader Jane Scott commenting "This is an organisation which is led by politicians, not by officers, and that is what we are talking about here.”

=== Cardiff Council ===
In April 2012 Kerr began a new job at Cardiff.

=== Cornwall Council ===
In October 2013, he was appointed as Chief Executive in Cornwall, but Mebyon Kernow was against the appointment, describing Kerr as "too transient... The man seems to flip from job to job every 18 months". In November 2014 he controversially called for the resignation of a Liberal Democrat councillor, with one political commentator observing "For an unelected Chief Executive to demand without explanation the resignation of a democratically elected councillor should be a scandal." In May 2015 Kerr himself resigned, to take up the equivalent job in Edinburgh, with a Cornwall cabinet member stating that the resignation came completely out of the blue. Shortly after arriving in Edinburgh, Kerr was reported in the Edinburgh News as saying that he was "here to stay".

=== Edinburgh Council ===
In September 2016, Kerr told The Times that he was spearheading a 2050 Edinburgh City Vision in an attempt to identify a "North Star", as without that guiding light "any plans get shaky". The vision was one for a city of enlightenment and empty bins.

In June 2017, Kerr told The Edinburgh Reporter that he welcomed the SNP-Labour coalition which had just retained control of the city council.

== Controversies ==
=== Child Abuse in social care ===
Edinburgh Council's failure to fully investigate a care scandal in 2017 put more children at risk, according to the Children’s Commissioner for Scotland Bruce Adamson. Edinburgh Council’s chief executive Andrew Kerr ordered an independent investigation into secure care services in 2017 after a review into Gordon Collins, a care worker, was convicted of sexually abusing children at two homes, but the inquiry did not go ahead. A full investigation was eventually ordered in 2020 and an excoriating but still secret report details a toxic management culture and alarming allegations of physical abuse. The council had ordered an inquiry after the review into how Collins groomed and abused children at two homes, in 2017 but, Adamson said, the failure to commission an independent investigation meant more children were “subject to unacceptable and unlawful conduct”.

=== Expenses scandal ===
In April 2017, The Sunday Post reported that Kerr had taken a flight to a property investment conference in Cannes at a cost of £4,000 on the day that news broke of five hundred council staff agreeing to take voluntary redundancy to cut costs.

== Personal life ==
On 9 December 2017 he joined Bob Geldof and others at Sleep in the Park, a publicity stunt in which they slept the night in Princes Street Gardens to the music of Liam Gallagher, Deacon Blue, and Frightened Rabbit, to help the homeless.
