= Billy Evans (footballer, born 1921) =

English footballer

Personal information
- Full name: William Emmanuel Evans
- Date of birth: 5 September 1921
- Place of birth: Birmingham, England
- Date of death: 26 July 1960 (aged 38)
- Place of death: Grimsby, England
- Position: Inside forward

Senior career*
Years	Team	Apps	(Gls)
1946–1949	Aston Villa	7	(3)
1949–1953	Notts County	96	(14)
1953–1955	Gillingham	89	(12)
1955–?	Grimsby Town	102	(28)
Total		294	(57)
- * Club domestic league appearances and goals

William Emmanuel Evans (5 September 1921 – 26 July 1960) was an English professional footballer who played as an inside forward. He died of lung cancer in Grimsby in 1960, aged 38.
