= Andy Kerr (environmentalist) =

American environmentalist

Andy Kerr (born May 29, 1955) is an American conservation advocate, consultant, lobbyist, lecturer, and writer. He has worked to protect northern spotted owl habitat, secure water for fish in the Klamath Basin, and establish wilderness areas like Steens Mountain. Kerr was involved with the Oregon Natural Resources Council (now Oregon Wild) in the 1970s and the Wilderness Society in 2000. The Oregonian called him Oregon's most prominent environmentalist during the northern spotted owl controversy.[1] He also unsuccessfully advocated for population control measures.

== Personal life ==
Kerr is a fifth-generation Oregonian from Creswell, he now lives in Ashland and Washington, D.C. In the 1990s, his purchase of a log house in Eastern Oregon stirred controversy given his anti-logging stance.

Kerr married Nancy Peterson and was engaged in 2009 to Randi Spivak of the Center for Biological Diversity.

== Bibliography ==
- Oregon Desert Guide: 70 Hikes, The Mountaineers Books, 2000
- Oregon Wild: Endangered Forest Wilderness, Timber Press, 2004
