= Matt Moralee =

English footballer

Personal information
- Full name: Matthew Whitfield Moralee
- Date of birth: 1878
- Place of birth: Newcastle upon Tyne, England
- Date of death: 1962 (aged 84)
- Place of death: Doncaster, England
- Position: Half back

Senior career*
Years	Team	Apps	(Gls)
1901−1904	The Wednesday	4	(1)
1904−1906	Doncaster Rovers		(3)
1906−?	Mexborough Town		
- * Club domestic league appearances and goals

Matthew Whitfield Moralee (1878–1962) was an English footballer who played as a half back for The Wednesday, Doncaster Rovers and Mexborough Town from 1902.

Born in Newcastle upon Tyne, by 1901 he was living in Sheffield where he played for Division 1 side The Wednesday, who would later change their name to Sheffield Wednesday. Moralee was seen as being part of the "rare talent" of the reserve team though in a team that were Division 1 Champions in 1902−03 and 1903−04, he went on to only make a handful of first team appearances.

For the 1904−05 season, he moved to play for Doncaster Rovers who had just been voted into Division 2 and who went on to have the joint worst season in English Football League history, ending up bottom with just 8 points from 34 games and failing to be re-elected. Moralee scored in 1 of his 32 League games for Doncaster in that season, and once in 2 FA Cup games. The following season he scored 3 times, all from the penalty spot. In 1906 he moved to play for Mexborough who were also in the Midland League.

He and his wife Isabella had seven children, one of whom was also called Matt Moralee who played for Gainsborough Trinity, Grimsby Town, Aston Villa and Leicester City between the wars. Matt Moralee (senior) died in Doncaster in 1962.
