= Andy Kerr (footballer, born 1917) =

English footballer (1915–1979)

Andy Kerr (1915–1979) was an English professional footballer. He played for Aston Villa during his professional career.

== Career ==
In July 1936, Aston Villa signed the 18-year-old as a youth player. Kerr made his debut in the opening match of the 1936–37 season. He played his last pre-war match against Leeds United on 22 April 1939.

Kerr's career was interrupted by the outbreak of World War II. In September 1939, he was unfit and did not play in Villa's last pre-war game, a 1–0 defeat at Derby County. On 4th September, the government announced a ban on sport to prevent crowds gathering. Villa's League match away to Wolves was one of over thirty mid-week League fixtures called-off.

Villa Park found itself in an evacuation district designated under the British Government's civilian evacuation scheme. The Police Chief Constable of Birmingham, C.C.H Moriarty, intimated that he would not sanction football matches within the city of Birmingham. The Football League's Scheme for War-time football proposed to limit gates to 8,000 in evacuation areas.

With their large overheads, the directors of Aston Villa and Sunderland announced their intention to close down. The manager and players were paid off whilst Villa Park was commandeered by the War Office. Villa's players quickly found war-time employment.

Initially, Kerr became a constable in Birmingham City Police; he subsequently served with the Royal Navy and did not participate in wartime football.

Kerr next played for Villa on 5 January 1946 in their first peacetime competitive game, a 1–2 loss to Coventry City in the first leg of the FA Cup.
