= Matt Moralee (footballer, born 1912) =

English footballer

Personal information
- Full name: Matthew Moralee
- Date of birth: 21 February 1912
- Place of birth: Barnburgh, Yorkshire, England
- Date of death: 1991 (aged 79)
- Place of death: Doncaster, England
- Height: 5 ft 10 in (1.78 m)
- Position: Inside forward

Senior career*
Years	Team	Apps	(Gls)
- Ormsby United
- Denaby United
−1934?	Gainsborough Trinity		
1934?−1936	Grimsby Town		(3?)
1936−1937	Aston Villa	12	(1)
1937−1939	Leicester City	38	(6)
- * Club domestic league appearances and goals

Matthew Moralee (21 February 1912−1991) was an English footballer who played as an inside forward in the Football League between the wars.

Born in Barnburgh, near Doncaster, he played for Ormsby United before going to Denaby United, Gainsborough Trinity and Grimsby Town.

Moralee arrived at Division 1 side Aston Villa in October 1936 where he played in 12 games scoring one goal.

In November 1937, he moved to Leicester City who had just been promoted to Division 1. Scoring 6 goals, he played in 43 league and cup matches for them before the outbreak of the war.

He was the son of The Wednesday and Doncaster Rovers player, also called Matt Moralee.
