= Freddie Haycock =

English footballer

Personal information
- Full name: Frederick James Haycock
- Date of birth: 19 April 1912
- Place of birth: Bootle, Liverpool, England
- Date of death: 10 April 1989 (aged 76)
- Place of death: Birmingham, England
- Height: 5 ft 8 in (1.73 m)
- Position: Forward

Senior career*
Years	Team	Apps	(Gls)
- Waterford
- Blackburn Rovers
- Prescot Cables
1934–1945	Aston Villa	99	(28)
1946–1947	Wrexham	6	(1)
- Hednesford Town

International career
1934–1935	League of Ireland XI	1	(0)
- * Club domestic league appearances and goals

Frederick James Haycock (19 April 1912 – 10 April 1989) was an English footballer, who played as a forward.

Haycock started his career at Waterford, where he earned a cap in the League of Ireland XI. He then moved around, before ending up at Aston Villa.

== Aston Villa ==
Freddie Haycock made his debut in the 1936-37 season. He made 99 league appearances for Villa.

Haycock's career was interrupted by the outbreak of World War II. In September 1939, he had sustained a knee injury prior to Villa's last pre-war game, a 1–0 defeat at Derby County. On 4th September the Government announced a ban on Sport to prevent crowds gathering. Villa's League match away to Wolves was one of over thirty mid-week League fixtures called-off. Villa Park found itself in an evacuation district designated under the British Government's civilian evacuation scheme. The Police Chief Constable of Birmingham, C.C.H Moriarty, intimated that he would not sanction football matches within the city of Birmingham. The Football League's Scheme for War-time football proposed to limit gates to 8,000 in evacuation areas. With their large overheads, the directors of Aston Villa and Sunderland announced their intention to close down. The manager and players were paid off whilst Villa Park was commandeered by the War Office.

Villa's players quickly found war-time employment. During World War II, Haycock guested for many clubs, including Liverpool, Leicester and Wolverhampton Wanderers.

== Wrexham ==
After the war, Haycock moved to Wrexham, appearing six times for the Welsh club.
