= Jimmy Hogan =

English football coach (1882–1974)

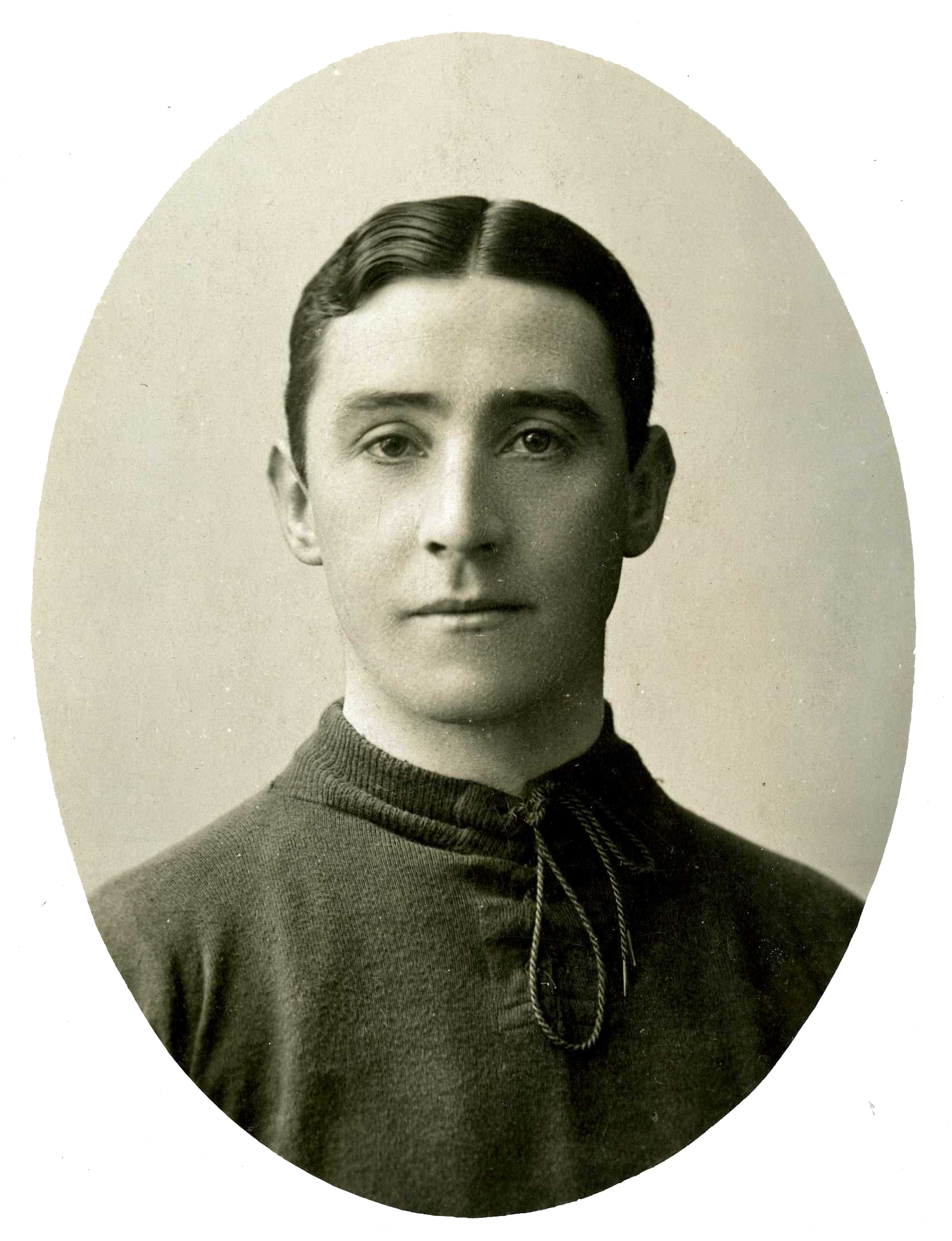
- Hogan in 1908

Personal information
- Full name: James Hogan
- Date of birth: 16 October 1882
- Place of birth: Nelson, England
- Date of death: 30 January 1974 (aged 91)
- Place of death: Burnley, England
- Position: Inside forward

Senior career*
Years	Team	Apps	(Gls)
1902–1903	Rochdale Town	?	(?)
1903–1905	Burnley	50	(12)
1905	Nelson	?	(?)
1905–1908	Fulham	18	(5)
1908	Swindon Town	9	(9)
1908–1913	Bolton Wanderers	54	(18)
Total		131	(44)

Managerial career
- 1910–1912: FC Dordrecht
- 1910: Netherlands
- 1911–1912: Wiener Amateur-SV
- 1914–1921: MTK Budapest
- 1918–1920: Young Boys Bern
- 1924: Switzerland
- 1925: Lausanne Sports
- Dresdner SC
- 1925–1927: MTK Budapest
- 1932–1933: Racing Club de Paris
- 1933–1934: Lausanne Sports
- 1934–1935: Fulham
- 1936: Austria
- 1936–1939: Aston Villa
Medal record
Men's football
Representing Austria (as manager)
Olympic Games
Silver medal – second place	1936 Berlin	Men's competition
- * Club domestic league appearances and goals

James Hogan (16 October 1882 – 30 January 1974) was an English football player and coach. He enjoyed some success as a footballer, reaching an FA Cup semi-final with Fulham in 1907–08, but his primary legacy is as a pioneer of the game and as an innovative coach across multiple European club and national sides. Named "the most influential coach there has ever been" by Jonathan Wilson, Hogan is regarded by some as the architect of Total Football.

== Early life ==
James Hogan was born in 1882 into an Irish Catholic family in Nelson, Lancashire, the son of mill worker James Hogan. He grew up in nearby Burnley and received his education at St Mary Magdalene Roman Catholic School in Burnley. His father wanted Hogan to enter priesthood and sent him to study as a boarder at the Salford Diocesan Junior Seminary St Bede's College, Manchester in September 1896. Hogan graduated at midsummer 1900 after deciding not to pursue his vocation any further, although he was College Head Boy in the 1899–1900 Academic Year.

== Playing career ==
Hogan was a promising young inside forward, and in 1903, he was the first signing of Burnley's new secretary-manager, Spen Whittaker. Despite being a first team regular, he felt undervalued and in 1905, he asked to be paid the maximum wage, which was £4 a week. The club turned it down, so he left and joined Fulham. Hogan helped Fulham reach the FA Cup semi-final in 1907–08 before joining Swindon Town and then Bolton Wanderers. During a pre-season tour Bolton beat Dutch club FC Dordrecht 10–0; Hogan vowed to return to Dordrecht in order to "teach those fellows how to play properly".

== Coaching and managerial career ==
=== 1910–1920: The Netherlands, Austria and Hungary ===
In 1910, Hogan accepted a two-year contract at Dordrecht and set about improving the team in fitness and ball control, as well as implementing the Combination Game. Impressed by his methods, the Royal Dutch Football Association recruited Hogan to manage the Netherlands in a friendly against Germany in October 1910, which Hogan's side won 2–1. Due to his success Hogan also briefly coached Wiener Amateur-SV in 1911 and 1912. Upon the expiry of his contract with Dordrecht in 1912, Hogan returned for a final season as a player at Bolton before returning to Vienna to coach the Austria national football team. However, the outbreak of World War I meant that he was interned as a foreign prisoner of war, but was smuggled to the Hungarian border. He moved to Budapest, where he was allowed out of captivity to coach at MTK Budapest between 1914 and 1918. Hogan laid the foundations for MTK's domination of Hungarian football, as they won ten domestic titles in a row between 1913–14 and 1924–25.

In 1917 Hogan was allowed to go home to be reunited with his family, but found a sour reception. He was told that men who had suffered financially as a result of the war could claim £200 from the F.A. Hogan was almost destitute, but when he went to the FA the secretary, Francis Wall, opened a cupboard and offered him a pair of khaki socks. 'We sent these to the boys at the front and they were grateful.' The unsubtle message was: 'traitor'.

=== 1920s: Switzerland, France, Germany, Hungary and 1924 Olympics ===
At the end of the First World War in 1918, Hogan travelled to Switzerland and became coach of Young Boys Bern until 1920; he returned to Switzerland in 1924 to coach the Swiss national team alongside his compatriot Teddy Duckworth and Hungarian Izidor Kürschner for the 1924 Summer Olympics in Paris. Switzerland reached the final but lost 3–0 against Uruguay.

After the Olympics, Hogan coached Lausanne Sports and Dresdner SC before returning to Hungary to manage MTK Budapest again between 1925 and 1927. In 1926, Hogan was offered a lucrative contract by the Central German Football Association, after which he toured through Germany; Hogan is said to have shown his tactics to more than 5,000 German football players.

=== 1930–1936: Austria and the Wunderteam, France, Fulham, 1936 Olympics ===
Hogan next formed a partnership with Hugo Meisl in 1931, coaching the Austria national football team to success during its Wunderteam period when it was recognised as one of the best European teams. Between 1932 and 1934, Hogan managed Racing Club de Paris and Lausanne Sports once again before returning to England to manage Fulham from May 1934. However, the players were not ready for new methods and training routines, and Hogan was sacked after only 31 games whilst lying in a hospital bed, recovering from an appendicitis operation in March 1935.

Hogan was contacted by Meisl to help coach the Austria national team at the 1936 Summer Olympics, which was hosted by Germany. Hogan's team were initially defeated by Peru in the quarter-final (4–2), however, a controversial rematch was scheduled which the Austrians won by default as the Peruvians left Germany in protest. Austria reached the final but were beaten 2–1 by Italy after extra time.

=== 1936–1939: Aston Villa ===
Aston Villa appointed 54 year-old Hogan as their manager in November 1936, following the club's first ever relegation the previous season. Villa board member Frederick Rinder had witnessed Hogan leading Austria to the final of the 1936 Olympics and persuaded him to return to England. Arriving at Villa, Hogan outlined his philosophy: "I am a teacher and lover of constructive football with every pass, every kick, every movement an object." He won promotion back to the top flight and reached the FA Cup semi-final in 1937–38 – however, the outbreak of World War II meant that his players were paid off whilst Villa Park was commandeered by the War Office, and Hogan left before his managerial career at the club had chance to really take off.

=== Post-WW2: Brentford, Celtic and a return to Aston Villa ===
Hogan joined Brentford as coach in September 1948, before joining Celtic in the same year. Celtic's chairman Robert Kelly thought that the team's state of decline needed radical attention, and viewed Hogan as an experienced and innovative coach who was capable of reviving the struggling side. Celtic were at a low point and had avoided relegation in recent seasons. However, the majority of the players viewed Hogan's appointment with scepticism and, at times, mocked his methods. Celtic player Tommy Docherty, who later managed Scotland, Chelsea and Manchester United, credited his managerial success to the school of coaching he received from Hogan, and declared him to be "the finest coach the world had ever known". Docherty also stated: "He used to say football was like a Viennese waltz, a rhapsody. one-two-three, one-two-three, pass-move-pass, pass-move-pass. We were sat there, glued to our seats, because we were so keen to learn. His arrival at Celtic Park was the best thing that ever happened to me."

Hogan left Celtic by mutual consent in 1950, when Aston Villa asked him to return and take over from youth training and advise manager Eric Houghton. Villa won the 1956–57 FA Cup; Houghton and Hogan had laid the groundwork for Joe Mercer's side. Hogan's apprentices included future Aston Villa, West Brom and Manchester United manager Ron Atkinson, who stated: "Everything Hogan did was geared around ball control and passing. When Jimmy came to Villa, he was revolutionary. He would have you in the old car park at the back of Villa Park and he would be saying 'I want you to play the ball with the inside of your right foot, outside of your right foot, inside again, and now turn come back on your left foot inside and outside'. He would get you doing step-overs, little turns and twist on the ball and everything you did was to make you comfortable on the ball."

Hogan retired, aged 77, in November 1959, but continued to scout for both Villa and Burnley. He later returned to live in Burnley and attended several Burnley home games as a supporter.

== Death ==
Hogan died in 1974 whilst living with his sister's daughter Margaret Melia on Brunshaw Avenue, Burnley. He was buried with his sister, Ellen Melia and her husband Peter Melia, in Burnley cemetery. Margaret died in 1992 whereby she joined them in the same grave. The grave is located next to Jimmy's parents' grave, but does not have a headstone.

In 2021, Peter Briggs and his father Charles Briggs, both members of the Turf Moor Memorial Garden located Jimmy's grave and started fundraising to pay for a headstone. The project was financed by the Turf Moor Memorial Garden, Burnley Football Supporters' Club, the Burnley Former Players Association, Aston Villa, former Burnley directors Clive Holt, Martin Hobbs, Terry Crabb and Barry Kilby, along with Burnley director John Banaszkiewicz. Turf Moor Memorial Garden also mounted a plaque next to Turf Moor within their Memorial Garden.

== Impact and legacy ==
Hogan believed that possession-based football was the answer, but that it must be founded upon constant passing and movement, and added versatility in his players and increased fitness that would allow them to bamboozle an opponent with the fluidity of their attacking moves.

In 2012, Spanish magazine Panenka published a pedigree of several influential managers and teams from the 1910s to the 2010s—such as the Brazil national team of the 1950s and Pep Guardiola—placing Hogan as its progenitor; Hogan created a direct lineage for modern football tactics. Influenced by Burnley-born manager Harry Bradshaw and his adoption of the Scottish combination game, Hogan was directly responsible for the coaching foundations of two of the most influential footballing sides in history – Austria's Wunderteam and Hungary's Golden Team.

Hogan is credited with the revolution in European football that saw Hungary defeat England 6–3 at Wembley in 1953, ushering a new football era. After the match, Sándor Barcs, then president of the Hungarian Football Federation, said to the press: "Jimmy Hogan taught us everything we know about football."

Helmut Schön, 1974 FIFA World Cup-winning manager, whom Hogan lectured in Germany, stated: "I greatly admired Jimmy and always regarded him as a shining example of the coaching profession. In my lectures to coaches today I still mention his name frequently". Gusztáv Sebes stated: "We played football as Jimmy Hogan taught us. When our football history is told, his name should be written in gold letters". After his death in 1974, the head of the German Football Association labelled Hogan as "the father of football in modern Germany".

Hogan's unauthorised biography was written by Ashley Hyne in 2018 and entitled The Greatest Coach Ever? and was published by Electric Blue publishing.

== Honours ==
=== Player ===
Fulham

- Southern League: 1905–06, 1906–07

Bolton Wanderers

- Football League Second Division: 1908–09

=== Club ===
MTK Budapest

- Nemzeti Bajnokság I: 1916–17, 1917–18, 1918–19, 1919–20, 1920–21

Young Boys Bern

- Swiss Serie A: 1919–20

Aston Villa

- Football League Second Division: 1937–38

=== Individual ===
- World Soccer 24th Greatest Manager of All Time: 2013
