= Gordon Clayton (footballer, born 1910) =

English footballer

Personal information
- Full name: James Gordon Thomas Clayton
- Date of birth: 19 July 1910
- Place of birth: Sunderland, England
- Date of death: 1976 (aged 65–66)
- Position: Centre forward

Youth career
- Shotton Colliery

Senior career*
Years	Team	Apps	(Gls)
1932–1937	Wolverhampton Wanderers	47	(34)
1937–1938	Aston Villa	11	(1)
1938–1940	Burnley	16	(10)
- * Club domestic league appearances and goals

James Gordon Thomas Clayton (9 July 1910 – 1976) was an English professional footballer who played as a centre forward for Wolverhampton Wanderers, Aston Villa and Burnley.

== Career ==
Clayton joined Wolverhampton Wanderers in October 1932 from Shotton Colliery in October 1932, later making his debut on 21 April 1934 in a 1–5 loss at Newcastle United. He made only a handful of appearances over the following seasons until the 1936–37 season when he enjoyed an established run in the team, scoring 29 times, as the club finished fifth in the First Division.

After making a bright start to the following season, he was purchased by Aston Villa in October 1937. He immediately helped them win the Second Division championship but stayed only 12 months before joining Burnley in October 1938.

He retired in 1945 after having guested for Swansea City during World War II.
