= Ronnie Dix =

English footballer (1912–1998)

Personal information
- Full name: Ronald William Dix
- Date of birth: 12 September 1912
- Place of birth: Bristol, England
- Date of death: 2 April 1998 (aged 85)
- Place of death: Bristol, England
- Height: 5 ft 8 in (1.73 m)
- Position: Striker

Senior career*
Years	Team	Apps	(Gls)
1928–1932	Bristol Rovers	100	(33)
1932–1933	Blackburn Rovers		
1933–1937	Aston Villa	97	(30)
1937–1939	Derby County	94	(35)
1939–1947	Tottenham Hotspur		
1947–1949	Reading		

International career
1938	England	1	(1)
- * Club domestic league appearances and goals

Ronald William Dix (12 September 1912 – 2 April 1998) was a professional footballer, who holds the record for being the youngest goalscorer in Football League history, when he scored for Bristol Rovers aged 15 years 180 days in 1928.

He won one full international cap for England, scoring against Norway.

During World War II, Dix guested for clubs including Bristol City, Chester, Blackpool, Bradford Park Avenue, Wrexham, York City and Liverpool. He retired from playing in 1949 and died in April 1998 at the age of 85.

== Sources ==
- Byrne, Stephen; Jay, Mike (2003). Bristol Rovers Football Club - The Definitive History 1883-2003. Stroud: Tempus. ISBN 0-7524-2717-2.
- Davies, Gareth M; Jones, Peter (1999). The Racecourse Robins. Davies and Jones. ISBN 0-9524950-1-5.
