= Ronnie Starling =

English footballer

Personal information
- Full name: Ronald William Starling
- Date of birth: 11 October 1909
- Place of birth: Pelaw, County Durham, England
- Date of death: 17 December 1991 (aged 82)
- Place of death: Sheffield, England
- Height: 5 ft 9 1/2 in (1.77 m)
- Position: Inside forward

Youth career
- –1926: Washington Colliery

Senior career*
Years	Team	Apps	(Gls)
1927–1930	Hull City	78	(13)
1930–1932	Newcastle United	51	(8)
1932–1937	Sheffield Wednesday	176	(31)
1937–1948	Aston Villa	88	(11)

International career
1933–1937	England	2	(0)
- * Club domestic league appearances and goals

Ronald William Starling (11 October 1909 – 17 December 1991) was an English footballer whose career lasted from 1926 to 1946. Starling was an inside forward who made 413 appearances in all competitions, never a high scoring inside forward he was a player who created chances for other players, notching a modest 65 goals throughout his career. His ball carrying ability earned him the nickname of "The Man with the Fluttering Feet".

== Playing career ==
Born in Pelaw, County Durham, Ronnie Starling represented Durham County schools as a youth and began working in the coal mines in the north-east at the age of 14, firstly at Usworth colliery and then Washington Colliery. He was spotted by Hull City manager Billy McCracken while playing amateur football for Washington Colliery and signed for the Yorkshire club in October 1926 at the age of 17.

=== Hull City ===
Starling initially worked in the club offices whilst playing for the club as an amateur. He was part of the side which reached the FA Cup semi-final in the 1929–30 season, losing to Arsenal after a replay. Despite their good cup form that season the team struggled in Division Two and were heading for relegation when soon after the semi-final he returned to his native North-East with a £3,750 move to Newcastle United in May 1930.

=== Newcastle United ===
Starling was a regular in the Newcastle team in his first season at St James' Park (1930–31) making 38 appearances however the following campaign he only made 15 appearances losing his place in the side before Christmas to new signing Harry McMenemy. He took no part all in Newcastle's FA Cup run which saw the team beat Arsenal 2–1 in the final and on 25 June 1932 he signed for Sheffield Wednesday in a £3,250 deal.

=== Sheffield Wednesday ===
Starling was signed by Bob Brown but within a year Billy Walker was in charge. Walker made Starling club captain and played him in a central midfield role prompting him to produce the best football of his career. He played for The Owls for four-and-a-half years, as Wednesday finished third in Division One two seasons running and captained their 1935 FA Cup-winning team. He also played as Wednesday won the 1935 FA Charity Shield. In April 1933, he won his first England cap, playing as inside right in the 2–1 defeat by Scotland. As Wednesday struggled near the bottom of Division One, Starling joined Aston Villa for £6,900 on 6 January 1937, just a day after they had rejected a huge bid for Jackie Robinson from Arsenal. In total he played 176 league matches for Wednesday scoring 31 goals, and appeared in 17 FA Cup matches without scoring.

=== Aston Villa ===
Starling was a prominent member of Villa's 1937–38 side which won promotion to Division One. During his time with Villa he made his second England appearance on 17 April 1937, also against Scotland, as inside left in the 3–1 defeat.

In his one season at Villa Park, he scored fourteen goals in 29 league appearances. Starling's career was interrupted by the outbreak of World War II. In September 1939, he played in Aston Villa's last pre-war game, a 1–0 defeat at Derby County. On 4th September the Government announced a ban on Sport to prevent crowds gathering. Villa's League match away to Wolves was one of over thirty mid-week League fixtures called-off. Villa Park found itself in an evacuation district designated under the British Government's civilian evacuation scheme. The Police Chief Constable of Birmingham, Cecil Moriarty, intimated that he would not sanction football matches within the city of Birmingham. The Football League's Scheme for War-time football proposed to limit gates to 8,000 in evacuation areas. With their large overheads, the directors of Aston Villa and Sunderland announced their intention to close down. The manager and players were paid off whilst Villa Park was commandeered by the War Office. Villa's players quickly found war-time employment. Starling became a constable in Birmingham City Police.

Starling remained in contract with Aston Villa throughout World War II winning the Football League North in 1944, although he did make guest appearances for Northampton Town, Walsall and Sheffield Wednesday during the conflict. After the war he made single appearances in the League and FA Cup in 1946 before losing his place in the team and finally retiring in 1948, aged 39.

=== Retirement ===
After retiring as a player, he spent time as a coach with Nottingham Forest before retiring from football altogether, becoming a newsagent, with a shop on Middlewood Road near to Sheffield Wednesday's Hillsborough ground.

Sheffield Wednesday won the 1991 Football League Cup Final, Wednesday's first trophy since Ronnie Starling lifted the FA Cup in 1935. Starling was photographed for the Sheffield Star newspaper with the trophy and Wednesday players shortly before his death on 17 December 1991, aged 82.

== Honours ==
Sheffield Wednesday

- FA Cup: 1934–35
