= Eric Houghton =

English footballer (1910–1996)

- Houghton in 1932

Personal information
- Full name: William Eric Houghton
- Date of birth: 29 June 1910
- Place of birth: Billingborough, Lincolnshire, England
- Date of death: 1 May 1996 (aged 85)
- Place of death: Sutton Coldfield, Birmingham, England
- Height: 5 ft 8 in (1.73 m)
- Position: Winger

Youth career
- Billingborough

Senior career*
Years	Team	Apps	(Gls)
1927–1946	Aston Villa	361	(160)
1946–1949	Notts County	55	(10)
Total		416	(170)

International career
1930–1932	England	7	(5)

Managerial career
- 1949–1953: Notts County
- 1953–1958: Aston Villa
- * Club domestic league appearances and goals

William Eric Houghton (29 June 1910 – 1 May 1996) was an English footballer and manager and first-class cricketer.

Houghton played in the Villa side for two decades, scoring 170 goals in 392 games. (The total including wartime matches was over 200 goals.) His formidable and powerful shot was regarded as the hardest shot of his era. Houghton converted 58 spot kicks and also scored direct from about 30 free-kicks. He is often referred to as 'Mr Aston Villa' in recognition of his long standing service and contribution to the club.

== Playing career ==
Eric Houghton was born in Billingborough, Lincolnshire. He educated at Donington Grammar School and signed for Aston Villa as a seventeen-year-old.

Houghton scored 30 goals in the 1930–31 season, in which Villa scored 128 league goals, a First Division record.

Houghton's career was interrupted by the outbreak of World War II. In September 1939, he played in the Villa Reserves last pre-war game at home to Derby County. On 4th September the Government announced a ban on Sport to prevent crowds gathering. Villa's League match away to Wolves was one of over thirty mid-week League fixtures called-off. Villa Park found itself in an evacuation district designated under the British Government's civilian evacuation scheme. The Police Chief Constable of Birmingham, C.C.H Moriarty, intimated that he would not sanction football matches within the city of Birmingham. The Football League's Scheme for War-time football proposed to limit gates to 8,000 in evacuation areas. With their large overheads, the directors of Aston Villa and Sunderland announced their intention to close down. The manager and players were paid off whilst Villa Park was commandeered by the War Office. Villa's players quickly found war-time employment. Houghton became a constable in Birmingham City Police.

Houghton finished his playing career at Notts County.

== Coaching and managerial career ==
After managing Notts County, he went on to become Aston Villa manager

Houghton guided Villa to a record seventh FA Cup triumph in 1957. He later returned to Villa as a director, the only person to do this at the club. He had four children. In 2006 the club announced the creation of an Aston Villa Hall of Fame. This was voted for by fans and the inaugural induction saw 12 former players, managers and directors named. Eric Houghton was chosen.

He also played seven first-class matches as a Right-handed and a right-arm bowler for Warwickshire County Cricket Club (1946–1947) and also minor counties cricket for Lincolnshire County Cricket Club. He also played club cricket for Sleaford, Aston Unity and Olton Cricket Clubs.

His cousins, Roy Houghton and Reg Goodacre, were also footballers. His son Neil chaired Warwickshire County Cricket Club (2003–2011) and his great-nephew Chris Woods was a successful international footballer.

He died in Sutton Coldfield on 1 May 1996, aged 85.

== International career ==
He also won seven caps for England.
