= 2009 in association football =

The following are the association football events of the year 2009 throughout the world.

== News ==
=== General ===
- Major League Soccer (United States/Canada) expands to 15 teams with the launch of Seattle Sounders FC.
- Women's Professional Soccer, the successor to the defunct Women's United Soccer Association in the US, launched in March with 7 teams.
- During the 2009–10 A-League season, the FFA, the governing body of the sport in Australia, will expand the 8 team A-League to include 10 teams, with the addition of clubs from North Queensland and the Gold Coast.

=== January ===
- 1 – Gamba Osaka win the 88th edition of the Emperor's Cup and qualify for the 2009 AFC Champions League.
- 11 – Club Deportivo Guadalajara win the InterLiga 2009, Guadalajara and runners-up C.F. Pachuca both qualify for the Copa Libertadores.
- 12 – The 2008 FIFA World Player of the Year ceremony took place in Zürich, Switzerland. Cristiano Ronaldo was awarded the men's prize and Marta won the women's prize for the third consecutive year.
- 13 – Uganda win their tenth CECAFA Cup, beating Kenya 1–0 in the final at the National Stadium, Kampala.
- 17 – Oman win the 19th Arabian Gulf Cup, beating Saudi Arabia, 6–5 on penalties.

=== February ===
- 23 – K-League 2008 champions Suwon Samsung Bluewings defeat MLS representative Los Angeles Galaxy at the final game of Pan-Pacific Championship 2009 by penalty shootout after 1–1 game, winning the second champion title of Pan-Pacific Championship. J. League Cup 2008 winners Oita Trinita win the third place match against Chinese Super League 2008 champions Shandong Luneng Taishan, 2–1.
- 28 – Melbourne Victory win the grand final of the 2008–09 A-League season.

=== March ===
- 14 – In the Premier League, Liverpool beat Manchester United 4–1 at Old Trafford, completing a "double" against both Manchester United and Chelsea this season.

=== May ===
- 2 - Barcelona beat Real Madrid 2–6 at the Santiago Bernabeu Stadium.
- 25 – Burnley beat Sheffield United 1–0 at Wembley Stadium in the second tier of English football's play-off final and are promoted to the top flight.
- 27 - Barcelona beat Manchester United 2–0 at Stadio Olimpico in Rome, winning their 3rd Champions League title.

=== June ===
- 6 – Japan, Australia, South Korea, and Netherlands are officially qualified for the 2010 FIFA World Cup.
- 17 – North Korea is qualified for the 2010 FIFA World Cup.
- 28 – Brazil beats the USA 3–2 at the final of the FIFA Confederations Cup 2009 in Johannesburg, South Africa, winning two consecutive FIFA Confederations Cup titles.

=== July ===
- 9 – Liga Deportiva Universitaria de Quito beats SC Internacional 4–0 on aggregate at the 2009 Recopa Sudamericana.
- 26 – Players from the 1990 England and West Germany national teams are to replay their Italia '90 World Cup semi-final match in aid of charity, for the Sir Bobby Robson Trophy.
- 28 – Former Ipswich, Newcastle, England and Barcelona manager Bobby Robson dies at age 76.

=== September ===
- 3 – Romanian goalkeeper Alexandru Iatan of Dunărea Giurgiu died while training penalty shots when the ball hit his chest.
- 10 – The International Federation of Football History & Statistics, an organization recognized by FIFA, has published a continental Clubs of 20th Century ranking.
- 27 – HB Tórshavn beat the Faroese league for the 20th time. The first club on the islands to reach this milestone.

=== October ===
- 27 - 3rd tier side Alcorcón beat 4-0 La Liga side Real Madrid in a Spanish cup match. This match was given the name Alcorconazo by the Spanish media and by Alcorcón fans.

=== November ===
- 14 – New Zealand beats Bahrain 1–0 on aggregate at the AFC–OFC play-off. The All Whites book their first World Cup trip since 1982, while Bahrain lose for the second straight time in an inter-confederation play-off, having lost to Trinidad and Tobago in 2006.
- 18 – Controversies over Republic of Ireland vs France match, one of the 2010 FIFA World Cup qualification – UEFA second round play-offs, occur due to France's play-off-winning goal in connection with intentional handball by French captain Thierry Henry.
- 18 – Uruguay beats Costa Rica 2–1 on aggregate at the CONCACAF–CONMEBOL play-off, making themselves the last of 32 countries qualifying for the 2010 FIFA World Cup.

=== December ===
- 2 - Liga Deportiva Universitaria de Quito beats Fluminense FC 5–4 on aggregate at the 2009 Copa Sudamericana finals.
- 4 – The final draw for 2010 FIFA World Cup is held in Cape Town, South Africa.
- 19 – FC Barcelona beats Estudiantes de La Plata 2–1 in the final match of the 2009 FIFA Club World Cup.
- 21 – The 2009 FIFA World Player of the Year awards are handed out in Zürich. The men's award goes to Lionel Messi of Argentina and FC Barcelona. The women's award goes to Marta of Brazil and the Los Angeles Sol, who becomes the first player of either sex to win the award four times (in her case, consecutively).

== Events ==
=== Men's national teams ===
==== CAF ====
- 31 December 2008 – 13 January 2009: 2008 CECAFA Cup in Uganda
  - (gold) Uganda
  - (silver) Kenya
  - (bronze) Tanzania
  - 4th Burundi
- 28 November–13 December: 2009 CECAFA Cup in Kenya
  - (gold) Uganda
  - (silver) Rwanda
  - (bronze) Zanzibar
  - 4th Tanzania

==== AFC ====
- 4–17 January: 19th Arabian Gulf Cup in Oman
  - (gold) Oman
  - (silver) Saudi Arabia
  - (bronze) Qatar/Kuwait

==== CONCACAF ====
- 3–26 July: 2009 CONCACAF Gold Cup in the United States
  - (gold) Mexico
  - (silver) United States
  - (bronze) Costa Rica, Honduras

==== FIFA ====
- 14–28 June: FIFA Confederations Cup 2009 in South Africa
  - (gold) Brazil
  - (silver) United States
  - (bronze) Spain
  - 4th South Africa
- 24 September – 16 October: 2009 FIFA U-20 World Cup in Egypt
  - (gold) Ghana
  - (silver) Brazil
  - (bronze) Hungary
  - 4th Costa Rica
- 24 October – 15 November: 2009 FIFA U-17 World Cup in Nigeria
  - (gold) Switzerland
  - (silver) Nigeria
  - (bronze) Spain
  - 4th Colombia

== Club football ==
| Region | Tournament | Champion | Title | Last Honor |
|---|---|---|---|---|
| AFC (Asia) | 2009 AFC Champions League | (South Korea) Pohang Steelers | 3rd | 1997–98 |
| AFC (Asia) | 2009 AFC Cup | Al Kuwait | 1st | N/A |
| AFC (Asia) | 2009 AFC President's Cup | (Tajikistan) Regar-TadAZ | 4th | 2008 |
| CAF (Africa) | 2009 CAF Champions League | (Democratic Republic of the Congo) TP Mazembe | 3rd | 1968 |
| CAF (Africa) | 2009 CAF Confederation Cup | (Mali) Stade Malien | 1st | N/A |
| CAF (Africa) | 2009 CAF Super Cup | (Egypt) Al Ahly | 4th | 2007 |
| CONCACAF (North and Central America, Caribbean) | 2008–09 CONCACAF Champions League | (Mexico) Atlante | 2nd | 1983 |
| CONCACAF (North and Central America, Caribbean) | 2009 North American SuperLiga | (Mexico) Tigres UANL | 1st | N/A |
| CONCACAF (North and Central America, Caribbean) | 2009 CFU Club Championship | (Trinidad and Tobago) W Connection | 4th | 2006 |
| CONMEBOL (South America) | 2009 Copa Libertadores | (Argentina) Estudiantes | 3rd | 1970 |
| CONMEBOL (South America) | 2009 Copa Sudamericana | (Ecuador) LDU Quito | 1st | N/A |
| CONMEBOL (South America) | 2009 Recopa Sudamericana | (Ecuador) LDU Quito | 1st | N/A |
| OFC (Oceania) | 2008–09 OFC Champions League | (New Zealand) Auckland City | 3rd | 2006 |
| UEFA (Europe) | 2008–09 UEFA Champions League | (Spain) Barcelona | 3rd | 2005–06 |
| UEFA (Europe) | 2008–09 UEFA Cup | (Ukraine) Shakhtar Donetsk | 1st | N/A |
| UEFA (Europe) | 2009 UEFA Super Cup | (Spain) Barcelona | 1st | N/A |
| FIFA (Worldwide) | 2009 FIFA Club World Cup | (Spain) Barcelona | 1st | N/A |

=== Women ===
| Region | Tournament | Champion | Title | Last honor |
|---|---|---|---|---|
| CONMEBOL (South America) | 2009 Copa Libertadores Femenina | (Brazil) Santos FC (women) | 1st | N/A |
| UEFA (Europe) | 2008–09 UEFA Women's Cup | (Germany) FCR 2001 Duisburg | 1st | N/A |

== National champions ==
=== AFC ===
- Australia – Melbourne Victory
- Bahamas – Muharraq Club
- Bangladesh – Abahani Limited
- Bhutan – Druk Star
- Cambodia – a Corp
- China – Beijing Guoan
- Chinese Taipei – Kaohsiung City Yaoti
- Guam – Quality Distributors
- Hong Kong – South China AA
- India – Churchill Brothers
- Indonesia – Persipura Jayapura
- Iran – Esteghlal
- Iraq – Arbil FC
- Japan – Kashima Antlers
- Jordan – Al-Wahdat
- South Korea – Jeonbuk Hyundai Motors
- Kuwait – Al-Qadisiya Kuwait
- Kyrgyzstan – Dordoi-Dynamo
- Lebanon – Nejmeh
- Macau – Lam Pak
- Malaysia – Selangor FA
- Oman – Al-Nahda
- Pakistan – WAPDA
- Palestine – Wadi Al-Nes
- Qatar – Al-Gharrafa
- Saudi Arabia – Al-Ittihad
- Singapore – SAFFC
- Syria – Al-Karamah
- Tajikistan – Vakhsh Qurghonteppa
- Thailand – Muang Thong United
- Turkmenistan – HTTU Aşgabat
- United Arab Emirates – Al-Ahli
- Uzbekistan – Bunyodkor
- Vietnam – Đà Nẵng

=== CAF ===
- Algeria – ES Sétif
- Cameroon – Tiko United
- Egypt – Al Ahly
- Libya – Al-Ittihad
- Morocco – Raja Casablanca
- Nigeria – Bayelsa United
- South Africa – Supersport United
- Tunisia – Espérance Sportive de Tunis

=== CONCACAF ===
- Mexico: Mexican Primera División – UNAM (C); Monterrey (A)
- United States
  - Major League Soccer (USA/Canada) – Real Salt Lake (P) / Columbus Crew (L)
  - Women's Professional Soccer (USA) – Sky Blue FC

Note: "(A)" means Apertura champion; "(C)" mean Clausura champion.
Note: "(P)" designates the MLS Cup playoffs champion; "(L)" designates the MLS Supporters' Shield winner.

=== CONMEBOL ===
- Argentina: – Vélez Sársfield (C); Banfield (A)
- Bolivia: – Bolívar (A); Blooming (C)
- Brazil: – Flamengo
- Chile: – Universidad de Chile (A); Colo-Colo (C)
- Colombia: – Once Caldas (A); Independiente Medellín (C)
- Ecuador: – Deportivo Quito
- Paraguay: – Cerro Porteño (A); Nacional (C)
- Peru: – Universitario de Deportes
- Uruguay: – Nacional
- Venezuela: – Caracas

Note: "(A)" means Apertura champion; "(C)" mean Clausura champion.

=== OFC ===
- Fiji – Lakota
- French Polynesia – Manu-Ura
- New Caledonia – Magenta
- New Zealand – Auckland City
- Vanuatu – Tafea FC

=== UEFA ===
- Albania – Tirana
- Andorra – Sant Julià
- Armenia – Pyunik
- Austria – Red Bull Salzburg
- Azerbaijan – Baku
- Belarus – BATE Borisov
- Belgium – Standard Liège
- Bosnia and Herzegovina – Zrinjski Mostar
- Bulgaria – Levski Sofia
- Croatia – Dinamo Zagreb
- Cyprus – APOEL
- Czech Republic – Slavia Prague
- Denmark – Copenhagen
- England – Manchester United
- Estonia – Levadia
- Faroe Islands – HB Tórshavn
- Finland – HJK Helsinki
- France – Bordeaux
- (Georgia (country)) Georgia – WIT Georgia
- Germany – Wolfsburg
- Greece – Olympiacos
- Hungary – Debrecen
- Iceland – FH
- Republic of Ireland – Bohemians
- Israel – Maccabi Haifa
- Italy – Internazionale
- Kazakhstan – FC Aktobe
- Latvia – FK Liepājas Metalurgs
- Lithuania – FK Ekranas
- Luxembourg – F91 Dudelange
- (North Macedonia) Macedonia – Makedonija Gjorče Petrov
- Malta – Hibernians
- Moldova – Sheriff Tiraspol
- Montenegro – Mogren
- Netherlands – AZ
- Northern Ireland – Glentoran
- Norway – Rosenborg
- Poland – Wisła Kraków
- Portugal – Porto
- Romania – Unirea Urziceni
- Russia – Rubin Kazan
- San Marino – Tre Fiori
- Scotland – Rangers
- Serbia – Partizan
- Slovakia – Slovan Bratislava
- Slovenia – Maribor
- Spain – Barcelona
- Sweden – AIK
- Switzerland – Zürich
- Turkey – Beşiktaş
- Ukraine – Dynamo Kyiv
- Wales – Rhyl

== Deaths ==
=== January ===
- 2 January – Ian Greaves (76), English defender and manager
- 2 January – Ryuzo Hiraki (77), Japanese defender and national team manager
- 2 January – Kamel Karia (58), Tunisian goalkeeper
- 4 January – Lei Clijsters (52), Belgian defender and coach, father of Kim Clijsters
- 4 January – Arvid Knutsen (80), Norwegian forward and coach
- 5 January – Jimmy Rayner (73), English striker
- 6 January – Shmuel Ben Dror (84), Israeli midfielder, scorer of the first ever goal of the Israel national football team
- 6 January – Charlie Thomson (78), Scottish goalkeeper
- 7 January – Alfie Conn, Sr. (82), Scottish forward
- 8 January – Alberto Eliani (86), Italian defender
- 9 January – Victor Mosa (63), Italian/French defender
- 10 January – Jack Wheeler (89), English goalkeeper
- 12 January – Friaça, (84) Brazilian forward, runner-up at the 1950 FIFA World Cup
- 13 January – Tommy Casey (78), Northern Irish midfielder
- 14 January – Tomi Jalo (50), Finnish midfielder
- 16 January – Cláudio Milar (35), Uruguayan striker, traffic accident
- 17 January – Tomislav Crnković (79), Croatian defender
- 19 January – Joop Wille (88), Dutch goalkeeper
- 20 January – Johnny Dixon (85), English striker
- 21 January – Jaime Belmonte (74), Mexican midfielder, participated in the 1958 FIFA World Cup
- 21 January – Vic Crowe (76), Welsh midfielder
- 21 January – Peter Persidis (61), Austrian defender
- 22 January – Clément Pinault (23), French defender, heart attack
- 24 January – Fernando Cornejo (39), Chilean midfielder, cancer
- 24 January – Karl Koller (79), Austrian midfielder
- 26 January – Ivan Jensen (76), Danish midfielder
- 27 January – Aubrey Powell (90), Welsh forward
- 29 January – Willi Köchling (75), German defender
- 29 January – Roy Saunders (78), English midfielder
- 30 January – Pieter Van Den Bosch (71), Belgian midfielder, participated in the 1954 FIFA World Cup

=== February ===
- 2 February – Paul Birch (46), English midfielder
- 7 February – Joe Haverty (72), Irish midfielder
- 8 February – Jouni Jalonen (66), Finnish defender, Finnish Footballer of the Year in 1968
- 9 February – Reg Davies (79), Welsh forward
- 9 February – Neville Hamilton (48), English midfielder
- 10 February – Holger Olsen (88), Danish defender
- 12 February – Giacomo Bulgarelli (68), Italian midfielder, participated in the 1962 FIFA World Cup, 1966 FIFA World Cup and UEFA Euro 1968
- 13 February – Jerzy Hawrylewicz (50), Polish forward
- 15 February – Don Leeson (73), English goalkeeper
- 20 February – Július Nôta (37), Slovak goalkeeper, stabbing

=== March ===
- 1 March – Elefterios Manolios (73), French goalkeeper
- 2 March – Andy Bowman (74), Scottish midfielder
- 2 March – Carlos Sosa (89), Argentine defender
- 3 March – Åke Lindman (81), Finnish defender
- 3 March – José Moncebáez (80), Mexican goalkeeper and national team coach
- 4 March – Harry Parkes (89), English defender
- 5 March – Valeri Broshin (46), Russian midfielder
- 7 March – Jimmy Hernon (84), Scottish midfielder
- 7 March – Edouard Oum Ndeki (32), Cameroonian midfielder, hepatitis
- 7 March – Anton Shokh (49), Kazakhstani-Russian midfielder
- 9 March – Eddie Lowe (83), English midfielder
- 10 March – Jack Capper (77), Welsh defender
- 12 March – Ferenc Szabó, (88) Hungarian footballer
- 15 March – Jumadi Abdi, (36) Indonesian footballer
- 16 March – Alan Suddick (64), English midfielder
- 28 March – Hugh Kelly (85), Scottish defender
- 29 March – Vladimir Fedotov (66), Russian striker
- 31 March – Enea Masiero (75), Italian midfielder

=== April ===
- 2 April – Víctor Hugo Ávalos (37), Paraguayan midfielder
- 6 April – Gheorghe Ene (72), Romanian striker
- 11 April – Jimmy Neighbour (58), English midfielder
- 12 April – Mike Keen (69), English midfielder
- 12 April – Louis Leysen (76), Belgian goalkeeper
- 13 April – Miguel Ángel Mori (65), Argentine midfielder, participated in the 1964 Summer Olympics
- 19 April – Maurilio Prini (76), Italian midfielder
- 19 April – Dicky Robinson (82), English defender
- 19 April – Brian Tyrrell (-), Irish football forward
- 20 April – Franco Rotella (42), Italian midfielder
- 23 April – Lam Sheung Yee (74), Hong Kong defender
- 25 April – Miljenko Bajić (54), Bosnian defender

=== May ===
- 1 May – Jokke Kangaskorpi (37), Finnish forward
- 3 May – John Elsworthy (77), Welsh midfielder, member of the squad for the 1958 FIFA World Cup
- 3 May – Tommy Fowler (84), English midfielder
- 4 May – Bobby Campbell (86), Scottish winger
- 9 May – Juan Gómez (84), Mexican defender, participated in the 1954 FIFA World Cup
- 13 May – Norbert Eschmann (75), Swiss-French midfielder, member of the squad for the 1954 FIFA World Cup and 1962 FIFA World Cup
- 14 May – Ken Hollyman, Welsh footballer (86)
- 16 May – Peter Sampson, English footballer (81)
- 19 May – Andrei Ivanov (42), Russian defender
- 19 May – Knut Hammer Larsen, Norwegian footballer (38)
- 20 May – Alan Kelly Sr., Irish footballer (72)
- 21 May – Walter da Silva, Brazilian footballer (67)
- 21 May – Anatoli Kirilov, Bulgarian footballer
- 24 May – Youssef Elbai (30), French defender
- 25 May – Billy Baxter (70), Scottish midfielder/defender
- 27 May – Ammo Baba, Iraqi footballer (74)
- 28 May – Ercole Rabitti, Italian footballer (87)
- 30 May – Alexander Obregón, Colombian footballer (31)
- 30 May – Gunnar Arnesen (81), Norwegian forward

=== June ===
- 2 June – Rodrigo García Vizoso (100), Spanish goalkeeper and coach
- 4 June – Lev Brovarskyi (60), Ukrainian midfielder
- 6 June – Bobby Haarms (74), Dutch midfielder
- 7 June – Willie Kilmarnock (87), Scottish footballer
- 7 June – Gordon Lennon (26), Northern Irish defender, traffic accident
- 8 June – Aage Rou Jensen (84), Danish striker
- 10 June – Stelios Skevofilakas (69), Greek footballer
- 11 June – Alan Philpott (66), English midfielder
- 14 June – Abel Tador (24), Nigerian footballer
- 17 June – Shacky Tauro (49, Zimbabwean footballer
- 18 June – Mihai Mocanu (67), Romanian defender, participated in the 1970 FIFA World Cup
- 20 June – Joseph Ibanez (82), French midfielder and coach
- 23 June – Jackie Swindells (72), English striker
- 24 June – Mario Tontodonati (85), Italian midfielder/forward

=== July ===
- 2 July – Kaj Hansen (68), Swedish defender, participated in the 1964 European Nations' Cup
- 3 July – Sadek Boukhalfa (74), Algerian midfielder
- 6 July – Mihai Baicu (33), Romanian midfielder, cardiac arrest
- 12 July – Tommy Cummings (80), English midfielder and manager
- 13 July – Axel Pilmark (83), Danish midfielder, participated in the 1948 Summer Olympics
- 14 July – Kujtim Majaci (47), Albanian forward
- 17 July – Otto Bresling (88), Danish midfielder
- 20 July – Sargis Aroyan (18), Armenian forward
- 21 July – Dai Lawrence (62), Welsh defender
- 24 July – Zé Carlos (47), Brazilian goalkeeper
- 25 July – Ricardo Bonelli (76), Argentine midfielder
- 25 July – Italo Romagnoli (93), Italian defender
- 25 July – Zequinha (74), Brazilian midfielder, on the squad for the 1962 FIFA World Cup
- 29 July – Paul McGrillen (37), Scottish striker, suicide
- 30 July – Yuri Kurnenin (55), Belarusian midfielder and manager
- 31 July – Sir Bobby Robson (76), English forward and manager

=== August ===
- 2 August – Joe Livingstone (67), English striker
- 5 August – Mario Tiddia (73), Italian defender and manager
- 8 August – Daniel Jarque (26), Spanish defender, heart attack
- 8 August – Orlando Rozzoni (72), Italian forward
- 9 August – Tommy Clinton (83), Irish defender
- 9 August – Massimiliano Fiondella (41), Italian defender
- 10 August – Francisco Valdés (66), Chilean midfielder
- 11 August – Lazare Gianessi (83), French defender, participated in the 1954 FIFA World Cup
- 11 August – Jan Sillo, (32) South African footballer
- 13 August – Brian McLaughlin (54), Scottish midfielder
- 19 August – Vic Snell (81), English defender
- 19 August – Bobby Thomson (65), English defender and manager
- 24 August – Virginio De Paoli (71), Italian striker
- 31 August – Torsten Lindberg (92), Swedish goalkeeper and manager, participated in the 1948 Summer Olympics and 1950 FIFA World Cup

=== September ===
- 1 September – Jock Buchanan (74), Scottish forward
- 7 September – Norman Curtis, (84), English footballer
- 9 September – Léon Glovacki (81), French striker and manager, participated in the 1954 FIFA World Cup
- 11 September – Carlo De Bernardi (56), Italian midfielder
- 11 September – Jean-François Prigent (65), French midfielder
- 11 September – Henny van Schoonhoven (39), Dutch defender, cancer
- 13 September – Paul Shirtliff (46), English defender
- 19 September – Stevie Gray (42), English footballer
- 19 September – Brian Filipi (20), Albanian midfielder, traffic accident
- 20 September – Hernan Córdoba, (19) Colombian footballer
- 20 September – Mario Beltrán (23), Colombian midfielder, traffic accident
- 20 September – Hernan Córdoba (19), Colombian striker, traffic accident
- 22 September – Marco Achilli (60), Italian midfielder
- 23 September – Dennis Pacey, (80), English footballer
- 24 September – Terry Bly (73), English striker and manager
- 26 September – Geoff Barrowcliffe (77), English defender
- 27 September – René Bliard (76), French striker
- 27 September – Raúl Savoy (68), Argentine midfielder
- 28 September – Horst Feilzer (52), German forward
- 28 September – Best Ogedegbe, (55), Nigerian footballer
- 30 September – Raúl Magaña (69), Salvadoran goalkeeper and manager

=== October ===
- 1 October – Mangue Cissé (60), Ivorian defender, father of Djibril Cissé
- 2 October – Rolf Rüssmann (58), German defender, participated in the 1978 FIFA World Cup
- 3 October – Zoran Mijucić (40), Serbian midfielder, participated in the 1987 FIFA World Youth Championship
- 4 October – Gerhard Kaufhold (80), German midfielder/striker
- 5 October – Tommy Capel (87), English forward
- 8 October – Alex McCrae (89), Scottish forward
- 9 October – Arne Bakker (79), Norwegian midfielder
- 9 October – Horst Szymaniak (75), German midfielder, participated in the 1958 FIFA World Cup and the 1962 FIFA World Cup
- 11 October – Gustav Kral (26), Austrian goalkeeper, traffic accident
- 12 October – Massimo Mattolini (56), Italian goalkeeper
- 12 October – Stan Palk, (87), English footballer
- 13 October – Orane Simpson (26), Jamaican midfielder, stabbing
- 15 October – Heinz Versteeg, (70), Dutch footballer
- 17 October – David Burnside (69), English midfielder and manager
- 21 October – John Jarman (78), Welsh midfielder
- 22 October – Ray Lambert, (87) Welsh footballer
- 22 October – Albert Watson, (91) English footballer
- 23 October – Collins Mbulo (38), Zambian goalkeeper
- 27 October – Frank Brady, Jr. (age unknown), Irish midfielder
- 30 October – Juvenal, Brazilian defender, runner-up at the 1950 FIFA World Cup. (85)
- 30 October – František Veselý (65), Czech forward, participated in the 1970 FIFA World Cup and the UEFA Euro 1976

=== November ===
- 2 November – Keith Kettleborough (74), English midfielder
- 2 November – Paolo Perugi (44), Italian midfielder
- 3 November – Archie Baird, (90), Scottish footballer
- 4 November – Stefano Chiodi (52), Italian midfielder
- 7 November – Billy Ingham (57), English midfielder
- 10 November – Robert Enke (32), German goalkeeper, suicide
- 12 November – Willy Kernen, (80), Swiss footballer
- 13 November – Héctor Facundo (72), Argentine midfielder, participated in the 1962 FIFA World Cup
- 15 November – Ray Charnley (74), English forward
- 15 November – Don Martin (65), English forward
- 16 November – Antonio de Nigris (31), Mexican striker, heart attack
- 18 November – Salem Saad (31), Emirati striker, heart attack
- 19 November – Frank Beattie (76), Scottish footballer
- 22 November – Juan Carlos Muñoz (90), Argentine midfielder
- 23 November – Tony Parry (64), English defender
- 25 November – Mike Tiddy (80), English midfielder
- 26 November – Giuseppe Baldini (87), Italian striker and manager
- 26 November – Nikola Kovachev, (75), Bulgarian footballer
- 29 November – George Cummins (78), Irish forward
- 30 November – Christoph Budde (46), German striker

=== December ===
- December – Henry Andersson (85), Swedish goalkeeper
- 1 December – Neil Dougall (88), Scottish midfielder and manager
- 1 December – Alberto Martínez (59), Uruguayan midfielder
- 1 December – Christoph Budde, German footballer (46)
- 12 December – Manuel Ruiz Sosa (72), Spanish midfielder and manager
- 13 December – Wilton Cezar Xavier (62) Brazilian footballer
- 14 December – Alan A'Court (75), English midfielder and manager, participated in the 1958 FIFA World Cup
- 16 December – Dennis Herod, (86) English footballer
- 17 December – Michel Leblond (77), French midfielder and manager, on the squad for the 1954 FIFA World Cup
- 17 December – Guillermo Ortiz (69), Mexican midfielder, on the squad for the 1962 FIFA World Cup
- 17 December – Miljenko Mihić, (75) Serbian football coach
- 20 December – Jack Brownsword (86), English defender
- 22 December – Albert Scanlon (74), English forward, survivor of the Munich air disaster
- 24 December – Hugo Berly (67), Chilean defender, on the squad for the 1966 FIFA World Cup
- 26 December – Giuseppe Chiappella (85), Italian midfielder and manager
- 27 December – Takashi Takabayashi, (78), Japan footballer
- 28 December – Allen Batsford (77), English football manager

== Clubs founded ==
- RB Leipzig
