= 2008–09 in English football =

Football in England
- Season: 2008–09

Men's football
- Premier League: Manchester United
- Championship: Wolverhampton Wanderers
- League One: Leicester City
- League Two: Brentford
- Conference National: Burton Albion
- FA Cup: Chelsea
- League Cup: Manchester United
- Community Shield: Manchester United

Women's football
- Premier League National Division: Arsenal
- Premier League Northern Division: Sunderland
- Premier League Southern Division: Millwall Lionesses
- FA Women's Cup: Arsenal
- Premier League Cup: Arsenal

The 2008–09 season was the 129th season of competitive football in England. The Premier League started on 16 August 2008, while the Championship, League One, and League Two matches started on 9 August 2008. The regular season of the Football League ended on 3 May 2009, while the Premier League ended on 24 May 2009.

The Premier League title was won by Manchester United, capturing their 18th top-division title and third in a row. Three teams, Newcastle United, Middlesbrough, and West Bromwich Albion were relegated at the end of the season. They were replaced by three teams from the Championship, being the champion Wolverhampton Wanderers alongside regular season runner up Birmingham City, and Burnley, which won a four-team playoff for the third promotion spot. Relegated from Championship to League One were Norwich City, Southampton, and Charlton Athletic. The League One teams promoted to the Championship include champions Leicester City, runners up Peterborough United, and playoff winners Scunthorpe United. Relegated from League One to League Two were Northampton Town, Crewe Alexandra, Cheltenham Town and Hereford United. Promoted from League Two were the champions Brentford, runners up Exeter City, third-place finishers Wycombe Wanderers, and playoff winners Scunthorpe United. Relegated to Conference were Chester City and Luton Town

The England national football team played in four friendlies, winning two, losing one, and playing to a draw in the other. During the season, England played seven of its ten Group 6 matches for the 2010 FIFA World Cup qualification, winning all seven.

The FA Cup was won by Chelsea who defeated Everton 2–1 in the final.

== Managerial changes ==
=== In-season managerial changes ===
Name	Club	Date of departure	Replacement	Date of appointment
Kevin Bond	Bournemouth	1 September 2008	Jimmy Quinn	2 September 2008
Alan Curbishley	West Ham United	3 September 2008	Gianfranco Zola	11 September 2008
Kevin Keegan	Newcastle United	4 September 2008	Joe Kinnear^{1}	26 September 2008
Keith Downing	Cheltenham Town	13 September 2008	Martin Allen	15 September 2008
Alan Buckley	Grimsby Town	15 September 2008	Mike Newell	6 October 2008
Geraint Williams	Colchester United	22 September 2008	Paul Lambert	9 October 2008
Lee Sinnott	Port Vale	22 September 2008	Dean Glover^{2}	6 October 2008
Iain Dowie	Queens Park Rangers	24 October 2008	Paulo Sousa	19 November 2008
Juande Ramos	Tottenham Hotspur	25 October 2008	Harry Redknapp	26 October 2008
Harry Redknapp	Portsmouth	26 October 2008	Tony Adams^{3}	28 October 2008
John Ward	Carlisle United	3 November 2008	Greg Abbott^{4}	5 December 2008
Aidy Boothroyd	Watford	3 November 2008	Brendan Rodgers	24 November 2008
Stan Ternent	Huddersfield Town	4 November 2008	Lee Clark	11 December 2008
Simon Davies	Chester City	11 November 2008	Mark Wright	14 November 2008
Maurice Malpas	Swindon Town	14 November 2008	Danny Wilson	26 December 2008
Steve Holland	Crewe Alexandra	18 November 2008	Gudjon Thordarson	24 December 2008
Alan Pardew	Charlton Athletic	22 November 2008	Phil Parkinson^{5}	31 December 2008
Roy Keane	Sunderland	4 December 2008	Ricky Sbragia^{6}	27 December 2008
Danny Wilson	Hartlepool United	15 December 2008	Chris Turner	15 December 2008
Gary McAllister	Leeds United	21 December 2008	Simon Grayson	23 December 2008
Simon Grayson	Blackpool	23 December 2008	Ian Holloway	21 May 2009
Colin Calderwood	Nottingham Forest	26 December 2008	Billy Davies	1 January 2009
Paul Fairclough	Barnet	28 December 2008	Ian Hendon^{9}	21 April 2009
Paul Jewell	Derby County	29 December 2008	Nigel Clough	6 January 2009
Jimmy Quinn	Bournemouth	31 December 2008	Eddie Howe^{7}	19 January 2009
Jimmy Mullen	Walsall	10 January 2009	Chris Hutchings	20 January 2009
Glenn Roeder	Norwich City	14 January 2009	Bryan Gunn^{8}	21 January 2009
Martin Ling	Leyton Orient	18 January 2009	Geraint Williams	5 February 2009
Jan Poortvliet	Southampton	23 January 2009	Mark Wotte	23 January 2009
Tony Adams	Portsmouth	9 February 2009	Paul Hart	3 March 2009
Luiz Felipe Scolari	Chelsea	9 February 2009	Guus Hiddink	11 February 2009
Russell Slade	Yeovil Town	16 February 2009	Terry Skiverton	18 February 2009
Micky Adams	Brighton & Hove Albion	21 February 2009	Russell Slade	6 March 2009
John Sheridan	Oldham Athletic	15 March 2009	Joe Royle	15 March 2009
Paulo Sousa	Queens Park Rangers	9 April 2009	Jim Magilton	3 June 2009
Jim Magilton	Ipswich Town	21 April 2009	Roy Keane	22 April 2009
Graham Turner	Hereford United	24 April 2009	John Trewick	24 April 2009
Joe Royle	Oldham Athletic	30 April 2009	Dave Penney	30 April 2009
Dave Penney	Darlington	30 April 2009	Colin Todd	20 May 2009

=== End-of-season managerial changes ===
Name	Club	Date of departure	Replacement	Date of appointment
Dean Glover	Port Vale	2 May 2009	Micky Adams	1 June 2009
Jim Gannon	Stockport County	6 May 2009	Gary Ablett	8 July 2009
Lee Richardson	Chesterfield	6 May 2009	John Sheridan	9 June 2009
Steve Coppell	Reading	12 May 2009	Brendan Rodgers	5 June 2009
Ricky Sbragia	Sunderland	24 May 2009	Steve Bruce	2 June 2009
Guus Hiddink	Chelsea	30 May 2009	Carlo Ancelotti	1 June 2009
Steve Bruce	Wigan Athletic	2 June 2009	Roberto Martínez	16 June 2009
Brendan Rodgers	Watford	5 June 2009	Malky Mackay	15 June 2009
Ronnie Moore	Tranmere Rovers	5 June 2009	John Barnes	15 June 2009
Roberto Martínez	Swansea City	16 June 2009	Paulo Sousa	29 June 2009
Tony Mowbray	West Bromwich Albion	17 June 2009	Roberto Di Matteo	1 July 2009
Mark Wright	Chester City	22 June 2009	Mick Wadsworth	29 June 2009
Roberto Di Matteo	Milton Keynes Dons	1 July 2009	Paul Ince	3 July 2009
Mark Wotte	Southampton	9 July 2009	Alan Pardew	17 July 2009

=== Notes ===
- ^{1} Joe Kinnear was named interim manager on 26 September, and signed as permanent manager on 28 November.
- ^{2} Dean Glover had previously been caretaker manager at Port Vale since Sinnott's departure.
- ^{3} Tony Adams had previously been caretaker manager at Portsmouth since Redknapp's departure.
- ^{4} Greg Abbott had previously been caretaker manager at Carlisle United since Ward's departure.
- ^{5} Phil Parkinson had previously been caretaker manager at Charlton Athletic since Pardew's departure.
- ^{6} Ricky Sbragia had previously been caretaker manager at Sunderland since Keane's departure.
- ^{7} Eddie Howe had previously been caretaker manager at Bournemouth since Quinn's departure.
- ^{8} Bryan Gunn had previously been caretaker manager at Norwich City since Roeder's departure.
- ^{9} Ian Hendon had previously been caretaker manager at Barnet since Fairclough's departure.

== National team ==
The home team is on the left column; the away team is on the right column.

=== Friendly matches ===
20 August 2008

England	2–2	Czech Republic
Brown 45'; J. Cole 90'	(Report)	Baroš 22'; Jankulovski 48'

Wembley Stadium, London
Attendance: 69,738
Referee: Terje Hauge (Norway)

19 November 2008

Germany	1–2	England
Helmes 63'	(Report)	Upson 23'; Terry 84'

Olympic Stadium, Berlin
Attendance: 74,224
Referee: Massimo Busacca (Switzerland)

11 February 2009

Spain	2–0	England
Villa 36'; Llorente 82'	(Report)

Estadio Ramón Sánchez Pizjuán, Seville
Attendance: 42,102
Referee: Stephane Lannoy (France)

28 March 2009

England	4–0	Slovakia
Heskey 6'; Rooney 70', 90'; Lampard 82'	(Report)

Wembley Stadium, London
Attendance: 85,512
Referee: Alain Hamer (Luxembourg)

=== World Cup qualifiers ===
England is currently in Group 6 of the 2010 FIFA World Cup qualification process.

6 September 2008

Andorra	0–2	England
	(Report)	J. Cole 49', 55'

Estadi Olímpic Lluís Companys, Barcelona
Attendance: 10,300
Referee: Cüneyt Çakır (Turkey)

10 September 2008

Croatia	1–4	England
Mandžukić 78'	(Report)	Walcott 26', 59', 82'; Rooney 63'

Maksimir Stadium, Zagreb
Attendance: 35,218
Referee: Ľuboš Micheľ (Slovakia)

11 October 2008

England	5–1	Kazakhstan
Ferdinand 52'; Kuchma 65' (o.g.); Rooney 77', 86'; Defoe 90'	(Report)	Kukeev 68'

Wembley Stadium, London
Attendance: 89,107
Referee: Paul Allaerts (Belgium)

15 October 2008

Belarus	1–3	England
Sitko 28'	(Report)	Gerrard 11'; Rooney 50', 74'

Dinamo Stadium, Minsk
Attendance: 32,000

1 April 2009

England	2–1	Ukraine
Crouch 29'; Terry 85'	(Report)	Shevchenko 74'

Wembley Stadium, London
Attendance: 87,548
Referee: Claus Bo Larsen (Denmark)

6 June 2009

Kazakhstan	0–4	England
	(Report)	Barry 39'; Heskey 45'; Rooney 73'; Lampard 77' (pen.)

Almaty Central Stadium, Almaty
Attendance: 23,281
Referee: Kristinn Jakobsson (Iceland)

10 June 2009

England	6–0	Andorra
Rooney 4', 39'; Lampard 29'; Defoe 73', 75'; Crouch 80'	(Report)

Wembley Stadium, London
Attendance: 57,897
Referee: Hendrikus Nijhuis (Netherlands)

== Honours ==
Competition	Winner	Details	Match Report
FA Cup	Chelsea	FA Cup 2008–09; Beat Everton 2–1	Report
League Cup	Manchester United	Football League Cup 2008–09; Beat Tottenham Hotspur 4–1 on penalties (0–0 final score)	Report
Premier League	Manchester United	Premier League 2008–09	Report
Football League Championship	Wolverhampton Wanderers	Football League Championship 2008–09	Report
Football League One	Leicester City	Football League One 2008–09	Report
Football League Two	Brentford	Football League Two 2008–09	Report
FA Community Shield	Manchester United	2008 FA Community Shield; Beat Portsmouth 3–1 on penalties (0–0 final score)	Report
Football League Trophy	Luton Town	Football League Trophy 2008–09; Beat Scunthorpe United 3–2 a.e.t	Report
FA Trophy	Stevenage Borough	FA Trophy 2008–09; Beat York City 2–0	Report
Conference League Cup	A.F.C. Telford United	Conference League Cup 2008–09; Beat Forest Green Rovers 3–0 on penalties. (0–0 final score)	Report

== League tables ==
=== Premier League ===
Manchester United won their 18th league title, drawing level with Liverpool for the record of most league titles. Liverpool pushed them all the way; they actually had a superior goal difference and completed the double over United, even winning 4–1 at Old Trafford in March, but also suffered 11 draws which enabled United to overtake and win the title. Chelsea broke records for all the wrong reasons as their 86-game unbeaten home record finally came to an end, with several surprise away losses effectively ending their title challenge (as well as resulting in manager Luiz Felipe Scolari being sacked), though they did win the FA Cup under caretaker manager Guus Hiddink. Arsenal finished fourth to claim the final Champions League spot, which meant that last season's top 4 all qualified for Europe's elite for the fifth time in six seasons.

Aston Villa had looked like breaking into the Champions League spots for most of the season, but a late collapse that saw them win just twice in their last 13 league games saw them join FA Cup finalists Everton in qualifying for the newly formed UEFA Europa League (which replaced the UEFA Cup). Fulham were the other team to qualify for Europe, marking a remarkable turnaround since Roy Hodgson had taken over 18 months earlier when relegation from the Premier League looked a certainty. This was not only the first time they had qualified for Europe via their league position, but in finishing 7th in the first tier, this was also the highest ever league finish in the club's history. Stoke City, despite being pre-season relegation favourites for many, defied their critics and finishing comfortably in mid-table.

West Bromwich Albion made an immediate return to the Championship after propping up the table for most of the season. Joining them on the final day were Middlesbrough and Newcastle United, ending 11 and 16-year spells in the top flight respectively, the latter going through four managers in Kevin Keegan, Joe Kinnear, Chris Hughton and even former striker Alan Shearer during the campaign. Sunderland survived relegation, thanks to the efforts of caretaker manager Ricky Sbragia after Roy Keane's surprise resignation in December; meaning next season they would be the only North-East team in top flight football. Despite a brilliant start to the season (Which included victories at Arsenal and Tottenham, a draw at Liverpool and a narrow 4–3 loss at Manchester United, and climbing as high as third place in October), Hull City won just one league game after the new year, but avoided relegation by a single point.

Pos	Team	Pld	W	D	L	GF	GA	GD	Pts	Qualification or relegation
1	Manchester United (C)	38	28	6	4	68	24	+44	90	Qualification for the Champions League group stage (Note: Since both finalists of the FA Cup (Chelsea and Everton) and the League Cup winners (Manchester United) qualified for the European competitions based on their league position, the sixth-placed team (Aston Villa) received a berth in the Europa League play-off round and the seventh-placed team (Fulham) received a berth in the Europa League third qualifying round.)
2	Liverpool	38	25	11	2	77	27	+50	86	Qualification for the Champions League group stage
3	Chelsea	38	25	8	5	68	24	+44	83	Qualification for the Champions League group stage
4	Arsenal	38	20	12	6	68	37	+31	72	Qualification for the Champions League play-off round
5	Everton	38	17	12	9	55	37	+18	63	Qualification for the Europa League play-off round
6	Aston Villa	38	17	11	10	54	48	+6	62	Qualification for the Europa League play-off round
7	Fulham	38	14	11	13	39	34	+5	53	Qualification for the Europa League third qualifying round
8	Tottenham Hotspur	38	14	9	15	45	45	0	51	
9	West Ham United	38	14	9	15	42	45	−3	51	
10	Manchester City	38	15	5	18	58	50	+8	50	
11	Wigan Athletic	38	12	9	17	34	45	−11	45	
12	Stoke City	38	12	9	17	38	55	−17	45	
13	Bolton Wanderers	38	11	8	19	41	53	−12	41	
14	Portsmouth	38	10	11	17	38	57	−19	41	
15	Blackburn Rovers	38	10	11	17	40	60	−20	41	
16	Sunderland	38	9	9	20	34	54	−20	36	
17	Hull City	38	8	11	19	39	64	−25	35	
18	Newcastle United (R)	38	7	13	18	40	59	−19	34	Relegation to Football League Championship
19	Middlesbrough (R)	38	7	11	20	28	57	−29	32	Relegation to Football League Championship
20	West Bromwich Albion (R)	38	8	8	22	36	67	−31	32	Relegation to Football League Championship

Source: Barclays Premier League
Rules for classification: 1) points; 2) goal difference; 3) number of goals scored.
(C) Champions; (R) Relegated
Notes:

Leading goalscorer: Nicolas Anelka (Chelsea) – 19

=== Football League Championship ===
Five years after being relegated from the Premier League, Wolverhampton Wanderers returned to the top flight in style as champions, having been in the top 2 for virtually all the season since August. Birmingham City were runners-up, making this the fourth season in a row that they had swapped divisions. Burnley joined them by beating Sheffield United in the play-off final, earning their place in the top flight after a 33-year absence.

Cardiff City occupied a play-off position for much of the season, but agonisingly slipped out of them on the final day after obtaining just one point in their final four league games. Preston North End in contrast, took twelve points from their final four league games, including a 6–0 win over Cardiff to finish ahead of them by courtesy of having scored one goal more throughout the season. Doncaster Rovers who were favourites to go straight back down and in the second tier after half a century out, achieved a respectable mid-table finish ahead of former Premier League teams in Crystal Palace, Coventry City, Derby County, Nottingham Forest and Barnsley.

Charlton suffered their second relegation in three years, despite a run of just one loss out of eight games at the end of the season. Southampton also crashed out of the division amid financial worries, which also meant they would be starting the 2009–10 season in League One with a ten-point deduction for entering administration. Norwich were the third relegated club, meaning that all three relegated clubs had been in the Premier League as recently as 2005 and had long left the third tier (Charlton last competed in the third tier in 1981, Southampton and Norwich in 1960).

Pos	Team	Pld	W	D	L	GF	GA	GD	Pts	Promotion, qualification or relegation
1	Wolverhampton Wanderers (C, P)	46	27	9	10	80	52	+28	90	Promotion to the Premier League
2	Birmingham City (P)	46	23	14	9	54	37	+17	83	Promotion to the Premier League
3	Sheffield United	46	22	14	10	64	39	+25	80	Qualification for Championship play-offs
4	Reading	46	21	14	11	72	40	+32	77	Qualification for Championship play-offs
5	Burnley (O, P)	46	21	13	12	72	60	+12	76	Qualification for Championship play-offs
6	Preston North End	46	21	11	14	66	54	+12	74	Qualification for Championship play-offs
7	Cardiff City	46	19	17	10	65	53	+12	74	
8	Swansea City	46	16	20	10	63	50	+13	68	
9	Ipswich Town	46	17	15	14	62	53	+9	66	
10	Bristol City	46	15	16	15	54	54	0	61	
11	Queens Park Rangers	46	15	16	15	42	44	−2	61	
12	Sheffield Wednesday	46	16	13	17	51	58	−7	61	
13	Watford	46	16	10	20	68	72	−4	58	
14	Doncaster Rovers	46	17	7	22	42	53	−11	58	
15	Crystal Palace	46	15	12	19	52	55	−3	56 (Note: Crystal Palace were give a one-point deduction for using an ineligible player during a match against Sheffield United on 3 May 2009.)	
16	Blackpool	46	13	17	16	47	58	−11	56	
17	Coventry City	46	13	15	18	47	58	−11	54	
18	Derby County	46	14	12	20	55	67	−12	54	
19	Nottingham Forest	46	13	14	19	50	65	−15	53	
20	Barnsley	46	13	13	20	45	58	−13	52	
21	Plymouth Argyle	46	13	12	21	44	57	−13	51	
22	Norwich City (R)	46	12	10	24	57	70	−13	46	Relegation to Football League One
23	Southampton (R)	46	10	15	21	46	69	−23	45 (Note: Southampton were given a ten-point deduction for breaching insolvency regulations, regarding their holding company. As they finished in the bottom three in the 2008–09 season, the points deduction was applied during the 2009–10 season in League One.)	Relegation to Football League One
24	Charlton Athletic (R)	46	8	15	23	52	74	−22	39	Relegation to Football League One

Updated to match(es) played on 3 May 2009. Source: The Football League
Rules for classification: 1) points; 2) goal difference; 3) number of goals scored.
(C) Champions; (O) Play-off winners; (P) Promoted; (R) Relegated
Notes:

Leading goalscorer: Sylvan Ebanks-Blake (Wolverhampton Wanderers) – 25

=== Football League One ===
Leicester comfortably won promotion in their first-ever season at this level, leading the table for virtually the entire season, going half the season (23 consecutive games) unbeaten and losing just 4 games in the process. Nigel Pearson brought stability to the club in becoming their first manager in five years to last an entire season as they looked to turn the corner after several years of struggle. Peterborough were runners-up, winning their second successive promotion and entering the second tier for only the second time in their history. Scunthorpe grabbed the final play-off place on the last day of the season in a winner takes all match v 7th place Tranmere Rovers and won promotion through them, making an immediate return to the Championship after being relegated the previous year.

Stockport went into administration before the final match of the season and so suffered a 10-point penalty; however, there was no real chance of them being relegated as a result of this penalty, barring an extremely unlikely set of results on the final day.

Hereford made an immediate return to League Two, finishing bottom in their first campaign at this level for thirty years. Cheltenham improved late in the season, but it proved too late to prevent relegation. Crewe suffered a late collapse and went down to League Two, having looked safe a few weeks previously. Northampton were relegated on the final day of the season after losing at Leeds and other results went against them. Brighton had looked certainties for relegation in the closing weeks, but the appointment of Russell Slade as manager saw them claim 16 points out of a possible 21 to survive. Carlisle and Hartlepool both survived on the last day.

Pos	Team	Pld	W	D	L	GF	GA	GD	Pts	Promotion or relegation
1	Leicester City (C, P)	46	27	15	4	84	39	+45	96	Promotion to Football League Championship
2	Peterborough United (P)	46	26	11	9	78	54	+24	89	Promotion to Football League Championship
3	Milton Keynes Dons	46	26	9	11	83	47	+36	87	Qualification for League One play-offs
4	Leeds United	46	26	6	14	77	49	+28	84	Qualification for League One play-offs
5	Millwall	46	25	7	14	63	53	+10	82	Qualification for League One play-offs
6	Scunthorpe United (O, P)	46	22	10	14	82	63	+19	76	Qualification for League One play-offs
7	Tranmere Rovers	46	21	11	14	62	49	+13	74	
8	Southend United	46	21	8	17	58	61	−3	71	
9	Huddersfield Town	46	18	14	14	62	65	−3	68	
10	Oldham Athletic	46	16	17	13	66	65	+1	65	
11	Bristol Rovers	46	17	12	17	79	61	+18	63	
12	Colchester United	46	18	9	19	58	58	0	63	
13	Walsall	46	17	10	19	61	66	−5	61	
14	Leyton Orient	46	15	11	20	45	57	−12	56	
15	Swindon Town	46	12	17	17	68	71	−3	53	
16	Brighton & Hove Albion	46	13	13	20	55	70	−15	52	
17	Yeovil Town	46	12	15	19	41	66	−25	51	
18	Stockport County	46	16	12	18	59	57	+2	50 (Note: Stockport County deducted 10 points for entering administration.)	
19	Hartlepool United	46	13	11	22	66	79	−13	50	
20	Carlisle United	46	12	14	20	56	69	−13	50	
21	Northampton Town (R)	46	12	13	21	61	65	−4	49	Relegation to Football League Two
22	Crewe Alexandra (R)	46	12	10	24	59	82	−23	46	Relegation to Football League Two
23	Cheltenham Town (R)	46	9	12	25	51	91	−40	39	Relegation to Football League Two
24	Hereford United (R)	46	9	7	30	42	79	−37	34	Relegation to Football League Two

Updated to match(es) played on 2 May 2009. Source: The Football League
Rules for classification: 1) points; 2) goal difference; 3) number of goals scored.
(C) Champions; (O) Play-off winners; (P) Promoted; (R) Relegated
Notes:

Leading goalscorer: Simon Cox (Swindon Town) – 29, and Rickie Lambert (Bristol Rovers) – 29

=== Football League Two ===
Brentford made a return to League One as champions, the second club to win the fourth tier three times since Doncaster Rovers. Exeter won their second successive promotion, and on the final day of the season managed to pip Wycombe Wanderers for the runners-up spot. Wycombe themselves managed the final automatic promotion spot by virtue of a single goal over Bury. The play-offs were won by Gillingham, who made an immediate return to League One after the previous season's relegation.

Several teams suffered heavy points deductions during the season. Rotherham were docked 17 points at the start of the season and Darlington 10 points later on. Without these penalties they would have both qualified for the play-offs, but instead managed only mid table. Bournemouth also suffered a 17-point deduction pre-season, and halfway through it looked to be enough to cost them their League status; however, a fightback under new manager Eddie Howe saw them climb to safety and secure survival with a game to spare.

Luton suffered the heaviest deduction however, and the loss of 30 points proved too much for them to survive (though they would still have been relegated, albeit while finishing a place higher, had they only suffered the same 17-point deduction as Bournemouth and Rotherham). They suffered four back-to-back seasons without getting promoted and dropped out of the league, making them only the third English team to suffer a hat-trick of relegations, and the first to drop from the second tier to the Conference in successive years. The other relegated team was Chester City, who were statistically the worst team in the division and returned to the Conference after only five years. This would ultimately be the final season that the club completed, as they folded in March 2010, before the end of the following campaign. Grimsby would also have suffered relegation, if not for Luton's points deduction.

Pos	Team	Pld	W	D	L	GF	GA	GD	Pts	Promotion, qualification or relegation
1	Brentford (C, P)	46	23	16	7	65	36	+29	85	Promotion to Football League One
2	Exeter City (P)	46	22	13	11	65	50	+15	79	Promotion to Football League One
3	Wycombe Wanderers (P)	46	20	18	8	54	33	+21	78	Promotion to Football League One
4	Bury	46	21	15	10	63	43	+20	78	Qualification for League Two play-offs
5	Gillingham (O, P)	46	21	12	13	58	55	+3	75	Qualification for League Two play-offs
6	Rochdale	46	19	13	14	70	59	+11	70	Qualification for League Two play-offs
7	Shrewsbury Town	46	17	18	11	61	44	+17	69	Qualification for League Two play-offs
8	Dagenham & Redbridge	46	19	11	16	77	53	+24	68	
9	Bradford City	46	18	13	15	66	55	+11	67	
10	Chesterfield	46	16	15	15	62	57	+5	63	
11	Morecambe	46	15	18	13	53	56	−3	63	
12	Darlington	46	20	12	14	61	44	+17	62 (Note: Darlington deducted 10 points for entering administration.)	
13	Lincoln City	46	14	17	15	53	52	+1	59	
14	Rotherham United	46	21	12	13	60	46	+14	58 (Note: Rotherham United deducted 17 points for leaving administration without a Company Voluntary Agreement.)	
15	Aldershot Town	46	14	12	20	59	80	−21	54	
16	Accrington Stanley	46	13	11	22	42	59	−17	50	
17	Barnet	46	11	15	20	56	74	−18	48	
18	Port Vale	46	13	9	24	44	66	−22	48	
19	Notts County	46	11	14	21	49	69	−20	47	
20	Macclesfield Town	46	13	8	25	45	77	−32	47	
21	Bournemouth	46	17	12	17	59	51	+8	46 (Note: Bournemouth deducted 17 points for leaving administration without a Company Voluntary Agreement.)	
22	Grimsby Town	46	9	14	23	51	69	−18	41	
23	Chester City (R)	46	8	13	25	43	81	−38	37	Relegated to Conference National
24	Luton Town (R)	46	13	17	16	58	65	−7	26 (Note: Luton Town deducted 30 points; 20 points for leaving administration without a Company Voluntary Agreement, and 10 points for making illegal payments to agents.)	Relegated to Conference National

Source: The Football League
Rules for classification: 1) points; 2) goal difference; 3) number of goals scored.
(C) Champions; (O) Play-off winners; (P) Promoted; (R) Relegated
Notes:

Leading goalscorers: Simeon Jackson (Gillingham) – 20, Grant Holt (Shrewsbury Town) – 20, and Jack Lester (Chesterfield) – 20

=== Movements for the 2009–10 season ===
Competition	Promoted	Playoffs	Relegated
Premier League	N/A	N/A	Newcastle, Middlesbrough, West Bromwich Albion
Football League Championship	Wolverhampton Wanderers, Birmingham City	Burnley	Charlton Athletic, Southampton, Norwich City
Football League One	Leicester City, Peterborough United	Scunthorpe United	Northampton Town, Crewe Alexandra, Cheltenham Town, Hereford United
Football League Two	Brentford, Exeter City, Wycombe Wanderers	Gillingham	Chester City, Luton Town
Conference National	Burton Albion	Torquay United	Woking, Northwich Victoria, Weymouth, Lewes
Conference North	Tamworth	Gateshead	King's Lynn (demoted), Burscough, Hucknall Town
Conference South	AFC Wimbledon	Hayes & Yeading United	Team Bath (folded), Bognor Regis Town, Fisher Athletic

=== Clubs removed ===
- Team Bath (Conference South)
- Gresley Rovers (Northern Premier League, Division One South)

== Women's football ==
=== Women's Premier League ===
==== National Division ====
Pos	Team	Pld	W	D	L	GF	GA	GD	Pts	Qualification or relegation
1	Arsenal (C)	22	20	1	1	89	14	+75	61	Qualification for the Champions League knockout phase
2	Everton	22	20	1	1	68	10	+58	61	Qualification for the Champions League qualifying round
3	Chelsea	22	16	2	4	55	23	+32	50	
4	Doncaster Rovers Belles	22	9	6	7	43	36	+7	33	
5	Birmingham City	22	10	3	9	39	43	−4	33	
6	Leeds Carnegie	22	8	4	10	32	40	−8	28	
7	Watford	22	7	4	11	31	40	−9	25	
8	Bristol Academy	22	5	8	9	39	49	−10	23	
9	Blackburn Rovers	22	5	3	14	27	52	−25	18	
10	Nottingham Forest	22	5	2	15	25	59	−34	17	
11	Liverpool (R)	22	4	4	14	28	63	−35	16	Relegation to the Northern Division
12	Fulham (R)	22	1	6	15	17	64	−47	9	Relegation to the Southern Division

Source: FA WPL
(C) Champions; (R) Relegated

==== Northern Division ====
Pos	Team	Pld	W	D	L	GF	GA	GD	Pts	Promotion or relegation
1	Sunderland (C, P)	22	17	2	3	95	16	+79	53	Promotion to the National Division
2	OOH Lincoln	22	16	4	2	79	15	+64	52	
3	Manchester City	22	13	4	5	42	22	+20	43	
4	Newcastle United	22	12	5	5	58	28	+30	41	
5	Leicester City	22	12	4	6	54	33	+21	40	
6	Reading	22	9	6	7	43	31	+12	33	Moved to the Southern Division
7	Aston Villa	22	10	2	10	49	50	−1	32	
8	Preston North End	22	7	3	12	37	51	−14	24	
9	Sheffield Wednesday	22	6	0	16	37	72	−35	18	
10	Curzon Ashton	22	4	4	14	35	70	−35	16	
11	Tranmere Rovers (R)	22	4	2	16	28	76	−48	14	Relegation to the Northern Combination League
12	Rotherham United (R)	22	3	2	17	17	110	−93	11	Relegation to the Midland Combination League

Source: FA WPL
Rules for classification: 1) Points; 2) Goal difference; 3) Number of goals scored
(C) Champions; (P) Promoted; (R) Relegated

==== Southern Division ====
Pos	Team	Pld	W	D	L	GF	GA	GD	Pts	Promotion or relegation
1	Millwall Lionesses (C, P)	22	17	3	2	61	14	+47	54	Promotion to the National Division
2	Barnet	22	11	7	4	58	33	+25	40	
3	West Ham United	22	10	9	3	41	20	+21	39	
4	Charlton Athletic	22	10	6	6	37	28	+9	36	
5	Portsmouth	22	10	5	7	50	35	+15	35	
6	Colchester United	22	8	6	8	37	41	−4	30	
7	Cardiff City	22	8	5	9	40	38	+2	29	
8	Keynsham Town	22	8	3	11	34	49	−15	27	
9	Crystal Palace	22	5	8	9	31	43	−12	23	
10	Brighton & Hove Albion	22	5	5	12	28	44	−16	20	
11	Ipswich Town (R)	22	5	3	14	19	64	−45	18	Relegation to the South East Combination League
12	Truro City (R)	22	3	4	15	31	58	−27	13	Relegation to the South West Combination League

Source: FA WPL
Rules for classification: 1) Points; 2) Goal difference; 3) Number of goals scored
(C) Champions; (P) Promoted; (R) Relegated

=== FA Women's Cup ===
==== Final ====
4 May 2009
13:00 BST

Arsenal	2–1	Sunderland
Chapman 32'; Little 90+2'	Report	McDougall 90+7'

Pride Park Stadium, Derby
Attendance: 23,291
Referee: Saša Ihringová (Shropshire)

== Notable debutants ==
- 1 November 2008 – Jordan Henderson, 18-year-old midfielder, makes his debut as a substitute in Sunderland's 5–0 Premier League defeat at Chelsea.

== Retirements ==
- 14 July 2008 – Neil Moss, 33, former Bournemouth goalkeeper.
- 20 August 2008 – Alan Stubbs, 36, former Bolton Wanderers, Celtic, Everton, Sunderland and Derby County defender.
- 28 August 2008 – Andy Cooke, 34, former Burnley, Stoke City, Bradford City, Darlington and Shrewsbury Town striker.
- 3 September 2008 – Rob Clare, 25, former Stockport County and Blackpool defender.
- 3 September 2008 – Antti Niemi, 36, former Southampton and Fulham goalkeeper.
- 25 September 2008 – Christian Roberts, 28, former Cardiff City, Exeter City, Bristol City and Swindon striker.
- 3 October 2008 – Damien Francis, 29, former Wimbledon, Norwich City, Wigan Athletic and Watford defensive midfielder.
- 11 November 2008 – Andy Cole, 37, former Arsenal, Fulham, Bristol City, Newcastle United, Manchester United, Manchester City, Portsmouth, Sunderland, Birmingham City, Burnley and Nottingham Forest striker.
- 6 December 2008 – Darren Anderton, 36, former Portsmouth, Tottenham Hotspur, Birmingham City, Wolverhampton Wanderers and Bournemouth attacking midfielder.
- 6 January 2009 – Paul Mitchell, 27, former Wigan Athletic, Halifax Town, Swindon, Wrexham, Barnet and Milton Keynes Dons defender and midfielder.
- 21 January 2009 – Shane Tudor, 26, former Wolverhampton Wanderers, Cambridge United, Leyton Orient and Port Vale winger.
- 22 April 2009 – Andy Booth, 35, former Huddersfield Town, Sheffield Wednesday and Tottenham Hotspur striker.
- 25 April 2009 – Fabian Wilnis, 38, former Ipswich Town and Grays Athletic defender.
- 15 May 2009 – Martin Laursen, 31, former Aston Villa defender.
- End of season – Richie Barker, 34, former Doncaster Rovers, Brighton & Hove Albion, Macclesfield Town, Mansfield Town, Hartlepool United and Rotherham United striker.

== Deaths ==
- 3 July 2008 – Ernie Cooksey, 28, Grays Athletic midfielder, who died from skin cancer. Earlier in his career, he played for Oldham Athletic, Rochdale, Crawley Town and Boston United.
- 26 July 2008 – Gerry Lightowler, 67, former Bradford Park Avenue and Bradford City full back.
- 8 August 2008 – Selwyn Whalley, 74, former Port Vale defender, played 196 games in a 15-year association with the club.
- 9 August 2008 – Ken Griffiths, 78, former striker who played for Port Vale, Mansfield Town, and a host of lower league clubs.
- 26 August 2008 – Bob Mountford, 56, former striker who played for a number of lower-league clubs in the 1970s, most notably Port Vale, Rochdale, Huddersfield Town and Halifax Town.
- 28 August 2008 – Ronnie Briggs, 65, former goalkeeper who began his career at Manchester United, and later played for Swansea Town and Bristol Rovers. Capped twice by Northern Ireland.
- 4 September 2008 – Tommy Johnston, 81, former striker who is Leyton Orient's all-time top scorer with 123 goals. Other clubs include Norwich City, Newport County and Blackburn Rovers.
- 6 September 2008 – Bill Shorthouse, 86, former Wolverhampton Wanderers defender and vice-captain, who played 376 games for the club in their heyday of the 1940s and 1950s.
- 25 September 2008 – Jimmy Sirrel, 86, former Notts County manager who took the Magpies from the Fourth Division to the First (pre-Premier League) during two spells at the club. Also managed Brentford and Sheffield United.
- 27 September 2008 – Jimmy Murray, 72, former Wolverhampton Wanderers striker who scored more than 150 goals for the club, and won two league championships and one FA Cup title while at Wolves. Also played for Manchester City and Walsall.
- 27 September 2008 – Len Browning, 80, former Leeds United and Sheffield United striker whose career was cut short by tuberculosis.
- 29 September 2008 – Tommy Northcott, 76, former Torquay United striker who scored over 120 goals for the club. Also played for Cardiff City and Lincoln City.
- 2 October 2008 – John Sjoberg, 67, former Leicester City central defender who spent 15 seasons at Filbert Street. Also played briefly for Rotherham United.
- 9 October 2008 – Bert Loxley, 74, former Notts County wing-half and Lincoln City manager.
- 21 October 2008 – George Edwards, 87, former Welsh international winger who began his career as an amateur at Swansea Town, and later played professionally for Birmingham City and Cardiff City.
- 23 October 2008 – Brian Hillier, 65, former chairman of Swindon Town.
- 27 October 2008 – Colin Gale, 76, former Northampton Town centre half who made over 200 appearances for the club between 1956 and 1961. Also played for Cardiff City.
- 1 November 2008 – Dermot Curtis, 76, former Republic of Ireland international striker who played for Bristol City, Ipswich Town, Exeter City and Torquay United. To date, he is the only Exeter player to have played at senior international level.
- 8 November 2008 – Régis Genaux, 35, former Belgian international full-back who played half a season for Coventry City, in 1996–97. Also played for Standard Liège in his home country, and Italian side Udinese.
- 17 November 2008 – Peter Aldis, 81, former Aston Villa left-back, who spent 12 seasons at Villa Park, and was a member the Villa side that won the 1957 FA Cup.
- 24 December 2008 – Ray Deakin, 49, former Burnley defender and captain. Also played for Port Vale and Bolton Wanderers.
- 27 December 2008 – Bert "Sailor" Brown, 93, former inside-forward who played for Aston Villa, Nottingham Forest and Charlton Athletic. Served in the Royal Air Force during World War II, and was an England wartime international.
- 31 December 2008 – Harry Oscroft, 82, former winger who played for Mansfield Town, Port Vale, and most notably Stoke City, where he scored 106 goals in 349 games during a ten-year spell at the club.
- 2 January 2009 – Ian Greaves, 76, former Manchester United full-back and Busby Babe who became a successful manager, most notably at Huddersfield Town, Bolton Wanderers and Mansfield Town, all of whom he guided to promotion.
- 5 January 2009 – Jimmy Rayner, 73, former striker who played for Grimsby Town, Peterborough United, Notts County and several non-league clubs. Scored an incredible 71 goals for non-league Grantham Town during the 1963–64 season.
- 6 January 2009 – Charlie Thomson, 78, former goalkeeper who played for Chelsea and Nottingham Forest. Won the league with Chelsea in 1954–55, and the FA Cup with Forest in 1959.
- 10 January 2009 – Jack Wheeler, 89, former goalkeeper with Birmingham City and Huddersfield Town, who became a trainer at Notts County for 26 years during two spells.
- 13 January 2009 – Tommy Casey, 78, former wing-half who most notably played for Newcastle United, where he won the 1955 FA Cup. Also played for Leeds United, Bournemouth, Portsmouth and Bristol City. Represented Northern Ireland in the 1958 World Cup.
- 20 January 2009 – Johnny Dixon, 85, former Aston Villa striker, who captained the side in the 1957 FA Cup Final, when they defeated Manchester United 2–1.
- 21 January 2009 – Vic Crowe, 76, former Aston Villa and Welsh international wing-half who spent 13 seasons at Villa Park as a player, and four years as manager. Also played for Peterborough United, and was an unused reserve in Wales' 1958 World Cup squad.
- 27 January 2009 – Aubrey Powell, 90, former Welsh international inside-forward who spent the majority of his club career at Leeds United, and also had spells at Everton and Birmingham City.
- 29 January 2009 – Roy Saunders, 78, former Liverpool and Swansea Town wing-half, who was later on Swansea's coaching staff. Never capped at senior level, but did play once for Great Britain XI against a "Rest of the World" team. Father of Dean Saunders.
- 2 February 2009 – Paul Birch, 46, former right-sided midfielder best known from his days at Aston Villa and Wolverhampton Wanderers. He also played for Doncaster Rovers, Exeter City and non-league Halesowen Town, and later worked as a coach at Forest Green Rovers and Birmingham City. Died from bone cancer.
- 7 February 2009 – Joe Haverty, 72, former Irish international winger who most notably played seven seasons for Arsenal, and also had spells at Blackburn Rovers, Millwall and several other clubs both in Britain and abroad. Capped 32 times by the Republic of Ireland.
- 9 February 2009 – Marc Burrows, 30, non-league striker and former Portsmouth trainee who is notable for scoring the fastest goal in football history in a reserve team match between Cowes Sports and Eastleigh in 2004.
- 9 February 2009 – Reg Davies, 79, former inside-forward who played for Southend United, Newcastle United, Swansea Town and Carlisle United, and was capped six times by Wales.
- 9 February 2009 – Neville Hamilton, 48, former Leicester City, Mansfield Town and Rochdale midfielder who had to retire at age 24 following a heart attack, and later spent many years as youth team coach at Leicester City.
- 15 February 2009 – Don Leeson, 73, former Barnsley goalkeeper, who later became a policeman.
- 2 March 2009 – Andy Bowman, 74, former Chelsea and Newport County wing-half, who also played for Hearts in his native Scotland.
- 4 March 2009 – Harry Parkes, 89, former full-back who spent his entire 18-year career at Aston Villa, where he played almost 350 games. Called up by the England national football team in 1946, but never capped.
- 7 March 2009 – Jimmy Hernon, 84, former winger who played for Leicester City, Bolton Wanderers, Grimsby Town and Watford.
- 9 March 2009 – Eddie Lowe, 83, former Aston Villa and Fulham wing-half, who played three times for England in 1947. Played 511 games for Fulham, and retired as the club's all-time appearance record holder (later broken by Johnny Haynes).
- 16 March 2009 – Alan Suddick, 64, former midfielder who most notably played for Newcastle United and Blackpool, and was capped by England at under-23 level. Known as a free-kick specialist.
- 29 March 2009 – Hugh Kelly, 85, former wing-half who spent his entire career at Blackpool, playing 428 league games for the Seasiders. Missed the famous "Matthews Final" in 1953 because of injury. Capped once by Scotland.
- 11 April 2009 – Jimmy Neighbour, 58, former Tottenham Hotspur, Norwich City and West Ham United winger. Was a member of the Tottenham side that won the 1971 League Cup.
- 12 April 2009 – Mike Keen, 69, former Queens Park Rangers, Luton Town and Watford midfielder who played nearly 700 league games in a 16-year career. Was player-manager at Watford, and also managed Northampton Town and Wycombe Wanderers.
- 19 April 2009 – Dicky Robinson, 82, former defender who played more than 400 games for Middlesbrough in the early post-war years, and played five times for the English Football League representative side. Also played for Barrow.
- 3 May 2009 – John Elsworthy, 77, former Ipswich Town wing-half, who spent 16 years at the club, and was part of Ipswich's 1961–62 league championship winning side. Was a reserve for Wales' 1958 World Cup squad, but was in fact never capped at any level.
- 3 May 2009 – Tommy Fowler, 84, former Northampton Town winger who played a club-record 521 league games for the club between 1946 and 1961. Also played for Aldershot.
- 4 May 2009 – Bobby Campbell, 86, former Scottish international who played as a winger for Falkirk, Chelsea and Reading, before going on to manage Dumbarton and Bristol Rovers.
- 14 May 2009 – Ken Hollyman, 86, former defender who played for Cardiff City and Newport County, making over 400 league appearances.
- 16 May 2009 – Peter Sampson, 81, former wing-half who made 340 league appearances for Bristol Rovers, his only professional club, between 1948 and 1961.
- 20 May 2009 – Alan Kelly, 72, former Preston North End goalkeeper who played a club-record 447 league games for the Lilywhites, and was capped 47 times by the Republic of Ireland. His sons Gary and Alan Jr also became professional goalkeepers.
- 25 May 2009 – Billy Baxter, 70, former Ipswich Town defender who spent eleven seasons at Portman Road, and was a member of the side that won the league championship in 1961–62. Also played for Hull City, Watford and Northampton Town.
- 23 June 2009 – Jackie Swindells, 72, former striker who is Altrincham's all-time top goalscorer with 195 goals in the Northern Premier League. Began his career at Manchester City, and also played for Blackburn Rovers, Accrington Stanley and Workington.
