= Kangaskorpi =

Surname list

Kangaskorpi is a Finnish surname. Notable people with the surname include:

- Jokke Kangaskorpi (1972–2009), Finnish footballer
- Juuso Kangaskorpi (born 1975), Finnish footballer and manager
