= Giovanni Córdoba =

Colombian footballer (1978–2002)

- Córdoba with Deportivo Cali

Personal information
- Full name: Giovanni Córdoba Rentería
- Date of birth: 16 March 1978
- Place of birth: Cali, Colombia
- Date of death: 27 October 2002 (aged 24)
- Place of death: Cali, Colombia
- Position: Striker

Youth career
- Atlético Nacional
- Cortuluá
- Deportivo Cali

Senior career*
Years	Team	Apps	(Gls)
1996–2002	Deportivo Cali	154	(48)
2000	→ L.D.U. Quito (loan)	28	(4)
Total		182	(52)

International career
1997	Colombia U20		
2000	Colombia U23		
- * Club domestic league appearances and goals

Giovanni Córdoba Rentería (16 March 1978 – 27 October 2002) was a Colombian footballer who played professionally for Deportivo Cali, as well as for Ecuadorian club L.D.U. Quito.

== Club career ==
Having progressed through the academy of Deportivo Cali, he went on to score 48 goals in 154 games for the club, also spending time on loan in Ecuador with Quito.

== Death ==
During a training session with Deportivo Cali in Pance, Cali on 24 October 2002, lightning struck a post and bounced onto the pitch the players were using, with three players unable to return to their feet - Córdoba, Hernán Gaviria and Carlos Álvarez. Following the incident, five players were taken to the Fundación Valle del Lili Hospital, where Gaviria was declared dead two hours after arrival. Córdoba, Álvarez and Giovanni Hernández remained in intensive care, though Córdoba died three days later.

== Personal life ==
His brother Hernan Córdoba was also a footballer. He died on 20 September 2009 in a road accident with his teammate Mario Beltrán. He also had a son.

== See also ==
- List of association footballers who died while playing
