= Youssef El Bai =

French footballer (1978–2009)

Youssef Elbai
Personal information
- Full name: Youssef El Bai
- Date of birth: June 5, 1978
- Place of birth: Argenteuil, France
- Date of death: May 22, 2009 (aged 30)
- Height: 1.80 m (5 ft 11 in)
- Position: Defender

Senior career*
Years	Team	Apps	(Gls)
1995–1998	Nantes B	36	(4)
1998–1999	Gazélec Ajaccio	30	(0)
1999–2000	Chamois Niortais	18	(0)
2000–2002	RCF Paris	44	(0)
2002–2004	Laval	0	(0)
2004–2005	Carquefou	19	(4)
2005–2006	Épinal	16	(0)
2006–2007	Cassis Carnoux	16	(0)
2007–2008	Ivry	?	(?)
2008–2009	Orly	?	(?)
- * Club domestic league appearances and goals

Youssef El Bai (June 6, 1978 – May 22, 2009) was a footballer, who last played for Division d'Honneur side AS Orly. He played as a right-back.
