= Otto Bresling =

Danish footballer (1921–2009

Personal information
- Full name: Otto Viggo Bresling
- Date of birth: 11 January 1921
- Place of birth: Copenhagen, Denmark
- Date of death: 17 July 2009 (aged 88)
- Position: Midfielder

International career
Years	Team	Apps	(Gls)
1940	Denmark	1	(0)

Otto Bresling (11 January 1921 – 17 July 2009) was a Danish footballer. He played in one match for the Denmark national football team in 1940.
