= Christoph Budde =

German footballer

Personal information
- Date of birth: 11 February 1963
- Place of birth: Erkelenz, West Germany
- Date of death: 1 December 2009 (aged 46)
- Place of death: Mönchengladbach, Germany
- Height: 1.78 m (5 ft 10 in)
- Position: Striker

Senior career*
Years	Team	Apps	(Gls)
1985–1990	Borussia Mönchengladbach	42	(4)
- * Club domestic league appearances and goals

Christoph Budde (11 February 1963 – 1 December 2009) was a German professional footballer who made 42 appearances in the Bundesliga for Borussia Mönchengladbach as a striker between 1985 and 1990.

He died on 1 December 2009 of swine flu, aged 46.
