= Heinz Versteeg =

German-born Dutch footballer

Personal information
- Date of birth: 24 March 1939
- Place of birth: Netherlands
- Date of death: 15 October 2009 (aged 70)
- Place of death: Rheinsberg, Germany
- Position: Striker

Senior career*
Years	Team	Apps	(Gls)
1957–1963	Meidericher SV II	136	(52)
1963–1966	Meidericher SV	63	(14)
1966–1970	Hamborn 07	111	(17)
Total		310	(83)
- * Club domestic league appearances and goals

Heinz Versteeg (24 March 1939 – 15 October 2009) was a Dutch professional footballer active primarily in Germany. Versteeg played as a striker for Meidericher SV and Hamborn 07.
