= Louis Leysen =

Belgian footballer (1932–2009)

Personal information
- Full name: Louis Carolus Leysen
- Date of birth: 22 January 1932
- Place of birth: Deurne, Belgium
- Date of death: 12 April 2009 (aged 77)
- Height: 1.88 m (6 ft 2 in)
- Position: Goalkeeper

Senior career*
| Years | Team | Apps | (Gls) |
- Berchem Sport

International career
| 1957–1958 | Belgium | 4 | (0) |
- * Club domestic league appearances and goals

Louis Carolus Leysen (22 January 1932 – 12 April 2009) was a Belgian footballer who played as a goalkeeper for Berchem Sport. He made four appearances for the Belgium national team from 1957 to 1958.
