= Knut Hammer Larsen =

Norwegian footballer (1971–2009)

Knut Hammer Larsen (12 April 1971 – 19 May 2009) was a Norwegian footballer who played as a midfielder.

== Career ==
Larsen grew up in Tasta, and played for POL, FK Vidar, Stavanger IF, Viking FK, Staal Jørpeland IL, Buøy IL, Djerv 1919, Tasta IL and Vardeneset BK. For Viking he played in the 1990 Tippeligaen and the 1990–91 European Cup Winners' Cup.

After retiring he worked in Lyse Energi. He lived in Stavanger and Randaberg, was married and had two children. He died in May 2009 at Rikshospitalet of leukemia, following several fruitless chemotherapy attempts.
