= Orane Simpson =

Jamaican footballer (1983-2009)

Personal information
- Date of birth: 4 September 1983
- Place of birth: Kingston, Jamaica
- Date of death: 13 October 2009 (aged 26)
- Place of death: Kingston, Jamaica
- Position: Midfielder

Senior career*
Years	Team	Apps	(Gls)
2005–2009	Tivoli Gardens		

International career^{‡}
2009	Jamaica	5	(0)
- * Club domestic league appearances and goals as of 14 October 2009 ‡ National team caps and goals as of 14 October 2009

Orane Simpson (4 September 1983 – 13 October 2009) was a Jamaican footballer.

== Club career ==
Simpson began his professional career with Tivoli Gardens F.C., and scored the winning goal in a final round victory over Arnett Gardens F.C. to lead the club to the 2009 Jamaica National Premier League title.

== International career ==
Simpson made a few appearances for the Jamaica national football team in friendlies that were part of the build-up to the 2009 CONCACAF Gold Cup.

== Death ==
Simpson was attacked and stabbed to death in Kingston, Jamaica, on 13 October 2009. Before the kick-off of each Jamaica league game on Sunday 18 October, a minute of silence was observed in his memory.
