= Július Nôta =

Slovak footballer

Personal information
- Date of birth: 3 April 1971
- Place of birth: Rimavská Sobota, Czechoslovakia
- Date of death: 20 February 2009 (aged 37)
- Place of death: Slovakia
- Position: Goalkeeper

Senior career*
| Years | Team | Apps | (Gls) |
| -1997 | Rimavská Sobota | | |
| 1997–1998 | Diósgyőri VTK | 31 | (0) |
| 1999 | Dunaferr | 8 | (0) |
| 1999–2000 | Zalaegerszeg | 1 | (0) |
| 2000–2001 | Budapest Honvéd | 17 | (0) |
| 2001–2002 | Vasas | 25 | (0) |
| 2003–???? | Rimavská Sobota | | |
- * Club domestic league appearances and goals

Július Nôta (3 April 1971 – 20 February 2009) was a Slovak professional footballer. Nota played as a goalkeeper in both Slovakia and Hungary for clubs including Rimavská Sobota, Diósgyőri VTK and Budapest Honvéd. While at Diósgyőri VTK, Nota was involved in match-fixing allegations. Nota died on 20 February 2009 at the age of 37, after being stabbed to death.
