= Vic Snell =

English footballer

Personal information
- Full name: Victor Derek Robert Snell
- Date of birth: 29 October 1927
- Place of birth: Samford, England
- Date of death: 20 August 2009 (aged 81)
- Place of death: Hounslow, England
- Position: Full back

Youth career
- –1949: Nicholians
- 1945–1949: Ipswich Town

Senior career*
Years	Team	Apps	(Gls)
1949–1963	Ipswich Town	64	(2)
1963	Port Elizabeth City	?	(?)
- * Club domestic league appearances and goals

Victor Derek Robert Snell (29 October 1927 – 20 August 2009) was an English professional footballer who played as a full back.

== Career ==
Born in Samford, Snell signed for Ipswich Town from Nicholians in 1945. He turned professional in 1947 and made his debut in 1949. His last appearance for Ipswich came in 1959, although he stayed with the club as a registered player until 1963. In total, Snell made 62 appearances for Ipswich in the Football League, scoring 2 goals.

Between 1959 and 1963, Snell combined his playing duties with coaching duties, becoming a first-team coach at Ipswich.

Snell later played in South Africa for Port Elizabeth City.

== Later life and death ==
After retiring as a player, Snell lived in South Africa and Zimbabwe, before returning to England in 1992.

Snell died on 20 August 2009, at the age of 81, following a long illness.
