= Gerry Lightowler =

English footballer

Personal information
- Date of birth: 5 September 1940
- Place of birth: Bradford, England
- Date of death: 26 July 2008 (aged 67)
- Position: Left back

Senior career*
| Years | Team | Apps | (Gls) |
| 1958–1968 | Bradford Park Avenue | 208 | (1) |
| 1968 | Los Angeles Wolves | 28 | (3) |
| 1968–1969 | Bradford City | 11 | (0) |
- Guiseley
- * Club domestic league appearances and goals

Gerard A. Lightowler (5 September 1940 – 26 July 2008) was an English professional footballer, who played more than 200 games for his hometown club Bradford Park Avenue. He also played for Bradford City, Guiseley, and in the US with Los Angeles Wolves.

== Career ==
Lightowler was born in Bradford, England, on 5 September 1940 and attended St. Bede's Grammar School. He was a left back, who started his football career with one of his hometown clubs, Bradford Park Avenue. He signed amateur forms with Park Avenue in 1958, making his first team debut in the final game of the 1958–59 season when Avenue defeated Aldershot 5–1. In September 1961, Lightowler signed his first full-time professional contract with Avenue, before going on to play 229 league and cup games with the club, during which time he scored two goals, one in the league and another in the FA Cup. Of his games, 208 were in the league.

In March 1968, Lightowler left Park Avenue to move to the US, where he joined North American Soccer League side Los Angeles Wolves. He spent just seven months in the United States where he played 28 games, scoring three goals, before he returned to Bradford, after signing for Division Four team Bradford City under the management of Jimmy Wheeler. City finished fourth during the 1968–69 season, earning promotion to Division Three. However, Lightowler was released during the summer having played just 12 games, 11 of which were in the league, for City. Following his release, he joined nearby non-league club Guiseley.

== Personal life ==
Lightowler was married to Sandra. He was also interested in cricket and was a steward and committee member of Gomersal Cricket Club, in Gomersal, West Yorkshire. He was also a keen amateur golfer and organised and played in the cricket club's annual golf event. Since his death the golf tournament has been renamed 'The Gerry Lightowler memorial' and the winner receives a silver trophy in his honour.

He died in July 2008 at the age of 67. Following his death, his former teammate Bobby Ham, with whom he played at both Bradford clubs, described him as "a great lad with a fantastic sense of humour".
