= Joop Wille =

Dutch footballer

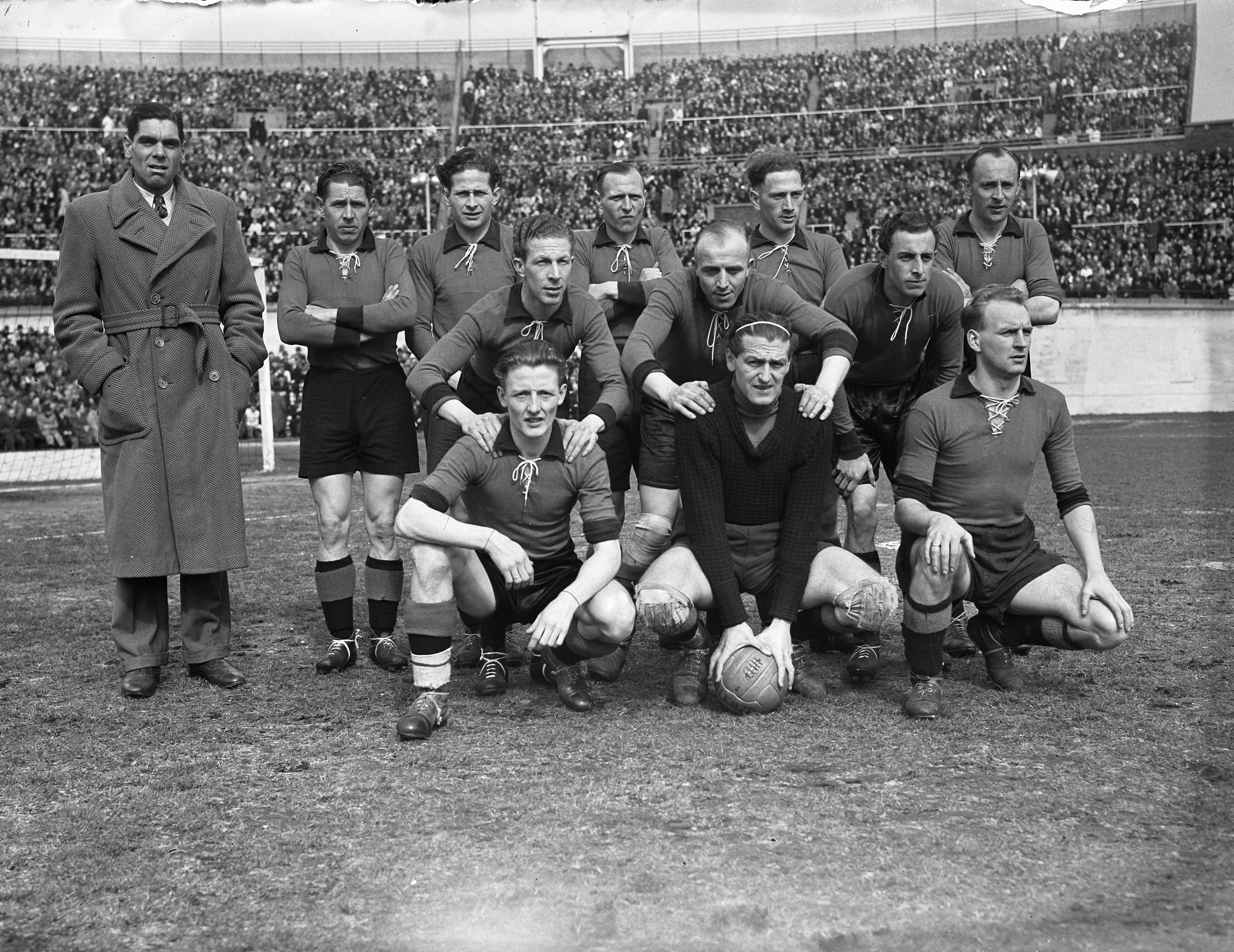

Personal information
- Date of birth: 16 September 1920
- Place of birth: Haarlem, Netherlands
- Date of death: 16 January 2009 (aged 88)
- Place of death: Haarlem, Netherlands
- Position: Goalkeeper

Senior career*
Years	Team	Apps	(Gls)
- EDO

International career
1940	Netherlands	1	(0)
- * Club domestic league appearances and goals

Joop Wille (16 September 1920 – 16 January 2009) was a Dutch international footballer who played club football for EDO. Born in Haarlem, Wille died on 16 January 2009, at the age of 88.
