= Hernan Córdoba =

Colombian footballer (1989-2009)

Hernán Córdoba
Personal information
- Full name: Hernán Córdoba Rentería
- Date of birth: 2 November 1989
- Place of birth: Palmira, Colombia
- Date of death: 20 September 2009 (aged 19)
- Place of death: Rivera, Colombia
- Height: 1.70 m (5 ft 7 in)
- Position: Striker

Youth career
- Olimpia Fútbol Club de Palmira

Senior career*
Years	Team	Apps	(Gls)
2006–2009	Deportivo Cali	73	(13)
2007	→ Córdoba (loan)	2	(1)
2009	Atlético Huila	9	(7)

International career
2007	Colombia U-17	7	(0)
2009	Colombia U-20	5	(0)
- * Club domestic league appearances and goals

Hernán Córdoba Rentería (2 November 1989 – 20 September 2009) was a Colombian footballer who played as a striker or attacking midfielder for Atlético Huila in the Categoría Primera A.

== Club career ==
Córdoba began his career with Olimpia Fútbol Club de Palmira and in 2006 was scouted by Deportivo Cali, then in January 2007 he joined Córdoba on a short-loan, returning to Cali in July 2007. After a few years with Deportivo Cali, he joined Atlético Huila in January 2009 and in summer 2009, because of his great performances, was linked with SV Werder Bremen. He played his last match for Huila in a 2–1 victory against Deportivo Pereira on 19 September 2009.

== International career ==
Córdoba was a member of the Colombia national football team at Under-17 and Under-20 level.

== Death ==
On 20 September 2009, while returning to the city of Neiva after a victory against Deportivo Pereira along with his teammate Mario Beltrán, Renteria along with his teammate were involved in a car accident with a bus, and died immediately on impact.

== Personal ==
Herman was the brother of footballer Giovanni Córdoba who died in 2002 after being hit by a lightning strike during a training session.
