= Altrincham F.C. =

Association football club in Greater Manchester, England

Altrincham
- Full name: Altrincham Football Club
- Nickname: The Robins
- Founded: 1891
- Ground: Moss Lane, Altrincham
- Capacity: 7,873 (1,323 seated)
- Executive Chair: Mark Luby
- Manager: Neil Gibson
- League: National League
- 2025–26: National League, 13th of 24
- Website: altrinchamfc.com
Home colours	Away colours

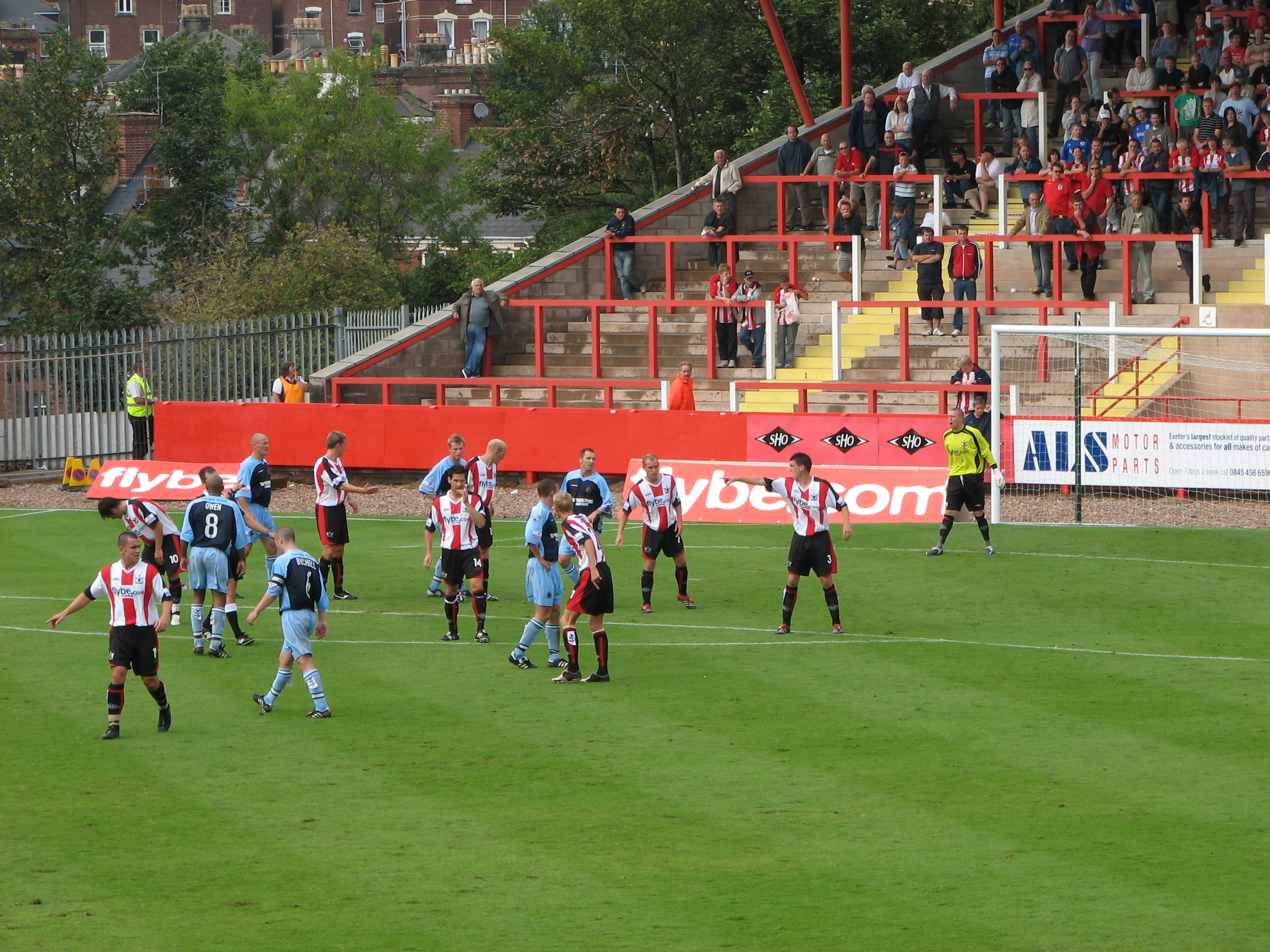
Exeter City vs Altrincham in a Conference National fixture played on 19 August 2006

Altrincham Football Club is a professional football club based in Altrincham, Greater Manchester, England. Founded in 1891 and nicknamed "the Robins", they are currently members of the National League, the fifth tier of English football, and play at Moss Lane.

== History ==
Altrincham was established by a Sunday school around 1891 as Rigby Memorial Club. They soon merged with another local team, Grapplers, to form Broadheath Football Club, and were founder members of the Manchester League in 1893. Their first match in the league on 16 September 1893 saw them lose 7–0 to Hulme, and they went on to lose 14 of the remaining league matches as they finished bottom of the table.

After playing at various grounds in Broadheath, Timperley and Altrincham, the club moved to Pollitt's Field in 1903, at which point they changed their name to Altrincham. They won the Cheshire Amateur Cup in their first season under the new name, and went on to win both the Manchester League and the Cheshire Senior Cup the following season. They won the Manchester League again in 1906–07, and moved to their current Moss Lane ground in 1910.

In 1911 the club joined Division Two of the Lancashire Combination. They finished as runners-up in their first season in the division, only missing out on the title on goal average and earning promotion to Division One. They remained in Division One until World War I. When football resumed in 1919, the club were founder members of the Cheshire County League, where they remained until World War II, the highlights being finishing as runners-up in 1934–35 and 1935–36 and a League Cup win in 1932–33. In 1934–35 they reached the first round of the FA Cup for the first time, losing the subsequent game 1–0 to Gainsborough Trinity.

After missing out the 1945–46 season, they rejoined the Cheshire County League in 1946, achieving little success until the 1960s, when Altrincham director Noel White hired Freddie Pye as manager. A key turning point in the history of the club is often cited as the signing of Jackie Swindells in 1965, who in his first full season (1965–66) scored 82 goals. helping Altrincham to the first of back-to-back Cheshire County League titles, scoring over 120 goals in the league in both seasons. After finishing as runners-up in 1967–68, they were founder members of the Northern Premier League in 1968.

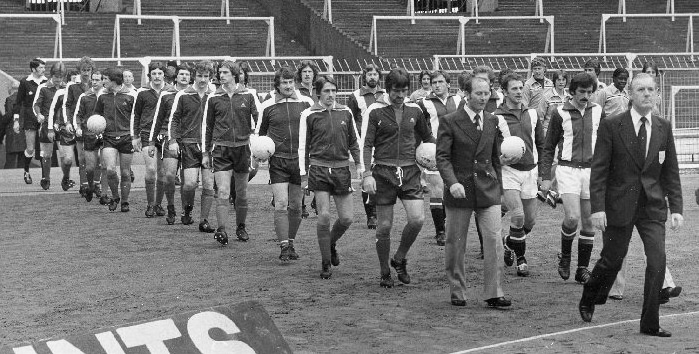
Altrincham vs Leatherhead, FA Trophy final at Wembley Stadium, April 1978

They reached the semi-finals of the FA Trophy in 1976–77, losing 2–1 to Scarborough in a second replay; the season also saw them apply for election to the Football League for the first time, but they received only 12 votes compared to the 27 received by the elected Wimbledon. The following season they went one better in the FA Trophy, reaching the Wembley final, where they beat Leatherhead 3–1. In 1978–79 they finished as runners-up in the Northern Premier League and applied for election to the Football League again. Although they finished as the top non-League club in the ballot, they received only 13 votes to the 37 received by Halifax Town, the lowest-placed Football League club. Instead, Altrincham became founder members of the Alliance Premier League, the top level of non-League football, the winner of which would be the sole non-League nomination for future Football League election ballots.

The league's inaugural season saw Altrincham crowned champions. In the subsequent elections to the Football League, the club missing out by a single vote, receiving 25 to Rochdale's 26; this was considered especially unfortunate as the club had been promised the votes of Grimsby Town and Luton Town, but the Grimsby representative was prevented from voting by being in the wrong part of the meeting room, whilst the Luton representative arrived too late after a mix-up over the start time.

Altrincham retained the APL title the following season, but again failed in the Football League elections, this time only receiving 15 votes to the 41 received by Halifax, who were again the lowest ranked Football League club. The next two seasons saw the club finish in mid-table, together with another FA Trophy final appearance in 1981–82, this time losing 1–0 to Enfield. This was followed by four consecutive top-five finishes between 1984 and 1987 and a second FA Trophy win in 1985, beating Runcorn 1–0 in the final. The 1985–86 season saw them record one of the biggest FA Cup giant-killings of all time when they defeated top division Birmingham City 2–1 at Birmingham's St Andrew's.

The club then returned to mid-table with occasional successful seasons, finishing third in 1990–91 (by which time the league had become the Football Conference) and fourth in 1994–95. After finishing bottom of the Conference in 1996–97 the club were relegated to the Premier Division of the Northern Premier League. An eighth-place finish in 1997–98 saw them return to the Conference two seasons later as Premier Division champions. However, they lasted only a single season in the Conference as they finished second-from-bottom and were relegated back to the Northern Premier League.

Chart of yearly table positions of Altrincham since being a founder member of the Alliance Premier League.

A twelfth-place finish in 2003–04 saw them qualify for the newly formed Conference North. They finished fifth in the new division in its first season, qualifying for the promotion play-offs. After defeating Nuneaton Borough 4–2 on penalties following a 1–1 draw and then Kettering Town 3–2, they were promoted to the Conference National division with a 2–1 win over Eastbourne Borough in the north–south final played at the Britannia Stadium.

In 2005–06 Altrincham finished bottom of the Conference National after receiving an 18-point deduction when they were found to have fielded an ineligible player, James Robinson, for 15 matches, during which he scored six goals and Altrincham won 18 points. However, they were reprieved from relegation after Canvey Island resigned from the league and Scarborough were demoted. The following season they again finished in the relegation zone, but were reprieved after Boston United were demoted. A third successive relegation reprieve occurred in 2007–08 when Halifax were liquidated.

After mid-table finishes in 2008–09 and 2009–10 and Ricky Ponting becoming a shareholder of the club in 2009, Altrincham were relegated to the Conference North at the end of the 2010–11 season. In 2012–13 a fourth-place finish saw them qualify for the promotion play-offs, in which they lost 4–2 on aggregate to Brackley Town. However, after finishing fourth the following season, they beat Hednesford Town 4–3 on aggregate in the semi-finals and then defeated Guiseley 2–1 in the final to earn promotion back to the Conference National. In 2015–16 the club finished in the relegation zone and were relegated to the renamed National League North. The following season they finished bottom of the National League North, leading to a second successive relegation to the Premier Division of the Northern Premier League. However, the 2017–18 season saw the club win the Northern Premier League title, earning promotion back to the National League North.

In 2018–19 Altrincham finished fifth in the National League North, earning a place in the play-offs; in the quarter finals, they drew 2–2 with Blyth Spartans before winning 7–6 in a penalty shootout, setting up a semi-final tie with Chorley, which they lost 3–1 on penalties after a 1–1 draw. The following season ended with a sixth-place finish, resulting in another play-off campaign. After defeating Chester 3–2 and York City 2–0, the club beat Boston United 1–0 in the final, earning promotion to the National League. In May 2022 the club announced they would transition to full-time professional status for the first time in their history. In 2023–24 they finished fourth in the National League, before losing 3–1 to Bromley in the play-off semi-finals.

=== FA Cup giant-killers ===
Altrincham have a history of giant-killing in the FA Cup, holding the record of knocking out more Football League sides than any other club that has spent its entire history playing in non-League. They reached the third round of the FA Cup in four consecutive seasons between 1978–79 and 1981–82, holding a better record in the competition than any club playing in the Third or Fourth divisions during this period. To date the club has recorded seventeen victories against Football League clubs:

1. 1921–22: Tranmere Rovers defeated 4–2 in the fourth qualifying round
2. 1965–66: Rochdale defeated 3–1 in the second round
3. 1973–74: Hartlepool defeated 2–1 in the first round
4. 1974–75: Scunthorpe United defeated 3–1 in a first round replay
5. 1979–80: Crewe Alexandra defeated 3–0 in the first round
6. 1979–80: Rotherham United defeated 2–0 in the second round
7. 1980–81: Scunthorpe United defeated 1–0 in a second round replay
8. 1981–82: Sheffield United defeated 3–0 in a first round replay
9. 1981–82: York City defeated 4–3 in a second round replay
10. 1982–83: Rochdale defeated 2–1 in the first round
11. 1984–85: Blackpool defeated 1–0 in the first round
12. 1985–86: Blackpool defeated 2–1 in the second round
13. 1985–86: Birmingham City defeated 2–1 in the third round
14. 1988–89: Lincoln City defeated 3–2 in the first round
15. 1992–93: Chester City defeated 2–0 in a second round replay
16. 1994–95: Wigan Athletic defeated 1–0 in the second round
17. 2015–16: Barnsley defeated 1–0 in the first round

== Current squad ==
As of 20 Novermber 2026

Note: Flags indicate national team as defined under FIFA eligibility rules; some limited exceptions apply. Players may hold more than one non-FIFA nationality.

No.	Pos.	Nation	Player
1	GK	WAL	Owen Evans
2	DF	ENG	Lewis Banks
3	DF	WAL	Eddy Jones
4	MF	ENG	Jack Hinchy
5	DF	ENG	Jake Cooper
6	DF	ENG	Charlie Olson
7	FW	PAK	Otis Khan
8	MF	USA	Liam Humbles
9	FW	ENG	Kristian Dennis
10	MF	ENG	Aidan Barlow
11	FW	ENG	Jimmy Knowles
12	MF	ENG	Kian Breckin
13	GK	ENG	Andy Firth (player-coach)
14	FW	ENG	Matty Kosylo
15	FW	ENG	Sam Taylor

No.	Pos.	Nation	Player
16	MF	ENG	Remi Raymond
17	FW	ENG	Lucas Weaver
18	MF	ENG	Owen German
19	FW	ENG	Pharrell Brown
20	FW	ENG	Kahrel Reddin
21	DF	ENG	Reuben Lopata-White (on loan from Leeds United)
22	MF	ENG	Tom Crawford
23	FW	ENG	Charlie Kirk
24	DF	ENG	Sam Barnes
26	DF	IRL	Anthony Forde
28	FW	ENG	Kane Hemmings
29	FW	ENG	Courtney Baker-Richardson (on loan from Tranmere)
32	GK	ENG	Michael Acquah
34	GK	ENG	Harry Isted
39	FW	ENG	Leo Farrell (on loan from Barnsley)

=== Out on loan ===
Note: Flags indicate national team as defined under FIFA eligibility rules; some limited exceptions apply. Players may hold more than one non-FIFA nationality.

No.	Pos.	Nation	Player
25	DF	ENG	Joel Bailey (at FC United of Manchester)
27	GK	ENG	Louie Fallon (at Airbus UK Broughton)
32	GK	ENG	Max Beddow (at 1874 Northwich F.C.)

== First team staff ==
Role	Name
Manager	Neil Gibson
Assistant Manager	Lee Jones
Director of Football	John Coyne
Club Doctor	Dr Robert Jackson
Head of Medical	Thomas Cadman
Head of Physical Performance	Kyle Taylor
Performance Analyst	Mark Bushall
Kit Manager	Steven Foster
Kit Manager	Dylan Barlow
Goalkeeper Coach	Ben Williams

== Honours ==
- National League
  - Champions 1979–80, 1980–81
  - Bob Lord Trophy winners 1980–81
- Northern Premier League
  - Premier Division champions 1998–99, 2017–18
  - Challenge Cup winners 1969–70, 1997–98
  - Challenge Shield winners 1979–80, 1998–99
- Manchester League
  - Champions 1904–05, 1906–07
- Cheshire County League
  - Champions 1965–66, 1966–67
- FA Trophy
  - Winners 1977–78, 1985–86
- Cheshire Senior Cup
  - Winners 1904–05, 1933–34, 1966–67, 1981–82, 1998–99, 2004–05, 2008–09
  - League Cup winners 1932–33, 1950–51, 1963–64
- Cheshire Amateur Cup
  - Winners 1903–04
- Manchester and Salford Charity Cup
  - Winners 1908–09

== Records ==
- Best FA Cup performance: Fourth round, 1985–86
- Record attendance: 10,275, Altrincham Boys vs Sunderland Boys, 28 February 1925
- Record transfer fee paid: £15,000 to Blackpool for Keith Russell, 1998
- Record victory: 14–2 vs Sale Holmfield, Cheshire Amateur Cup, 5 December 1903
- Record defeat: 13–1 vs Stretford, 4 November 1893
- Most appearances: Stuart Coburn, 689 (1997–2002, 2003–2016)
- Most goals: Jackie Swindells, 252 (1965–1971)

== See also ==
- Altrincham F.C. players
- Altrincham F.C. managers
