= Henny van Schoonhoven =

Dutch footballer

Personal information
- Date of birth: 28 August 1970
- Place of birth: Utrecht, Netherlands
- Date of death: 11 September 2009 (aged 39)
- Place of death: Maarssen, Netherlands
- Position: Centre back

Senior career*
Years	Team	Apps	(Gls)
1998–2000	FC Utrecht	26	(1)
2000	→ ADO Den Haag (loan)	7	(0)
2000–2003	SC Cambuur	42	(0)
Total		75	(1)
- * Club domestic league appearances and goals

Henny van Schoonhoven (28 August 1970 – 11 September 2009) was a Dutch professional footballer.

Born in Utrecht, van Schoonhoven played for FC Utrecht, ADO Den Haag and SC Cambuur, making a total of 75 league appearances.

Van Schoonhoven died of cancer on 11 September 2009.
