= Brian Tyrrell =

Irish footballer

Brian Tyrrell (died 19 April 2009) was an Irish football player who played as a forward.

== Career ==
Tyrrell was born in Dublin and signed for Shamrock Rovers in 1961. In September 1963 he emigrated to New York City along with Tony O'Connell. He made two appearances in the Inter-Cities Fairs Cup against previous winners Real Zaragoza in 1965. Within days of winning the 1966 FAI Cup he signed for Australian side Sydney United. Tyrrell returned home to sign for Drogheda United in October 1967. He died on 19 April 2009.

== Honours ==
Shamrock Rovers

- FAI Cup: 1966
- League of Ireland Shield: 1965–66
- Top Four Cup: 1965–66

== Sources ==
- The Hoops by Paul Doolan and Robert Goggins (ISBN 0-7171-2121-6)
