= Jimmy Hernon =

Scottish footballer (1924-2009)

Personal information
- Full name: James Hernon
- Date of birth: 6 December 1924
- Place of birth: Cleland, Scotland
- Date of death: 7 March 2009 (aged 84)
- Place of death: Hastings, England
- Position: Winger

Senior career*
Years	Team	Apps	(Gls)
1942–1948	Leicester City	31	(7)
1948–1951	Bolton Wanderers	43	(2)
1951–1954	Grimsby Town	91	(23)
1954–1955	Watford	43	(10)
1955–1957	Hastings United		
Total		208	(42)
- * Club domestic league appearances and goals

James Hernon (6 December 1924 – 7 March 2009) was a Scottish footballer who played as a winger for four teams in the English Football League in the immediate post-Second World War years.

Born in Cleland, Hernon was spotted by a Leicester City scout in 1942, and signed for the Foxes shortly afterwards. He made his debut in a wartime match against Crystal Palace. In 1943, he was called into service and served in the Royal Artillery and saw action in France, Belgium and Germany.

At the end of the war, Hernon resumed his football career at Leicester, and in 1948, he was sold to Bolton Wanderers for a £16,000 transfer fee – which was Britain's second-highest transfer fee at the time. Hernon spent three years at Burnden Park, before being signed by Grimsby Town manager Bill Shankly in 1951 for a £2,500 transfer fee.

In 1954, after three years at Grimsby, Hernon moved to Watford, where he spent two seasons before a knee injury forced him to retire from the professional game. He later resumed his career at non-league Hastings United and Canterbury City before injuries forced him to quit the game for good in 1959.

After retiring from football, Hernon settled in Hastings, and went on to become a salesman, chauffeur and school caretaker. He died on 7 March 2009, aged 84.
