= Don Leeson =

English footballer

Personal information
- Full name: Donald Leeson
- Date of birth: 25 August 1935
- Place of birth: Askern, England
- Date of death: 15 February 2009 (aged 73)
- Place of death: Grimsby, England
- Position: Goalkeeper

Senior career*
Years	Team	Apps	(Gls)
1954–1961	Barnsley	97	(0)
- * Club domestic league appearances and goals

Donald Leeson (25 August 1935 – 15 February 2009) was an English football goalkeeper who spent his entire professional career at Barnsley, where he played just over 100 first-team games.

Leeson, a native of Askern, then part of the West Riding of Yorkshire, signed a professional contract with Barnsley in 1954, and made his first-team debut for the Tykes during the 1956–57 season. He left Oakwell in 1961 to become a police officer in Grimsby. He continued to play football for several local non-league teams, and also represented the national police football team.

He retired from the police force in 1984, and died of lung cancer on 15 February 2009 following a long illness.
