= Jokke Kangaskorpi =

Finnish footballer (1972-2009)

Personal information
- Date of birth: 2 March 1972
- Place of birth: Mikkeli, Finland
- Date of death: 1 May 2009 (aged 37)
- Height: 1.81 m (5 ft 11 in)
- Position: Winger

Senior career*
| Years | Team | Apps | (Gls) |
| 1987–1994 | Mikkelin Palloilijat | 177 | (22) |
| 1995–1996 | Haka | 45 | (8) |
| 1997 | Lira Luleå BK | 21 | (9) |
| 1998 | FC Mikkeli | | |
| 1998 | Gefle IF | 20 | (1) |
| 1999 | IFK Gävle | | |
| 1999 | Tampereen Pallo-Veikot | 2 | (0) |
| 1999 | FC Mikkeli | 14 | (6) |
| 2000 | Kotkan Työväen Palloilijat | 30 | (4) |
| 2001–2006 | MP Mikkeli | 111 | (13) |

International career
| 1994–1996 | Finland | 11 | (0) |
- * Club domestic league appearances and goals

Jokke Kangaskorpi (2 March 1972 – 1 May 2009) was a Finnish professional footballer who played as a winger.

He played for the Finnish clubs MP Mikkeli, FC Haka, TPV and KTP making 244 Veikkausliiga appearances. With FC Haka he became Finnish league champion in 1995. He also played for Gefle IF, Lira Luleå BK, and IFK Gävle in Sweden, and was capped 11 times for Finland.
