= Jackie Swindells =

English footballer

Personal information
- Full name: Jack Swindells
- Date of birth: 12 April 1937
- Place of birth: Manchester, England
- Date of death: 23 June 2009 (aged 72)
- Place of death: St Kew, England
- Position: Inside forward

Youth career
- 1954–1957: Manchester City

Senior career*
Years	Team	Apps	(Gls)
1957–1959	Blackburn Rovers	9	(1)
1959–1961	Accrington Stanley	65	(28)
1961–1962	Barnsley	14	(8)
1962–1963	Workington	61	(19)
1963–1964	Torquay United	18	(6)
1964–1965	Newport County	23	(3)
1965–1971	Altrincham	229	(195)
1971–1974	Radcliffe Borough	?	(?)
Total		419	(260)
- * Club domestic league appearances and goals

Jack "Jackie" Swindells (12 April 1937 – 23 June 2009) was an English professional footballer who played as an inside forward.

== Career ==
Born in Manchester, Swindells played as an amateur for Manchester City, before turning professional with Blackburn Rovers in 1957. He also played for Accrington Stanley, Barnsley, Workington, Torquay United and Newport County, scoring a total of 65 goals in 190 appearances in the Football League. He later played non-League football for Altrincham and Radcliffe Borough.

Swindells' achievement of 82 goals in a single season is a record for Altrincham.

== Death ==
Swindells died on 23 June 2009, at the age of 72, at his home in Cornwall following a short illness.
