= 1921–22 Aston Villa F.C. season =

English football club season

Aston Villa
1921–22 season
- Chairman: Frederick Rinder
- Manager: George Ramsay
- Stadium: Villa Park
- First Division: 5th
- FA Cup: Fourth round
Home colours

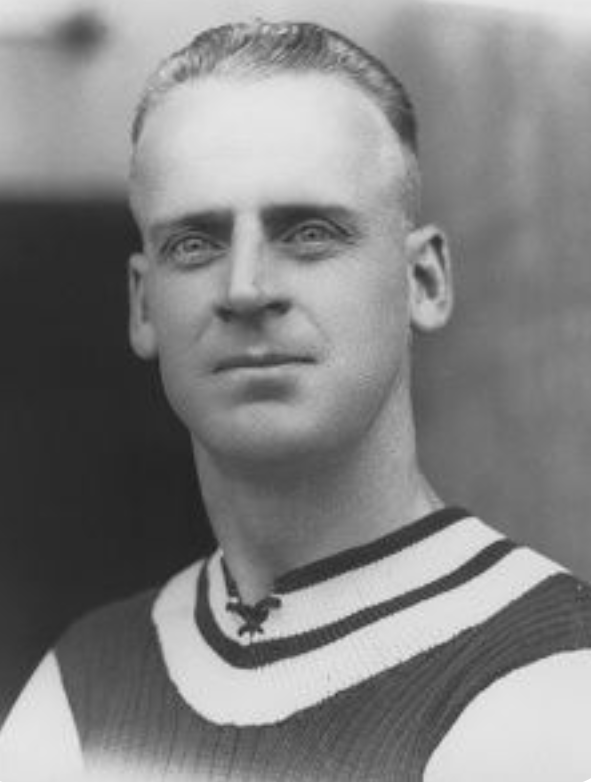
A one-club man, Billy Walker scored 244 goals in 531 appearances for Villa between 1920 and 1934. He is Aston Villa's all-time top goalscorer.

Second City Derby
- 11—5—5

The 1921-22 English football season was Aston Villa's 30th season in The Football League. Villa played the 1921–22 English football season in the Football League First Division. Villa finished fifth below Burnley, and Cardiff City, just above Bolton Wanderers and Newcastle United.

Billy Walker remains the only player to have scored a hat-trick of penalty kicks in a Football League game, doing so against Bradford City in November 1921. Richard York went on to make 47 appearances in the 1921–22 campaign, as the "Villans" finished fifth in the First Division. There were debuts for Tommy Mort (337), Len Capewell (157), Jock Johnstone (106), George Stephenson (93), Percy Jones (15), George Harkus (4) and Martin Taylor (1).

== Football League First Division. ==
Pos	Team	Pld	W	D	L	GF	GA	GAv	Pts
3	Burnley	42	22	5	15	72	54	1.333	49
4	Cardiff City	42	19	10	13	61	53	1.151	48
5	Aston Villa	42	22	3	17	74	55	1.345	47
6	Bolton Wanderers	42	20	7	15	68	59	1.153	47
7	Newcastle United	42	18	10	14	59	45	1.311	46

Source: World Football
Rules for classification: 1) Points; 2) Goal average; 3) Goals scored

=== Matches ===
27 August 1921	Manchester City	2–1	Aston Villa	Hyde Road
		Report	Billy Walker 35'

29 August 1921	Aston Villa	2–1	Cardiff City	Villa Park
	Billy Kirton; Andy Young	Report
Note: In the second match of the season, Cardiff defender Bert Smith became his club's first-ever player to score in the top division with a consolation goal during a 2–1 defeat to Aston Villa.

3 September 1921	Aston Villa	4–0	Manchester City	Villa Park
	Andy Young (2); Billy Kirton; Frank Moss	Report

5 September 1921	Cardiff City	0–4	Aston Villa	Ninian Park
		Report	Frank Barson (pen); Frank Moss; Ian Dickson

10 September 1921	Preston North End	1–0	Aston Villa	Deepdale
		Report

12 September 1921	Aston Villa	1–1	Blackburn Rovers	Villa Park
	Billy Walker (pen)	Report

17 September 1921	Aston Villa	2–0	Preston North End	Villa Park
	Billy Walker (2)	Report

24 September 1921	Tottenham Hotspur	3–1	Aston Villa	White Hart Lane
		Report	Ian Dickson

1 October 1921	Aston Villa	2–1	Tottenham Hotspur	Villa Park
	Billy Kirton; Ian Dickson	Report

8 October 1921	West Bromwich Albion	0–1	Aston Villa	The Hawthorns
		Report	Andy Young

15 October 1921	Aston Villa	0–1	West Bromwich Albion	Villa Park
		Report

22 October 1921	Middlesbrough	5–0	Aston Villa	Ayresome Park
		Report

29 October 1921	Aston Villa	6–2	Middlesbrough	Villa Park
	Arthur Dorrell; Ian Dickson (2); Billy Walker; Billy Kirton; Dicky York	Report

5 November 1921	Bradford City	3–2	Aston Villa	Valley Parade
		Report	Billy Walker (2)

12 November 1921	Aston Villa	7–1	Bradford City	Villa Park
	Billy Walker (3); Arthur Dorrell (2); Ian Dickson (2)	Report

19 November 1921	Aston Villa	3–1	Manchester United	Villa Park
	Billy Walker; Frank Barson; Ian Dickson	Report

26 November 1921	Manchester United	1–0	Aston Villa	Old Trafford
		Report

3 December 1921	Aston Villa	1–1	Liverpool	Villa Park
	Ian Dickson	Report

10 December 1921	Liverpool	2–0	Aston Villa	Anfield
		Report

17 December 1921	Newcastle United	1–2	Aston Villa	St James' Park
		Report	Billy Walker; Ian Dickson

24 December 1921	Aston Villa	1–0	Newcastle United	Villa Park
	Arthur Dorrell	Report

26 December 1921	Sheffield United	2–3	Aston Villa	Bramall Lane
		Report	Ian Dickson; Dicky York; Frank Barson

27 December 1921	Aston Villa	5–3	Sheffield United	Villa Park
	Ian Dickson (3); Billy Kirton; Billy Walker	Report

31 December 1921	Burnley	2–1	Aston Villa	Turf Moor
		Report	Frank Moss

14 January 1922	Aston Villa	2–0	Burnley	Villa Park
	Billy Kirton; Billy Walker	Report

21 January 1922	Everton	3–2	Aston Villa	Goodison Park
		Report	Billy Kirton (2)

4 February 1922	Sunderland	1–4	Aston Villa	Roker Park
		Report	Ian Dickson (2); Billy Walker; Billy Kirton

8 February 1922	Aston Villa	2–1	Everton	Villa Park
	Billy Kirton; Ian Dickson	Report

11 February 1922	Sunderland	0–2	Aston Villa	Roker Park
		Report	Billy Walker; Ian Dickson

25 February 1922	Aston Villa	2–0	Huddersfield Town	Villa Park
	Billy Kirton; Billy Walker	Report

11 March 1922	Aston Villa	1–1	Birmingham City	Villa Park
	Ian Dickson	Report
Note: In the first Second City derby in fifteen years, Villa were held to a draw at home and lost the away fixture.

15 March 1922	Birmingham City	1–0	Aston Villa	St Andrew's
		Report

18 March 1922	Aston Villa	2–0	Arsenal	Villa Park
	Ian Dickson; Billy Walker (pen)

25 March 1922	Arsenal	2–0	Aston Villa	Highbury

1 April 1922	Blackburn Rovers	1–2	Aston Villa	Ewood Park
		Report	Len Capewell; Arthur Dorrell

5 April 1922	Huddersfield Town	1–0	Aston Villa	Leeds Road

14 April 1922	Chelsea	1–0	Aston Villa	Stamford Bridge

15 April 1922	Aston Villa	2–1	Bolton Wanderers	Villa Park
	Billy Walker (2)

17 April 1922	Aston Villa	1–4	Chelsea	Villa Park
	Billy Walker

22 April 1922	Bolton Wanderers	1–0	Aston Villa	Burnden Park

29 April 1922	Aston Villa	2–0	Oldham Athletic	Villa Park
	Billy Walker; Len Capewell

6 May 1922	Oldham Athletic	3–1	Aston Villa	Boundary Park
			Len Capewell

== FA Cup ==
=== First round ===
Tie no	Home team	Score	Away team	Date
10	Aston Villa	6–1	Derby County	7 January 1922

=== Second round ===
The 16 Second Round matches were played on Saturday, 28 January 1922. Five matches were drawn, with replays taking place in the following midweek fixture. One of these, the Bradford City–Notts County match, went to a second replay.

Tie no	Home team	Score	Away team	Date
6	Aston Villa	1–0	Luton Town	28 January 1922

=== Third round ===
The eight Third Round matches were scheduled for Saturday, 18 February 1922. Four matches were drawn and went to replays in the following midweek fixture.

Tie no	Home team	Score	Away team	Date
1	Stoke	0–0	Aston Villa	18 February 1922
Replay	Aston Villa	4–0	Stoke	22 February 1922

=== Fourth round ===
The four Fourth round matches were scheduled for Saturday, 4 March 1922. There were three replays, each played in the following midweek fixture.

Tie no	Home team	Score	Away team	Date
1	Notts County	2–2	Aston Villa	4 March 1922
Replay	Aston Villa	3–4	Notts County	8 March 1922
