= 1919–20 Aston Villa F.C. season =

English football club season

Aston Villa
1919–20 season
- Chairman: Frederick Rinder
- Manager: George Ramsay
- First division: 9th
- FA Cup: Winners

The 1919-20 English football season was Aston Villa's 28th season in The Football League and the first following the end of World War I. George Ramsay was rebuilding Villa after the First World War. Villa won FA Cup beating Huddersfield Town 1–0 at Stamford Bridge It was Villa's sixth FA Cup win surpassing the previous record, Blackburn and Wanderers' total of five.

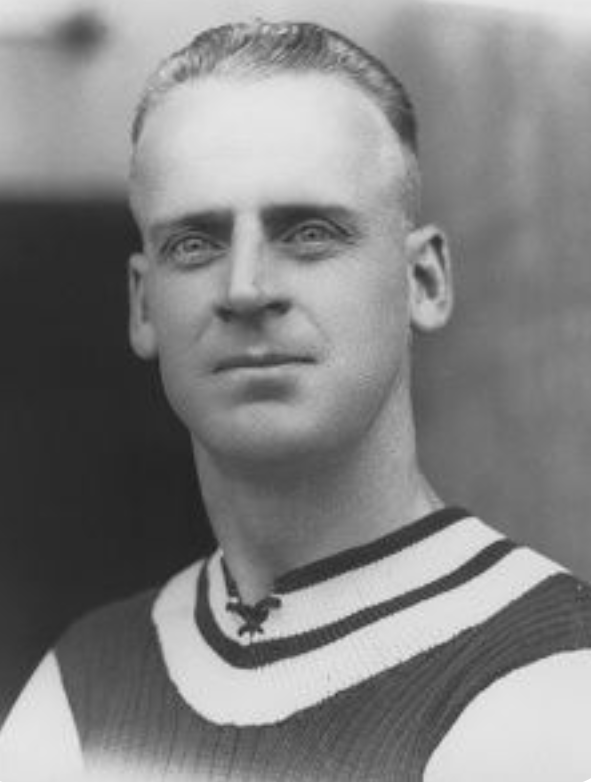
A one-club man, Billy Walker scored 244 goals in 531 appearances for Villa between 1920 and 1934. He is Aston Villa's all-time top goalscorer.

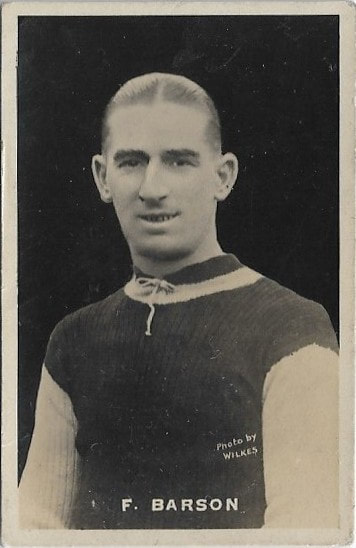
Frank Barson

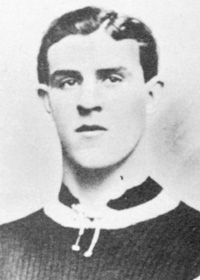
Tommy Ball

== Players ==
In October 1919, after a very public fall out with the Barnsley directors over travelling expenses, George Ramsay persuaded Frank Barson (92) to join Villa for a fee of £2,850 – "more than the average Sheffield worker earned in a year".

Billy Walker (478) made his senior debut in January 1920 in the FA Cup, scoring twice as Villa won 2–1 in the first round against non-league side Queens Park Rangers. He played in five more FA Cup games, scoring another three, helping Aston Villa reach the FA Cup Final. An extra time winner at Stamford Bridge by Billy Kirton saw Walker become an FA Cup winner in his debut season. Walker also scored 8 league goals in 15 matches at the back end of the 1919-20 season, including a hat-trick against Newcastle United, as Villa ended the first season after the first world war in ninth place.

Tommy Smart (405) played for Halesowen Town before signing for Aston Villa in January 1920 for a £300.00 fee. Richard York (356) scored one goal in 17 games in 1919–20, but did not feature in the 1920 FA Cup Final, which ended in a 1–0 victory over Huddersfield Town at Stamford Bridge. Arthur Dorrell (355) played for Carey Hall and R.A.S.C., before joining Aston Villa in May 1919. Billy Kirton (261) was born in Newcastle upon Tyne. Kirton was a member of the Temperance Society and played for Pandon Temperance before joining Leeds City in May 1919. After Kirton had played only one game for the club, City went out of business and he was transferred to Aston Villa for £500 in October 1919. He played 261 matches for Aston Villa.

Other debuts included:

- Ernie Blackburn (32)
- Jack Thompson (26)
- Andy Young (26)
- Walter Boyman (24)
- Jim Lee (18)
- Jack Hampson (14)
- Jimmy Lawrence (13)
- Hubert Bourne (7)
- Jack Pendleton (6)
- Arthur Davis (5)
- Joe Worrell (4)
- George Hadley (4)
- Dick Sloley (2)
- Walter Maiden (1)

Tommy Ball (74) (shot dead on 11 November 1923) joined from Newcastle in January 1920. Ball was seen as cover for Frank Barson. and first-team appearances were limited until Barson left in August 1922. Ball then became the first-choice centre-half, making 36 appearances in the 1922–23 season. In the following season, he continued to perform well at the heart of Villa's defence and he was forecast to be called up to play for England.

== League ==
Pos	Team	Pld	W	D	L	GF	GA	GAv	Pts
7	Manchester City	42	18	9	15	71	62	1.145	45
8	Newcastle United	42	17	9	16	44	39	1.128	43
9	Aston Villa	42	18	6	18	75	73	1.027	42
10	Arsenal	42	15	12	15	56	58	0.966	42
11	Bradford (Park Avenue)	42	15	12	15	60	63	0.952	42

Source: World Football
Rules for classification: 1) Points; 2) Goal average; 3) Goals scored

=== Matches ===
Date	Opponent	Venue	Result	Notes	Scorers
30 Aug 1919	Sunderland	Roker	1–2	—	Clem Stephenson (55')
1 Sep 1919	Derby	Villa Park	2–2	—	Hubert Bourne (51'); Clem Stephenson (53')
6 Sep 1919	Sunderland	Villa Park	0–3	—	—
8 Sep 1919	Derby	Baseball Ground	0–1	—	—
13 Sep 1919	Liverpool	Anfield	1–2	—	Hubert Bourne (35')
20 Sep 1919	Liverpool	Villa Park	0–1	—	—
27 Sep 1919	BPA	Park Avenue	1–6	—	Clem Stephenson (70' pen)
4 Oct 1919	BPA	Villa Park	1–0	—	Clem Stephenson (67')
11 Oct 1919	Preston	Deepdale	0–3	—	—
18 Oct 1919	Preston	Villa Park	2–4	—	Clem Stephenson (23'); Arthur Dorrell (67')
25 Oct 1919	Boro	Ayresome	4–1	—	Walter Boyman (49', 75', 81'); Arthur Dorrell (82')
1 Nov 1919	Boro	Villa Park	5–3	—	Clem Stephenson (8', 31', 76'); Arthur Dorrell (48'); Walter Boyman (70')
10 Nov 1919	Albion	Hawthorns	2–1	—	Clem Stephenson (1–0); Walter Boyman (2–1)
15 Nov 1919	Albion	Villa Park	2–4	—	Walter Boyman (22'); Billy Kirton (80')
22 Nov 1919	Sheffield United	Bramall Lane	2–1	—	Billy Kirton (25', 33')
29 Nov 1919	Sheffield United	Villa Park	4–0	—	Clem Stephenson (6', 55', 62'); 4–0
6 Dec 1919	United	Villa Park	2–0	—	Billy Kirton (23'); Walter Boyman (76')
13 Dec 1919	United	Old Trafford	2–1	—	Clem Stephenson (17', 81')
20 Dec 1919	Oldham	Villa Park	3–0	—	Billy Kirton (15'); Harold Edgley (49'); Clem Stephenson (52')
25 Dec 1919	Chelsea	Villa Park	5–2	—	Frank Barson (13'); Billy Kirton (2–1); Clem Stephenson (3–2, 4–2); Andy Ducat (5–2)
27 Dec 1919	Oldham	Boundary Park	3–0	—	Andy Young (17', 85'); Billy Kirton (35')
1 Jan 1920	Newcastle	St James'	0–2	—	—
3 Jan 1920	Burnley	Villa Park	2–2	—	Clem Stephenson (1–0, 2–1)
17 Jan 1920	Burnley	Turf Moor	0–0	—	—
24 Jan 1920	Arsenal	Highbury	1–0	—	Clem Stephenson (19')
7 Feb 1920	Everton	Goodison	1–1	—	Billy Walker (15')
11 Feb 1920	Arsenal	Villa Park	2–1	—	Clem Stephenson (50', 80')
14 Feb 1920	Everton	Villa Park	2–2	—	Billy Walker (14'); Billy Kirton (82')
28 Feb 1920	Bradford	Villa Park	3–1	—	Billy Walker (46'); Clem Stephenson (60'); Own Goal (78')
13 Mar 1920	Bolton	Burnden	1–2	—	Billy Kirton (50')
17 Mar 1920	Bradford	Valley Parade	1–3	—	Frank Barson (53' pen)
20 Mar 1920	Blackburn	Villa Park	1–2	—	Billy Walker (5')
2 Apr 1920	Chelsea	Stamford Bridge	1–2	—	Billy Kirton (1–0)
3 Apr 1920	Notts County	Villa Park	3–1	—	Walter Boyman (5'); Billy Kirton (14'); Frank Barson (75' pen)
5 Apr 1920	Newcastle	Villa Park	4–0	—	Charlie Wallace (17'); Billy Walker (21', 22', 81')
7 Apr 1920	Bolton	Villa Park	3–6	—	Clem Stephenson (1–1); Billy Walker (30'); Frank Barson (3–6 pen)
10 Apr 1920	Notts County	Meadow Lane	1–2	—	Arthur Davis (76')
15 Apr 1920	Blackburn	Ewood	1–5	—	Dicky York (1–4)
17 Apr 1920	Wednesday	Villa Park	3–1	—	Billy Kirton (35'); Clem Stephenson (58'); Arthur Dorrell (83')
26 Apr 1920	Manchester City	Villa Park	0–1	—	—
29 Apr 1920	Wednesday	Hillsborough	1–0	—	Clem Stephenson (1–0)
1 May 1920	Manchester City	Hyde Road	2–2	—	Billy Kirton (19', 51')

== FA Cup ==
1920 FA Cup Final
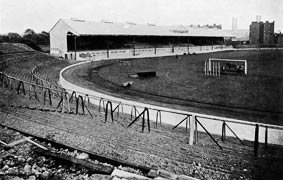
- Stanford Bridge hosted the match
- Event: 1919–20 FA Cup
Aston Villa	Huddersfield Town
1	0
- After extra time
- Date: 24 April 1920
- Venue: Stamford Bridge, London
- Referee: J.T. Howcroft (Bolton)
- Attendance: 50,018

The 1920 FA Cup final, the first since the end of the First World War, was contested by Aston Villa and Huddersfield at Stamford Bridge. Aston Villa won 1–0, with the goal coming in extra time from Billy Kirton, to clinch the trophy for a record sixth time. This was the first ever FA Cup Final to require extra time to be played. Huddersfield had secured promotion from the Second Division this season and were appearing in their first final.

Aston Villa captain, Andy Ducat, had represented England at both football and cricket. The Villa team had four surviving members of the club's last victory in the 1913 F.A. Cup final; Tommy Weston, Sam Hardy, Clem Stephenson and Charlie Wallace. Those four Villa players and Frank Moss had all served in the Armed Forces during World War I. Frank Barson, known for his tough style of play, was warned before the kick-off by the referee against using his normal tactics.

The trophy was presented by Prince Henry, the fourth son of King George V. This was Villa manager George Ramsay's sixth FA Cup Final win, a record for a manager, and one that was only equalled in 2015 by Arsène Wenger – against Aston Villa.

=== Road to the Final ===
Round 1	Aston Villa	2–1	Queens Park Rangers	QPR were a non-league club at this time.
Round 2	Manchester United	1–2	Aston Villa	
Round 3	Aston Villa	1–0	Sunderland	
Quarter-final	Tottenham Hotspur	0–1	Aston Villa	Tottenham Hotspur were in the Second Division at this time.
Semi-final	Aston Villa	3–1	Chelsea	played at Bramall Lane, Sheffield

=== Match details ===
24 April 1920
15:00 BST

Aston Villa	1–0 (a.e.t.)	Huddersfield Town
Kirton 100'	Report

Stamford Bridge, London
Attendance: 50,018
Referee: J.T. Howcroft (Bolton)

Aston Villa	Huddersfield Town

GK	(England) Sam Hardy
RB	(England) Tommy Smart
LB	(England) Tommy Weston
RH	(England) Andy Ducat (c)
CH	(England) Frank Barson
LH	(England) Frank Moss
OR	(England) Charlie Wallace
IR	(England) Billy Kirton
CF	(England) Billy Walker
IL	(England) Clem Stephenson
OL	(England) Arthur Dorrell
Secretary-Manager:
(Scotland) George Ramsay

GK	(Scotland) Sandy Mutch
RB	(England) James Wood
LB	(England) Fred Bullock (c)
RH	(England) Charlie Slade
CH	(England) Tom Wilson
LH	(England) Billy Watson
OR	(England) George Richardson
IR	(England) Frank Mann
CF	(England) Sam Taylor
IL	(England) Jack Swann
OL	(England) Ernie Islip
Manager:
(England) Ambrose Langley
