= Arthur Dorrell =

English footballer (1896–1942)

Personal information
- Full name: Arthur Reginald Dorrell
- Date of birth: 30 March 1896
- Place of birth: Small Heath, Birmingham, Warwickshire, England
- Date of death: 13 September 1942 (aged 46)
- Place of death: Alum Rock, Birmingham, England
- Height: 5 ft 6 1/2 in (1.69 m)
- Position: Left winger

Youth career
- Carey Hall
- R.A.S.C.

Senior career*
Years	Team	Apps	(Gls)
1919–1931	Aston Villa	355	(60)
1931–1932	Port Vale	34	(4)
Total		389	(64)

International career
1924–1925	England	4	(1)
	The Football League	2	(0)
- * Club domestic league appearances and goals

Arthur Reginald Dorrell (30 March 1896 – 13 September 1942) was an English international footballer who played on the left-wing. He was the son of former Villa player William Dorrell. He played for Aston Villa between 1919 and 1931, scoring 65 goals in 390 appearances and winning four England caps. He played in both the 1920 and 1924 FA Cup finals, the first of which Villa won. He then retired after a season with Port Vale.

== Early and personal life ==
Arthur Reginald Dorrell was born on 30 March 1896 in Small Heath, Birmingham, Warwickshire. He was the third of four children to William and Clara; his father was a professional footballer, as well as a licensed victualler and turner. His father married a further two times, having a child with each woman. Dorrell enlisted as an engineers fitter in the Army on 24 October 1914, serving throughout World War I until being demobbed on 20 May 1919. Dorrell married Sarah Jane Clewlow in 1922, and the couple had a daughter, Marjorie. Dorrell died on 13 September 1942 at The Pelham Arms in Alum Rock, Birmingham, and his funeral was held three days later at Erdington Parish Church; the pallbearers were Frank Moss, Joe Bradford, Billy Kirton, Dicky York, George Blackburn and Eric Houghton.

== Club career ==
=== Aston Villa ===
Dorrell played for Carey Hall and R.A.S.C. before joining Aston Villa in May 1919. He made 19 appearances in the 1919–20 season, as Villa posted a ninth-place finish in the First Division. He also played in the 1920 FA Cup final, as Villa claimed the FA Cup for the sixth time with a 1–0 win over Huddersfield Town at Stamford Bridge. He featured 39 times in 1920–21, as Villa finished tenth in the league. He bagged six goals in 48 appearances in 1921–22, helping Villa to fifth in the league. Dorrell scored seven goals in 42 games in 1922–23, as Villa slipped a place to sixth. They finished sixth again in 1923–24, with Dorrell scoring five goals in 45 games. He also played in the 1924 FA Cup final at Wembley, which ended in a 2–0 defeat to Newcastle United.

The club slipped to 15th place in 1924–25 despite Dorrell scoring eight goals in 45 appearances. He hit five goals in 42 games in 1925–26, as Villa rose back to sixth. He travelled to Sweden with Villa on their first foreign tour in May. Örgryte celebrated a major success when beating Aston Villa 5–2. Villa were defeated by Gothenburg-combined (Kombinerol Gotesburgslag). Villa won 11 - 2 over the select Oslo-combined Lyn og Frig including FK Lyn & Frigg Oslo players. Len Capewell scored four, Billy Walker a hat-trick, and Dorrell a brace.

Villa finished tenth in 1926–27, with Dorrell scoring eight goals in 39 games. He then hit nine goals in 39 games in 1927–28, as the "Villans" rose two places to eighth. They then finished third in 1928–29, with Dorrell hitting nine goals in 29 appearances. However, he featured just three times in 1929–30, as Villa finished in fourth spot. He played no part at all in the 1930–31 campaign, as the club finished as runners-up to Arsenal. He made a total of 390 appearances in all competitions for the club, scoring 65 goals.

=== Port Vale ===
He signed with Port Vale in June 1931, along with long-time Villa teammate Richard York. He scored five goals in 34 Second Division games in the 1931–32 campaign, helping the "Valiants" to narrowly avoid relegation. Now aged 36, he decided to retire from football in May 1932. Upon his retirement as a player, he returned to Aston Villa as a coach.

== International career ==
Dorrell made his England debut on 8 December 1924, in a 4–0 win over Belgium at The Hawthorns. His second cap came against Wales on 28 February 1925, in a 2–1 win at Vetch Field, as part of the 1925 British Home Championship. On 21 May 1925, he scored in a 3–2 win over France in a friendly at the Stade Olympique Yves-du-Manoir. His fourth and final cap came on 24 October 1925, in a goalless draw with Ireland at Windsor Park in the 1926 British Home Championship.

== Career statistics ==
=== Club statistics ===
Appearances and goals by club, season and competition
Club	Season	League			FA Cup		Total	
Club	Season	Division	Apps	Goals	Apps	Goals	Apps	Goals
Aston Villa	1919–20	First Division	18	4	1	0	19	4
Aston Villa	1920–21	First Division	34	4	5	0	39	4
Aston Villa	1922–23	First Division	42	6	6	0	48	6
Aston Villa	1922–23	First Division	41	7	1	0	42	7
Aston Villa	1923–24	First Division	39	4	6	1	45	5
Aston Villa	1924–25	First Division	41	8	4	0	45	8
Aston Villa	1925–26	First Division	38	5	4	0	42	5
Aston Villa	1926–27	First Division	38	7	1	1	39	8
Aston Villa	1927–28	First Division	36	9	3	0	39	9
Aston Villa	1928–29	First Division	25	6	4	3	29	9
Aston Villa	1929–30	First Division	3	0	0	0	3	0
Aston Villa	1930–31	First Division	0	0	0	0	0	0
Aston Villa	Total		355	60	35	5	390	65
Port Vale	1931–32	Second Division	34	4	2	0	36	4
Career total			389	64	37	5	426	69

=== International statistics ===
England national team
Year	Apps	Goals
1924	1	0
1925	3	1
Total	4	1

== Honours ==
Aston Villa

- FA Cup: 1919–20; runner-up: 1923–24
