= 1923–24 Aston Villa F.C. season =

English football club season

Aston Villa
1923–24 season
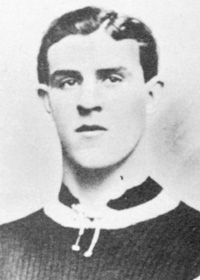
- Tommy Ball
- President: Patrick Hannon
- Chairman: Frederick Rinder
- Manager: George Ramsay
- Stadium: Villa Park
- First Division: 6th
- FA Cup: Finalists

Second City Derby
- 12--7--6

The 1923–24 English football season was Aston Villa's 32nd season in The Football League.

In November 1923, Aston Villa centre-half Tommy Ball was shot dead by his neighbour, thus becoming the only Football League player to have been murdered, although in November 2019, one police officer was charged with murder in connection with Dalian Atkinson's death.

There were debuts for Alec Talbot (264), Teddy Bowen (203), Vic Milne (156), Billy Armfield (12), Albert Surtees (11), Percy Varco (10), Alex McClure (7), Joe Corbett (8), Archie Campbell (4), Bert Singleton (2), and Norman Mackay (2). Dicky York scored five goals in 43 games in 1923–24. He also appeared at Wembley in the 1924 FA Cup Final.

== Football League First Division ==
| Pos | Team | Pld | W | D | L | GF | GA | GAv | Pts |
|---|---|---|---|---|---|---|---|---|---|
| 4 | Bolton Wanderers | 42 | 18 | 14 | 10 | 68 | 34 | 2.000 | 50 |
| 5 | Sheffield United | 42 | 19 | 12 | 11 | 69 | 49 | 1.408 | 50 |
| 6 | Aston Villa | 42 | 18 | 13 | 11 | 52 | 37 | 1.405 | 49 |
| 7 | Everton | 42 | 18 | 13 | 11 | 62 | 53 | 1.170 | 49 |
| 8 | Blackburn Rovers | 42 | 17 | 11 | 14 | 54 | 50 | 1.080 | 45 |

Rules for classification: 1) Points; 2) Goal average; 3) Goals scored

=== Matches ===
| 25 August 1923 | Birmingham City | 3–0 | Aston Villa | St Andrew’s |
| | | Report |
Note: Aston Villa's visit to Small Heath on 25 August 1923 produced the Highest home attendance that season for the local rivals in the Second City derby. Villa lost the away fixture 3-0.

| 29 August 1923 | Aston Villa | 2–0 | Manchester City | Villa Park |
| | Billy Walker Dicky York | Report |

| 1 September 1923 | Aston Villa | 0–0 | Birmingham City | Villa Park |
| | | Report |
Note: A 59,147 crowd watched a goalless draw at Villa Park in the home leg of the Second City derby.

| 5 September 1923 | Aston Villa | 2–1 | Manchester City | Villa Park |
| | (Len Capewell) (Billy Kirton) | Report |

| 8 September 1923 | Chelsea | 0–0 | Aston Villa | Stamford Bridge |
| | | Report |

| 12 September 1923 | Aston Villa | 1–1 | Everton | Villa Park |
| | (Own goal) | Report |

| 15 September 1923 | Aston Villa | 0–0 | Chelsea | Villa Park |
| | | Report |

| 19 September 1923 | Everton | 2–0 | Aston Villa | Goodison Park |
| | | Report |

| 22 September 1923 | Preston North End | 2–2 | Aston Villa | Deepdale |
| | | Report | (Billy Walker) (Len Capewell) |

| 29 September 1923 | Aston Villa | 5–1 | Preston North End | Villa Park |
| | Billy Walker (3), Billy Kirton, Len Capewell | Report |

| 6 October 1923 | Burnley | 1–2 | Aston Villa | Turf Moor |
| | | Report | (Len Capewell) (Billy Walker) |

| 13 October 1923 | Aston Villa | 1–1 | Burnley | Villa Park |
| | (Billy Kirton) | Report |

| 20 October 1923 | West Bromwich Albion | 1–0 | Aston Villa | The Hawthorns |
| | | Report |

| 27 October 1923 | Aston Villa | 4–0 | West Bromwich Albion | Villa Park |
| | (Dicky York), Billy Walker (3) | Report |

| 3 November 1923 | Aston Villa | 0–0 | Notts County | Villa Park |
| | | Report |

| 10 November 1923 | Notts County | 0–1 | Aston Villa | Meadow Lane |
| | | Report | (Billy Kirton) |
Note: "Moss, Ball and Blackburn were difficult to beat". Two days later Thomas Ball was shot dead.

| 17 November 1923 | Aston Villa | 0–0 | Liverpool | Villa Park |
| | | Report |

| 24 November 1923 | Liverpool | 0–1 | Aston Villa | Anfield |
| | | Report | (Len Capewell) |

| 1 December 1923 | Aston Villa | 0–0 | Middlesbrough | Villa Park |
| | | Report |

| 8 December 1923 | Middlesbrough | 0–2 | Aston Villa | Middlesbrough |
| | | Report | (Ian Dickson) (Billy Kirton) |

| 15 December 1923 | Sheffield United | 2–1 | Aston Villa | Bramall Lane |
| | | Report | (Len Capewell) |

| 22 December 1923 | Sheffield United | 2–2 | Aston Villa | Bramall Lane |
| | | Report | (Len Capewell) (Len Capewell) |

| 25 December 1923 | Aston Villa | 1–1 | West Ham United | Villa Park |
| | (Len Capewell) | Report |

| 26 December 1923 | West Ham United | 1–0 | Aston Villa | Upton Park |
| | | Report |

| 29 December 1923 | Aston Villa | 2–1 | Cardiff City | Villa Park |
| | (Len Capewell) (Own goal) | Report |
Note: By December, consecutive victories over Nottingham Forest enhanced Cardiff's lead in the table. However, the form of rivals Aston Villa, Huddersfield Town and Everton meant that Cardiff were unable to extend their lead by more than two points.

| 1 January 1924 | Newcastle United | 4–1 | Aston Villa | St James’ Park |
| | | Report | (Billy Walker) |

| 5 January 1924 | Cardiff City | 0–2 | Aston Villa | Ninian Park |
| | | Report | (Billy Walker) (Len Capewell) |

| 19 January 1924 | Bolton Wanderers | 1–0 | Aston Villa | Burnden Park |
| | | Report |

| 26 January 1924 | Aston Villa | 1–0 | Bolton Wanderers | Villa Park |
| | (Len Capewell) | Report |

| 9 February 1924 | Aston Villa | 0–1 | Sunderland | Villa Park |
| | | Report |

| 13 February 1924 | Sunderland | 2–0 | Aston Villa | Roker Park |
| | | Report |

| 16 February 1924 | Arsenal | 0–1 | Aston Villa | Highbury |
| | | Report | (Arthur Dorrell) |

| 1 March 1924 | Blackburn Rovers | 3–1 | Aston Villa | Ewood Park |
| | | Report | (Len Capewell) |

| 12 March 1924 | Aston Villa | 2–1 | Arsenal | Villa Park |
| | (Billy Kirton) (Arthur Dorrell) | Report |

| 15 March 1924 | Aston Villa | 0–0 | Tottenham Hotspur | Villa Park |
| | | Report |

| 22 March 1924 | Tottenham Hotspur | 2–3 | Aston Villa | White Hart Lane |
| | | Report | Len Capewell (3) |

| 2 April 1924 | Aston Villa | 1–0 | Blackburn Rovers | Villa Park |
| | (George Stephenson) | Report |

| 5 April 1924 | Huddersfield Town | 1–0 | Aston Villa | Leeds Road |
| | | Report |

| 12 April 1924 | Nottingham Forest | 0–0 | Aston Villa | City Ground |
| | | Report |
Note: Joe Corbett made his debut

| 19 April 1924 | Aston Villa | 2–0 | Nottingham Forest | Villa Park |
| | (Len Capewell) (Len Capewell) | Report |

| 21 April 1924 | Aston Villa | 6–1 | Newcastle United | Villa Park |
| | Own goal,Len Capewell, Dicky York, Billy Walker (3) | Report |

| 30 April 1924 | Aston Villa | 3–1 | Huddersfield Town | Villa Park |
| | (Billy Walker) (Len Capewell) (Arthur Dorrell) | Report |
Note: Villa's 1–3 victory over Huddersfield Town A.F.C. was the biggest loss for the Yorkshire club that season.

Source: avfchistory.co.uk

== FA Cup ==
1924 FA Cup final
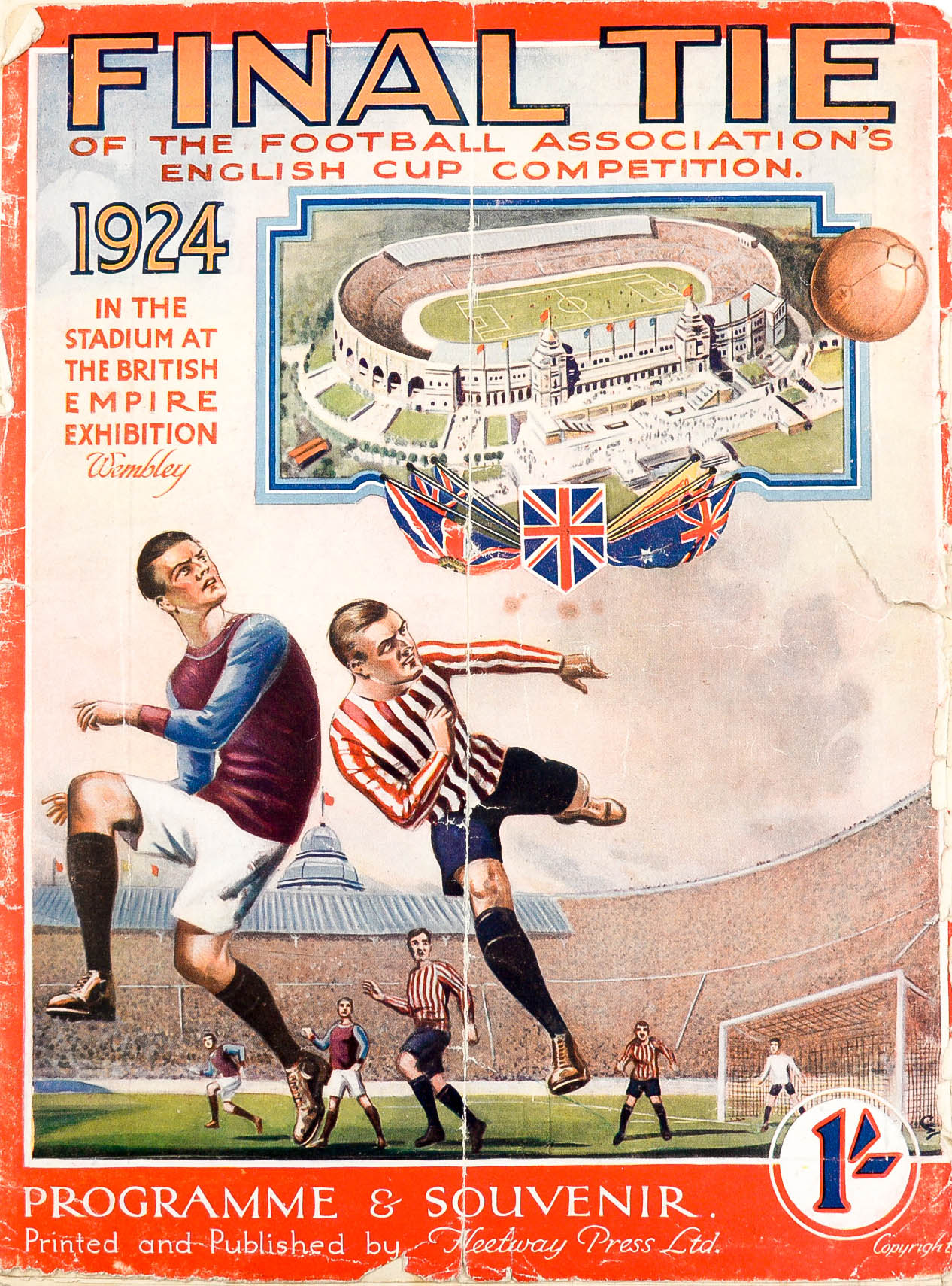
- Illustrated programme
- Event: 1923–24 FA Cup
| Newcastle United | Aston Villa |
| 2 | 0 |
- Date: 26 April 1924
- Venue: Wembley Stadium, London
- Referee: W. E. Russell
- Attendance: 91,695
- Weather: Rain

Villa contested the 1924 FA Cup final against Newcastle United at Wembley. Newcastle won 2–0, with the goals scored by Neil Harris and Stan Seymour. The referee was Swindon-born William E. Russell.

The match has become commonly known as the "Rainy Day Final" due to the weather that day, a consequence of which has led to there being very few good condition programmes left for the game (many fans used their match programmes as makeshift umbrellas). The value of the programme is the highest for any Wembley final with recent sales attaining over £6,000 at auction.

=== Road to the Final ===
| 12 January 1924 R1 | Ashington | 1–5 | Aston Villa |
| 2 February 1924 R2 | Swansea Town | 0–2 | Aston Villa |
| 23 February 1924 R3 | Aston Villa | 3–0 | Leeds United |
| Quarter-final | West Bromwich Albion | 0–2 | Aston Villa |
| Semi-final | Aston Villa | 3–0 | Burnley |
| | (at Bramall Lane) | | |

=== Match details ===
26 April 1924
15:00 BST

| Newcastle United | 2–0 | Aston Villa |
|---|---|---|
| Harris 83'; Seymour 85' | (Report) |

Wembley Stadium, London
Attendance: 91,695
Referee: W. E. Russell

Newcastle United
Aston Villa

| GK | (England) Bill Bradley |
| DF | (England) Billy Hampson |
| DF | (England) Frank Hudspeth (c) |
| MF | (England) Peter Mooney |
| MF | (England) Charlie Spencer |
| MF | (Scotland) Willie Gibson |
| FW | (Scotland) James Low |
| FW | (Scotland) Billy Cowan |
| FW | (Scotland) Neil Harris |
| FW | (Scotland) Tommy McDonald |
| FW | (England) Stan Seymour |
Manager:
Selection Committee

| GK | (England) Tommy Jackson |
| DF | (England) Tommy Smart |
| DF | (England) Tommy Mort |
| MF | (England) Frank Moss |
| MF | (Scotland) Vic Milne |
| MF | (England) George Blackburn |
| FW | (England) Dicky York |
| FW | (England) Billy Kirton |
| FW | (England) Len Capewell |
| FW | (England) Billy Walker (c) |
| FW | (England) Arthur Dorrell |
Secretary-Manager:
(Scotland) George Ramsay

== See also ==
- List of Aston Villa F.C. records and statistics
