= 1925–26 Aston Villa F.C. season =

English football club season

Aston Villa
1925–26 season
- President: Patrick Hannon
- Chairman: Frederick Rinder
- Manager: George Ramsay
- Stadium: Villa Park
- First Division: 6th
- FA Cup: Fifth round

Second City Derby
- 13--9--7

The 1925–26 English football season was Aston Villa's 34th season in The Football League and was George Ramsay's last season and he retired in April 1926 His trophy haul of six League Championships and six FA Cups established Aston Villa as the most successful club in England. He has been described as the world's first paid football manager. To this day, Ramsay remains one of the most successful managers in the history of English football.

In the opening match of the season Villa beat Burnley 10–0 with goals by Len Capewell (5), George Stephenson, Billy Walker (3) and Dicky York. Dicky York hit 20 goals in 44 appearances in 1925–26. In the Second City derby Villa could only manage a draw at home before losing to Birmingham away.

There were debuts for Reg Chester and Fred Norris. Chester would make 97 appearances in ten years at Villa. Norris made nine Football League appearances at Aston Villa, scoring twice.

The team sailed North to Sweden on their first foreign tour in May. Örgryte celebrated a major success when beating Villa 5–2, Billy Kirton scoring a consolation minutes from time. Villa lost to Gothenburg-combined (Kombinerol Gotesburgslag). After a golf & fishing break the tourers won 11 - 2 over the select Oslo-combined Lyn og Frig including FK Lyn & Frigg Oslo players. Len Capewell scored four, Billy Walker a hat-trick, Arthur Dorrell a brace, and Tommy Muldoon scored the goal of the game while George Stephenson scored the other.

== Table ==
Pos	Team	Pld	W	D	L	GF	GA	GAv	Pts
4	Bury	42	20	7	15	85	77	1.104	47
5	Sheffield United	42	19	8	15	102	82	1.244	46
6	Aston Villa	42	16	12	14	86	76	1.132	44
7	Liverpool	42	14	16	12	70	63	1.111	44
8	Bolton Wanderers	42	17	10	15	75	76	0.987	44

Source: World Football
Rules for classification: 1) Points; 2) Goal average; 3) Goals scored

=== Matches ===
29 August 1925	Aston Villa	10–0	Burnley	Villa Park
	Len Capewell (5); Billy Walker (3); Dicky York; George Stephenson	Report

2 September 1925	Manchester United	3–0	Aston Villa	Old Trafford
		Report

5 September 1925	Leeds United	2–2	Aston Villa	Elland Road
		Report	Arthur Dorrell; Billy Walker

7 September 1925	Aston Villa	2–2	Manchester United	Villa Park
	Len Capewell; Dicky York	Report

12 September 1925	Aston Villa	2–2	Newcastle United	Villa Park
	Len Capewell; Billy Walker (pen)	Report

19 September 1925	Bolton Wanderers	1–3	Aston Villa	Burnden Park
			Len Capewell; Dicky York (2)
Note: https://www.avfchistory.co.uk/game/1310

26 September 1925	Aston Villa	2–1	Notts County	Villa Park
	Len Capewell; Vic Milne	Report

3 October 1925	West Bromwich Albion	1–1	Aston Villa	The Hawthorns
		Report	Len Capewell

5 October 1925	Aston Villa	4–2	Sunderland	Villa Park
	Len Capewell (2); Billy Walker (2)	Report

10 October 1925	Leicester City	1–2	Aston Villa	Filbert Street
		Report	Len Capewell; Billy Walker

17 October 1925	Aston Villa	3–3	Birmingham City	Villa Park
	Billy Walker (2); Len Capewell	Report

24 October 1925	Bury	2–3	Aston Villa	Gigg Lane
		Report	Dicky York (3)

31 October 1925	Aston Villa	0–2	Cardiff City	Villa Park
		Report

7 November 1925	Sheffield United	4–1	Aston Villa	Bramall Lane
		Report	Len Capewell

14 November 1925	Aston Villa	3–0	Huddersfield Town	Villa Park
	Len Capewell (3)	Report

21 November 1925	Everton	1–1	Aston Villa	Goodison Park
		Report	Len Capewell

28 November 1925	Aston Villa	3–1	Manchester City	Villa Park
	Billy Walker; Len Capewell (2)	Report

5 December 1925	Tottenham Hotspur	2–2	Aston Villa	White Hart Lane
		Report	Dicky York (2)

12 December 1925	Aston Villa	1–2	Blackburn Rovers	Villa Park
	Billy Walker (pen)	Report

19 December 1925	Sunderland	3–2	Aston Villa	Roker Park
		Report	Billy Walker; Len Capewell

25 December 1925	West Ham United	5–2	Aston Villa	Upton Park
		Report	Billy Walker (pen); Dicky York

26 December 1925	Aston Villa	2–0	West Ham United	Villa Park
	Len Capewell; Arthur Dorrell	Report

1 January 1926	Liverpool	3–1	Aston Villa	Anfield
		Report	Len Capewell

2 January 1926	Burnley	2–3	Aston Villa	Turf Moor
		Report	Len Capewell; Dicky York (2)

23 January 1926	Newcastle United	2–2	Aston Villa	St James' Park
			Dicky York; Billy Walker

3 February 1926	Aston Villa	3–1	Leeds United	Villa Park
	Arthur Dorrell; Len Capewell (2)

6 February 1926	Notts County	1–0	Aston Villa	Meadow Lane

13 February 1926	Aston Villa	2–1	West Bromwich Albion	Villa Park
	Billy Walker; Len Capewell

27 February 1926	Birmingham City	2–1	Aston Villa	St Andrew's
			Billy Walker

6 March 1926	Aston Villa	1–1	Bury	Villa Park
	Tommy Mort

10 March 1926	Aston Villa	2–2	Leicester City	Villa Park
	Dicky York

13 March 1926	Cardiff City	2–0	Aston Villa	Ninian Park

20 March 1926	Aston Villa	2–2	Sheffield United	Villa Park
	Len Capewell; Arthur Dorrell

27 March 1926	Huddersfield Town	5–1	Aston Villa	Leeds Road
			Dicky York

2 April 1926	Aston Villa	3–0	Arsenal	Villa Park
	Dicky York; George Stephenson; Billy Walker

3 April 1926	Aston Villa	3–1	Everton	Villa Park
	Dicky York; Billy Walker (pen)

5 April 1926	Arsenal	2–0	Aston Villa	Highbury

6 April 1926	Aston Villa	3–0	Liverpool	Villa Park
	Fred Norris (2); Reg Chester

10 April 1926	Manchester City	4–2	Aston Villa	Maine Road
			Arthur Dorrell; Billy Walker

17 April 1926	Aston Villa	3–0	Tottenham Hotspur	Villa Park
	Len Capewell (2); George Stephenson

24 April 1926	Blackburn Rovers	3–1	Aston Villa	Ewood Park
			Billy Walker (pen)

26 April 1926	Aston Villa	2–2	Bolton Wanderers	Villa Park
	Len Capewell; Tommy Smart (pen)

Source: avfchistory.co.uk
