= Jimmy Stephenson =

English footballer

Personal information
- Full name: James Stephenson
- Date of birth: 10 February 1895
- Place of birth: New Delaval, England
- Date of death: 21 January 1958 (aged 62)
- Place of death: Newcastle Upon Tyne, England
- Height: 5 ft 6 in (1.68 m)
- Position: Outside right

Senior career*
Years	Team	Apps	(Gls)
–1913	New Delaval Villa		
1913–1921	Aston Villa	31	(2)
1916–1919	→ Leeds City (guest)	36	(4)
1921–1922	Sunderland	21	(2)
1922–1927	Watford	195	(18)
1927–1928	Queens Park Rangers	18	(0)
1928–1930	Boston Town		
1930	New Delaval Villa		
1930–1931	Ashington		
- New Delaval Villa
- * Club domestic league appearances and goals

James Stephenson (10 February 1895 – 1 February 1958) was an English professional footballer who made over 190 appearances in the Football League for Watford as an outside right. He also played League football for Aston Villa, Sunderland and Queens Park Rangers.

== Personal life ==
Stephenson's brothers were England international footballers Clem and George and he was the uncle of sportsman Bob Stephenson. In May 1917, nearly three years after the outbreak of the First World War, Stephenson enlisted in the Royal Field Artillery and saw action on the Western Front and later served as part of the British Army of the Rhine. For a period while a professional footballer, he ran the Nascot Arms pub in Watford.

== Career statistics ==
Appearances and goals by club, season and competition
Club	Season	League			FA Cup		Total	
Club	Season	Division	Apps	Goals	Apps	Goals	Apps	Goals
Aston Villa	1914–15	First Division	11	2	0	0	11	2
Aston Villa	1919–20	First Division	5	0	0	0	5	0
Aston Villa	1920–21	First Division	15	3	1	0	16	3
Aston Villa	Total		31	5	1	0	32	5
Sunderland	1921–22	First Division	22	2	1	0	23	2
Watford	1922–23	Third Division South	38	3	3	1	41	4
Watford	1923–24	Third Division South	40	3	4	1	44	4
Watford	1924–25	Third Division South	41	3	2	0	43	3
Watford	1925–26	Third Division South	40	6	3	0	43	6
Watford	1926–27	Third Division South	36	3	2	0	38	3
Watford	Total		195	18	14	2	209	20
Queens Park Rangers	1927–28	Third Division South	18	0	0	0	18	0
Career total			266	25	16	2	282	27
