= Tommy Ball =

English footballer (1900-1923)

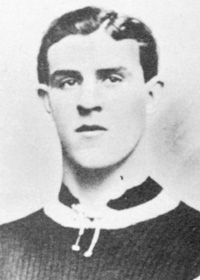

Personal information
- Full name: Thomas Edgar Ball
- Date of birth: 11 February 1900
- Place of birth: Chester-le-Street, County Durham, England
- Date of death: 11 November 1923 (aged 23)
- Place of death: Perry Barr, Warwickshire, England
- Height: 5 ft 10 in (1.78 m)
- Position: Centre-half

Youth career
- Usworth Central School
- Wadley Colliery
- Felling Colliery

Senior career*
Years	Team	Apps	(Gls)
1919–1920	Newcastle United	0	(0)
1920–1923	Aston Villa	74	(0)
- * Club domestic league appearances and goals

Thomas Edgar Ball (11 February 1900 – 11 November 1923) was an English footballer who played at centre-half for Aston Villa. He was shot dead by his landlord and neighbour, ex-policeman George Stagg, thus becoming the first and to-date only active Football League player in England to have been murdered.

== Football career ==
Ball was born in Chester-le-Street, County Durham in North-east England, and was brought up in nearby Usworth. He played football for his school, winning a medal as a ten-year-old. After school he worked as a coalminer, playing for various colliery teams, before being signed by Newcastle United.

He made no first-team appearances for Newcastle before moving to the West Midlands to join Aston Villa of the Football League First Division in January 1920, where he was seen as cover for Frank Barson. His first-team appearances were limited until Barson left Villa in August 1922 after which Ball became the first-choice centre-half, making 36 appearances in the 1922–23 season, at the end of which Villa finished sixth in the league table. In the following season, he continued to perform well at the heart of Villa's defence and he was forecast to be called up to play for England.

His last game for Villa came on 10 November 1923 with a 1–0 victory at Notts County's Meadow Lane ground; this result left Villa third in the league table. By this time, Ball had made a total of 77 appearances in league and cup matches.

== Personal life and death ==
In May 1922, Ball married Beatrice Richards, the daughter of a local pork butcher and pie maker. In October, the couple moved into Somerville Cottages, on Brick Kiln Lane (now Beeches Road), Perry Barr which they rented from George Stagg, who occupied the adjoining cottage. Stagg was a former City of Birmingham Police officer who had been injured during the First World War; after the war, he had taken various factory jobs before purchasing the Brick Kiln Lane properties in 1921. The relationship between Stagg and Ball was strained, with Stagg objecting to Ball's chickens straying into his garden; Stagg had threatened to poison the chickens and had made attempts to have Ball evicted from the cottage.

On the evening of Sunday 11 November, the day after the match at Nottingham, Ball and his wife had visited the Church Tavern where Ball drank 3 1/2 pints of ale. They returned home late in the evening and, shortly after 10 pm Ball had gone into his garden to fetch his dog. Beatrice heard an argument in the garden followed by a gunshot. She ran out into the garden where she saw her husband "in a very distressed state, reeling towards her". Beatrice claimed that Stagg shot again with the bullet passing over her shoulder. This is one of several claims from Mrs Ball which do not fit the evidence presented during the case. Ball died shortly afterwards from the gunshot wounds. Stagg made no attempt to flee and was arrested by the police at the scene.

Ball's funeral was held on 19 November, and has been described as "a grand occasion". The funeral cortege set off from the butcher's shop of Beatrice Ball's father, William Richards, in High Street, Aston; seven coaches and several cars made their way through the crowds lining the streets to the packed St. John's Church, Perry Barr where the coffin was carried by Ball's former teammates. There were floral tributes from local football clubs, as well as from Middlesbrough, close to his birthplace. A collection among the crowd at Aston Villa's home match on the Saturday before the funeral raised over a hundred pounds for Ball's widow.

Ball was buried in St. John's churchyard in an ornate grave decorated with footballs. The grave bears the inscription: "To T.E. Ball – A token of esteem from his fellow players of Aston Villa F.C." The grave's condition deteriorated over the years but has been restored by Aston Villa supporters.

The following poem was written shortly after Ball's murder:

Twas on a Sabbath evening in drear November days
Two friends were heard creating, in Perry Barry's byways
High words just fed the anger, now this young man's life is fled.
A shot and then another! And Thomas Ball lies dead.

== Murder trial ==
At the coroner's inquest into Ball's death, Stagg admitted the killing but claimed it had been an accident. He claimed that he had fired the gun in order to frighten Ball and that Ball was shot as he attempted to grab the gun. The jury rejected this argument, returning a verdict of "wilful murder", and Stagg was committed for trial at Stafford Assizes.

The murder trial was heard in February 1924 in front of Mr. Justice Rowlatt. Stagg continued to claim that the killing was an accident and that he first fired the gun when Ball (allegedly "under the influence of drink") started to climb over the gate following an argument. There then followed a fight where Ball tried to wrench the gun away from Stagg; as Stagg fell back, the gun discharged accidentally, killing Ball. Stagg also claimed that Ball had threatened to attack Mrs. Stagg who was watching from a first-floor window: "I will come up and dash your brains out" and that Beatrice Ball had later said "He would not have hurt Mrs. Stagg, although he kicks me about". This was refuted at the trial by Mrs. Ball who "emphatically denied" that her husband had ever hit her. The Aston Villa trainer, Alf Miles, was called as a witness saying that Ball was a "good living man – always in the best of condition". The mental state of Stagg was not raised in the trial but he was probably carrying trauma from his wartime service. The killing took place on the first Armistice Day Sunday. In addition, Stagg's son had just left home to emigrate to Australia.

In his summing up, Mr. Justice Rowlatt instructed the jury not to show too much sympathy towards Stagg, but "to look at the facts dispassionately". Although there was a conflict of evidence as to how Ball was killed and although there might have been no motive, "it might still be murder if a man might lose his temper against a person he did not like and commit an act of murder". If the gun was pointed at the victim and discharged on purpose, that was murder, whereas if it went off by accident during a struggle, that was manslaughter. After deliberating for an hour and forty minutes, the jury returned a verdict of "wilful murder" with a recommendation of mercy. Despite this, Mr. Justice Rowlatt passed a sentence of death.

Stagg was refused leave to appeal, but his sentence was commuted to life imprisonment as part of the reforms introduced by the newly elected Labour Government. Stagg was subsequently declared "insane" and was incarcerated in Broadmoor Hospital. He eventually died in a Birmingham mental hospital in February 1966, aged 87.
