= Jack Howcroft =

English football referee

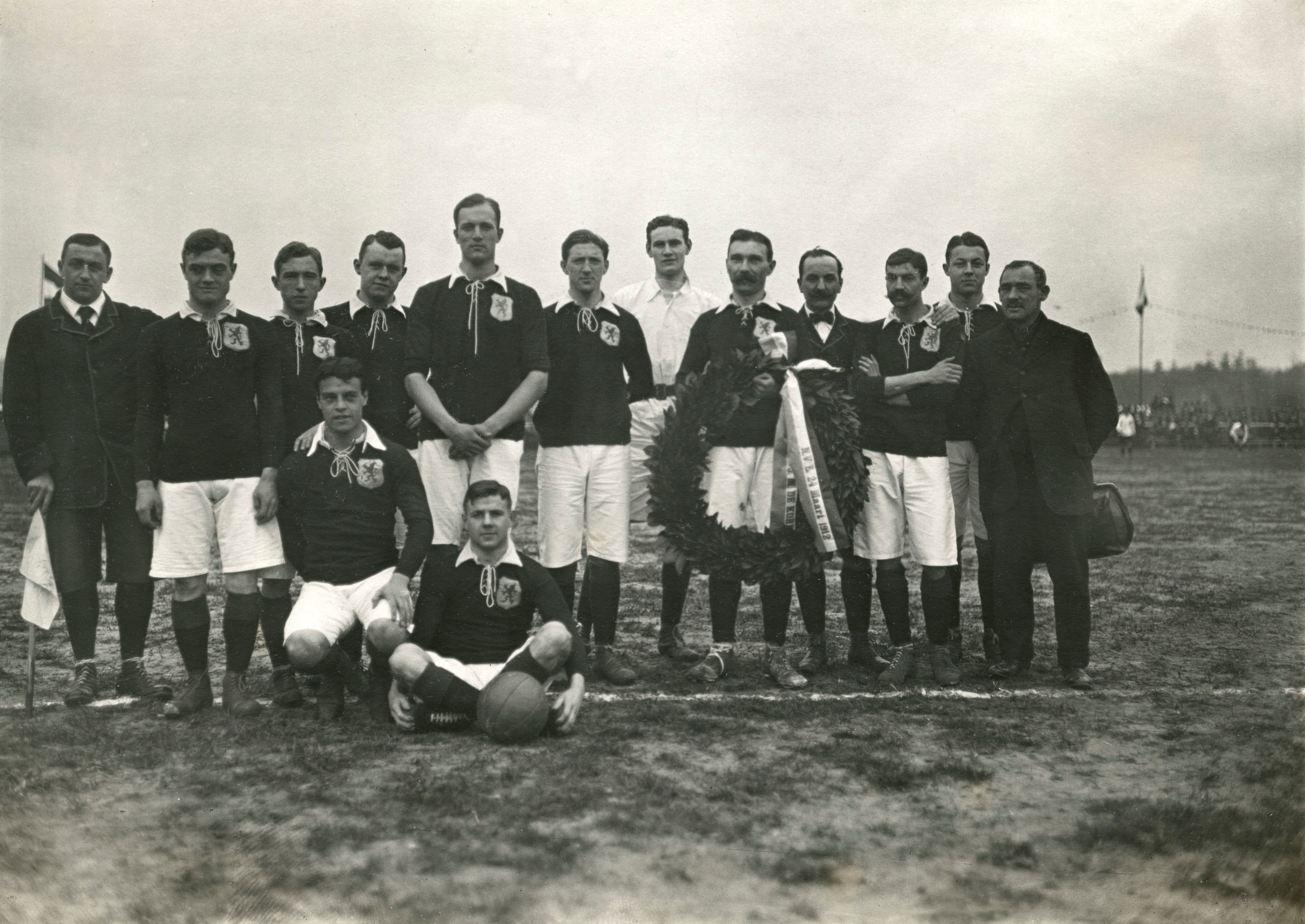
- Howcroft (in white) in 1912
- Full name: John Thomas Howcroft
- Born: 23 October 1874; Bolton, England
- Died: 27 December 1962 (aged 88); Southport, England

Domestic
| Years | League | Role |
| 1895–1925 | Football League First Division | Referee |

International
| Years | League | Role |
| 1908–21 | FIFA listed | Referee |

John Thomas "Jack" Howcroft (23 October 1874 – 27 December 1962) was an English football referee who officiated 18 international matches between 1908 and 1921. He also refereed the 1920 FA Cup final between Aston Villa and Huddersfield Town at Stamford Bridge.

== Refereeing career ==
=== National career ===
Howcroft began refereeing matches in FA competitions in the mid-1890s, when he was still a teenager; for instance, on 24 February 1894, the 19-year-old Howcroft oversaw a quarter-final clash of the 1893–94 FA Cup between Derby County and Blackburn Rovers. He was a referee in the Football League First Division for three decades, from 1895, aged 20, until 1925, aged 50. Throughout his career, Howcroft refereed a total of 22 Chelsea matches between 1905 and 1925, as well as 32 matches of Nottingham Forest between 1902 and 1924, which ended in 12 wins, 9 draws, and 11 losses.

In August 1908 he took charge of the replay of the inaugural edition of the FA Charity Shield at Stamford Bridge, between Football League champions Manchester United F.C. and Southern League champions Queens Park Rangers, which ended in a 4–0 win to the former. On one occasion, he oversaw a match between Glentoran and Belfast Celtic, where he was greeted by "a salute of umpteen revolvers" being fired in the air. In November 1923, following the first-ever short corner kick in a match between Liverpool and Everton at Goodison Park, Howcroft decided that he would penalize the act of dribbling from a corner with a free kick, stating "There is a mistake in the rules, and I do not think it would be in the interest of the game to let a corner kick be dribbled".

On 24 April 1920, the 45-year-old Howcroft refereed the 1920 FA Cup final, in which Aston Villa beat Huddersfield Town 1–0 at Stamford Bridge, thanks to a goal from Billy Kirton in extra-time. Before the start of the match, Howcroft went to the Villa dressing room where he allegedly told Frank Barson: "The first wrong move you make Barson, off you go!". Five years later, Howcroft was appointed as the referee of the 1925 FAI Cup final between Shamrock Rovers and Shelbourne, which ended in a 2–1 win to the former; his appointment had been initially met with some resistance from the Irish referees, who called a strike during the build-up for the final, but a journalist from Evening Herald managed to arrange a meeting between the disputing parties, and in the end, FAI's authority was recognized. Even though the English FA had adopted the practice that a referee only gets to oversee a Cup final once, the FAI took a different approach and appointed Howcroft for another final in 1927, with the next one being officiated by the famous Belgian referee John Langenus.

Noted as a strict disciplinarian, Howcroft was regarded as one of the best referees of his time, and thus much respected on the playing field, where his word was law. He was easily recognizable due to the black cap he always wore while officiating.

=== International career ===
Howcroft made his international debut on 26 April 1908, in a friendly match between the Netherlands and Belgium, which ended in a 3–1 win to the former. Later that year, in October, he refereed one match at the football tournament of the 1908 Olympic Games in London, the semi-final between the Netherlands and the eventual gold medal winners Great Britain. In total he refereed 18 international matches between 1908 and 1921, including competitive matches in the British Home Championship.

Throughout his international career, Howcroft became very popular on Continental Europe, using his international contacts, which he also gained through international matches, to help former British football players find coaching jobs abroad.

== Later life and death ==
After retiring, Howcroft contributed articles on football and refereeing to the daily newspaper Sunderland Daily Echo.

Howcroft died in Southport on 27 December 1962, at the age of 88.

== See also ==
FA Cup Final referees
