= 1928–29 Aston Villa F.C. season =

English football club season

Aston Villa
1928–29 season
- President: Patrick Hannon
- Manager: Billy Smith
- Stadium: Villa Park
- First Division: 5th
- FA Cup: Fourth round

Second City Derby
- 16--10--9

The 1928–29 English football season was Aston Villa's 37th season in The Football League. In June 1928, former Villa chairman Fred Rinder was elected to the Management Committee of the Football League.

In June 1928 Ben Olney kept the goal in England's 3–2 victory over the South African XI.

On 27 August captain, Frank Moss, was sent off in the match v Manchester United. The club suspended Moss for a month and placed him on the transfer list.

Dicky York rediscovered his scoring form with 18 strikes in 48 matches in 1928–29.

In the Second City derby both teams won their away fixtures. Joe Beresford, Pongo Waring and Billy Walker (2) scored in the 4–2 victory at St Andrews.

In December Villa beat Everton to go 4th in the Championship. Norman Swales was the only player to debut this season. He would make eight club appearances.

== Table ==
Pos	Team	Pld	W	D	L	GF	GA	GAv	Pts
1	The Wednesday (C)	42	21	10	11	86	62	1.387	52
2	Leicester City	42	21	9	12	96	67	1.433	51
3	Aston Villa	42	23	4	15	98	81	1.210	50
4	Sunderland	42	20	7	15	93	75	1.240	47
5	Liverpool	42	17	12	13	90	64	1.406	46

Source: World Football
Rules for classification: 1) Points; 2) Goal average; 3) Goals scored
(C) Champions

=== Matches ===
25 August 1928	Leeds United	4–1	Aston Villa	Elland Road
		Report	Dicky York (48')

27 August 1928	Aston Villa	0–0	Manchester United	Villa Park
		Report

1 September 1928	Aston Villa	3–1	Liverpool	Villa Park
	Joe Beresford (30'), Dicky York (44'), Len Capewell (81')	Report

8 September 1928	West Ham United	4–1	Aston Villa	Boleyn Ground
		Report	Len Capewell (20')

15 September 1928	Aston Villa	1–1	Newcastle United	Villa Park
	Reg Chester (14')	Report

22 September 1928	Burnley	4–1	Aston Villa	Turf Moor
		Report	Reg Chester (71')

29 September 1928	Aston Villa	1–0	Cardiff City	Villa Park
	Dicky York (14')	Report

6 October 1928	Sheffield United	1–3	Aston Villa	Bramall Lane
		Report	Pongo Waring (38', 57'), Arthur Dorrell (85')

13 October 1928	Aston Villa	7–1	Bury	Villa Park
	Billy Walker (4'), Pongo Waring (6', 65'), Arthur Dorrell (22'), Dicky York (29', 47', 86')	Report

20 October 1928	Aston Villa	3–5	Bolton Wanderers	Villa Park
	Billy Walker (27', 36'), Arthur Dorrell (40')	Report

27 October 1928	Birmingham	2–4	Aston Villa	St Andrew's
		Report	Pongo Waring (3'), Billy Walker (51', 85'), Joe Beresford (77')

3 November 1928	Aston Villa	2–3	Derby County	Villa Park
	Billy Walker (70'), Arthur Dorrell (80')	Report

10 November 1928	Sunderland	1–3	Aston Villa	Roker Park
		Report	Alec Talbot (2'), Billy Walker (23', 81')

17 November 1928	Aston Villa	2–1	Blackburn Rovers	Villa Park
	Joe Beresford (4', 74')	Report

24 November 1928	Arsenal	2–5	Aston Villa	Highbury
		Report	Pongo Waring (12', 17', 86'), Dicky York (23'), Alec Talbot (40')

1 December 1928	Aston Villa	2–0	Everton	Villa Park
	Pongo Waring (35'), Billy Walker (80')	Report

8 December 1928	Huddersfield Town	3–0	Aston Villa	Leeds Road
		Report

19 December 1928	Aston Villa	5–1	Manchester City	Villa Park
	Jimmy Gibson (6'), Joe Beresford (17', 41'), Dicky York (29', 69')	Report

22 December 1928	Sheffield Wednesday	4–1	Aston Villa	Hillsborough
		Report	Jimmy Gibson (46')

25 December 1928	Portsmouth	3–2	Aston Villa	Fratton Park
		Report	Joe Beresford, Arthur Dorrell

26 December 1928	Aston Villa	3–2	Portsmouth	Villa Park
	Pongo Waring (2'), Joe Beresford (15'), Billy Walker (37')	Report

29 December 1928	Aston Villa	1–0	Leeds United	Villa Park
	Pongo Waring (41')	Report

1 January 1929	Manchester United	2–2	Aston Villa	Old Trafford
			Pongo Waring (31', 34')

5 January 1929	Liverpool	4–0	Aston Villa	Anfield
			—

19 January 1929	Aston Villa	5–2	West Ham United	Villa Park
	Joe Beresford (4'), Reg Chester (27', 87'), Billy Walker (52'), Dicky York (72')

2 February 1929	Aston Villa	4–2	Burnley	Villa Park
	Pongo Waring (22', 40', 60'), Dicky York (54')

9 February 1929	Cardiff City	0–2	Aston Villa	Ninian Park
			Joe Beresford (22'), Billy Cook (26')

20 February 1929	Aston Villa	3–2	Sheffield United	Villa Park
	Pongo Waring (58'), Dicky York

23 February 1929	Bury	2–2	Aston Villa	Gigg Lane
			Tommy Smart (38'), Billy Walker (54')

9 March 1929	Aston Villa	1–2	Birmingham	Villa Park
	Pongo Waring (15')

13 March 1929	Newcastle United	2–1	Aston Villa	St James' Park
			Dicky York (10')

16 March 1929	Derby County	1–0	Aston Villa	Baseball Ground
			—

25 March 1929	Aston Villa	3–1	Sunderland	Villa Park
	Own goal (10'), Billy Cook (23'), Pongo Waring (60')

30 March 1929	Blackburn Rovers	2–5	Aston Villa	Ewood Park
			Billy Walker (5', 68'), Arthur Dorrell (74'), Pongo Waring (84'), Billy Cook (89')

1 April 1929	Leicester City	4–1	Aston Villa	Filbert Street
			Len Capewell (69')

2 April 1929	Aston Villa	4–2	Leicester City	Villa Park
	Billy Walker (1', 15'), Reg Chester (6'), Pongo Waring (36')

6 April 1929	Aston Villa	4–2	Arsenal	Villa Park
	Joe Beresford (6'), Dicky York (34'), Billy Walker (39'), Pongo Waring (52')

13 April 1929	Everton	0–1	Aston Villa	Goodison Park
			Pongo Waring (20')

17 April 1929	Bolton Wanderers	3–1	Aston Villa	Burnden Park
			Pongo Waring (11')

20 April 1929	Aston Villa	4–1	Huddersfield Town	Villa Park
	Reg Chester (4', 21', 70'), Billy Walker (72')

27 April 1929	Manchester City	3–0	Aston Villa	Maine Road
			—

4 May 1929	Aston Villa	4–1	Sheffield Wednesday	Villa Park
	Reg Chester, Dicky York (40'), Pongo Waring (74'), Billy Walker (78')

Source: avfchistory.co.uk

== See also ==
- List of Aston Villa F.C. records and statistics
