= Joe Davison =

Joe Davison may refer to:

- Joe Davison (footballer, born 1897) (1897–1965), English footballer who played for Middlesbrough, Portsmouth and Watford in the 1920s and 1930s
- Joe Davison (footballer, born 1919) (1919–1983), English footballer who played for Darlington in the 1940s and 1950s
