= Alec Talbot =

English footballer

Alec Talbot (13 July 1902 – 13 August 1975) was an English footballer who played as a centre-half for Aston Villa during the 1920s and 1930s.

Talbot signed as a professional for Villa in April 1923, immediately after completing a 10-hour shift down the mines at the colliery in Cannock. He broke into the Villa side in 1924–25, making the position his own from 1928-29 until 1934–35. Talbot assumed the role of club captain on the retirement of Villa great Billy Walker. In all he made 263 appearances, scoring 7 goals for the club.

Talbot sailed North to Sweden with the team on Aston Villa's first foreign tour in May 1926. Örgryte celebrated a major success when beating Aston Villa 5–2. Villa were defeated by Gothenburg-combined (Kombinerol Gotesburgslag). There followed a golf & fishing break where Talbot took advantage of the opportunity to join the fishing party. Villa won 11 - 2 over the select Oslo-combined Lyn og Frig including FK Lyn players.

In the 1931–32 season, Talbot made 45 appearances, the most of any player.

Talbot left Villa for Bradford in June 1935, staying there until the outbreak of World War II.

After the war Talbot started his own dairy business in Stourbridge.
