= Jock Johnstone =

Scottish footballer

Personal information
- Full name: John Chalmers Johnstone
- Date of birth: 23 June 1898
- Place of birth: Dundee, Scotland
- Date of death: 3 November 1936 (aged 38)
- Place of death: Birmingham, England
- Height: 5 ft 10 1/2 in (1.79 m)
- Position: Right half

Senior career*
Years	Team	Apps	(Gls)
- Dundee Hibernian
1919–1920	Montrose		
1920–1922	Dundee	13	(1)
1922–1928	Aston Villa	106	(1)
1928–1929	Reading	6	(0)
- * Club domestic league appearances and goals

John Chalmers Johnstone (23 June 1898 – 3 November 1936) was a Scottish footballer who played for Dundee, Aston Villa and Reading, mainly as a right half.

He played twice in Aston Villa's run to the 1924 FA Cup Final, but did not take part in the match itself; this was indicative of his struggles over several seasons to be selected ahead of Frank Moss and George Blackburn, both of whom were England internationals.

He sailed North to Sweden with the team on Aston Villa's first foreign tour in May 1926. Örgryte celebrated a major success when beating Aston Villa 5–2. Villa were defeated by Gothenburg-combined (Kombinerol Gotesburgslag). There followed a golf & fishing break where Johnstone took advantage of the opportunity to join the fishing party. Villa won 11 - 2 over the select Oslo-combined Lyn og Frig including FK Lyn players.
