= Frank Barson =

English footballer (1891–1968)

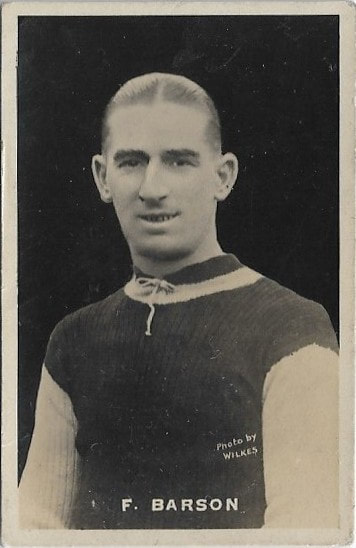

Personal information
- Date of birth: 10 April 1891
- Place of birth: Grimesthorpe, Sheffield, England
- Date of death: 13 September 1968 (aged 77)
- Place of death: Winson Green, Birmingham, England
- Height: 6 ft 0 in (1.83 m)
- Position: Half back

Youth career
- Firshill Council
- Grimesthorpe schools
- Albion FC
- Cammell Laird's

Senior career*
Years	Team	Apps	(Gls)
1911–1919	Barnsley	91	(0)
1919–1922	Aston Villa	92	(10)
1922–1928	Manchester United	140	(4)
1928–1929	Watford	10	(1)
1929–1930	Hartlepool United	9	(2)
1930–1931	Wigan Borough	19	(0)
1932–1935	Rhyl Athletic	?	(?)

International career
1920	England	1	(0)

Managerial career
- 1932–1935: Rhyl Athletic
- * Club domestic league appearances and goals

Frank Barson (10 April 1891 – 13 August 1968) was an English footballer from Grimesthorpe who played for several English football clubs including Barnsley, Manchester United, Aston Villa and Watford. He had a reputation for aggressive play, and is regarded as one of the "hard men" of English football.

The third of six children, Barson was born in Sheffield in 1891 to William and Agnes Barson and began his career working as a blacksmith and playing for amateur clubs Albion FC and Cammell Laird's, before joining Barnsley Football Club in 1911. He transferred to Aston Villa in 1919, with whom he won the FA Cup in 1920, and to Manchester United in 1922, with a transfer fee of £5,000.

On one occasion, Barson's hard tackling resulted in a seven-month ban; after a game, he often needed a police escort to protect him from angry opposition fans.

== Club career ==
=== Barnsley ===
In 1909, Barson signed for Cammell Laird FC; two years later in July 1911 he began his professional career with Barnsley. It was whilst at Oakwell that his notorious temper first became evident. Before he could start his first game for the Tykes he had to serve a two-month suspension following an ugly brawl with some Birmingham City players in a pre-season friendly. On one occasion Barson had to be smuggled out of Goodison Park to avoid a large crowd who had gathered outside the ground to discuss with him his behaviour in an FA Cup tie with Everton. After a very public fall out with the Barnsley directors over travelling expenses, he joined Aston Villa in October 1919.

=== Aston Villa ===
Barson joined Villa for a fee of £2,850 – "more than the average Sheffield worker earned in a year", according to a Sheffield newspaper – after persuasion from George Ramsay, who was rebuilding Villa after the First World War. In October 1919, he made his debut in a 4–1 win at Middlesbrough. Barson played a large part in the Villa team during his three seasons at the club, but it is his run-ins with authority for which he is best known.

He maintained a business in Sheffield and refused to move to Birmingham despite Villa's insistence that he should do so. His living arrangements caused further controversy on the opening day of the 1920–21 season and he was suspended by the Villa board for fourteen days but Barson still refused to move. In fact, he was appointed captain in succession to Andy Ducat, although it is not known whether he merely decided he wanted the job and nobody dared argue with him. He celebrated his first game as captain by scoring a header from thirty yards out against Sheffield United.

One story about Frank Barson concerned the 1920 FA Cup Final, when he was warned about his behaviour by referee Jack Howcroft in the dressing room before the match started. "The first wrong move you make Barson, off you go" he was told. Villa went on to win the FA Cup, Barson's only club honour in his career. His FA Cup winners medal has been sold twice and fetched £6,000. He also went on to win one cap for England at his time with the club.

The beginning of the end to his time at Villa came following a match against Liverpool. Barson invited a friend of his to wait in the dressing room while he got changed, and this drew a rebuke from a director, a seven-day suspension was the result and Barson handed in a transfer request. With Tommy Ball proving an adequate replacement, the board agreed to his request. During his time with Villa, Barson made 108 appearances, scoring 10 goals.

He was later Youth team coach and First team coach for Aston Villa.

=== Manchester United ===
In 1922, he was transferred to Manchester United for a fee of £5,000. He spent an injury-plagued six years at Old Trafford, making 140 League appearances and scoring four goals for the club. While Barson's United appearances were punctuated by injury, when he did play he was known for his on-field leadership, being selected as captain and helping United to win promotion at the end of 1924–25. For gaining promotion he was given a pub in Manchester. At the time he was regarded as a hero, but Barson was so sick of such attention that on the opening night of his pub he gave the business to his head waiter. He then joined Watford in May 1928.

=== Watford ===
Division Three South side Watford signed Barson on a free transfer three days after the end of the 1927–28 season. His signing was considered a coup for the club, as Barson's availability had caused "20 managers to lounge round outside the defender's house."

In his debut at Crystal Palace, Barson was cautioned early in the game. Watford's Joe Davison was later sent off in that game with the referee reportedly saying "Off you go, Barson". In late September 1928, Barson was sent off in a home game against Fulham. After tangling legs with Fulham's Temple, Barson was adjudged to have kicked out at him, although both Watford and Fulham players argued that it had not happened. Although a petition of 5,000 signatures arguing Barson's unfair treatment was presented to the Football Association by Watford's mayor, Barson was suspended for six months. Watford's chairman, John Kilby, spoke out against the decision, citing that a player had recently been suspended for three months for striking a referee. Barson's case was argued for in local and national newspapers, but the revelation that the petition had been burnt at the FA headquarters caused the affair to die down. The suspension stopped Barson from participating in the remainder of the season, and he was released from his contract.

Although his Watford career was brief, Barson did recommend two Manchester United players, Tommy Barnett and Frank McPherson, to Fred Pagnam, the Watford manager. Both went on to have successful careers at Vicarage Road. Barnett called Barson "the best skipper I was to ever play under" and stated how he used to sweat off excess beer with exercises before the game.

=== Final years ===
After a year with Watford, his next move was to join Hartlepools United. Playing once again under ex-Barnsley trainer Bill Norman, his time there was blighted with illness with him being hospitalised for a spell with appendicitis. He had two short spells in the first team, but at the end of the season was once again looking to find a new club. He joined Wigan Borough in July 1930 ahead of what would be Borough's last complete season as a Football League club. Barson was the club's highest paid player and in an ultimately unsuccessful effort to stabilise the club's terrible finances he was off-loaded to Rhyl Athletic in June 1931. He was 39 at the time and at the end of his career but he appeared 19 times in a Wigan shirt. One of his last appearances was against Accrington Stanley on Boxing Day 1930 with him being sent off in the 83rd minute.

== International career ==
In 1920, Barson had England trials and he made his only international appearance for England on 15 March 1920 against Wales at Highbury. Wales won the game 2–1.

== Discipline ==
Barson was regarded as a "hard man" of English football. On frequent occasions Barson was escorted out of grounds by policemen to protect him from groups of angry opposition fans. Opposing crowds loathed him, forcing Barson to publicly defend himself on the grounds that he had been "brought up to play hard and saw nothing wrong with an honest to goodness shoulder charge." One violent challenge in a match against Fulham resulted in a seven-month ban.

== Coaching career ==
In May 1932 he became the player manager of Rhyl, where he remained until his contract was terminated in March 1935. Within three months he re-surfaced as the manager of Stourbridge but an offer to return to Aston Villa as youth coach in July 1935 meant he gave up the job as soon as a replacement was found.Three months after his appointment as youth coach, he became the senior coach and head trainer at Villa Park until the outbreak of the Second World War. Barson's home suffered bomb damage during the war.

Barson became the trainer at Swansea Town from June 1947 until February 1954 and he finished his career in May 1956 after previously spending almost two seasons as the trainer at Lye Town.

== Legacy ==
Perhaps the greatest of all the great characters in my album – he played with and against me – was the one and only Frank Barson. Frank was a Sheffielder, a truly great footballer and personality and a card. He was never ashamed of numbering amongst his friends the notorious Fowler brothers, who were hanged for murder.

— Billy Walker

== Personal life ==
Before becoming a full-time footballer, Barson was an iron hoop maker. He was married to Frances Evelyn Betton in 1915, and died on 13 September 1968 at Winson Green, Birmingham, at the age of 77.

== Honours ==
Aston Villa

- FA Cup: 1919–20
