= 1922–23 Aston Villa F.C. season =

English football club season

Aston Villa
1922–23 season
- Chairman: Frederick Rinder
- Manager: George Ramsay
- First Division: 6th
- FA Cup: First round

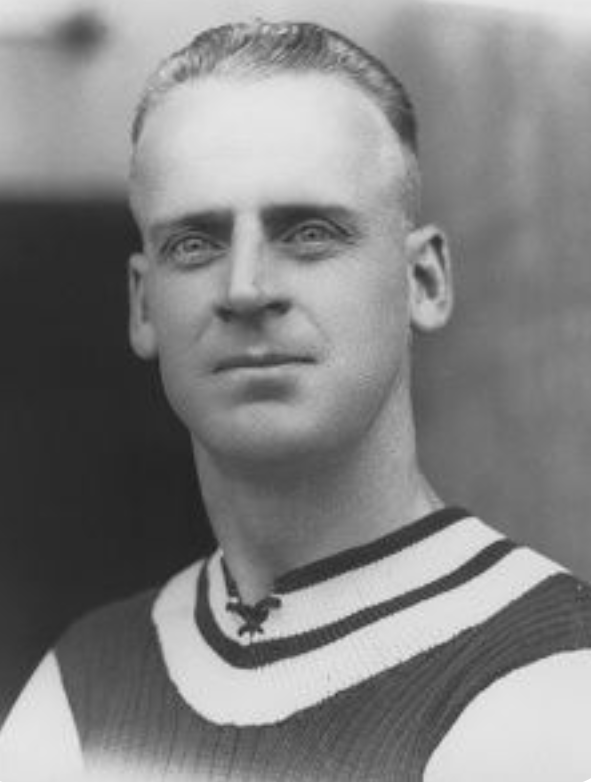
A one-club man, Billy Walker scored 244 goals in 531 appearances for Villa between 1920 and 1934. He is Aston Villa's all-time top goalscorer.

The 1922–23 English football season was Aston Villa's 31st season in The Football League.

There were debuts for Cecil Harris (26), John Roxborough (12), and William Adshead (2).

Second City Derby
- 12--6--5

== Table ==
Pos	Team	Pld	W	D	L	GF	GA	GAv	Pts
4	Newcastle United	42	18	12	12	45	37	1.216	48
5	Everton	42	20	7	15	63	59	1.068	47
6	Aston Villa	42	18	10	14	64	51	1.255	46
7	West Bromwich Albion	42	17	11	14	58	49	1.184	45
8	Manchester City	42	17	11	14	50	49	1.020	45

Source: World Football
Rules for classification: 1) Points; 2) Goal average; 3) Goals scored

=== Matches ===
26 August 1922	Aston Villa	2–0	Blackburn Rovers	Villa Park
	(Billy Kirton) (Billy Walker)	Report
Note: Aston Villa started the season with a 2–0 victory over Blackburn Rovers, with Billy Walker and Billy Kirton scoring.

28 August 1922	Cardiff City	3–0	Aston Villa	Ninian Park
		Report
Note: Cardiff recorded its first win of the season by defeating Aston Villa 3–0 at Ninian Park after a brace from Clennell and one goal from Billy Grimshaw.

2 September 1922	Blackburn Rovers	4–2	Aston Villa	Ewood Park
		Report	(Dicky York) (Billy Kirton)
Note: Dicky York scored nine goals in 37 games in 1922–23.

4 September 1922	Aston Villa	1–3	Cardiff City	Villa Park
	(William Barnie-Adshead)	Report

9 September 1922	Aston Villa	2–0	West Bromwich Albion	Villa Park
	(Len Capewell)	Report

16 September 1922	West Bromwich Albion	3–0	Aston Villa	The Hawthorns
		Report

23 September 1922	Aston Villa	2–2	Middlesbrough	Villa Park
	(Ian Dickson) (Arthur Dorrell)	Report

30 September 1922	Middlesbrough	2–2	Aston Villa	Ayresome Park
		Report	(Billy Kirton) (Billy Walker)

7 October 1922	Aston Villa	2–0	Tottenham Hotspur	Villa Park
	(Arthur Dorrell) (Arthur Dorrell)	Report

14 October 1922	Tottenham Hotspur	1–2	Aston Villa	White Hart Lane
		Report	(Ian Dickson) (Billy Walker)

21 October 1922	Aston Villa	2–0	Bolton Wanderers	Villa Park
	(Billy Walker) (Dicky York)	Report

28 October 1922	Bolton Wanderers	3–0	Aston Villa	Burnden Park
		Report

4 November 1922	Oldham Athletic	0–2	Aston Villa	Boundary Park
		Report	(Billy Kirton) (Billy Walker)

11 November 1922	Aston Villa	3–0	Oldham Athletic	Villa Park
	(Dicky York) (Billy Kirton) (Billy Kirton)	Report

18 November 1922	Liverpool	3–0	Aston Villa	Anfield
		Report

25 November 1922	Aston Villa	0–1	Liverpool	Villa Park
		Report

2 December 1922	Sheffield United	1–1	Aston Villa	Bramall Lane
		Report	(Billy Walker)

9 December 1922	Aston Villa	0–1	Sheffield United	Villa Park
		Report

16 December 1922	Aston Villa	1–1	Newcastle United	Villa Park
	(Dicky York)	Report

23 December 1922	Newcastle United	0–0	Aston Villa	St James’ Park
		Report

25 December 1922	Burnley	1–1	Aston Villa	Turf Moor
		Report	(Dicky York)

26 December 1922	Aston Villa	3–1	Burnley	Villa Park
	(Dicky York) (Dicky York) (Dicky York)	Report

30 December 1922	Aston Villa	1–0	Preston North End	Villa Park
	(Billy Walker)	Report

6 January 1923	Preston North End	3–2	Aston Villa	Deepdale
	(Billy Dickson) (Own goal)	Report

20 January 1923	Nottingham Forest	3–1	Aston Villa	City Ground
		Report	(Arthur Dorrell)

27 January 1923	Aston Villa	4–0	Nottingham Forest	Villa Park
		Report	(Arthur Dorrell) (Ian Dickson) (Ian Dickson) (Billy Walker)

3 February 1923	Aston Villa	2–0	Manchester City	Villa Park
	(Dicky York) (Billy Walker)	Report

10 February 1923	Manchester City	1–1	Aston Villa	Hyde Road
		Report	(Len Capewell)

17 February 1923	Aston Villa	6–0	Stoke City	Villa Park
	(Ian Dickson) (Ian Dickson) (John Roxborough) (John Roxborough) (Billy Walker)	Report

24 February 1923	Stoke City	1–1	Aston Villa	Victoria Ground
		Report	(Billy Walker)

3 March 1923	Aston Villa	2–1	Huddersfield Town	Villa Park
	(John Roxborough)	Report
Note: Huddersfield recorded their biggest loss 3–5 vs Aston Villa on 10 March 1923.

10 March 1923	Huddersfield Town	3–5	Aston Villa	Leeds Road
		Report	(Billy Walker) (Billy Walker) (Billy Walker) (Len Capewell) (Arthur Dorrell)
Note:

17 March 1923	Birmingham City	1–0	Aston Villa	St Andrew’s
		Report
Note: In the Second City Derby, both teams won their home fixtures.

24 March 1923	Aston Villa	3–0	Birmingham City	Villa Park
	(Len Capewell) (Billy Walker) (Billy Walker)	Report
Note: In the Second City Derby, both teams won their home fixtures. Billy Walker converted two penalties.

30 March 1923	Aston Villa	1–0	Chelsea	Villa Park
	(Billy Walker)	Report

31 March 1923	Arsenal	2–0	Aston Villa	Highbury
		Report

2 April 1923	Chelsea	1–1	Aston Villa	Stamford Bridge
		Report	(Billy Walker)

7 April 1923	Aston Villa	1–1	Arsenal	Villa Park
	(Billy Walker)	Report

14 April 1923	Everton	2–1	Aston Villa	Goodison Park
		Report	(Len Capewell)

21 April 1923	Aston Villa	3–0	Everton	Villa Park
	(Billy Walker) (Billy Walker) (Billy Kirton)	Report

28 April 1923	Sunderland	2–0	Aston Villa	Roker Park
		Report

5 May 1923	Aston Villa	1–0	Sunderland	Villa Park
	(Len Capewell)	Report

Source: avfchistory.co.uk

== FA Cup ==
=== First round ===
41 of 44 clubs from the Football League First and Second Divisions joined the 12 lower-league clubs who came through the qualifying rounds. To bring the number of teams up to 64, nine Third Division South sides and one Third Division North side were given byes to this round.

The Football Association also began the custom of awarding leading London amateur club Corinthian a bye to the same stage of the tournament as the Football League First Division sides. Corinthian would receive these byes for a further ten seasons, but the club's members had to ratify a special constitutional amendment for it to do so as its founding document initially prevented it from competing for "any challenge cup or any prize of any description"!

32 matches were scheduled to be played on Saturday, 13 January 1923. Twelve matches were drawn and went to replays in the following midweek fixture, of which three went to another replay, and one match went to a third.

Tie no	Home team	Score	Away team	Date
7	Aston Villa	0–1	Blackburn Rovers	13 January 1923

== See also ==
- List of Aston Villa F.C. records and statistics

== Sources ==
- Shepherd, Richard (2002). The Definitive: Cardiff City F.C. Nottingham: SoccerData Publications. ISBN 978-1-899468-17-1.
