= Frank Moss (footballer, born 1895) =

English footballer

Personal information
- Full name: Frank Moss
- Date of birth: 17 April 1895
- Place of birth: Aston, England
- Date of death: 15 September 1965 (aged 70)
- Place of death: Worcester, England
- Height: 5 ft 11 in (1.80 m)
- Position: Wing half

Youth career
- Burlington Street
- –1912: Aston Manor

Senior career*
Years	Team	Apps	(Gls)
1912–1914	Walsall		
1914–1929	Aston Villa	255	(9)
1929	Cardiff City	9	(0)
1929–1930	Bromsgrove Rovers		
- Worcester City

International career
1921–1924	England	5	(0)
	Football League XI	2	(0)

Managerial career
- 1929–1930: Bromsgrove Rovers (player-manager)
- * Club domestic league appearances and goals

Frank Moss (17 April 1895 – 15 September 1965) was an English professional footballer who made over 250 appearances as a wing half in the Football League for Aston Villa. He was capped by England at international level and represented the Football League XI.

== Club career ==
After beginning his career in local Birmingham football, Moss joined First Division club Aston Villa for a £250 fee in February 1914 and made two appearances late in the 1914–15 season, but he had to wait until after the First World War before he could begin his professional career in earnest. During the war, Moss guested for Bellis and Morcom, Aston Park Rangers, Smethwick Carriage Works and Bradford City. He captained the club and was a part of the Villa teams which won the 1919–20 FA Cup and finished runners-up in 1923–24. After a dispute over a testimonial and a ban from the FA, Moss departed Villa Park in January 1929, after making 255 appearances and scoring 9 goals for the club. He finished the 1928–29 season with First Division club Cardiff City and left to join Birmingham Combination club Bromsgrove Rovers as player-manager for the 1929–30 season. Moss finished his career with Worcester City.

== International career ==
Moss won five caps for England at international level and represented the Football League XI.

== Personal life ==
Moss attended Burlington Street School in Aston and as of 1911 was working as a canal boatman. He later married and had four children, two of whom became footballers – Amos and Frank Jr. In November 1915, 15 months after Britain's entry into the First World War, Moss enlisted as a private in the Lincolnshire Regiment. He saw action during the Third Battle of Ypres and shrapnel wounds to his left knee saw him sent back to Britain to be a physical training instructor. Moss ended the war with the rank of corporal. A decade after being wounded in the war, Moss declined the shrapnel being removed from his knee at the same time as undergoing a knee cartilage operation relating to his football career. The shrapnel remained in his knee until his death in 1965. According to a 1939 register, Moss was the licensed victualler of a hostelry in Worcester.

== Career statistics ==
Appearances and goals by club, season and competition
Club	Season	League			FA Cup		Total	
Club	Season	Division	Apps	Goals	Apps	Goals	Apps	Goals
Aston Villa	1914–15	First Division	2	0	0	0	2	0
Aston Villa	1919–20	First Division	16	0	2	0	18	0
Aston Villa	1920–21	First Division	32	1	4	0	36	1
Aston Villa	1921–22	First Division	35	3	6	0	41	3
Aston Villa	1922–23	First Division	32	2	1	0	33	2
Aston Villa	1923–24	First Division	34	0	4	0	38	0
Aston Villa	1924–25	First Division	19	2	3	0	22	2
Aston Villa	1925–26	First Division	31	0	4	0	35	0
Aston Villa	1926–27	First Division	35	1	1	0	36	1
Aston Villa	1927–28	First Division	17	0	3	0	20	0
Aston Villa	1928–29	First Division	2	0	0	0	2	0
Aston Villa	Total		255	9	28	0	283	9
Cardiff City	1928–29	First Division	9	0	—		9	0
Career total			264	9	28	0	292	9

== Honours ==
Aston Villa

- FA Cup: 1919–20; runner-up: 1923–24
