= George Stephenson (footballer, born 1900) =

English footballer and manager

Personal information
- Full name: George Ternent Stephenson
- Date of birth: 3 September 1900
- Place of birth: Seaton Delaval, Northumberland, England
- Date of death: 18 August 1971 (aged 70)
- Height: 5 ft 9 1/2 in (1.77 m)
- Position: Inside forward

Senior career*
| Years | Team | Apps | (Gls) |
| 1919–1927 | Aston Villa | 93 | (22) |
| 1927–1931 | Derby County | 111 | (53) |
| 1931–1933 | Sheffield Wednesday | 39 | (17) |
| 1933–1934 | Preston North End | 25 | (16) |
| 1934–1936 | Charlton Athletic | 50 | (12) |

International career
| 1928–1931 | England | 3 | (2) |

Managerial career
- 1947–1952: Huddersfield Town
- * Club domestic league appearances and goals

George Ternent Stephenson (3 September 1900 – 18 August 1971) was a professional manager at Huddersfield Town. He was the younger brother of the ex-Town player Clem Stephenson.

As a player, he spent the period from November 1919 to November 1927 with Aston Villa. The team sailed North to Sweden on their first foreign tour in May 1926. Örgryte celebrated a major success when beating Villa 5–2 and they were defeated by Gothenburg-combined (Kombinerol Gotesburgslag). Villa won 11–2 over the select Oslo-combined Lyn og Frig including FK Lyn & Frigg Oslo players. Len Capewell scored four, Billy Walker a hat-trick, Dorrell a brace, and Tommy Muldoon scored the goal of the game while Stephenson scored the other.

After four seasons at Derby County, he moved on to Sheffield Wednesday in 1931. He spent the 1933–34 season with Preston North End before spending the last three years of his career with Charlton Athletic where he retired in 1936.

He was also an England international, making two appearances in 1928, scoring twice against France on his debut on 17 May 1928. He made his third and final appearance for England on 14 May 1931.

His son Bob was also a professional footballer, playing for Derby County, Shrewsbury Town and Rochdale in the 1960s, as well as playing cricket for Derbyshire and Hampshire between 1967 and 1980.
