= Jack Thompson (1920s footballer) =

English footballer

Personal information
- Full name: John George Thompson (Note: There are multiple inconsistencies in reliable sources for Thompson's birth details, such that it appears that two different people might have been confused. Joyce's Football League Players' Records lists his given names as James Gilbert, where Carder & Harris's Albion A–Z and the Aston Villa Player Database (AVDB) have John George. Both Joyce and the AVDB have the same birth date and place, of July 1900 in Crewe, despite listing different birth names. Carder & Harris have no birth date, but list Cramlington as his birthplace, as does the Athletic News in its 1924–25 season preview. This article follows the contemporary Athletic News source and Carder & Harris.)
- Place of birth: Cramlington, England
- Height: 5 ft 10 in (1.78 m)
- Position: Right back

Senior career*
Years	Team	Apps	(Gls)
191?–1919	Ashington		
1919–1921	Aston Villa	26	(0)
1921–1925	Brighton & Hove Albion	94	(0)
- * Club domestic league appearances and goals

John George Thompson (active 1919–1927) was an English professional footballer who made 120 Football League appearances playing as a right back for Aston Villa and Brighton & Hove Albion.

== Life and career ==
Thompson was born in Cramlington, Northumberland. He played football for Ashington of the North-Eastern League before signing for Aston Villa in November 1919 for a fee reported as £300. He went straight into their team for the Football League First Division match against West Bromwich Albion: asked if he was nervous, he is reported to have replied "Why no, I fought against the Germans!" He made 17 appearances in what remained of the season, but played only 11 times in 1920–21 after losing his place to Tommy Smart.

Thompson signed for Brighton & Hove Albion of the Third Division South in August 1921. He was a first-team regular for three seasons, part of a defence that in 1922–23 set a club record for fewest goals conceded in a Football League season, of 34, that stood for more than 60 years. His professional career was ended by an ankle injury sustained during a match away against Norwich City in April 1924, and he went on to work as a bus driver in Brighton.
