= Jack Swann =

English footballer

Personal information
- Full name: John Swann
- Date of birth: 10 July 1892
- Place of birth: Seaham, County Durham, England
- Date of death: 1990 (aged 97–98)
- Height: 5 ft 10 in (1.78 m)
- Position: Striker

Senior career*
Years	Team	Apps	(Gls)
1919–1921	Huddersfield Town	67	(33)
1921–1925	Leeds United	108	(47)
1925–1927	Watford	54	(27)
1927–1928	Queens Park Rangers	28	(5)
Total		232	(112)
- * Club domestic league appearances and goals

John "Jack" Swann (born 10 July 1893 in Seaham, died January 1990) was an English footballer. During his career, Swann played for Leeds United, Huddersfield Town, Watford and Queens Park Rangers. He appeared in the 1920 FA Cup Final for Huddersfield. At Leeds, he helped the team win the Division 2 title, and went on to make over 100 appearances.

Huddersfield Town A.F.C. 1919–1920 Jack Swann is second from the right in the front row.

When Jack was almost 88 years old he attended the centenary FA Cup Final at Wembley as a VIP because he was the oldest surviving footballer from an FA Cup Final.

== Honours ==
Huddersfield Town

- FA Cup runner-up: 1919–20
