= Dicky York =

English footballer (1899–1969)

Personal information
- Full name: Richard Ernest York
- Date of birth: 25 April 1899
- Place of birth: Handsworth, Staffordshire, England
- Date of death: 9 December 1969 (aged 70)
- Place of death: Handsworth, England
- Height: 5 ft 9 1/2 in (1.77 m)
- Position: Winger

Youth career
- Handsworth Royal
- Birchfield Rangers
- 1915–1916: Aston Villa

Senior career*
Years	Team	Apps	(Gls)
1916–1931	Aston Villa	356	(79)
1931–1932	Port Vale	26	(5)
- Brierley Hill Alliance
Total		382+	(84+)

International career
1919–1920	England Schoolboys	2	(0)
1922–1926	England	2	(0)
	Football League	2	(0)
- * Club domestic league appearances and goals

Richard Ernest York (25 April 1899 – 9 December 1969), known as Dicky York (also spelled Dickie York), was an English footballer, who in addition to a long club career with Aston Villa in the Football League appeared twice for the England national team. A winger, he spent 16 years at Villa from 1915 to 1931 and was on the losing team in the 1924 FA Cup final. He later had brief spells with Port Vale and Brierley Hill Alliance.

== Early and personal life ==
Richard Ernest York was born on 25 April 1899 in Handsworth, Staffordshire. He was the eldest of two children to Richard and Edith Mary (née Bagley); his father was a press tool maker. York enlisted in the Army on 8 May 1917, and by April 1918 had transferred to the Royal Air Force. He married Constance G. Wright in 1923. He ran decorating and plumbing business in Birmingham after retiring from football.

== Club career ==
York started his career with his local clubs Handsworth Royal and Birchfield Rangers. In March 1915, he joined Aston Villa as a young amateur, signing professional forms in August 1919. He also guested for Chelsea and Boscombe Town during World War I. He scored one goal in 17 games for Villa in 1919–20, but did not feature in the 1920 FA Cup final, which ended in a 1–0 victory over Huddersfield Town at Stamford Bridge. He appeared just 11 times in 1920–21, before going on to make 47 appearances in the 1921–22 campaign, as the "Villans" finished fifth in the First Division. He scored nine goals in 37 games in 1922–23 and five goals in 43 games in 1923–24. He also appeared at Wembley in the 1924 FA Cup final, in a 2–0 defeat to Newcastle United. He scored seven goals in 34 matches in 1924–25, before hitting 20 goals in 44 appearances in 1925–26. He bagged 13 goals in 43 games in 1926–27, before being limited to just four goals in 30 appearances in 1927–28. He rediscovered his scoring form with 18 strikes in 48 matches in 1928–29, before hitting seven goals in 32 games in 1929–30. However, he played just four times in the 1930–31 campaign, as Villa finished second in the league with an English record of 128 top-flight league goals scored.

He joined Port Vale in June 1931, making his debut in a 3–1 win at Plymouth Argyle on 29 August. He was a first-team regular until he was struck by injury in December of that year. After his recovery he played infrequently, and ended the 1931–32 season with five goals in 26 Second Division appearances. He left the Old Recreation Ground and was transferred to Brierley Hill Alliance in August 1932.

== International career ==
He made two appearances for England, both 1–0 defeats to Scotland in April 1922 and April 1926.

== Career statistics ==
=== Club statistics ===
Appearances and goals by club, season and competition
Club	Season	League			FA Cup		Total	
Club	Season	Division	Apps	Goals	Apps	Goals	Apps	Goals
Aston Villa	1919–20	First Division	17	1	0	0	17	1
Aston Villa	1920–21	First Division	11	1	0	0	11	1
Aston Villa	1921–22	First Division	41	2	6	0	47	2
Aston Villa	1922–23	First Division	36	9	1	0	37	9
Aston Villa	1923–24	First Division	37	3	6	2	43	5
Aston Villa	1924–25	First Division	30	6	4	1	34	7
Aston Villa	1925–26	First Division	40	19	4	1	44	20
Aston Villa	1926–27	First Division	42	12	1	0	43	12
Aston Villa	1927–28	First Division	28	4	2	0	30	4
Aston Villa	1928–29	First Division	42	16	6	2	48	18
Aston Villa	1929–30	First Division	28	6	4	1	32	7
Aston Villa	1930–31	First Division	4	0	0	0	4	0
Aston Villa	Total		356	79	34	7	390	86
Port Vale	1931–32	Second Division	26	5	0	0	26	5
Career total			382	84	34	7	416	91

=== International statistics ===
England national team
Year	Apps	Goals
1922	1	0
1926	1	0
Total	2	0

== Honours ==
Aston Villa

- FA Cup runner-up: 1923–24
