= Archie Campbell (footballer, born 1904) =

English footballer

Personal information
- Full name: Archibald Campbell
- Date of birth: 15 August 1904
- Place of birth: Crook, County Durham, England
- Date of death: c. 1980 (aged 75–76)
- Height: 5 ft 8 1/4 in (1.73 m)
- Positions: Right half; centre half

Senior career*
| Years | Team | Apps | (Gls) |
| 19??–1922 | Spennymoor United | | |
| 1922–1925 | Aston Villa | 4 | (0) |
| 1925–1927 | Lincoln City | 54 | (4) |
| – | Craghead United | | |
| 1928–1930 | Dundee | | |
- * Club domestic league appearances and goals

Archibald Campbell (15 August 1904 – c. 1980) was an English footballer who made 58 appearances in the Football League playing for Aston Villa and Lincoln City. He played as a right half or centre half. He was a nephew of Scotland international and Celtic and Aston Villa player John Campbell.
