= Jimmy Lawrence (footballer, born 1891) =

English footballer

Personal information
- Full name: James Lawrence
- Date of birth: 7 March 1891
- Place of birth: Newton-le-Willows, England
- Date of death: 1970 (aged 78–79)
- Position: Full back

Senior career*
Years	Team	Apps	(Gls)
1915–1919	Earlestown Boys Club		
1919–1920	Aston Villa	13	(0)
1920–1925	Coventry City	128	(2)
Total		141	(2)
- * Club domestic league appearances and goals

James Lawrence (7 March 1891 – 1970) was an English footballer who played in the Football League for Aston Villa and Coventry City.
