= Norman Mackay =

Scottish footballer

Personal information
- Full name: Thomas Norman Mackay
- Date of birth: 26 May 1901
- Place of birth: Edinburgh, Scotland
- Date of death: 2 May 1965 (aged 63)
- Place of death: Edinburgh, Scotland
- Positions: Right half; inside right

Senior career*
| Years | Team | Apps | (Gls) |
| – | Edinburgh Royal | | |
| – | Broxburn United | | |
| 1920–1921 | Hibernian | 4 | (0) |
| 1921–1922 | Blackburn Rovers | 0 | (0) |
| 1923–1925 | Aston Villa | 2 | (0) |
| – | Lovell's Athletic | | |
| – | Yoker Athletic | | |
| 1927–1934 | Plymouth Argyle | 227 | (14) |
| 1934–1935 | Southend United | 32 | (0) |
| – | Clydebank Juniors | | |
- * Club domestic league appearances and goals

Thomas Norman Mackay (26 May 1901 – 2 May 1965) was a Scottish professional footballer who played in the Football League for Aston Villa, Plymouth Argyle and Southend United. He played as a right half or inside right.

Mackay was born in Edinburgh. He played for Edinburgh Royal and Broxburn United, and was on the books of Blackburn Rovers (without playing in the League) and Hibernian, before signing for Aston Villa in 1923. He made his Football League debut for Villa in the 1923–24 season, but appeared only twice for the club before moving on to Western League club Lovell's Athletic. He returned to his native Scotland where he played for Junior club Yoker Athletic and had a trial with Scottish League club Clydebank, then came back to England where he joined Plymouth Argyle. He went on to make 241 appearances for the club in all competitions, and was a regular choice for the first team for six seasons from 1928–29 onwards. His last appearance for the first team came in May 1934, after which he spent a season with Southend United before returning to Scotland where he joined Clydebank Juniors.
