= 1920 FA Cup final =

1920 FA Cup Final
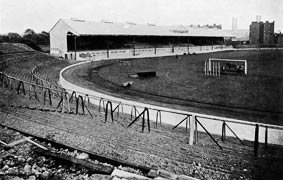
- Stamford Bridge hosted the match
- Event: 1919–20 FA Cup
Aston Villa	Huddersfield Town
1	0
- After extra time
- Date: 24 April 1920
- Venue: Stamford Bridge, London
- Referee: Jack Howcroft (Bolton)
- Attendance: 50,018

The 1920 FA Cup final, the first since the end of the First World War, was contested by Aston Villa and Huddersfield at Stamford Bridge. Aston Villa won 1–0, with the goal coming in extra time from Billy Kirton, to clinch the trophy for a record sixth time.

This was Aston Villa's sixth FA Cup Final win. Their opponents had secured promotion from the Second Division this season, having nearly gone out of business, and were appearing in their first final. Aston Villa captain, Andy Ducat, had represented England at both football and cricket. The Villa team had four surviving members of the club's last F.A. Cup final victory in 1913; Tommy Weston, Sam Hardy, Clem Stephenson and Charlie Wallace. Those four Villa players and Frank Moss had all served in the Armed Forces during World War I. Frank Barson, known for his tough style of play, was warned before the kick-off by the referee against using his normal tactics.

This was Villa manager George Ramsay's sixth FA Cup Final win, a record for a manager, and one that was only equalled in 2015 by Arsène Wenger – against Aston Villa. The trophy was presented by Prince Henry, the third son of King George V.

== Road to the Final ==
How the finalists reached the final. Huddersfield Town were in the Second Division at this time.

=== Aston Villa ===
Round 1	Aston Villa	2–1	Queens Park Rangers	QPR were a non-league club at this time.
Round 2	Manchester United	1–2	Aston Villa	
Round 3	Aston Villa	1–0	Sunderland	
Quarter-final	Tottenham Hotspur	0–1	Aston Villa	Tottenham Hotspur were in the Second Division at this time
Semi-final	Aston Villa	3–1	Chelsea	played at Bramall Lane, Sheffield

=== Huddersfield Town ===
Round 1	Huddersfield Town	2–1	Brentford	Brentford were a non-league club at this time.
Round 2	Newcastle United	0–1	Huddersfield Town	
Round 3	Huddersfield Town	3–1	Plymouth Argyle	Plymouth Argyle were a non-league club at this time.
Quarter-final	Huddersfield Town	2–1	Liverpool	
Semi-final	Huddersfield Town	2–1	Bristol City	played at Stamford Bridge, London

== Match details ==
24 April 1920
15:00 BST

Aston Villa	1–0 (a.e.t.)	Huddersfield Town
Kirton 100'	Report

Stamford Bridge, London
Attendance: 50,018
Referee: Jack Howcroft (Bolton)

Aston Villa	Huddersfield Town

GK	(England) Sam Hardy
RB	(England) Tommy Smart
LB	(England) Tommy Weston
RH	(England) Andy Ducat (c)
CH	(England) Frank Barson
LH	(England) Frank Moss
OR	(England) Charlie Wallace
IR	(England) Billy Kirton
CF	(England) Billy Walker
IL	(England) Clem Stephenson
OL	(England) Arthur Dorrell
Secretary-Manager:
(Scotland) George Ramsay

GK	(Scotland) Sandy Mutch
RB	(England) James Wood
LB	(England) Fred Bullock (c)
RH	(England) Charlie Slade
CH	(England) Tom Wilson
LH	(England) Billy Watson
OR	(England) George Richardson
IR	(England) Frank Mann
CF	(England) Sam Taylor
IL	(England) Jack Swann
OL	(England) Ernie Islip
Manager:
(England) Ambrose Langley
