= Cecil Harris (footballer, born 1896) =

English footballer

Personal information
- Full name: Cecil Vernon Harris
- Date of birth: 1 September 1896
- Place of birth: Grantham, England
- Date of death: 1976 (aged 79–80)
- Height: 5 ft 9 in (1.75 m)
- Position: Full-back

Senior career*
Years	Team	Apps	(Gls)
1920–1921	Grantham		
1921–1922	Llandrindod Wells		
1922–1926	Aston Villa	26	(0)
1926–1929	Grimsby Town	47	(1)
1929–19??	Gainsborough Trinity		
- * Club domestic league appearances and goals

Cecil Vernon Harris (1 September 1896 – 1976) was an English professional footballer who played as a full-back.
