= Thomas Mort =

English footballer

Tommy Mort
Personal information
- Full name: Thomas Mort
- Date of birth: 1 December 1897
- Place of birth: Kearsley, England
- Date of death: 6 June 1967 (aged 69)
- Place of death: Wigan, England
- Position: Full-back

Youth career
- Farnworth Council School

Senior career*
Years	Team	Apps	(Gls)
- Kearsley St. Stephens
- Newton Lads Club
- Lancashire Fusiliers (wartime)
- Altrincham
1921–1922	Rochdale	28	(0)
1922–1935	Aston Villa	337	(2)

International career
1924–1926	England	3	(0)
- * Club domestic league appearances and goals

Thomas Mort (1 December 1897 – 6 June 1967) was an English footballer who played club football primarily for Aston Villa, as a left-back. He also made three appearances for the England national team between 1924 and 1926.

Villa signed Tommy Mort from Rochdale for £1,000 in 1922 and along with Tommy Smart, was part of a defensive tandem known for Villa as "Death and Glory." He played 13 seasons with the club with 337 appearances.

He travelled with Villa on their first foreign tour im May. Örgryte celebrated a major success when beating Villa 5–2. Villa were defeated by Gothenburg-combined (Kombinerol Gotesburgslag) while the tourers won 11 - 2 over the select Oslo-combined Lyn og Frig including FK Lyn & Frigg Oslo players.

He was a cousin of Cardiff City defender Enoch Mort.

== Honours ==
Aston Villa

- FA Cup runner-up: 1923–24
