= Joe Davison (footballer, born 1897) =

English footballer

Personal information
- Full name: Joseph Davison
- Date of birth: 6 July 1897
- Place of birth: Byers Green, County Durham, England
- Date of death: 1965 (aged 67–68)
- Place of death: Hemel Hempstead, England
- Height: 5 ft 11 in (1.80 m)
- Position: Full back

Senior career*
Years	Team	Apps	(Gls)
1919–1923	Middlesbrough	7	(0)
1923–1927	Portsmouth	30	(0)
1927–1932	Watford	135	(2)
Total		172	(2)
- * Club domestic league appearances and goals

Joseph Davison (6 July 1897 – 1965) was an English professional footballer. He played as a full back in the Football League for Middlesbrough, Portsmouth and Watford.

Born in Byers Green, Davison started his working life doing national service, during and after the First World War. Once he was demobbed, he signed as a professional for Middlesbrough, where he remained for four years. He joined Portsmouth in 1923, and was appointed captain. In 1923–24, Davison's first season at the club, Portsmouth won promotion from the Third Division South as champions. In 1926–27, Portsmouth finished second in the Second Division, winning promotion to the First Division. However, Davison was released at the end of that season, and joined Watford on a free transfer. He made 147 appearances for Watford in all competitions, scoring two goals. He retired from football at the end of the 1931–32 season.
