= Tommy Smart =

English footballer

Personal information
- Full name: Thomas Smart
- Date of birth: 20 September 1896
- Place of birth: Blackheath, Staffordshire, England
- Date of death: 10 June 1968 (aged 71)
- Height: 6 ft 2 in (1.88 m)
- Position: Full back

Youth career
- Rowley Regis Schools

Senior career*
Years	Team	Apps	(Gls)
- Blackheath Town
19??–1920	Halesowen Town		
1920–1934	Aston Villa	405	(8)
1934–1936	Brierley Hill Alliance		

International career
1921–1929	England	5	(0)
- * Club domestic league appearances and goals

Thomas Smart (20 September 1896 – 10 June 1968) was an English footballer who played as a full back for Aston Villa. He made five appearances for England at international level, and also played for the Football League XI.

Tommy Smart was born in Blackheath, which was then in Staffordshire. He had four brothers and four sisters. He played schools football in the Rowley Regis area before joining Blackheath Town, and when his career was interrupted by the outbreak of the First World War, he played Army football. After the war, he played for Halesowen Town

Smart signied for Football League First Division club Aston Villa in January 1920 for a £300.00 fee. He soon established himself in Villa's first team, and made his debut for the England team against Scotland in 1921. The third of his five appearances, also against Scotland, was in the first match that England played at Wembley Stadium, on 12 April 1924.

Smart scored eight goals in 408 Football League matches for Villa, and played another 46 matches in the FA Cup, including appearances on the winning side in the 1920 FA Cup Final and on the losing side in 1924. Only six players have played more times for the club.

In 1934 he moved on to Brierley Hill Alliance, and retired from football in 1936. He died in 1968.

== Honours ==
Aston Villa

- FA Cup: 1919–20, runner-up: 1923–24
