= Billy Walker (footballer, born 1897) =

English footballer (1897–1964)

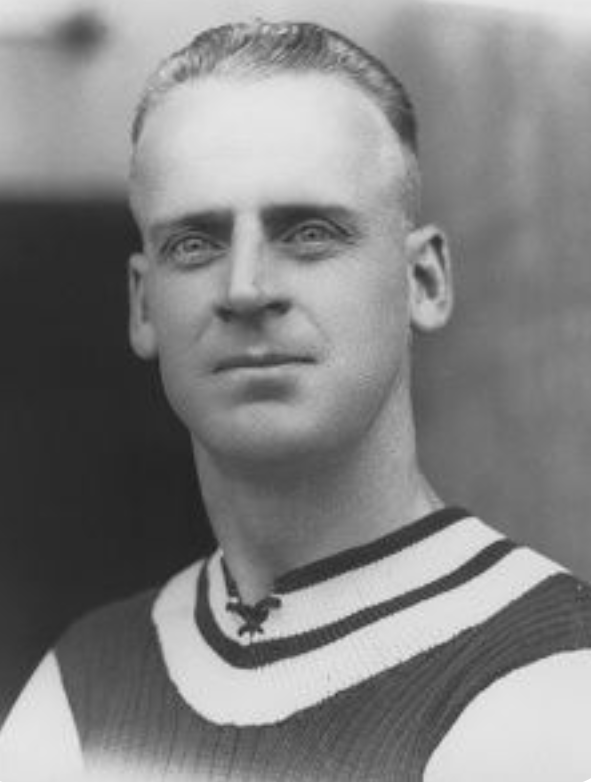
- Walker in 1925

Personal information
- Full name: William Henry Walker
- Date of birth: 29 October 1897
- Place of birth: Wednesbury, England
- Date of death: 28 November 1964 (aged 67)
- Place of death: Radcliffe-on-Trent, (Note: Although many modern reliable sources list Sheffield as Walker's place of death, contemporary newspaper reports confirm his death as having taken place in Nottingham. Most mention that he died in an unspecified Nottingham hospital, which his probate record names as Saxondale Hospital in nearby Radcliffe-on-Trent.) England
- Height: 6 ft 0 in (1.83 m)
- Position: Inside forward

Youth career
- 1915–1919: Aston Villa

Senior career*
Years	Team	Apps	(Gls)
1919–1933	Aston Villa	478	(214)

International career
1920–1932	England	18	(9)

Managerial career
- 1933–1937: Sheffield Wednesday
- 1938: Chelmsford City
- 1939–1960: Nottingham Forest
- * Club domestic league appearances and goals

William Henry Walker (29 October 1897 – 28 November 1964) was a prominent English footballer of the 1920s and 1930s. He is considered by many to be one of the greatest footballers to ever play for Aston Villa and England. As a manager he won the FA Cup with each of Sheffield Wednesday and Nottingham Forest, some 24 years apart, which remains the longest interval between FA cup wins as manager.

== Early life ==
Billy Walker was born in Wednesbury, Staffordshire. His father George Walker had played professional football for Wolverhampton Wanders and Crystal Palace. His teenage years saw him play for a number of football clubs at junior level, starting at Hednesford Town in 1912. He went onto play for Fallings Heath, Darlaston, Wednesbury Old Park and Wednesbury Old Athletic. In 1915 he was signed by Aston Villa on a part-time contract, signing professional forms after the first world war in May 1919.

== Playing career ==
Walker made his senior debut in January 1920 in the FA Cup, scoring twice as Aston Villa won 2–1 in the first round against non-league side Queens Park Rangers. He played in five more FA Cup games, scoring another three, helping Aston Villa reach the FA Cup Final, against second division Huddersfield Town. An extra time winner at Stamford Bridge by Billy Kirton saw Walker become an FA Cup winner in his debut season. Walker also scored 8 league goals in 15 matches at the back end of the 1919–20 season, including a hat-trick against Newcastle United, as Villa ended the first season after the first world war in ninth place.

On the opening day of the 1920–21 season he scored four goals as Villa beat Arsenal 5–0. In November 1921, Walker became the first player to score a hat-trick of penalty kicks in a First Division match, the second ever after William McAulay for Walsall in 1900, doing so in a 7–1 win against Bradford City. Walker is one of twelve players to score this rare hat-trick in a League game, only matched later in the top flight by Charlie Mitten (Man Utd, 1950), Ken Barnes (Man City, 1957). and Justin Kluivert (Bournemouth, 2024). Walker scored 26 goals that season, his best total in the league, and four in the FA Cup. He also scored over 20 league goals in each of the next two seasons.

The 1923–24 season saw Villa again reach the FA Cup final, Walker scoring three in six games, but they lost 2–0 to Newcastle United at Wembley. Walker scored 21 goals in the 1925–26 season, the fourth and final time scored over twenty League goals in a season. He became Aston Villa's captain in 1926 and, that year, sailed North to Sweden with Villa on their first foreign tour in May. Örgryte celebrated a major success when beating Aston Villa 5–2. Villa were defeated by Gothenburg-combined (Kombinerol Gotesburgslag). Villa won 11 - 2 over the select Oslo-combined Lyn og Frig including FK Lyn & Frigg Oslo players. Len Capewell scored four, Walker a hat-trick.

He led the team for five years before handing it over to Alec Talbot in 1931. He scored 10 in 1927–28 but the next season saw him net 19 times in 36 league appearances. The following season he failed to reach double figures, scoring only 8 times.

The 1930–31 season saw Walker come close to leading Aston Villa becoming English champions, finishing second in the league, scoring a record total of goals, but losing out to a tighter Arsenal defence. Villa scored 128 goals, Arsenal scored 127 but Villa conceded 78. Costly away defeats left the Villains seven points adrift of the Gunners. Walker contributed with 15 goals that season, adding to the 49 scored by Pongo Waring and Eric Houghton's 30. Walker again came close to a league title with Villa, again finishing second to Arsenal, this time by four points in 1932–33. Away form the difference again as Villa managed only twenty points and thirty two goals away from Villa Park, from their twenty one matches. That season was Walker's last full season; he had scored five goals in 30 league games. He played in five matches the next season before retiring in September 1933 and by December that year had become manager of Sheffield Wednesday.

A one-club man, Walker made 531 appearances for Villa, scoring 244 goals between 1920 and 1934. He scored 214 goals in 478 matches in the league, that ranks him 17th in the all time top flight league scorers in England. He finished his league career only a goal behind Harry Hampton (215), but he is Aston Villa's all-time top goalscorer, beating Hampton's 242.

Walker was capped 18 times by England, scoring nine goals. He scored on his debut as England beat Ireland 2–0 at Roker Park, Sunderland in October 1920. He has the distinction of scoring England's first ever goal at Wembley. Scotland were the first visitors for an international match at Wembley on 12 April 1924, and led at half-time through a Ted Taylor own goal, before Walker equalised after an hour for a 1–1 draw. Five of his goals came in the British Home Championship, with two braces in friendly matches making up his tally. In the friendly against Belgium in December 1924 at The Hawthorns, Walker missed a penalty after fifteen minutes, but scored twice in the second half. His final cap came nearly six years after earning his 17th, when he was made captain for a friendly in December 1932, against Austria which England won 4–3. He became the second Aston Villa player to captain England, after Howard Spencer.

Billy Walker was Villa's talisman throughout the 1920s and into the 1930s, netting double figures in 12 consecutive seasons from 1919–20. Full-back Tommy Smart is said to have once been asked: "What's the team for the match, Tommy?". "Oh, Billy Walker and ten others!" was the reply.

In March 2003, nearly 40 years after his death, he was named by BBC Sport as the former player Aston Villa needed in their modern-day team – who were struggling for goals that season and narrowly avoided relegation from the FA Premier League.

== Managerial career ==
=== Sheffield Wednesday ===
Walker became manager of Sheffield Wednesday in December 1933, and he successfully steered them away from relegation. In 1935 he led them to an FA Cup victory, but Wednesday were relegated two years later and Walker resigned in November 1937.

=== Chelmsford City ===
On 24 January 1938, Walker was appointed secretary-manager of newly formed club Chelmsford City. Walker's first signings as Chelmsford manager included former England international Eric Keen, Ireland international Jackie Coulter and Jack Palethorpe, whom he had managed at Sheffield Wednesday. On 20 October 1938, Walker resigned from Chelmsford due to conflict with Chelmsford's directors over transfers. Walker had intended to sign a player from Plymouth Argyle for free, before discovering a £500 fee was demanded, believing "that money was going to take a lot of finding" from the club.

=== Nottingham Forest ===
Walker managed Nottingham Forest from 1939 to 1960, bringing promotion to the First Division in 1956–57 and an FA Cup final triumph two years later, beating former team Aston Villa in the semi-finals and becoming the only manager to win the trophy both before and after the Second World War. He retired in 1960.

== Death ==
Walker died on 28 November 1964 in Saxondale Hospital, Radcliffe-on-Trent, near Nottingham, after a long illness. Another former Sheffield Wednesday manager, Jimmy McMullan, died on the same day.

== Playing statistics ==
Appearances and goals by club, season and competition
Club	Season	League		FA Cup		Total	
Club	Season	Apps	Goals	Apps	Goals	Apps	Goals
Aston Villa	1919–20	15	8	6	5	21	13
Aston Villa	1920–21	37	26	5	4	42	30
Aston Villa	1921–22	36	21	6	6	42	27
Aston Villa	1922–23	40	23	1	0	41	23
Aston Villa	1923–24	36	14	6	3	42	17
Aston Villa	1924–25	35	19	4	6	39	25
Aston Villa	1925–26	36	21	4	1	40	22
Aston Villa	1926–27	33	16	1	0	34	16
Aston Villa	1927–28	38	10	3	1	41	11
Aston Villa	1928–29	36	19	5	0	41	19
Aston Villa	1929–30	31	8	4	3	35	11
Aston Villa	1930–31	42	15	2	1	44	16
Aston Villa	1931–32	28	9	3	0	31	9
Aston Villa	1932–33	30	5	3	0	33	5
Aston Villa	1933–34	5	0	0	0	5	0
Career total		478	214	53	30	531	244

== Managerial statistics ==
Team	From	To	Record				
Team	From	To	G	W	D	L	Win %
Sheffield Wednesday	December 1933	November 1937	187	66	68	53	35.29
Nottingham Forest	1 May 1939	1 August 1960	864	344	191	329	39.81
Total			1,051	410	259	382	39.01

== Honours ==
=== Player ===
Aston Villa

- FA Cup: 1919–20; runner-up: 1923–24

=== Manager ===
Sheffield Wednesday

- FA Cup: 1934–35
- FA Charity Shield: 1935

Nottingham Forest

- FA Cup: 1958–59
- Football League Third Division South: 1950–51
- Football League Second Division runner-up: 1956–57
