= Len Capewell =

English footballer

Personal information
- Full name: Leonard King Capewell
- Date of birth: 8 June 1895
- Date of death: September 1978
- Position: Forward

Senior career*
Years	Team	Apps	(Gls)
- Bordesley Green
- Washwood Heath Council Schools
- Saltley Baptists
- Wolseley Athletic Works
- Wellington Town
- Aston Villa
- Walsall
- * Club domestic league appearances and goals

Leonard King Capewell (8 June 1895 – September 1978) was an English professional footballer whose played as a forward. Capewell is best known for his time with Aston Villa. While at Villa, Capewell played 156 games scoring 100 goals nd served with the Royal Engineers in Belgium during World War I.

Before playing for Villa he played for Wellington Town and also had spells with Bordesley Green, Washwood Heath Council Schools, Saltley Baptists and Wolseley Athletic Works FC.

In 1926, he travelled to Sweden with Villa on their first foreign tour in May. Örgryte celebrated a major success when beating Aston Villa 5–2. Villa were defeated by Gothenburg-combined (Kombinerol Gotesburgslag). Villa won 11 - 2 over the select Oslo-combined Lyn og Frig including FK Lyn & Frigg Oslo players. Capewell scored four.

Capewell left Villa for Walsall in February 1930.

== Honours ==
Aston Villa

- FA Cup runner-up: 1923–24
