= Frederick Rinder =

British architect, surveyor & football administrator (1858-1938)

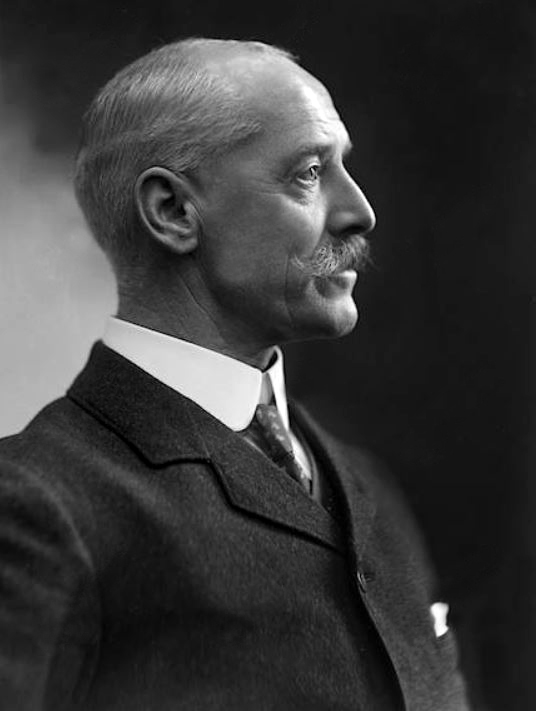

Chairman of Aston Villa F.C.
- In office 1898–1925
- Preceded by: J. E. Margoschis
- Succeeded by: J. E. Jones

Personal details
- Born: July 1858 Liverpool, England
- Died: 25 December 1938 (aged 80) Birmingham, England
- Spouse: Eliza (nee Brockhurst)
- Children: 2
- Occupation: Architect and Surveyor, Director of Aston Villa, Senior Vice-President of the Football League

Frederick William Rinder (July 1858, Liverpool – 25 December 1938, Harborne, Birmingham) was a committee member and later influential chairman of Aston Villa F.C. during the club's 'Golden Age'. During Rinder's time as chairman, a period of 27 years, the Villa established themselves as the most successful football club in England winning no fewer than 6 League Championships and 5 FA Cups.

He was largely responsible for the design and development of Villa Park.

== Early life ==
Rinder was born in Liverpool, but the family moved to Leeds when he was a child. He was the second son of John and Elizabeth Rinder, his father ran a street paving contracting business.

He married a Birmingham girl, Eliza Brockhurst in 1886, they had two daughters, Muriel and Ivy.

== Career ==
=== Financial Secretary ===
Rinder arrived in Birmingham in 1876 at the age of 18 and became a member of the club in 1881. He first came to the fore in 1887 when Villa built the Grand Stand at Perry Barr, as he was by trade a surveyor for the Birmingham City Corporation and his expertise and contacts proved invaluable to the club. He became the club's financial secretary in 1892, and set about installing turnstiles at Villa's Perry Barr ground. Gate receipts immediately increased from £75 to £250.

Despite Villa founding the league in 1888, by 1893 they had yet to win it. Rinder was not satisfied with the way the club was being run, which culminated in him instigating the Barwick Street meeting in February 1893. At the meeting he made a decisive speech attacking the men who he deemed to be mismanaging the football club, criticising the board's tolerance of ill discipline and players' drinking. Subsequently, all fourteen members of the committee resigned and were replaced by a committee of five led by Rinder. The following season saw Villa win their first League Championship, the season after that the club won its second FA Cup.

Villa's home ground, Wellington Road, faced increasing problems including an uneven pitch, poor spectator facilities, a lack of access and exorbitant rents. As a result, in 1894 Villa's committee, led by Rinder began negotiations with the owners of the Aston Lower Grounds, "the finest sports ground in the district."

=== Chairman ===
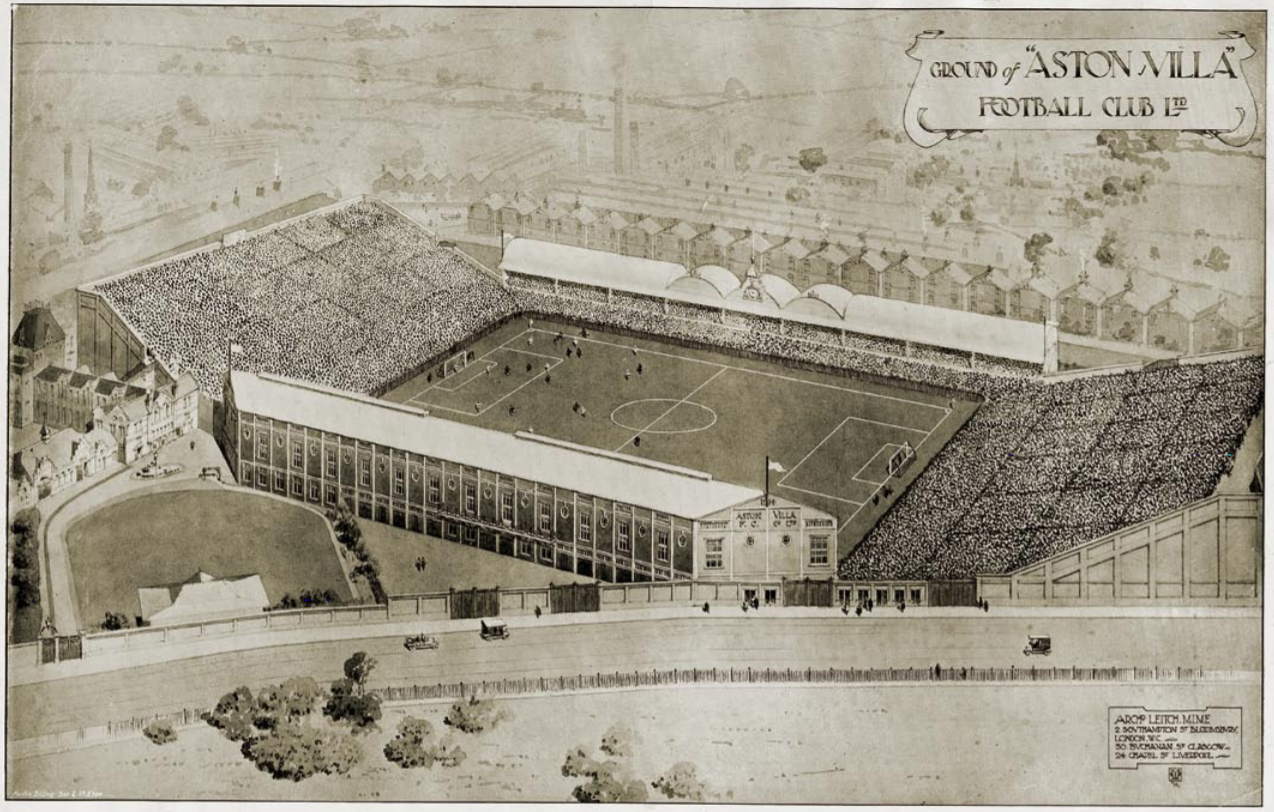
Fred Rinder's plans for Villa Park in 1914 would have extended the ground capacity to 120,000.

Rinder became chairman in 1898, demanding high standards of discipline and dedication from the players, while investing in the club's facilities. The grand Byzantine-style red brick buildings the club had inherited when it moved into the Aston Lower Grounds were converted into club offices, with a gymnasium, steam rooms, an X-ray machine, billiard hall and recreation room, designed to keep the players out of the pubs.

Once on a train returning from a Villa away match, the team compartment had filled up with hangers-on, forcing the players to stand up. As soon as he saw this, Rinder cleared the carriage and threw three bottles of whisky out of the train window. 'There were plenty of black looks' he remembered. 'A reformer is rarely popular.'

During Rinder's time as chairman at the helm the Villa established themselves as the most successful football club in England winning no fewer than 6 League Championships and 5 FA Cups. In his capacity as chairman Rinder assisted Villa Secretary George Ramsay in the acquisition of new players including club greats such as Steve Smith and Billy George. In the case of Steve Smith, Rinder travelled to a Hednesford coal mine to sign him, eventually making contact hundreds of feet below the surface while Smith was working a night shift. Having signed the player in the engine-house, Rinder then lost his way in the dark and after hours of wandering around coal tips and canal sides, he ended up creeping into the cabin of a longboat for an uncomfortable night.

Simon Inglis gives much of the credit for the design of Villa Park to Frederick Rinder, who as a trained surveyor, is said to have laid down every 'level and line' of the ground himself before construction began. He had visualised its eventual appearance from a number of sketches he had made and passed on to well-established architects of the day, E.B. Holmes and later Archibald Leitch. Detailed plans were drawn up in 1914 for the development of the ground to hold 120,000 people, but World War One meant that the plan was only partly realised after the war, with the Trinity Road stand being opened to the public in 1923. The Oak Room in the Trinity Road stand was the first restaurant at a British football ground.

=== Resignation ===
He led the club with an iron will until his resignation in 1925, when he stepped down largely due to the criticism he received for the cost of the new Trinity Road Stand, which had spiralled to nearly £65,000 (at a time when the country's costliest player cost £5,000). However, Rinder's view was that nothing but the very best was good enough for Aston Villa with its stained glass, Italian mosaics and grand frontage. He said:

"Finance is important, but we should never forget that we are not talking about a mere business. This is the Aston Villa football club, and it deserves nothing short of the best".

== Later life ==
=== Football League & Football Association ===
Fred Rinder in his capacity with the FA, was responsible for the innovation of singing the hymn "Abide With Me" at the 1927 FA Cup Final. It has been a traditional feature of cup finals ever since.

He was elected to the Management Committee of the Football League in 1917, a position he held until 1930 when he was appointed as Senior Vice-president of the Football League. He held a seat on the Council of the FA from 1929. He was appointed to the FA International Selection Committee in 1931.

Rinder was the longest surviving participant of the original League gathering of March 1888. Having witnessed the birth of the Football League, he missed only one of the next fifty Annual Meetings. He was awarded a Long Service Medal from the Football League in 1938.

=== Return to Aston Villa F.C. ===
Following Aston Villa's first relegation in 1936, the 78-year-old Rinder was brought back after an 11-year absence. On his return he was vocal in his criticism of the board for its "almost total neglect of the reserve team, instead relying on paying big fees for ready made players". He believed that this change in policy from scouting and developing young homegrown talent led to a decline in the club's culture and style of play, which alongside the management's tolerance of dissension from the players led to Villa's relegation. He said:

"Villa have been a great club, are still a great club, and always will be a great club".

His first act was to introduce a coach whom he met whilst on FA duty at the 1936 Berlin Olympics, Jimmy Hogan, who led Villa to the Second Division championship in 1937/38.

== Death ==
Rinder was taken ill on returning home from watching a mid-week reserve team match between Aston Villa and Leicester City. He died a week later on Christmas Day 1938 at the age of 80.
