= 1919–20 FA Cup =

Tournament details
- Country: England; Wales

Final positions
- Champions: Aston Villa (6th title)
- Runners-up: Huddersfield Town

The 1919–20 FA Cup was the 45th season of the world's oldest association football competition, the Football Association Challenge Cup (more usually known as the FA Cup), and the first since the cancellation of all football competitions due to the First World War. Aston Villa won the competition, beating Huddersfield Town 1–0 in the final at Stamford Bridge, London.

Matches were scheduled to be played at the stadium of the team named first on the date specified for each round, which was always a Saturday. If scores were level after 90 minutes had been played, a replay would take place at the stadium of the second-named team later the same week. If the replayed match was drawn further replays would be held at neutral venues until a winner was determined. If scores were level after 90 minutes had been played in a replay, a 30-minute period of extra time would be played.

== Calendar ==
The format of the FA Cup for the season had two preliminary rounds, six qualifying rounds, four proper rounds, and the semi-finals and final.

Round	Date
Extra preliminary round	Saturday 13 September 1919
Preliminary round	Saturday 27 September 1919
First round qualifying	Saturday 11 October 1919
Second round qualifying	Saturday 25 October 1919
Third round qualifying	Saturday 8 November 1919
Fourth round qualifying	Saturday 22 November 1919
Fifth round qualifying	Saturday 6 December 1919
Sixth round qualifying	Saturday 20 December 1919
First round proper	Saturday 10 January 1920
Second round proper	Saturday 31 January 1920
Third round proper	Saturday 21 February 1920
Fourth round proper	Saturday 6 March 1920
Semi-finals	Saturday 27 March 1920
Final	Saturday 24 April 1920

== Qualifying rounds ==
Participant numbers were down on previous editions of the tournament after many clubs from the lower levels of the English football pyramid (such as it was at the time) did not resume operations after the First World War. Local leagues across the country were hit hard by the heavy loss of players during the years of conflict, while other clubs such as Croydon Common from competitions as strong as the Southern League First Division were wound up after their income streams disappeared during the four-season long competitive hiatus.

In the end, the 12 winners from the sixth qualifying round were Football League Second Division side Port Vale and non-league teams Luton Town, West Stanley, Castleford Town, Thornycrofts (Woolston), Darlington, Southend United, Gillingham, Hednesford Town, Bristol Rovers, Rochdale and Newport County. Port Vale had actually begun the season in the Central League, but had been re-instated to the Football League after eight rounds following the involuntary liquidation of Leeds City in the wake of an illegal player payments scandal. Those qualifying for the first round proper for the first time were West Stanley, Newport County and - more significantly - Thornycrofts (Woolston),Hednesford Town and Castleford Town.

Thornycrofts, Hednesford and Castleford were the first clubs in Cup history to participate in nine rounds of an individual tournament. Hednesford and Thornycrofts progressed from the extra preliminary round to the first round proper, while Castleford commenced in the preliminary round and progressed through to the second round proper. Hednesford Town overcame Halesowen, Atherstone Town, Willenhall, Cradley Heath, Darlaston, Shrewsbury Town, Walsall and East London works outfit Gnome Athletic before bowing out in the first round to Castleford at Wheldon Road, while Thornycrofts (Woolston) saw off RAE Farnborough, Bournemouth Gasworks, Cowes, Basingstoke Town, Bournemouth Tramways, Oxford City, Dulwich Hamlet and Sheppey United before famously taking Burnley to a replay at Turf Moor after a scoreless draw in the initial match at Fratton Park. Castleford defeated Calverley, Halifax Town, Leeds Steel Works, South Kirkby Colliery, Lintz Institute, Cleethorpes Town, London Caledonians and Hednesford before going out to Bradford Park Avenue.

For all qualifying round results see 1919–20 FA Cup qualifying rounds.

== First round proper ==
42 of the 44 clubs from the First and Second divisions joined the 12 clubs who came through the qualifying rounds. The other two sides, Port Vale and Rotherham County, were entered in the sixth qualifying round with Port Vale progressing and Rotherham going out to West Stanley.

Ten non-league sides were given byes to the first round to bring the total number of teams up to 64. These were:

- Southampton
- Millwall
- Queens Park Rangers
- Crystal Palace
- Swindon Town
- Plymouth Argyle
- Reading
- Portsmouth
- Brentford
- Cardiff City

32 matches were scheduled to be played on Saturday, 10 January 1920. Eight matches were drawn and went to replays in the following midweek fixture.

Tie no	Home team	Score	Away team	Date
1	Birmingham	2–0	Everton	10 January 1920
2	Blackpool	0–0	Derby County	10 January 1920
Replay	Derby County	1–4	Blackpool	14 January 1920
3	Darlington	0–0	The Wednesday	14 January 1920
Replay	The Wednesday	0–2	Darlington	19 January 1920
4	Bury	2–0	Stoke	10 January 1920
5	Preston North End	3–1	Stockport County	10 January 1920
6	South Shields	1–1	Liverpool	10 January 1920
Replay	Liverpool	2–0	South Shields	14 January 1920
7	Southampton	0–0	West Ham United	10 January 1920
Replay	West Ham United	3–1	Southampton	15 January 1920
8	Notts County	2–0	Millwall	10 January 1920
9	Blackburn Rovers	2–2	Wolverhampton Wanderers	10 January 1920
Replay	Wolverhampton Wanderers	1–0	Blackburn Rovers	15 January 1920
10	Aston Villa	2–1	Queens Park Rangers	10 January 1920
11	Bolton Wanderers	0–1	Chelsea	10 January 1920
12	Grimsby Town	1–2	Bristol City	10 January 1920
13	Middlesbrough	4–1	Lincoln City	14 January 1920
14	West Bromwich Albion	0–1	Barnsley	10 January 1920
15	Sunderland	6–2	Hull City	14 January 1920
16	Luton Town	2–2	Coventry City	10 January 1920
Replay	Coventry City	0–1	Luton Town	15 January 1920
17	Sheffield United	3–0	Southend United	10 January 1920
18	Newcastle United	2–0	Crystal Palace	10 January 1920
19	Manchester City	4–1	Clapton Orient	10 January 1920
20	Fulham	1–2	Swindon Town	10 January 1920
21	Bristol Rovers	1–4	Tottenham Hotspur	10 January 1920
22	Plymouth Argyle	2–0	Reading	10 January 1920
23	Bradford City	2–0	Portsmouth	17 January 1920
24	West Stanley	3–1	Gillingham	17 January 1920
25	Castleford Town	2–0	Hednesford Town	10 January 1920
26	Bradford Park Avenue	3–0	Nottingham Forest	10 January 1920
27	Huddersfield Town	5–1	Brentford	10 January 1920
28	Cardiff City	2–0	Oldham Athletic	10 January 1920
29	Port Vale	0–1	Manchester United	10 January 1920
30	Newport County	0–0	Leicester City	10 January 1920
Replay	Leicester City	2–0	Newport County	15 January 1920
31	Arsenal	4–2	Rochdale	10 January 1920
32	Thornycrofts (Woolston)	0–0	Burnley	10 January 1920
Replay	Burnley	5–0	Thornycrofts (Woolston)	13 January 1920

== Second round proper ==
The 16 Second Round matches were played on Saturday, 31 January 1920. One match was drawn, with the replay taking place in the following midweek fixture.

Tie no	Home team	Score	Away team	Date
1	Birmingham	4–0	Darlington	31 January 1920
2	Bristol City	1–0	Arsenal	31 January 1920
3	Burnley	1–1	Sunderland	31 January 1920
Replay	Sunderland	2–0	Burnley	4 February 1920
4	Preston North End	2–1	Blackpool	31 January 1920
5	Leicester City	3–0	Manchester City	31 January 1920
6	Notts County	1–0	Middlesbrough	31 January 1920
7	Wolverhampton Wanderers	1–2	Cardiff City	31 January 1920
8	Luton Town	0–2	Liverpool	31 January 1920
9	Newcastle United	0–1	Huddersfield Town	31 January 1920
10	Tottenham Hotspur	4–0	West Stanley	31 January 1920
11	West Ham United	6–0	Bury	31 January 1920
12	Manchester United	1–2	Aston Villa	31 January 1920
13	Plymouth Argyle	4–1	Barnsley	31 January 1920
14	Bradford City	2–1	Sheffield United	31 January 1920
15	Chelsea	4–0	Swindon Town	31 January 1920
16	Bradford Park Avenue	3–2	Castleford Town	31 January 1920

== Third round proper ==
The eight Third Round matches were scheduled for Saturday, 21 February 1920. There were no replays.

Tie no	Home team	Score	Away team	Date
1	Bristol City	2–1	Cardiff City	21 February 1920
2	Liverpool	2–0	Birmingham	21 February 1920
3	Preston North End	0–3	Bradford City	21 February 1920
4	Notts County	3–4	Bradford Park Avenue	21 February 1920
5	Aston Villa	1–0	Sunderland	21 February 1920
6	Tottenham Hotspur	3–0	West Ham United	21 February 1920
7	Chelsea	3–0	Leicester City	21 February 1920
8	Huddersfield Town	3–1	Plymouth Argyle	21 February 1920

== Fourth round proper ==
The four Fourth round matches were scheduled for Saturday, 6 March 1920. There were no replays.

Tie no	Home team	Score	Away team	Date
1	Bristol City	2–0	Bradford City	6 March 1920
2	Tottenham Hotspur	0–1	Aston Villa	6 March 1920
3	Chelsea	4–1	Bradford Park Avenue	6 March 1920
4	Huddersfield Town	2–1	Liverpool	6 March 1920

== Semi-finals ==
The semi-final matches were played on Saturday, 27 March 1920. Aston Villa and Huddersfield Town won and went on to meet in the final.

27 March 1920
15:00

Aston Villa	3–1	Chelsea

Bramall Lane, Sheffield

27 March 1920
15:00

Huddersfield Town	2–1	Bristol City

Stamford Bridge, London

== Final ==
The Final, the first since the end of the First World War, was contested by Aston Villa and Huddersfield at Stamford Bridge. Aston Villa won 1–0, with the goal coming in extra time from Billy Kirton.

=== Match details ===
24 April 1920
15:00 BST

Aston Villa	1–0 (a.e.t.)	Huddersfield Town
Kirton 100'

Stamford Bridge, London
Attendance: 50,018
Referee: Jack Howcroft

Aston Villa	Huddersfield Town

== See also ==
- FA Cup Final
