= Billy Kirton =

English footballer

Personal information
- Full name: William John Kirton
- Date of birth: 2 December 1895
- Place of birth: Cradley Heath, England
- Date of death: 27 September 1970 (aged 74)
- Place of death: Sutton Coldfield, England
- Position: Inside forward

Senior career*
Years	Team	Apps	(Gls)
- Pandon Temperance
1919	Leeds City	1	(0)
1919–1928	Aston Villa	261	(59)
1928–1929	Coventry City	16	(0)
- Kidderminster Harriers

International career
1921	England	1	(1)
- * Club domestic league appearances and goals

William John Kirton (2 December 1895 – 27 September 1970) was a footballer in the early years of professional football in England, who played over 200 games for Aston Villa and is best known for scoring the only goal in the 1920 FA Cup Final.

== Career ==
Kirton was born in Cradley Heath. He was a member of the Temperance Society and played for Pandon Temperance before joining Leeds City in May 1919. After Kirton had played only one game for the club, City went out of business and he was transferred to Aston Villa for £500 in October 1919.

He played 261 matches for Aston Villa. He travelled to Sweden with Villa on their first foreign tour.

In the 1919–20 season Aston Villa enjoyed a successful run in the FA Cup beating QPR (2-1), Manchester United (2-1), Sunderland (1-0), Tottenham Hotspur (1-0) and Chelsea (3-1).

Aston Villa played Huddersfield Town in the final at Stamford Bridge. Kirton scored the only goal of the game and Villa won the cup for the sixth time in its history.

Kirton, a talented inside-forward, formed a productive partnership with Clem Stephenson. He scored 59 goals in 261 appearances before signing for Coventry City in September 1928. However, he failed to score for his new club in 16 games and left to join Kidderminster Harriers.

Kirton won his first and only international cap for England against Northern Ireland on 22 October 1921, scoring England's only goal in a 1–1 draw. After retiring from professional football, Kirton ran a newsagent's shop in Great Barr, Birmingham.

A teetotaller and non-smoker, Kirton died in Sutton Coldfield on 27 September 1970.

== Honours ==
Aston Villa

- FA Cup: 1919–20; runner-up: 1923–24
