= List of Scottish football champions =

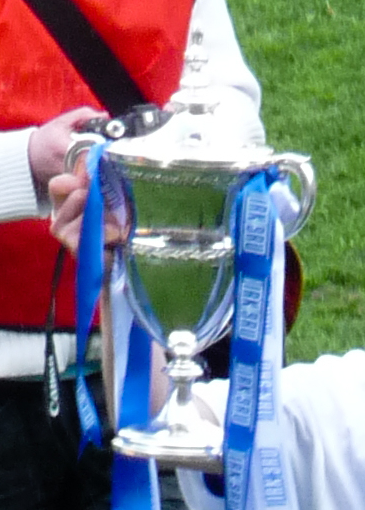
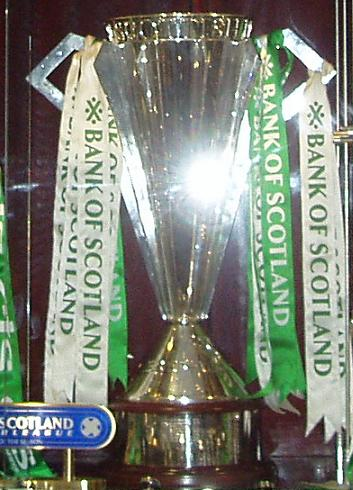
- The trophies awarded to the Scottish champions prior to 1998 (top) and subsequently (bottom)
- Founded: 1890 (Scottish Football League); 1998 (Scottish Premier League); 2013 (Scottish Premiership)
- Number of clubs: 12
- Current champions: Celtic (56th title) (2025–26)
- Most championships: Celtic (56 titles)
- Current: 2026–27 Scottish Premiership

The Scottish football champions are the winners of the highest league in Scottish football, namely the Scottish Football League (SFL) from 1890 until 1998, the Scottish Premier League (SPL) from 1998 until 2013 and the Scottish Premiership thereafter.

The SFL was established in 1890, initially as an amateur league until professionalism in Scottish football was legalised in 1893. At the end of the first season, Dumbarton and Rangers finished level on points at the top of the table. The rules in force at the time required that the teams contest a play-off match for the championship, which finished in a 2–2 draw, and the first ever championship was thus shared between two clubs, the only occasion on which this has happened. In 1893, a lower division was formed, with the existing division renamed Division One. The higher tier continued during World War I but the league was suspended altogether during World War II.

Although there were several short spells when a third level was created, the two-division structure remained largely in place until 1975, when a major re-organisation of the league led to a new three-tier setup and the creation of a new Premier Division at the highest level. In 1998, the teams then in the Premier Division broke away to form the SPL, which supplanted the Premier Division as the highest level of football in Scotland. The SPL and SFL merged in 2013 to form the Scottish Professional Football League (SPFL), which branded its top division as the Scottish Premiership.

Throughout its existence the championship of Scottish football has been dominated by two Glasgow clubs, Celtic and Rangers. The two rivals, who are collectively known as the "Old Firm", have claimed the vast majority of league titles and there have only been five seasons in which neither finished in the top two, most recently in the 1964–65 season. As of 2026, Celtic have won 56 titles and Rangers 55, while no other club has won on more than four occasions. No club outside the Old Firm has won the title since the 1984–85 season, when Aberdeen won the Premier Division under the management of Alex Ferguson. The current 41-year period of dominance by the Old Firm is a record; the previous longest streak was 27 years, between 1904 and 1931. Each of the Old Firm clubs has managed a run of nine consecutive championships: Celtic from 1966 to 1974 and again from 2012 to 2020, and Rangers from 1989 to 1997.

Both of the Old Firm clubs have also claimed the double, by winning the league and the Scottish Cup in the same season, on many occasions. As of the end of the 2025–26 season, Celtic have won 22 doubles and Rangers 18. The only other club to have won a league and Scottish Cup double is Aberdeen, in 1983–84. Both Old Firm clubs have completed a treble (Celtic 8 times; Rangers 7) by also winning the Scottish League Cup. In the 1966–67 season, Celtic took all three domestic trophies, and also won the European Cup to complete the only quadruple to date.

== Champions ==
Key:

Club won the Scottish Cup
Club won the Scottish League Cup
Club won both domestic cups

=== Scottish Football League (1890–1893) ===
Season	Champions	Runners-up	Third place	Top scorer(s)	
Season	Champions	Runners-up	Third place	Player(s)	Goals
1890–91	Dumbarton (1) and Rangers (1) (Note: Rangers and Dumbarton were declared joint champions after the teams finished level on points and a play-off for the title finished in a 2–2 draw.)		Celtic	Jack Bell (Dumbarton)	20
1891–92	Dumbarton (2)	Celtic	Heart of Midlothian	Jack Bell (Dumbarton)	23
1892–93	Celtic (1)	Rangers	St Mirren	Sandy McMahon (Celtic); John Campbell (Celtic)	11

=== Scottish Football League Division One (1893–1946) ===
Season	Champions	Runners-up	Third place	Top scorer(s)	
Season	Champions	Runners-up	Third place	Player(s)	Goals
1893–94	Celtic (2)	Heart of Midlothian	St Bernard's	Sandy McMahon (Celtic)	16
1894–95	Heart of Midlothian (1)	Celtic	Rangers	John Miller (Clyde)	12
1895–96	Celtic (3)	Rangers	Hibernian	Allan Martin (Celtic)	19
1896–97	Heart of Midlothian (2)	Hibernian	Rangers	Willie Taylor (Heart of Midlothian)	12
1897–98	Celtic (4)	Rangers	Hibernian	Robert Hamilton (Rangers)	18
1898–99	Rangers (2)	Heart of Midlothian	Celtic	Robert Hamilton (Rangers)	25
1899–1900	Rangers (3)	Celtic	Hibernian	Robert Hamilton (Rangers); William Michael (Heart of Midlothian)	15
1900–01	Rangers (4)	Celtic	Hibernian	Robert Hamilton (Rangers)	20
1901–02	Rangers (5)	Celtic	Heart of Midlothian	William Maxwell (Third Lanark)	10
1902–03	Hibernian (1)	Dundee	Rangers	David Reid (Hibernian)	14
1903–04	Third Lanark (1)	Heart of Midlothian	Celtic and Rangers	Robert Hamilton (Rangers)	28
1904–05	Celtic (5) (Note: Celtic defeated Rangers 2–1 in a play-off for the title after the teams finished level on points.)	Rangers	Third Lanark	Robert Hamilton (Rangers); Jimmy Quinn (Celtic)	19
1905–06	Celtic (6)	Heart of Midlothian	Airdrieonians	Jimmy Quinn (Celtic)	20
1906–07	Celtic (7)	Dundee	Rangers	Jimmy Quinn (Celtic)	29
1907–08	Celtic (8)	Falkirk	Rangers	Jock Simpson (Falkirk)	32
1908–09	Celtic (9)	Dundee	Clyde	John Hunter (Dundee)	29
1909–10	Celtic (10)	Falkirk	Rangers	Jimmy Quinn (Celtic); Jock Simpson (Falkirk)	24
1910–11	Rangers (6)	Aberdeen	Falkirk	Willie Reid (Rangers)	38
1911–12	Rangers (7)	Celtic	Clyde	Willie Reid (Rangers)	33
1912–13	Rangers (8)	Celtic	Airdrieonians and Heart of Midlothian	James Reid (Airdrieonians)	30
1913–14	Celtic (11)	Rangers	Heart of Midlothian and Morton	James Reid (Airdrieonians)	27
1914–15	Celtic (12)	Heart of Midlothian	Rangers	Tom Gracie (Heart of Midlothian); James Richardson (Ayr United)	29
1915–16	Celtic (13)	Rangers	Morton	Jimmy McColl (Celtic)	34
1916–17	Celtic (14)	Morton	Rangers	Bert Yarnall (Airdrieonians)	39
1917–18	Rangers (9)	Celtic	Kilmarnock and Morton	Hughie Ferguson (Motherwell)	35
1918–19	Celtic (15)	Rangers	Morton	David McLean (Rangers)	29
1919–20	Rangers (10)	Celtic	Motherwell	Hughie Ferguson (Motherwell)	33
1920–21	Rangers (11)	Celtic	Heart of Midlothian	Hughie Ferguson (Motherwell)	43
1921–22	Celtic (16)	Rangers	Raith Rovers	Duncan Walker (St Mirren)	45
1922–23	Rangers (12)	Airdrieonians	Celtic	Jock White (Heart of Midlothian)	30
1923–24	Rangers (13)	Airdrieonians	Celtic	Dave Halliday (Dundee)	38
1924–25	Rangers (14)	Airdrieonians	Hibernian	William Devlin (Cowdenbeath)	33
1925–26	Celtic (17)	Airdrieonians	Heart of Midlothian	William Devlin (Cowdenbeath)	40
1926–27	Rangers (15)	Motherwell	Celtic	Jimmy McGrory (Celtic)	49
1927–28	Rangers (16)	Celtic	Motherwell	Jimmy McGrory (Celtic)	47
1928–29	Rangers (17)	Celtic	Motherwell	Evelyn Morrison (Falkirk)	43
1929–30	Rangers (18)	Motherwell	Aberdeen	Benny Yorston (Aberdeen)	38
1930–31	Rangers (19)	Celtic	Motherwell	Barney Battles, Jr. (Heart of Midlothian)	44
1931–32	Motherwell (1)	Rangers	Celtic	Willie MacFadyen (Motherwell)	52
1932–33	Rangers (20)	Motherwell	Heart of Midlothian	Willie MacFadyen (Motherwell)	45
1933–34	Rangers (21)	Motherwell	Celtic	Jimmy Smith (Rangers)	41
1934–35	Rangers (22)	Celtic	Heart of Midlothian	Jimmy Smith (Rangers)	36
1935–36	Celtic (18)	Rangers	Aberdeen	Jimmy McGrory (Celtic)	50
1936–37	Rangers (23)	Aberdeen	Celtic	David Wilson (Hamilton Academical)	34
1937–38	Celtic (19)	Heart of Midlothian	Rangers	Andy Black (Heart of Midlothian)	40
1938–39	Rangers (24)	Celtic	Aberdeen	Alex Venters (Rangers)	35
1939–46	Suspended due to World War II. Unofficial leagues (Emergency League and regional North Eastern League and Southern League) held.				

=== Scottish Football League Division 'A' (1946–1955) ===
Season	Champions	Runners-up	Third place	Top scorer(s)	
Season	Champions	Runners-up	Third place	Player(s)	Goals
1946–47	Rangers (25)	Hibernian	Aberdeen	Bobby Mitchell (Third Lanark)	22
1947–48	Hibernian (2)	Rangers	Partick Thistle	Archie Aikman (Falkirk)	20
1948–49	Rangers (26)	Dundee	Hibernian	Alex Stott (Dundee)	30
1949–50	Rangers (27)	Hibernian	Heart of Midlothian	Willie Bauld (Heart of Midlothian)	30
1950–51	Hibernian (3)	Rangers	Dundee	Lawrie Reilly (Hibernian)	22
1951–52	Hibernian (4)	Rangers	East Fife	Lawrie Reilly (Hibernian)	27
1952–53	Rangers (28)	Hibernian	East Fife	Lawrie Reilly (Hibernian); Charlie Fleming (East Fife)	30
1953–54	Celtic (20)	Heart of Midlothian	Partick Thistle	Jimmy Wardhaugh (Heart of Midlothian)	27
1954–55	Aberdeen (1)	Celtic	Rangers	Willie Bauld (Heart of Midlothian)	21

=== Scottish Football League Division One (1955–1975) ===
Season	Champions	Runners-up	Third place	Top scorer(s)	
Season	Champions	Runners-up	Third place	Player(s)	Goals
1955–56	Rangers (29)	Aberdeen	Heart of Midlothian	Jimmy Wardhaugh (Heart of Midlothian)	28
1956–57	Rangers (30)	Heart of Midlothian	Kilmarnock	Hugh Baird (Airdrieonians)	33
1957–58	Heart of Midlothian (3)	Rangers	Celtic	Jimmy Wardhaugh (Heart of Midlothian); Jimmy Murray (Heart of Midlothian)	28
1958–59	Rangers (31)	Heart of Midlothian	Motherwell	Joe Baker (Hibernian)	25
1959–60	Heart of Midlothian (4)	Kilmarnock	Rangers	Joe Baker (Hibernian)	42
1960–61	Rangers (32)	Kilmarnock	Third Lanark	Alex Harley (Third Lanark)	42
1961–62	Dundee (1)	Rangers	Celtic	Alan Gilzean (Dundee)	24
1962–63	Rangers (33)	Kilmarnock	Partick Thistle	Jimmy Millar (Rangers)	27
1963–64	Rangers (34)	Kilmarnock	Celtic	Alan Gilzean (Dundee)	32
1964–65	Kilmarnock (1)	Heart of Midlothian	Dunfermline Athletic	Jim Forrest (Rangers)	30
1965–66	Celtic (21)	Rangers	Kilmarnock	Joe McBride (Celtic); Alex Ferguson (Dunfermline Athletic)	31
1966–67	Celtic (22) (Note: Celtic also won the European Cup)	Rangers	Clyde	Stevie Chalmers (Celtic)	21
1967–68	Celtic (23)	Rangers	Hibernian	Bobby Lennox (Celtic)	32
1968–69	Celtic (24)	Rangers	Dunfermline Athletic	Kenny Cameron (Dundee United)	26
1969–70	Celtic (25)	Rangers	Hibernian	Colin Stein (Rangers)	24
1970–71	Celtic (26)	Aberdeen	St Johnstone	Harry Hood (Celtic)	22
1971–72	Celtic (27)	Aberdeen	Rangers (Note: Rangers won the European Cup Winners' Cup)	Joe Harper (Aberdeen)	33
1972–73	Celtic (28)	Rangers	Hibernian	Alan Gordon (Hibernian)	27
1973–74	Celtic (29)	Hibernian	Rangers	Dixie Deans (Celtic)	26
1974–75	Rangers (35)	Hibernian	Celtic	Andy Gray (Dundee United); Willie Pettigrew (Motherwell)	20

=== Scottish Football League Premier Division (1975–1998) ===
Season	Champions	Runners-up	Third place	Top scorer(s)	
Season	Champions	Runners-up	Third place	Player(s)	Goals
1975–76	Rangers (36)	Celtic	Hibernian	Kenny Dalglish (Celtic)	24
1976–77	Celtic (30)	Rangers	Aberdeen	Willie Pettigrew (Motherwell)	21
1977–78	Rangers (37)	Aberdeen	Dundee United	Derek Johnstone (Rangers)	25
1978–79	Celtic (31)	Rangers	Dundee United	Andy Ritchie (Morton)	22
1979–80	Aberdeen (2)	Celtic	St Mirren	Doug Somner (St Mirren)	25
1980–81	Celtic (32)	Aberdeen	Rangers	Frank McGarvey (Celtic)	23
1981–82	Celtic (33)	Aberdeen	Rangers	George McCluskey (Celtic)	21
1982–83	Dundee United (1)	Celtic	Aberdeen (Note: Aberdeen also won the European Cup Winners' Cup)	Charlie Nicholas (Celtic)	29
1983–84	Aberdeen (3) (Note: Aberdeen also won the European Super Cup)	Celtic	Dundee United	Brian McClair (Celtic)	23
1984–85	Aberdeen (4)	Celtic	Dundee United	Frank McDougall (Aberdeen)	22
1985–86	Celtic (34)	Heart of Midlothian	Dundee United	Ally McCoist (Rangers)	24
1986–87	Rangers (38)	Celtic	Dundee United	Brian McClair (Celtic)	35
1987–88	Celtic (35)	Heart of Midlothian	Rangers	Tommy Coyne (Dundee)	33
1988–89	Rangers (39)	Aberdeen	Celtic	Mark McGhee (Celtic); Charlie Nicholas (Aberdeen)	16
1989–90	Rangers (40)	Aberdeen	Heart of Midlothian	John Robertson (Heart of Midlothian)	17
1990–91	Rangers (41)	Aberdeen	Celtic	Tommy Coyne (Celtic)	18
1991–92	Rangers (42)	Heart of Midlothian	Celtic	Ally McCoist (Rangers)	34
1992–93	Rangers (43)	Aberdeen	Celtic	Ally McCoist (Rangers)	34
1993–94	Rangers (44)	Aberdeen	Motherwell	Mark Hateley (Rangers)	22
1994–95	Rangers (45)	Motherwell	Hibernian	Tommy Coyne (Motherwell)	16
1995–96	Rangers (46)	Celtic	Aberdeen	Pierre van Hooijdonk (Celtic)	26
1996–97	Rangers (47)	Celtic	Dundee United	Jorge Cadete (Celtic)	25
1997–98	Celtic (36)	Rangers	Heart of Midlothian	Marco Negri (Rangers)	32

=== Scottish Premier League (1998–2013) ===
Season	Champions	Runners-up	Third place	Top scorer(s)	
Season	Champions	Runners-up	Third place	Player(s)	Goals
1998–99	Rangers (48)	Celtic	St Johnstone	Henrik Larsson (Celtic)	29
1999–2000	Rangers (49)	Celtic	Heart of Midlothian	Mark Viduka (Celtic)	25
2000–01	Celtic (37)	Rangers	Hibernian	Henrik Larsson (Celtic)	35
2001–02	Celtic (38)	Rangers	Livingston	Henrik Larsson (Celtic)	29
2002–03	Rangers (50)	Celtic	Heart of Midlothian	Henrik Larsson (Celtic)	28
2003–04	Celtic (39)	Rangers	Heart of Midlothian	Henrik Larsson (Celtic)	30
2004–05	Rangers (51)	Celtic	Hibernian	John Hartson (Celtic)	25
2005–06	Celtic (40)	Heart of Midlothian	Rangers	Kris Boyd (Kilmarnock, Rangers)	32
2006–07	Celtic (41)	Rangers	Aberdeen	Kris Boyd (Rangers)	20
2007–08	Celtic (42)	Rangers	Motherwell	Scott McDonald (Celtic)	25
2008–09	Rangers (52)	Celtic	Heart of Midlothian	Kris Boyd (Rangers)	27
2009–10	Rangers (53)	Celtic	Dundee United	Kris Boyd (Rangers)	23
2010–11	Rangers (54)	Celtic	Heart of Midlothian	Kenny Miller (Rangers)	21
2011–12	Celtic (43)	Rangers	Motherwell	Gary Hooper (Celtic)	24
2012–13	Celtic (44)	Motherwell	St Johnstone	Michael Higdon (Motherwell)	26

=== Scottish Premiership (2013–present) ===
Season	Champions	Runners-up	Third place	Top scorer(s)	
Season	Champions	Runners-up	Third place	Player(s)	Goals
2013–14	Celtic (45)	Motherwell	Aberdeen	Kris Commons (Celtic)	27
2014–15	Celtic (46)	Aberdeen	Inverness Caledonian Thistle	Adam Rooney (Aberdeen)	18
2015–16	Celtic (47)	Aberdeen	Heart of Midlothian	Leigh Griffiths (Celtic)	31
2016–17	Celtic (48)	Aberdeen	Rangers	Liam Boyce (Ross County)	23
2017–18	Celtic (49)	Aberdeen	Rangers	Kris Boyd (Kilmarnock)	18
2018–19	Celtic (50)	Rangers	Kilmarnock	Alfredo Morelos (Rangers)	18
2019–20 (Note: The 2019–20 Scottish Premiership was suspended in March 2020 due to the COVID-19 pandemic in Scotland. The season was subsequently curtailed on 18 May 2020 and a points per game average was used to calculate a final table.)	Celtic (51)	Rangers	Motherwell	Odsonne Édouard (Celtic)	22
2020–21	Rangers (55)	Celtic	Hibernian	Odsonne Édouard (Celtic)	18
2021–22	Celtic (52)	Rangers	Heart of Midlothian	Regan Charles-Cook (Ross County); Giorgos Giakoumakis (Celtic)	13
2022–23	Celtic (53)	Rangers	Aberdeen	Kyōgo Furuhashi (Celtic)	27
2023–24	Celtic (54)	Rangers	Heart of Midlothian	Lawrence Shankland (Heart of Midlothian)	24
2024–25	Celtic (55)	Rangers	Hibernian	Cyriel Dessers (Rangers)	18
2025–26	Celtic (56)	Heart of Midlothian	Rangers	Tawanda Maswanhise (Motherwell)	17

== Total titles won ==
Titles won by club (%) (Note: Rangers and Dumbarton figures include one title shared in 1890–91.)
1. Celtic: 56 (43.1%)
2. Rangers: 55 (42.3%)
3. Aberdeen: 4 (3.08%)
4. Heart of Midlothian: 4 (3.08%)
5. Hibernian: 4 (3.08%)
6. Dumbarton: 2 (1.54%)
7. Motherwell: 1 (0.77%)
8. Kilmarnock: 1 (0.77%)
9. Dundee: 1 (0.77%)
10. Dundee United: 1 (0.77%)
11. Third Lanark: 1 (0.77%)

As of 16 May 2026

- Clubs participating in the 2026–27 Scottish Premiership are denoted in **bold** type.
- Clubs no longer active are denoted in italics.

Club	Champions	Runners-up	Third place	Last Championship
**Celtic**	56	32	17	2025–26
**Rangers**	55	37	21	2020–21
**Aberdeen**	4	17	10	1984–85
**Heart of Midlothian**	4	15	20	1959–60
**Hibernian**	4	6	15	1951–52
Dumbarton	2	0	0	1891–92
**Motherwell**	1	7	9	1931–32
**Kilmarnock**	1	4	4	1964–65
**Dundee**	1	4	1	1961–62
**Dundee United**	1	0	8	1982–83
Third Lanark	1	0	2	1903–04
Airdrieonians (1878)	0	4	2	—
**Falkirk**	0	2	1	—
Morton (Note: Morton are now known as Greenock Morton.)	0	1	4	—
Clyde	0	0	3	—
Partick Thistle	0	0	3	—
**St Johnstone**	0	0	3	—
Dunfermline Athletic	0	0	2	—
East Fife	0	0	2	—
**St Mirren**	0	0	2	—
Inverness Caledonian Thistle	0	0	1	—
Livingston	0	0	1	—
Raith Rovers	0	0	1	—
St Bernard's	0	0	1	—

=== By city/town ===
City / town	Championships	Clubs	Last championship
Glasgow (Note: The total includes one championship shared by Rangers (Glasgow) and Dumbarton, in 1890–91.)	112	**Celtic** (56), **Rangers** (55), Third Lanark (1)	2025–26 (Celtic)
Edinburgh	8	**Heart of Midlothian** (4), **Hibernian** (4)	1959–60 (Heart of Midlothian)
Aberdeen	4	**Aberdeen** (4)	1984–85 (Aberdeen)
Dumbarton	2	Dumbarton (2)	1891–92 (Dumbarton)
Dundee	2	**Dundee** (1), **Dundee United** (1)	1982–83 (Dundee United)
Kilmarnock	1	**Kilmarnock** (1)	1964–65 (Kilmarnock)
Motherwell	1	**Motherwell** (1)	1931–32 (Motherwell)

- Teams in Italics are defunct.
- Teams in **Bold** currently participate in the Scottish Premiership.

== See also ==
- List of Scottish League Cup finals
- List of Scottish Cup finals
