= Mick Gibbons =

Scottish footballer (1890–1952)

Personal information
- Full name: Michael Gibbons
- Date of birth: 19 February 1890
- Place of birth: Kingseat, Scotland
- Date of death: 22 August 1952 (aged 62)
- Place of death: Dunfermline, Scotland
- Positions: Inside right; right half

Senior career*
Years	Team	Apps	(Gls)
–1910	Lumphinnans Swifts		
1910–1919	Falkirk	140	(23)
1917–1918	Cowdenbeath		
1920–1921	East Fife		
- * Club domestic league appearances and goals

Michael Gibbons (19 February 1890 – 22 August 1952) was a Scottish professional footballer who made 140 appearances in the Scottish League for Falkirk as an inside right and right half.

== Personal life ==
Gibbons served as a private in McCrae's Battalion of the Royal Scots during the First World War.

== Career statistics ==
Appearances and goals by club, season and competition
Club	Season	League			Scottish Cup		Total	
Club	Season	Division	Apps	Goals	Apps	Goals	Apps	Goals
Falkirk	1910–11	Scottish Division One	7	1	0	0	7	1
Falkirk	1911–12	Scottish Division One	4	0	0	0	4	0
Falkirk	1912–13	Scottish Division One	10	0	4	1	14	1
Falkirk	1913–14	Scottish Division One	30	6	1	0	31	6
Falkirk	1914–15	Scottish Division One	28	6	—		28	6
Falkirk	1915–16	Scottish Division One	36	5	—		36	5
Falkirk	1916–17	Scottish Division One	17	4	—		17	4
Falkirk	1917–18	Scottish Division One	1	0	—		1	0
Falkirk	1918–19	Scottish Division One	7	1	—		7	1
Career total			140	23	5	1	145	24

== Honours ==
Falkirk

- Scottish Cup: 1912–13
- North-Eastern Cup: 1911–12
- Dunedin Cup: 1913–14
- Dewar Shield: 1913–14
- Falkirk District Charity Cup: 1913–14
- Falkirk Infirmary Shield: 1912–13, 1913–14, 1914–15, 1915–16
