= Alfie Briggs =

Scottish footballer

Personal information
- Full name: Alfred Ernest Briggs
- Date of birth: 4 February 1888
- Place of birth: Glasgow, Scotland
- Date of death: 18 March 1950 (aged 62)
- Place of death: Scotland
- Position: Wing half

Senior career*
Years	Team	Apps	(Gls)
–1912	Clydebank Juniors		
1912–1917	Heart of Midlothian	58	(0)

International career
1912	Scotland Juniors	1	(0)
- * Club domestic league appearances and goals

Alfred Ernest Briggs (4 February 1888 – 18 March 1950) was a Scottish professional footballer who played in the Scottish League for Heart of Midlothian as a wing half. He later scouted for Partick Thistle.

== Career ==
Briggs began his career with junior club Clydebank Juniors. After being capped by the Scotland junior team in 1912, he was signed by Heart of Midlothian manager John McCartney. Briggs made 70 appearances for the club between 1912 and 1917 and was forced to retire due to wounds sustained during the First World War. He later returned to play in Peter Nellies' testimonial match in April 1921.

== Personal life ==
After the outbreak of the First World War in August 1914, Briggs enlisted as a corporal in McCrae's Battalion of the Royal Scots. He was badly wounded near La Boisselle on the first day of the Somme, being "hit by four machine gun bullets; one in his leg, another in his left foot and through his arm, another in his right ankle, coming out above the knee and another winging his forehead, knocking him out". He sought refuge in a shell hole and was returned to an advanced dressing station near Bécourt, where he was expected to die, but made a recovery before being returned to Britain.

Prior to becoming a professional footballer, Briggs worked as a machine builder for the Singer Corporation in Clydebank. He later returned to work after the war as a boilermaker. At the time of his death in 1950, Briggs still had two German bullets lodged in his back.

== Honours ==
Heart of Midlothian

- Rosebery Charity Cup: 1912–13

== Career statistics ==
Appearances and goals by club, season and competition
Club	Season	League			Scottish Cup		Other		Total	
Club	Season	Division	Apps	Goals	Apps	Goals	Apps	Goals	Apps	Goals
Heart of Midlothian	1912–13	Scottish First Division	10	0	0	0	2 (Note: Appearances in Rosebery Charity Cup)	0	12	0
Heart of Midlothian	1913–14	Scottish First Division	3	0	0	0	4 (Note: 2 appearances in Rosebery Charity Cup, 1 appearance in East of Scotland Shield, 1 appearance in Wilson Cup)	0	7	0
Heart of Midlothian	1914–15	Scottish First Division	38	0	—		6 (Note: 2 appearances in East of Scotland Shield, 2 appearances in Dunedin Cup, 1 appearance in Rosebery Charity Cup, 1 appearance in Wilson Cup)	0	44	0
Heart of Midlothian	1915–16	Scottish First Division	1	0	—		0	0	1	0
Heart of Midlothian	1917–18	Scottish First Division	6	0	—		0	0	6	0
Career total			58	0	0	0	12	0	70	0
