= McCrae's Battalion =

Scottish infantry battalion in World War I

McCrae's Battalion was the affectionate name given by the people of Edinburgh to the 16th (Service) Battalion of the Royal Scots in World War I, raised from volunteers in 1914 as part of the New Armies called to the Colours by Lord Kitchener. The unit was named after its charismatic colonel, former Liberal MP for Edinburgh East, Sir George McCrae.

== Background ==
Largely composed of professional and amateur sportsmen, "McCrae's" was the first of the so-called 'footballers' Pals battalions to be raised during the war and was the main inspiration behind the creation of the 17th Battalion, Middlesex Regiment in 1915.

16 players from Heart of Midlothian F.C. ("Hearts") enlisted, along with 500 supporters and ticket-holders. Hearts were leading the Scottish League at the time the battalion was raised in November 1914. In addition to the Hearts contingent, players and 150 followers of Hibernian, seven Raith Rovers players and a number of professional footballers from Falkirk, Dunfermline Athletic, East Fife and St Bernard's also enlisted. Fans were encouraged to follow in their heroes' footsteps and fight alongside the men they cheered on every Saturday afternoon. Rugby players, athletes and a variety of other sportsmen also joined the battalion.

The contemporary Hearts manager John McCartney authored two booklets documenting Scottish footballers in the Great War and those from Hearts who perished.

The unit was named after its charismatic colonel, Sir George McCrae, a former Liberal MP for Edinburgh East. It was the subject of a detailed historical account published in 2003 by Jack Alexander. Shortly after the publication of this book, a memorial cairn was constructed in the village of Contalmaison on the Somme. Designed by Alexander, the McCrae's Battalion Great War Memorial cairn now attracts hundreds of visitors every year to the village.

In October 2014, the battalion was inducted to the Scottish Football Hall of Fame.

== Gallery ==
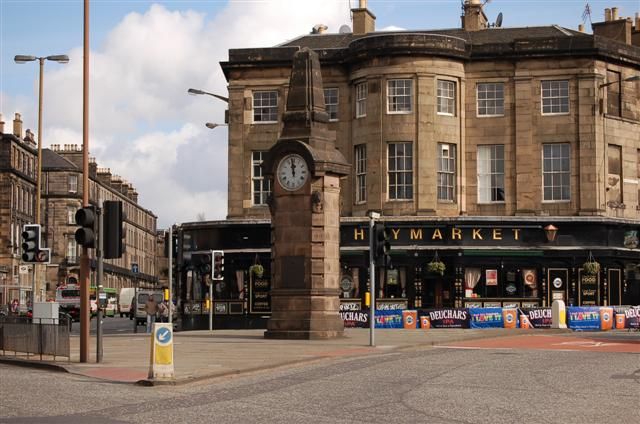
Hearts war memorial at Haymarket, Edinburgh

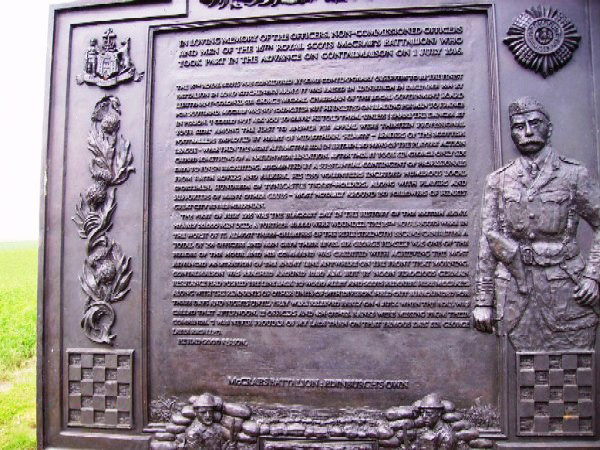
detail of Contalmaison cairn (1)

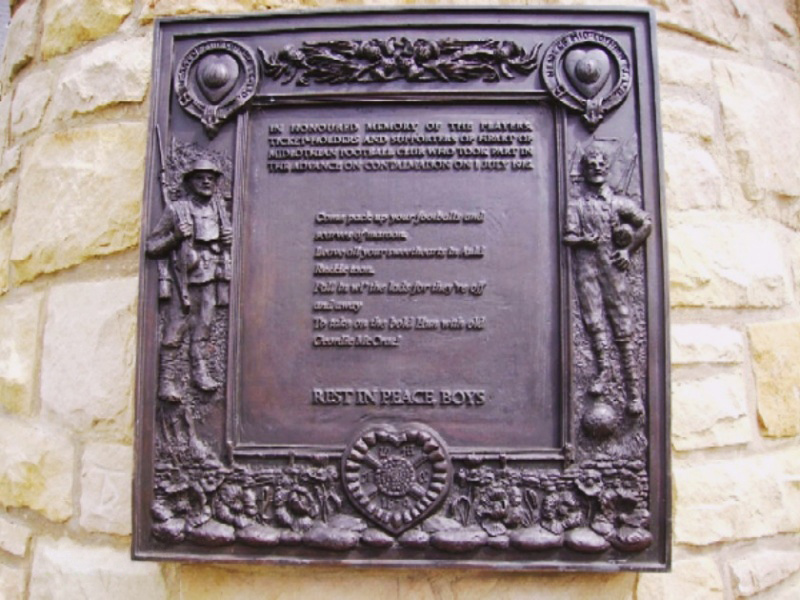
detail of Contalmaison cairn (2)

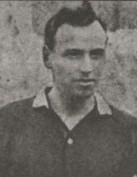
Tom Gracie, one of those who lost their lives

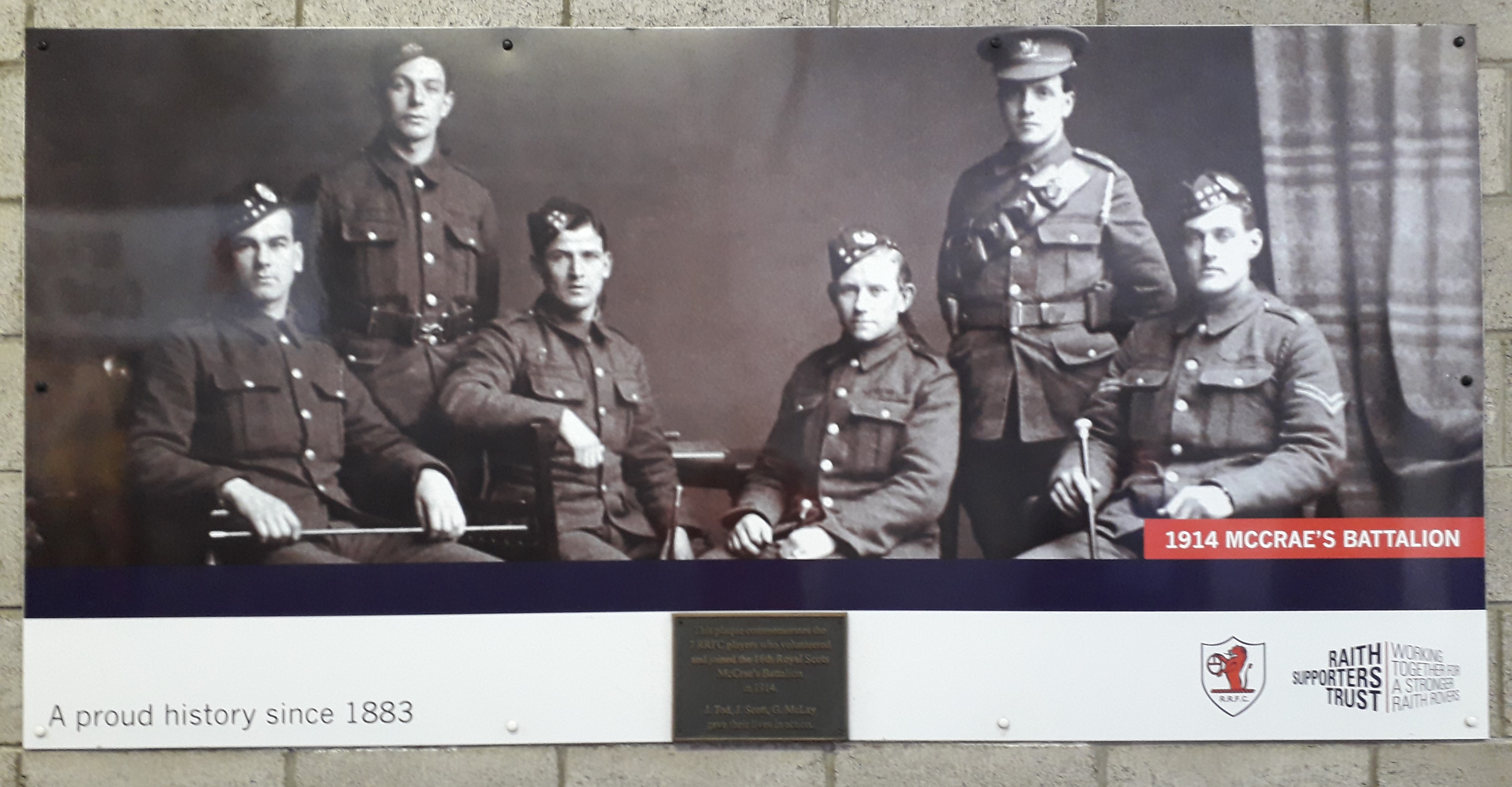
Raith Rovers players in McCrae's Battalion

== Battalion members ==
=== Footballers ===
Rank	Name	Nationality	Position	Club prior to enlistment	Battalion(s)	Wartime death date	Wartime death place	Decorations	Notes	Ref
Cpt	James Logan	Scotland	CF	Raith Rovers	16th	—	—	—		
CSM	Annan Ness	Scotland	LH	Heart of Midlothian	9th, 16th	—	—	—	(Note: Commissioned into the 9th Battalion, Royal Scots.)	
SSgt	Jimmy Frew	Scotland	LB	Heart of Midlothian	16th	—	—	—	(Note: Transferred to the Royal Garrison Artillery.)	
Sgt	Duncan Currie	Scotland	FB	Heart of Midlothian	16th	1 July 1916 (aged 23)	Somme, France	—		
Sgt	George McLay	Scotland	RH	Raith Rovers	16th	22 October 1917 (aged 27–28)	Passchendaele, Belgium	MM		
Cpl	Alfie Briggs	Scotland	WH	Heart of Midlothian	16th	—	—	—	(Note: Medically discharged.)	
Cpl	Norman Findlay	England	GK	Heart of Midlothian	16th	—	—	—	(Note: Discharged to trade in September 1916.)	
Cpl	Tom Gracie	Scotland	CF	Heart of Midlothian	16th	23 October 1915 (aged 26)	Glasgow, Scotland	—		
LCpl	Alex Henderson	Scotland	LB	Falkirk	16th	—	—	—		
Pte	Jimmy Boyd	Scotland	GK	Heart of Midlothian	16th	3 August 1916 (aged 20–21)	Somme, France	—		
Pte	Paddy Crossan	Scotland	FB	Heart of Midlothian	16th	—	—	—		
Pte	Ernest Ellis	England	RB	Heart of Midlothian	16th	1 July 1916 (aged 30)	Somme, France	—		
Pte	Mick Gibbons	Scotland	IF	Falkirk	16th	—	—	—		
Pte	Bob Godfrey	Scotland	CH	Falkirk	16th	—	—	—		
Pte	Jimmy Hawthorn	Scotland	HB	Heart of Midlothian	16th	1 July 1916	Somme, France	—		
Pte	Jimmy Hazeldean	Scotland	OL	Heart of Midlothian	16th	—	—	—		
Pte	Andy Henderson	Scotland	CH	Falkirk	16th	—	—	—		
Pte	David Izatt	Scotland	HB	Dunfermline Athletic	16th	1 July 1916 (aged 23–24)	Somme, France	—		
Pte	William Lavery	Scotland	RB	Raith Rovers	16th	—	—	—		
Pte	Teddy McGuire	Scotland	IR	Heart of Midlothian	16th	—	—	—		
Pte	John Morrison	Scotland	FW	Falkirk	16th	—	—	—		
Pte	Jimmy Morton	Scotland	IL	Kilmarnock	16th	1 July 1916 (aged 22)	Somme, France	—		
Pte	Willie Porter	Scotland	CH	Raith Rovers	16th	—	—	—		
Pte	Bob Preston	Scotland	HB	Heart of Midlothian	16th	—	—	—	(Note: Transferred to the Highland Light Infantry.)	
Pte	Jock Rattray	Scotland	IF	Raith Rovers	16th	—	—	—		
Pte	Frank Reilly	Scotland	CH	Falkirk	16th	—	—	—		
Pte	James Scott	Scotland	FW	Raith Rovers	16th	1 July 1916 (aged 20–21)	Somme, France	—		
Pte	Wattie Scott	Scotland	CH	Heart of Midlothian	16th	—	—	—		
Pte	Harold Sparkes	England	CF	Glossop	3rd, 11th, 16th	3 June 1917 (aged 20–21)	Pas-de-Calais, France	—		
Pte	Jimmy Todd	Scotland	OF	Raith Rovers	16th	12 March 1916 (aged 20–21)	Nord, France	—		
Pte	Harry Wattie	Scotland	FW	Heart of Midlothian	16th	1 July 1916 (aged 23)	Somme, France	—		
Pte	Willie Wilson	Scotland	OF	Heart of Midlothian	13th, 16th	—	—	—	(Note: Transferred to the 13th Battalion, Royal Scots and later returned to the 16th Battalion.)	
Pte	Bobby Wood	Scotland	OF	Falkirk	16th	—	—	—		
n/a	Sandy Grosert	Scotland	RH	Hibernian	16th	—	—	MM	(Note: Transferred to the Machine Gun Corps in 1915 and was later commissioned into the Gordon Highlanders.) (Note: Decoration won while serving with another unit.)	
n/a	James Low	Scotland	OF	Heart of Midlothian	16th	—	—	—	(Note: Commissioned into the Seaforth Highlanders.)	

=== Other sportsmen ===
Rank	Name	Nationality	Sport	Club prior to enlistment	Battalion(s)	Wartime death date	Wartime death place	Decorations	Notes	Ref
Lt	Arthur Flett	Scotland	Rugby union	Edinburgh Wanderers	16th	9 April 1917	Pas-de-Calais, France	—		
Cpt	Napier Armit	Scotland	Cricket	Grange CC	16th	4 August 1916	Somme, France	—		
Sgt	Finlay MacRae	Scotland	Field hockey	n/a	16th	26 August 1917 (aged 30)	Somme, France	MM and Bar		
Pte	Arthur Grant	Scotland	Golf	Le Touquet	16th	—	—	—		
Pte	Harry Harley	Scotland	Athletics	Edinburgh Northern Harriers	16th	1 July 1916	Somme, France	—		
n/a	Ned Barnie	Scotland	Swimming	—	16th	—	—	MM	(Note: Transferred to the Royal Engineers.)	
n/a	John Dallas	Scotland	Rugby union	Retired	16th	—	—	—		
n/a	Jim Davie	Scotland	Rugby union	Stewart's Melville	16th	—	—	MC		
n/a	Murdoch McLeod	Scotland	Bodybuilding	—	16th	1916	Somme, France	—		

== See also ==
- Football Battalion
- Heart of Midlothian F.C. and World War I
