= Frank Reilly (footballer) =

Scottish footballer

Personal information
- Full name: Francis Reilly
- Date of birth: 26 May 1894
- Place of birth: Perth, Scotland
- Date of death: 1956 (aged 61–62)
- Height: 5 ft 10 in (1.78 m)
- Position: Centre half

Senior career*
Years	Team	Apps	(Gls)
1911–1912	Perth Roselea		
1912–1919	Falkirk	109	(7)
1919–1923	Blackburn Rovers	127	(8)
1923–	Llanelly		
	Swansea Town	0	(0)
–1924	Llanelly		
1924–1925	Weymouth		
- Lancaster City
- * Club domestic league appearances and goals

Francis Reilly (26 May 1894 – 1956) was a Scottish professional footballer who played as a centre half in the Football League for Blackburn Rovers and in the Scottish League for Falkirk.

== Personal life ==
Reilly served as a private in McCrae's Battalion of the Royal Scots during the First World War. He was wounded during the course of his service.

== Career statistics ==
Appearances and goals by club, season and competition
Club	Season	League			National Cup		Total	
Club	Season	Division	Apps	Goals	Apps	Goals	Apps	Goals
Falkirk	1912–13	Scottish First Division	1	0	1	0	2	0
Falkirk	1913–14	Scottish First Division	34	2	0	0	34	2
Falkirk	1914–15	Scottish First Division	37	3	—		37	3
Falkirk	1915–16	Scottish First Division	35	2	—		35	2
Falkirk	1916–17	Scottish First Division	1	0	—		1	0
Falkirk	1917–18	Scottish First Division	1	0	—		1	0
Falkirk	1919–20	Scottish First Division	8	0	0	0	8	0
Career total			109	7	0	0	109	7
