= John Morrison (footballer, born 1889) =

Scottish footballer

Personal information
- Full name: John Morrison
- Date of birth: 26 January 1889
- Place of birth: Stenhousemuir, Scotland
- Date of death: 26 January 1972 (aged 83)
- Place of death: Paisley, Scotland
- Position: Utility player

Senior career*
Years	Team	Apps	(Gls)
–1907	Stenhousemuir Hearts		
1907–1919	Falkirk	120	(18)
1914	→ St Mirren (loan)	12	(0)

Managerial career
- 1927–1929: Third Lanark
- 1929–1936: St Mirren
- 1937–1941: Airdrieonians
- * Club domestic league appearances and goals

John Morrison (26 January 1889 – 26 January 1972) was a Scottish professional footballer who made 120 appearances in the Scottish League for Falkirk as a utility player. After his retirement from football, he managed Third Lanark, St Mirren and Airdrieonians. He was nicknamed 'Slasher'.

== Personal life ==
Morrison served as a private in McCrae's Battalion of the Royal Scots during the First World War.

== Career statistics ==
=== Player ===
Appearances and goals by club, season and competition
Club	Season	League			National Cup		Total	
Club	Season	Division	Apps	Goals	Apps	Goals	Apps	Goals
Falkirk	1907–08	Scottish First Division	4	1	0	0	4	1
Falkirk	1908–09	Scottish First Division	11	0	0	0	11	0
Falkirk	1909–10	Scottish First Division	3	1	0	0	3	1
Falkirk	1910–11	Scottish First Division	29	6	3	2	32	8
Falkirk	1911–12	Scottish First Division	19	2	4	0	23	2
Falkirk	1912–13	Scottish First Division	23	2	1	0	24	2
Falkirk	1913–14	Scottish First Division	12	0	—		12	0
Falkirk	1914–15	Scottish First Division	19	6	—		19	6
Falkirk	Total		120	18	8	2	128	20
St Mirren (loan)	1913–14	Scottish First Division	12	0	4	0	16	0
Career total			132	18	12	2	144	20

=== Manager ===
Team	From	To	Record					Ref
Team	From	To	G	W	D	L	Win %	Ref
Third Lanark	1927	1929	69	25	13	31	36.23	
St Mirren	1929	1936	302	133	45	124	44.04	
Total			371	158	58	155	42.59	—

== Honours ==
=== Player ===
Falkirk

- Dunedin Cup: 1913–14
- Stirlingshire Cup: 1909–10
- Stirlingshire Consolation Cup: 1906–07, 1907–08
- Falkirk Infirmary Shield: 1906–07, 1908–09, 1912–13

=== Manager ===
Third Lanark

- Scottish League Second Division second-place promotion: 1927–28

St Mirren

- Scottish League Second Division second-place promotion: 1935–36
