= George McLay =

Scottish footballer

Personal information
- Full name: George McLay
- Date of birth: 1889
- Place of birth: Crossgates, Scotland
- Date of death: 22 October 1917 (aged 28)
- Place of death: near Poelcappelle, Belgium
- Position: Wing half

Senior career*
Years	Team	Apps	(Gls)
–1910	Glencraig Celtic		
1910–1915	Raith Rovers	79	(5)
- * Club domestic league appearances and goals

George McLay MM (1889 – 22 October 1917) was a Scottish professional footballer who played in the Scottish League for Raith Rovers as a wing half.

== Personal life ==
McLay served as a sergeant in McCrae's Battalion of the Royal Scots during the First World War and saw action at the Battle of the Somme. As McLay advanced near Poelcappelle during the Battle of Passchendaele on 22 October 1917, he became trapped in barbed wire and was shot multiple times, before being shot through the head. He was posthumously awarded the Military Medal for his actions. McLay is commemorated on the Tyne Cot Memorial.

== Career statistics ==
Appearances and goals by club, season and competition
Club	Season	League			Scottish Cup		Total	
Club	Season	Division	Apps	Goals	Apps	Goals	Apps	Goals
Raith Rovers	1910–11	Scottish First Division	9	2	0	0	9	2
Raith Rovers	1911–12	Scottish First Division	19	0	2	0	21	0
Raith Rovers	1912–13	Scottish First Division	20	2	2	0	22	2
Raith Rovers	1913–14	Scottish First Division	21	1	0	0	21	1
Raith Rovers	1914–15	Scottish First Division	10	0	—		10	0
Career total			79	5	4	0	83	5

== Honours ==
- Raith Rovers Hall of Fame
