= Walter Scott (disambiguation) =

Sir Walter Scott (1771–1832) was a Scottish poet and novelist.

Walter Scott may also refer to:

== Nobility ==
- Walter Scott, 4th Baron of Buccleuch (1549–1574)
- Sir Walter Scott, 1st Lord Scott of Buccleuch (1565–1611), Scottish nobleman and border reiver
- Walter Scott, 1st Earl of Buccleuch (before 1606–1633), Scottish nobleman
- Sir Walter Scott of Branxholme and Buccleuch (c. 1495–1552), nobleman of the Scottish Borders
- Walter Scott, Earl of Tarras (1644–1693), Scottish nobleman
- Sir Walter Scott, 1st Baronet, of Beauclerc (1826–1910), English building contractor and publisher
- Walter Montagu Douglas Scott, 5th Duke of Buccleuch (1806–1884), British politician and nobleman
- Walter Montagu Douglas Scott, 8th Duke of Buccleuch (1894–1973), politician and Conservative peer
- Walter Henry Montagu Douglas Scott, Earl of Dalkeith (1861–1886), Scottish nobleman and cricketer

== Sportsmen ==
- Walter Scott (Australian footballer) (1899–1989), Australian rules footballer for Norwood
- Walter Scott (footballer, born 1886) (1886–1955), English footballer
- Walter Scott (footballer, born 1932) (1932–1988), Scottish footballer for Dumbarton and Halifax Town
- Walter Scott (soccer) (born 1999), Australian footballer
- Walter Scott (American football) (born 1973), American football player
- Walter Scott (American cricketer) (1864/68–1907), American cricketer for Philadelphia
- Walter Scott (Australian cricketer) (1907–1989), Australian cricketer for Victoria
- Walter Scott (South African cricketer) (1892–1963), South African cricketer for Border
- Walter P. Scott (fl. 1910–1914), Scottish footballer for Queen's Park
- Wattie Scott (died 1975), English footballer for Heart of Midlothian
- Wally Scott (footballer), Australian rules footballer

== Entertainers ==
- Walter E. Scott (1872–1954), American performer and con man, also known as Death Valley Scotty
- Walter Irving Scott (1895–1995), magician
- Walter M. Scott (1906–1989), American set decorator
- Walter Scott, one of the lead singers of the R&B/soul group the Whispers
- Walter Scott (artist) (born 1985) Canadian comic book artist
- Walter Scott (singer) (1943–1983), American singer
- Walter Scott, the pen name of Lloyd Shearer, a gossip columnist

== Politicians ==
- Walter Scott (Canadian politician) (1867–1938), first Premier of Saskatchewan
- Walter K. Scott (1915–1977), United States Assistant Secretary of State for Administration
- Bob Scott (New South Wales politician) (Walter Robert Scott, born 1943), New South Wales politician
- Walter Scott (Northern Ireland politician) (1908–?), MP in the Northern Ireland Parliament for Belfast Bloomfield
- Walter F. Scott (1856–1938), banker and politician who served as Vermont State Treasurer
- Walter Scott (Queensland politician) (1844–1890), member of the Queensland Legislative Assembly
- Walter A. Scott (1876–1963), mayor of Jackson, Mississippi
- Walter Scott (MP for Roxburghshire) (1724–1793), Scottish MP

== Clergymen ==
- Walter Quincy Scott (1845–1917), American Presbyterian minister, president of Ohio State University
- Walter Scott (clergyman) (1796–1861), Christian evangelist for the Mahoning Baptist Association and a leader in the Campbell/Stone Restoration Movement

== Businessmen ==
- Walter Scott, co-founder of the clothing brand Lyle & Scott
- Sir Walter D. Scott (died 1981), Australian accountant, founder of the management consultancy firm WD Scott
- Walter Dill Scott (businessman) (1931–2018), American business executive
- Walter Scott Jr. (1931–2021), director of Berkshire Hathaway, chairman of Level 3 Communications
- Walter Scott (investment manager) (born 1947), Scottish founder of Walter Scott and Partners

== Others ==
- Walter Dill Scott (1869–1955), American applied psychologist
- Walter Scott, pseudonymous columnist for Parade magazine (ultimately Edward Klein)
- Walter Scott Medal for Valor or Scott Medal, a medal awarded for bravery to Irish police officers
- Walter Scott (scholar) (1855–1925), English academic
- Walter Scott of Harden (died 1629), Border reiver
- Walter Stone Scott (1871–1948), American postage stamp auctioneer
- Walter Scott (educationalist) (1902–1985), New Zealand teacher, educationalist and civil libertarian
- Walter Lamar Scott (1965–2015), South Carolinian shot by a North Charleston police officer convicted for his murder
- Walter Jervoise Scott (1835–1890), grazier in Queensland, Australia
- Walter R. Scott (1929–2001), chronicled black community in Minneapolis
- Sir Walter Lawrence Scott (1880–1951), Indian Civil Service officer from New Zealand

== See also ==
- SS Sir Walter Scott, an 1899 steamship on Loch Katrine, Scotland
- Walter Scott of Buccleuch (disambiguation)
- Walter Scott Prize
