= James Todd =

James, Jim, or Jimmy Todd may refer to:

== Law and politics ==
- James Todd (lawyer) (1786–1863), American lawyer, judge and Attorney-General in Pennsylvania
- James Ruddell-Todd (fl. 1832), English politician
- James Dale Todd (born 1943), United States federal judge
- James Todd (Kansas politician) (born 1982), American politician in Kansas

== Sports ==
- James Todd (cricketer) (1867–1956), English cricketer
- Jimmy Todd (Scottish footballer) (1895–1916), Scottish footballer
- Jimmy Todd (1921–2007), Northern Ireland footballer
- Jim Todd (baseball) (born 1947), American baseball pitcher
- Jim Todd (born 1952), American basketball coach
- James Todd (boxer), Welsh boxer

== Others ==
- James Henthorn Todd (1805–1869), Irish biblical scholar, educator, and historian
- James Todd (Canadian settler) (1832–1925), English-born Canadian settler
- James Cameron Todd (1863–1915), British Anglican canon and schoolmaster
- James M. Todd (1896–1970), American electrical and consulting engineer
- James Todd (actor) (1904–68), American actor known for Riders of the Purple Sage (1931), Titanic (1953) and The Luck of the Irish (1948)

== See also ==
- James Tod (1782–1835), British East India Company officer and Oriental scholar
- James Tod (seigneur) (c. 1742–1816), Scottish-Canadian businessman and political figure
- James Tod of Deanston (c.1795–1858), Scottish lawyer, antiquary and landowner
