= 1911–12 Heart of Midlothian F.C. season =

Heart of Midlothian
1911–12 season
- Manager: John McCartney
- Stadium: Tynecastle Park
- Scottish First Division: 4th
- Scottish Cup: Semi-final

During the 1911–12 season Hearts competed in the Scottish First Division, the Scottish Cup and the East of Scotland Shield.

== Fixtures ==
=== Dunedin Cup ===
15 August 1911 Dunedin Cup R1	St Bernard's	1–5	Hearts	Royal Gymnasium Ground

23 August 1911 Dunedin Cup SF	Hibernian	0–0	Hearts	Easter Road

28 August 1911 Dunedin Cup SF Replay	Hearts	2–0	Hibernian	Tynecastle Park

30 August 1911 Dunedin Cup Final	Hearts	1–1	Raith Rovers	Tynecastle Park

6 September 1911 Dunedin Cup Final Replay	Hearts	1–1	Raith Rovers	Tynecastle Park

11 September 1911 Dunedin Cup Final 2nd Replay	Hearts	1–0	Raith Rovers	Tynecastle Park

=== North Eastern Cup ===
9 September 1911 North Eastern Cup SF	Hearts	4–3	Aberdeen	Tynecastle Park

2 January 1912 North Eastern Cup	Hearts	1–3	Falkirk	Tynecastle Park

=== Wilson Cup ===
30 April 1912 Wilson Cup Final	Hearts	2–0	Hibernian	Tynecastle Park

=== Rosebery Charity Cup ===
4 May 1912 Rosebery Charity Cup SF	Hearts	5–0	Leith Athletic	Tynecastle Park

=== Scottish Cup ===
27 January 1912 Scottish Cup R1	Hearts	0–0	Hibernian	Tynecastle Park
				Attendance: 32,000

10 February 1912 Scottish Cup R1 Replay	Hibernian	1–1	Hearts	Easter Road
				Attendance: 18,000

14 February 1912 Scottish Cup R1 2nd Replay	Hearts	3–1	Hibernian	Ibrox Park
				Attendance: 25,000

24 February 1912 Scottish Cup R2	Hearts	1–0	Dundee	Tynecastle Park
				Attendance: 30,000

9 March 1912 Scottish Cup R3	Morton	0–1	Hearts	Cappielow Park
				Attendance: 15,000

30 March 1912 Scottish Cup SF	Celtic	3–0	Hearts	Ibrox Park
				Attendance: 43,000

=== Scottish First Division ===
19 August 1911 Scottish First Division	Hearts	1–0	Clyde	Tynecastle Park
				Attendance: 13,500

26 August 1911 Scottish First Division	Queen's Park	0–3	Hearts	Hampden Park
				Attendance: 10,000

2 September 1911 Scottish First Division	Hearts	2–1	Airdrieonians	Tynecastle Park
				Attendance: 12,000

16 September 1911 Scottish First Division	Hearts	1–1	Kilmarnock	Tynecastle Park
				Attendance: 12,500

23 September 1911 Scottish First Division	Morton	2–2	Hearts	Cappielow Park
				Attendance: 6,000

30 September 1911 Scottish First Division	Hearts	2–1	Celtic	Tynecastle Park
				Attendance: 23,000

7 October 1911 Scottish First Division	Dundee	1–1	Hearts	Dens Park
				Attendance: 12,000

14 October 1911 Scottish First Division	Hearts	0–2	Falkirk	Tynecastle Park
				Attendance: 15,500

21 October 1911 Scottish First Division	Third Lanark	3–0	Hearts	Cathkin Park
				Attendance: 6,000

28 October 1911 Scottish First Division	Hearts	1–4	Dundee	Tynecastle Park
				Attendance: 13,000

4 November 1911 Scottish First Division	Hearts	2–0	Raith Rovers	Tynecastle Park
				Attendance: 8,500

11 November 1911 Scottish First Division	Partick Thistle	2–2	Hearts	Firhill Park
				Attendance: 8,000

18 November 1911 Scottish First Division	Kilmarnock	1–3	Hearts	Rugby Park
				Attendance: 4,500

25 November 1911 Scottish First Division	Hearts	1–2	Aberdeen	Tynecastle Park
				Attendance: 9,000

2 December 1911 Scottish First Division	Falkirk	2–2	Hearts	Brockville Park
				Attendance: 6,000

9 December 1911 Scottish First Division	Hibernian	0–4	Hearts	Easter Road
				Attendance: 12,000

16 December 1911 Scottish First Division	Rangers	2–1	Hearts	Ibrox Park
				Attendance: 22,000

23 December 1911 Scottish First Division	Motherwell	0–3	Hearts	Fir Park
				Attendance: 6,000

30 December 1911 Scottish First Division	Hearts	4–0	Third Lanark	Tynecastle Park
				Attendance: 9,000

1 January 1912 Scottish First Division	Hearts	3–0	Hibernian	Tynecastle Park
				Attendance: 18,000

6 January 1912 Scottish First Division	Celtic	1–1	Hearts	Celtic Park
				Attendance: 20,000

13 January 1912 Scottish First Division	Hearts	1–2	St Mirren	Tynecastle Park
				Attendance: 9,000

20 January 1912 Scottish First Division	Hearts	2–0	Morton	Tynecastle Park
				Attendance: 8,500

17 February 1912 Scottish First Division	Raith Rovers	3–1	Hearts	Stark's Park
				Attendance: 6,000

2 March 1912 Scottish First Division	Hamilton Academical	1–1	Hearts	Douglas Park
				Attendance: 1,000

16 March 1912 Scottish First Division	Aberdeen	1–0	Hearts	Pittodrie Park
				Attendance: 4,500

23 March 1912 Scottish First Division	Hearts	0–0	Queen's Park	Tynecastle Park
				Attendance: 6,000

6 April 1912 Scottish First Division	Airdrieonians	2–0	Hearts	Broomfield Park
				Attendance: 1,000

13 April 1912 Scottish First Division	Clyde	1–2	Hearts	Shawfield Stadium
				Attendance: 7,000

15 April 1912 Scottish First Division	Hearts	2–1	Rangers	Tynecastle Park
				Attendance: 9,000

20 April 1912 Scottish First Division	St Mirren	2–0	Hearts	St Mirren Park, Love Street
				Attendance: 2,000

22 April 1912 Scottish First Division	Hearts	2–1	Motherwell	Tynecastle Park
				Attendance: 2,500

24 April 1912 Scottish First Division	Hearts	2–0	Hamilton Academical	Tynecastle Park
				Attendance: 2,500

27 April 1912 Scottish First Division	Hearts	2–1	Partick Thistle	Tynecastle Park
				Attendance: 7,000

== See also ==
- List of Heart of Midlothian F.C. seasons
