= Willie Porter (Scottish footballer) =

Scottish footballer

Personal information
- Full name: William Porter
- Place of birth: Scotland
- Position: Centre half

Senior career*
Years	Team	Apps	(Gls)
–1913	Kirkintilloch Rob Roy		
1913–1919	Raith Rovers	84	(6)
1916	→ Armadale (loan)		
1918	→ St Mirren (loan)	1	(0)
1919	Ayr United	7	(0)
1919–1920	Raith Rovers	40	(5)
1920–1926	Heart of Midlothian	18	(0)
1921–1922	→ Philadelphia (loan)	11	(0)
1923–1924	→ Weymouth (loan)		
- * Club domestic league appearances and goals

William Porter was a Scottish professional footballer who made over 120 appearances in the Scottish League for Raith Rovers. A centre half, he also played senior football for Heart of Midlothian, Ayr United, St Mirren and in the United States.

== Personal life ==
Porter served in McCrae's Battalion of the Royal Scots during the First World War.

== Career statistics ==
Appearances and goals by club, season and competition
Club	Season	League			National Cup		Total	
Club	Season	Division	Apps	Goals	Apps	Goals	Apps	Goals
Raith Rovers	1913–14	Scottish First Division	30	4	2	0	32	4
Raith Rovers	1914–15	Scottish First Division	33	1	—		33	1
Raith Rovers	1915–16	Scottish First Division	21	1	—		21	0
Raith Rovers	Total		84	6	2	0	86	6
St Mirren (loan)	1918–19	Scottish First Division	1	0	—		1	0
Ayr United	1918–19	Scottish First Division	7	0	—		7	0
Raith Rovers	1919–20	Scottish First Division	30	4	6	1	36	5
Raith Rovers	1920–21	Scottish First Division	10	1	—		10	1
Raith Rovers	Total		124	11	8	1	132	12
Heart of Midlothian	1920–21	Scottish First Division	18	0	5	0	23	0
Philadelphia (loan)	1921–22	American Soccer League	11	0	0	0	11	0
Career total			150	11	13	1	163	12

== Honours ==
Philadelphia

- American Soccer League: 1921–22
