= Bob Godfrey (footballer) =

Scottish footballer

Personal information
- Full name: Robert Godfrey
- Date of birth: c. 1891
- Place of birth: Larbert, Scotland
- Position: Centre half

Senior career*
Years	Team	Apps	(Gls)
- Longcroft
- Kirkintilloch Rob Roy
–1912	Banknock Juniors		
1912–1919	Falkirk	5	(0)
- → Stenhousemuir (guest)
1919–1920	Bathgate		
1920	East Stirlingshire		
–1920	Bathgate		
1920	Ayr United		
1920–	Alloa Athletic		
–1921	Ayr United		
1921–1922	Dumbarton	16	(0)
1922–	East Stirlingshire	10	(0)
–1923	St Bernard's		
1923	Clackmannan		
1923	Vale of Leven	4	(1)
- * Club domestic league appearances and goals

Robert Godfrey was a Scottish footballer who played as a centre half in the Scottish League for Dumbarton, East Stirlingshire, Falkirk and Vale of Leven.

== Personal life ==
Godfrey served as a private in McCrae's Battalion of the Royal Scots during the First World War and was medically discharged due to hammer toe.

== Honours ==
Falkirk

- Stirlingshire Consolation Cup: 1912–13

== Career statistics ==
Appearances and goals by club, season and competition
Club	Season	League			National Cup		Total	
Club	Season	Division	Apps	Goals	Apps	Goals	Apps	Goals
Falkirk	1913–14	Scottish First Division	2	0	0	0	2	0
Falkirk	1914–15	Scottish First Division	3	0	—		3	0
Falkirk	Total		5	0	0	0	5	0
Dumbarton	1921–22	Scottish First Division	16	0	0	0	16	0
East Stirlingshire	1922–23	Scottish Second Division	10	0	0	0	10	0
Vale of Leven	1922–23	Scottish Second Division	4	1	—		4	1
Career total			35	1	0	0	35	1
