= Wattie Scott =

English footballer

Personal information
- Full name: Walter Scott
- Place of birth: Blyth, England
- Date of death: 1975
- Positions: Centre half; right back

Senior career*
Years	Team	Apps	(Gls)
1913–1915	Heart of Midlothian	38	(0)
1915–1918	Raith Rovers	16	(0)
1916	→ St Bernard's (guest)		
1918–1919	Falkirk	6	(1)
- * Club domestic league appearances and goals

Walter Scott was an English footballer who played in the Scottish League for Heart of Midlothian and Falkirk as a centre half.

== Personal life ==
Scott served in McCrae's Battalion of the Royal Scots during the First World War.

== Honours ==
Heart of Midlothian

- Rosebery Charity Cup: 1913–14
- Wilson Cup: 1914–15
- Dunedin Cup: 1914–15
- East of Scotland Shield: 1913–14

== Career statistics ==
Appearances and goals by club, season and competition
Club	Season	League			National Cup		Other		Total	
Club	Season	Division	Apps	Goals	Apps	Goals	Apps	Goals	Apps	Goals
Heart of Midlothian	1912–13	Scottish First Division	2	0	0	0	0	0	2	0
Heart of Midlothian	1913–14	Scottish First Division	4	0	0	0	6 (Note: 2 appearances in Rosebery Charity Cup, 2 appearances in East of Scotland Shield, 1 appearance in Wilson Cup, 1 appearance in North Eastern Cup)	0	10	0
Heart of Midlothian	1914–15	Scottish First Division	32	0	—		6 (Note: 2 appearances in Dunedin Cup, 2 appearances in East of Scotland Shield, 1 appearance in Rosebery Charity Cup, 1 appearance in Wilson Cup)	0	38	0
Heart of Midlothian	Total		38	0	0	0	12	0	50	0
Falkirk	1918–19	Scottish First Division	6	1	—		—		6	1
Career total			44	1	0	0	12	0	56	1
