= Alex Henderson (Scottish footballer) =

Scottish footballer

Personal information
- Full name: Alexander Henderson
- Place of birth: Scotland
- Positions: Left back; left half

Senior career*
Years	Team	Apps	(Gls)
1910–1913	East Stirlingshire	68	(3)
1913–1919	Falkirk	68	(0)
–1914	→ Penicuik Juniors (loan)		
1919–1921	Alloa Athletic		
1921	→ Falkirk (loan)		
1921–1923	Dumbarton	58	(0)
- * Club domestic league appearances and goals

Alexander Henderson was a Scottish professional footballer who played in the Scottish League for East Stirlingshire, Falkirk and Dumbarton as a left back.

== Personal life ==
Henderson served as a lance corporal in McCrae's Battalion of the Royal Scots during the First World War. He was wounded during the course of his service.

== Career statistics ==
Appearances and goals by club, season and competition
Club	Season	League			National Cup		Total	
Club	Season	Division	Apps	Goals	Apps	Goals	Apps	Goals
East Stirlingshire	1909–10	Scottish Second Division	6	0	3	0	9	0
East Stirlingshire	1910–11	Scottish Second Division	21	2	11	0	32	2
East Stirlingshire	1911–12	Scottish Second Division	19	0	10	0	29	0
East Stirlingshire	1912–13	Scottish Second Division	25	1	7	0	32	1
East Stirlingshire	Total		68	3	31	0	99	3
Falkirk	1914–15	Scottish First Division	35	0	—		35	0
Falkirk	1915–16	Scottish First Division	1	0	—		1	0
Falkirk	1916–17	Scottish First Division	13	0	—		13	0
Falkirk	1917–18	Scottish First Division	1	0	—		1	0
Falkirk	1918–19	Scottish First Division	15	0	—		15	0
Falkirk	1919–20	Scottish First Division	3	0	0	0	3	0
Falkirk	Total		68	0	0	0	68	0
Dumbarton	1921–22	Scottish First Division	22	0	0	0	22	0
Dumbarton	1922–23	Scottish Second Division	36	0	1	0	37	0
Dumbarton	Total		58	0	1	0	59	0
Career total			194	3	32	0	226	3

== Honours ==
Falkirk

- Stirlingshire Consolation Cup: 1912–13
- Dewar Shield: 1913–14
- Falkirk District Charity Cup: 1913–14
- Falkirk Infirmary Shield: 1913–14, 1914–15
