= Andy Henderson (Scottish footballer) =

Scottish footballer

Personal information
- Full name: Andrew Henderson
- Date of birth: c. 1892
- Place of birth: Scotland
- Position: Goalkeeper

Youth career
- Penicuik Juniors

Senior career*
Years	Team	Apps	(Gls)
1914–1919	Falkirk	21	(0)
- * Club domestic league appearances and goals

Andrew Henderson was a Scottish professional footballer who played in the Scottish League for Falkirk as a goalkeeper.

== Personal life ==
Henderson served as a private in McCrae's Battalion of the Royal Scots during the First World War. During the course of his service, he was wounded and suffered from phosgene gas poisoning.

== Career statistics ==
Appearances and goals by club, season and competition
Club	Season	League			Scottish Cup		Total	
Club	Season	Division	Apps	Goals	Apps	Goals	Apps	Goals
Falkirk	1914–15	Scottish First Division	9	0	—		9	0
Falkirk	1918–19	Scottish First Division	12	0	—		12	0
Career total			21	0	—		21	0
