= Jimmy Morton =

Scottish footballer (1894–1916)

Personal information
- Full name: James Morton
- Date of birth: 19 January 1894
- Place of birth: Cambuslang, Scotland
- Date of death: 1 July 1916 (aged 22)
- Place of death: Sausage Redoubt, France
- Position: Inside left

Senior career*
Years	Team	Apps	(Gls)
1914–1915	Kilmarnock	4	(0)
1914–1915	→ Dunfermline Athletic (loan)		
- * Club domestic league appearances and goals

James Morton (19 January 1894 – 1 July 1916) was a Scottish footballer who played in the Scottish League for Kilmarnock as an inside left.

== Personal life ==
Morton served as a private in McCrae's Battalion of the Royal Scots during the First World War and was killed in the attack on the Sausage Redoubt on the first day on the Somme. He is commemorated on the Thiepval Memorial.

== Career statistics ==
Appearances and goals by club, season and competition
Club	Season	League			Scottish Cup		Total	
Club	Season	Division	Apps	Goals	Apps	Goals	Apps	Goals
Kilmarnock	1914–15	Scottish First Division	4	0	—		4	0
Career total			4	0	0	0	4	0
