= Willie Porter =

Willie Porter may refer to:

- Willie Porter (basketball) (born 1942), basketball power forward
- Willie Porter (English footballer) (1884–?), English footballer
- Willy Porter (born 1964), American singer-songwriter
- Willie Porter (Scottish footballer), Scottish footballer
