= Edward McGuire =

Edward McGuire may refer to:

- Eddie McGuire (born 1964), Australian television personality
- Edward McGuire (painter) (1932–1986), Irish artist
- Edward McGuire (composer) (born 1948), British composer
- Edward McGuire (politician) (1901–1992), Irish politician and tennis player
- E. J. McGuire (Edward John McGuire, 1952–2011), ice hockey coach
- Teddy McGuire, Scottish footballer
