= Jimmy Hazeldean =

Scottish footballer

Personal information
- Full name: James William Hazeldean
- Place of birth: Scotland
- Date of death: 1980
- Position: Outside left

Senior career*
Years	Team	Apps	(Gls)
1915–1919	Heart of Midlothian	5	(0)
- * Club domestic league appearances and goals

James William Hazeldean was a Scottish professional footballer who played as an outside left in the Scottish League for Heart of Midlothian.

== Personal life ==
Hazeldean served as a private in McCrae's Battalion and the Labour Corps during the First World War. He was twice wounded (including being shot in the thigh on the first day on the Somme) and was later discharged from the army. After the war, Hazeldean became a bottle blower.

== Career statistics ==
Appearances and goals by club, season and competition
Club	Season	League			Total	
Club	Season	Division	Apps	Goals	Apps	Goals
Heart of Midlothian	1915–16	Scottish First Division	5	0	5	0
Career total			5	0	5	0
