= Ernest Bannister =

English footballer

Personal information
- Date of birth: 1883
- Place of birth: Buxton, England
- Position: Forward

Senior career*
Years	Team	Apps	(Gls)
1906–1907	Buxton		
1907–1910	Manchester City	1	(0)
1910–1911	Preston North End	0	(0)
1911–1912	Port Vale	1	(0)
1912	Darlington	0	(0)
1912–1913	Heart of Midlothian	23	(4)
1913–191?	Ayr United		
- * Club domestic league appearances and goals

Ernest Bannister (born 1883; date of death unknown) was an English footballer who play one game in the Football League for Manchester City. He also spent time with Buxton, Preston North End, Port Vale, Darlington, Heart of Midlothian, and Ayr United.

== Career ==
Bannister began his career at Buxton before he joined Manchester City. He made his debut for the club against Bury at Gigg Lane on 29 February 1908. He then joined Preston North End without making a first-team appearance before he joined Port Vale in October 1911. He played one game for the club, in a 2–1 defeat to Everton Reserves in a Central League match on 28 October. He was released at the end of the 1911–12 season. He went on to play for Darlington, Heart of Midlothian, and Ayr United.

== Career statistics ==
Appearances and goals by club, season and competition
Club	Season	League			National cup (Note: Includes FA Cup, Scottish Cup)		Total	
Club	Season	Division	Apps	Goals	Apps	Goals	Apps	Goals
Manchester City	1907–08	First Division	1	0	0	0	1	0
Preston North End	1910–11	First Division	0	0	0	0	0	0
Port Vale	1911–12	Central League	1	0	0	0	1	0
Heart of Midlothian	1912–13	Scottish Division One	23	4	4	0	27	4
