= Hallwood =

Hallwood may refer to:

== Places ==
- Hallwood, Cheshire, England
- Hallwood, Virginia, USA

== People ==
- Joe Hallwood, (born 1969), English TEFL teacher
- Charles Hallwood, Scottish footballer
