= 1914–15 Heart of Midlothian F.C. season =

Heart of Midlothian
1914–1915 season
- Manager: John McCartney
- Stadium: Tynecastle Park
- Scottish First Division: 2nd

During the 1914–15 season Hearts competed in the Scottish First Division and the East of Scotland Shield.

== Fixtures ==
=== Dunedin Cup ===
| 17 August 1914 Dunedin Cup SF | Hearts | 3–2 | Falkirk | Tynecastle Park |

| 26 August 1914 Dunedin Cup Final | Hearts | 6–0 | Hibernian | Tynecastle Park |

=== Wilson Cup ===
| 1 January 1915 Wilson Cup Final | Hibernian | 1–2 | Hearts | Easter Road |

=== Rosebery Charity Cup ===
| 1 May 1915 Rosebery Charity Cup Semi-Final | Hearts | 2–3 | St Bernard's | Tynecastle Park |

=== Scottish First Division ===
| 15 August 1914 Scottish First Division | Hearts | 2–0 | Celtic | Tynecastle Park |
| | | | | Attendance: 18,500 |

| 22 August 1914 Scottish First Division | Raith Rovers | 1–3 | Hearts | Tynecastle Park |
| | | | | Attendance: 6,000 |

| 29 August 1914 Scottish First Division | Hearts | 2–0 | Third Lanark | Tynecastle Park |
| | | | | Attendance: 12,000 |

| 5 September 1914 Scottish First Division | Kilmarnock | 0–2 | Hearts | Rugby Park |
| | | | | Attendance: 4,000 |

| 12 September 1914 Scottish First Division | Hearts | 5–0 | St Mirren | Tynecastle Park |
| | | | | Attendance: 10,500 |

| 19 September 1914 Scottish First Division | Rangers | 1–2 | Hearts | Ibrox Park |
| | | | | Attendance: 41,000 |

| 26 September 1914 Scottish First Division | Hearts | 2–0 | Aberdeen | Tynecastle Park |
| | | | | Attendance: 13,500 |

| 3 October 1914 Scottish First Division | Dumbarton | 3–2 | Hearts | Boghead Park |
| | | | | Attendance: 6,000 |

| 10 October 1914 Scottish First Division | Hearts | 2–0 | Motherwell | Tynecastle Park |
| | | | | Attendance: 13,500 |

| 17 October 1914 Scottish First Division | Dundee | 1–2 | Hearts | Dens Park |
| | | | | Attendance: 12,000 |

| 24 October 1914 Scottish First Division | Hearts | 2–2 | Queen's Park | Tynecastle Park |
| | | | | Attendance: 12,000 |

| 31 October 1914 Scottish First Division | Ayr United | 0–2 | Hearts | Somerset Park |
| | | | | Attendance: 8,000 |

| 7 November 1914 Scottish First Division | Clyde | 1–2 | Hearts | Shawfield Stadium |
| | | | | Attendance: 12,000 |

| 14 November 1914 Scottish First Division | Hearts | 2–0 | Falkirk | Tynecastle Park |
| | | | | Attendance: 12,000 |

| 21 November 1914 Scottish First Division | Partick Thistle | 0–2 | Hearts | Firhill Park |
| | | | | Attendance: 14,000 |

| 28 November 1914 Scottish First Division | Hamilton Academical | 1–3 | Hearts | Douglas Park |
| | | | | Attendance: 6,000 |

| 5 December 1914 Scottish First Division | Hearts | 3–1 | Hibernian | Tynecastle Park |
| | | | | Attendance: 12,000 |

| 12 December 1914 Scottish First Division | Hearts | 3–1 | Airdrieonians | Tynecastle Park |
| | | | | Attendance: 6,000 |

| 19 December 1914 Scottish First Division | Queen's Park | 0–4 | Hearts | Hampden Park |
| | | | | Attendance: 7,000 |

| 26 December 1914 Scottish First Division | Hearts | 4–0 | Raith Rovers | Tynecastle Park |
| | | | | Attendance: 7,000 |

| 2 January 1915 Scottish First Division | Falkirk | 1–1 | Hearts | Brockville Park |
| | | | | Attendance: 6,000 |

| 4 January 1915 Scottish First Division | Hearts | 3–0 | Hamilton Academical | Tynecastle Park |
| | | | | Attendance: 5,000 |

| 9 January 1915 Scottish First Division | Hearts | 1–0 | Morton | Tynecastle Park |
| | | | | Attendance: 10,500 |

| 16 January 1915 Scottish First Division | Hearts | 3–2 | Dundee | Tynecastle Park |
| | | | | Attendance: 10,000 |

| 23 January 1915 Scottish First Division | Third Lanark | 2–2 | Hearts | Cathkin Park |
| | | | | Attendance: 18,000 |

| 30 January 1915 Scottish First Division | Celtic | 1–1 | Hearts | Celtic Park |
| | | | | Attendance: 45,000 |

| 6 February 1915 Scottish First Division | Hearts | 3–1 | Kilmarnock | Tynecastle Park |
| | | | | Attendance: 6,000 |

| 13 February 1915 Scottish First Division | Motherwell | 0–1 | Hearts | Fir Park |
| | | | | Attendance: 9,000 |

| 20 February 1915 Scottish First Division | Hearts | 3–4 | Rangers | Tynecastle Park |
| | | | | Attendance: 23,095 |

| 27 February 1915 Scottish First Division | Hibernian | 2–2 | Hearts | Easter Road |
| | | | | Attendance: 16,000 |

| 6 March 1915 Scottish First Division | Hearts | 4–1 | Dumbarton | Tynecastle Park |
| | | | | Attendance: 10,500 |

| 13 March 1915 Scottish First Division | Airdrieonians | 2–2 | Hearts | Broomfield Park |
| | | | | Attendance: 12,000 |

| 20 March 1915 Scottish First Division | Hearts | 3–1 | Partick Thistle | Tynecastle Park |
| | | | | Attendance: 8,000 |

| 27 March 1915 Scottish First Division | Hearts | 2–0 | Clyde | Tynecastle Park |
| | | | | Attendance: 10,000 |

| 3 April 1915 Scottish First Division | Aberdeen | 0–0 | Hearts | Pittodrie Park |
| | | | | Attendance: 6,000 |

| 10 April 1915 Scottish First Division | Morton | 2–0 | Hearts | Cappielow Park |
| | | | | Attendance: 7,500 |

| 17 April 1915 Scottish First Division | St Mirren | 1–0 | Hearts | St Mirren Park, Love Street |
| | | | | Attendance: 9,000 |

== See also ==
- List of Heart of Midlothian F.C. seasons
