= Charles Hallwood =

Scottish footballer

Personal information
- Full name: Charles Hallwood
- Place of birth: Scotland
- Position: Goalkeeper

Senior career*
Years	Team	Apps	(Gls)
1913–1916	Heart of Midlothian	4	(0)
1914–1915	→ Lochgelly United (loan)	23	(1)
- * Club domestic league appearances and goals

Charles Hallwood was a Scottish professional footballer who played as a goalkeeper in the Scottish League for Lochgelly United and Heart of Midlothian.

== Personal life ==
Hallwood served as a sapper in the Royal Engineers during the First World War.

== Career statistics ==
Appearances and goals by club, season and competition
Club	Season	League			Scottish Cup		Total	
Club	Season	Division	Apps	Goals	Apps	Goals	Apps	Goals
Heart of Midlothian	1912–13	Scottish First Division	2	0	0	0	2	0
Heart of Midlothian	1913–14	Scottish First Division	2	0	0	0	2	0
Heart of Midlothian	Total		4	0	0	0	4	0
Lochgelly United (loan)	1914–15	Scottish Second Division	23	1	—		23	1
Career total			27	1	0	0	27	1
