= Izatt =

Izatt is a surname. Notable people with the surname include:

- David Izatt (1892–1916), Scottish footballer
- Keith Izatt (born 1964), Canadian soccer player
- Reed McNeil Izatt (1926–2023), American professor
