= Norman Findlay =

English footballer (1890–1949)

Personal information
- Full name: Norman Findlay
- Date of birth: 1890
- Place of birth: Walker, England
- Date of death: 1949 (aged 58–59)
- Place of death: Ealing, England
- Height: 5 ft 9 in (1.75 m)
- Position: Goalkeeper

Senior career*
Years	Team	Apps	(Gls)
- Newcastle City
–1914	Blyth Spartans		
1914–1919	Heart of Midlothian	0	(0)
1915–1916	→ Walker Celtic (guest)		
1921–1926	Coventry City	9	(0)
- * Club domestic league appearances and goals

Norman Findlay (1890–1949) was an English professional footballer who played as a goalkeeper in the Football League for Coventry City.

== Personal life ==
Findlay worked as a carpenter in the shipyards. He served as a corporal in McCrae's Battalion of the Royal Scots during the First World War. Findlay was not deployed to the Western Front and was released from the army in September 1916 to work in the Newcastle shipyards. He later moved to Isleworth and worked repairing barges on the Thames.

== Career statistics ==
Appearances and goals by club, season and competition
Club	Season	League			National Cup		Total	
Club	Season	Division	Apps	Goals	Apps	Goals	Apps	Goals
Coventry City	1921–22	Second Division	2	0	0	0	2	0
Coventry City	1925–26	Third Division North	7	0	0	0	7	0
Career total			9	0	0	0	9	0
