= 1915–16 Heart of Midlothian F.C. season =

Heart of Midlothian
1915–1916 season
- Manager: John McCartney
- Stadium: Tynecastle Park
- Scottish First Division: 5th

During the 1915–16 season Hearts competed in the Scottish First Division and the East of Scotland Shield.

== Fixtures ==
=== Wilson Cup ===
1 January 1916 Wilson Cup Final	Hearts	0–2	Hibernian	Tynecastle Park

=== Rosebery Charity Cup ===
6 May 1916 Rosebery Charity Cup Semi-Final	Hearts	3–0	Leith Athletic	Tynecastle Park

13 May 1916 Rosebery Charity Cup Final	Hearts	4–0	Hibernian	Tynecastle Park

=== Scottish First Division ===
21 August 1915 Scottish Football League	St Mirren	4–1	Hearts	St Mirren Park, Love Street
				Attendance: 5,000

28 August 1915 Scottish Football League	Hearts	3–0	Hamilton Academical	Tynecastle Park
				Attendance: 5,000

4 September 1915 Scottish Football League	Partick Thistle	0–2	Hearts	Firhill Park
				Attendance: 12,000

11 September 1915 Scottish Football League	Hearts	0–1	Kilmarnock	Tynecastle Park
				Attendance: 9,000

18 September 1915 Scottish Football League	Clyde	1–4	Hearts	Shawfield Stadium
				Attendance: 8,000

20 September 1915 Scottish Football League	Hibernian	1–2	Hearts	Easter Road
				Attendance: 10,000

25 September 1915 Scottish Football League	Hearts	1–1	Airdrieonians	Tynecastle Park
				Attendance: 7,000

2 October 1915 Scottish Football League	Falkirk	1–1	Hearts	Brockville Park
				Attendance: 6,000

9 October 1915 Scottish Football League	Hearts	0–5	Ayr United	Tynecastle Park
				Attendance: 8,500

16 October 1915 Scottish Football League	Rangers	0–4	Hearts	Ibrox Park
				Attendance: 15,000

23 October 1915 Scottish Football League	Hearts	2–0	Morton	Tynecastle Park
				Attendance: 6,000

30 October 1915 Scottish Football League	Motherwell	1–3	Hearts	Fir Park
				Attendance: 6,000

6 November 1915 Scottish Football League	Dundee	1–0	Hearts	Dens Park
				Attendance: 5,500

13 November 1915 Scottish Football League	Hearts	2–0	Celtic	Tynecastle Park
				Attendance: 16,500

20 November 1915 Scottish Football League	Queen's Park	0–3	Hearts	Hampden Park
				Attendance: 3,000

27 November 1915 Scottish Football League	Hearts	3–1	Dumbarton	Tynecastle Park
				Attendance: 4,500

4 December 1915 Scottish Football League	Hearts	1–2	Aberdeen	Tynecastle Park
				Attendance: 7,000

11 December 1915 Scottish Football League	Raith Rovers	1–2	Hearts	Stark's Park
				Attendance: 1,000

18 December 1915 Scottish Football League	Hearts	4–0	Motherwell	Tynecastle Park
				Attendance: 5,500

25 December 1915 Scottish Football League	Third Lanark	1–3	Hearts	Cathkin Park
				Attendance: 10,000

8 January 1916 Scottish Football League	Ayr United	3–1	Hearts	Somerset Park
				Attendance: 5,000

15 January 1916 Scottish Football League	Hearts	3–1	St Mirren	Tynecastle Park
				Attendance: 6,000

22 January 1916 Scottish Football League	Hamilton Academical	3–2	Hearts	Douglas Park
				Attendance: 5,000

29 January 1916 Scottish Football League	Hearts	2–1	Raith Rovers	Tynecastle Park
				Attendance: 7,000

5 February 1916 Scottish Football League	Dumbarton	1–1	Hearts	Boghead Park
				Attendance: 6,000

12 February 1916 Scottish Football League	Hearts	1–2	Rangers	Tynecastle Park
				Attendance: 17,500

19 February 1916 Scottish Football League	Hearts	2–0	Third Lanark	Tynecastle Park
				Attendance: 8,000

26 February 1916 Scottish Football League	Airdrieonians	0–0	Hearts	Broomfield Park
				Attendance: 5,000

4 March 1916 Scottish Football League	Hearts	1–0	Partick Thistle	Tynecastle Park
				Attendance: 7,500

11 March 1916 Scottish Football League	Aberdeen	1–1	Hearts	Pittodrie Park
				Attendance: 4,500

18 March 1916 Scottish Football League	Hearts	0–2	Falkirk	Tynecastle Park
				Attendance: 7,500

1 April 1916 Scottish Football League	Hearts	3–1	Clyde	Tynecastle Park
				Attendance: 6,000

8 April 1916 Scottish Football League	Hearts	5–3	Queen's Park	Tynecastle Park
				Attendance: 5,000

15 April 1916 Scottish Football League	Kilmarnock	3–1	Hearts	Somerset Park
				Attendance: 3,000

17 April 1916 Scottish Football League	Hearts	1–3	Hibernian	Tynecastle Park
				Attendance: 5,000

22 April 1916 Scottish Football League	Celtic	0–0	Hearts	Celtic Park
				Attendance: 18,000

29 April 1916 Scottish Football League	Hearts	1–0	Dundee	Tynecastle Park
				Attendance: 6,500

== See also ==
- List of Heart of Midlothian F.C. seasons
