= Bobby Wood (footballer, born 1892) =

Scottish footballer (1892–1928)

Personal information
- Full name: Robert P. Wood
- Date of birth: 1892
- Place of birth: Scotland
- Date of death: August 1928 (aged 35–36)
- Place of death: Glencraig, Scotland
- Position: Inside left

Senior career*
Years	Team	Apps	(Gls)
- Glencraig Celtic
1914–1920	Falkirk	22	(10)
1920–1921	Alloa Athletic		
- * Club domestic league appearances and goals

Robert P. Wood (1892 – August 1928) was a Scottish professional footballer who played in the Scottish League for Falkirk as an inside left.

== Personal life ==
Wood served as a private in McCrae's Battalion of the Royal Scots during the First World War. He was wounded during the course of his service. Wood died in a mining accident at Glencraig Colliery in 1928.

== Career statistics ==
Appearances and goals by club, season and competition
Club	Season	League			National Cup		Total	
Club	Season	Division	Apps	Goals	Apps	Goals	Apps	Goals
Falkirk	1918–19	Scottish First Division	1	0	—		1	0
Falkirk	1919–20	Scottish First Division	21	10	0	0	21	10
Career total			22	10	0	0	22	10

== Honours ==
Falkirk

- Stirlingshire Cup: 1919–20
- Falkirk Infirmary Shield: 1914–15, 1919–20
