= Tom Gracie =

Scottish footballer (1889–1915)

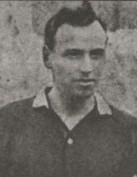

Personal information
- Date of birth: 12 June 1889
- Place of birth: Glasgow, Scotland
- Date of death: 23 October 1915 (aged 26)
- Place of death: Glasgow, Scotland
- Position: Centre forward

Youth career
- Shawfield
- –1907: Strathclyde

Senior career*
Years	Team	Apps	(Gls)
1907–1910	Airdrieonians	12	(3)
1908–1909	→ Hamilton Academical (loan)	5	(1)
1909–1910	→ Arthurlie (loan)	16	(11)
1910–1911	Morton	28	(22)
1911–1912	Everton	13	(1)
1912–1914	Liverpool	33	(5)
1914–1915	Heart of Midlothian	37	(29)

International career
1914	Scottish League XI	1	(1)
- * Club domestic league appearances and goals

Thomas Gracie (12 June 1889 – 23 October 1915) was a Scottish professional footballer and, latterly, a corporal in the 16th Battalion of The Royal Scots. He was the joint-leading scorer in the Scottish Football League in the 1914–15 season.

== Career ==
He was born at 40 Edmund Street in Dennistoun, Glasgow, the son of Robert Gracie (1848-1911), flesher, and his wife, Harriet Bell (1854-1921).

Gracie studied bookkeeping upon leaving school before finding work as a meat salesman. He played Junior football for Shawfield, then Strathclyde, but in 1907 he was offered the chance to move into League football when approached by Airdrieonians, third-placed finishers the previous season. After short spells with Hamilton Academical and Arthurlie, he joined Morton in 1910.

In 1911, Gracie was selected as a reserve for Scotland's game against England at Goodison Park. Although he was not required to play, and would never gain an international cap, the journey proved profitable for him as he was signed by Everton at the game's conclusion. A season later he switched to the red half of Merseyside, signing for Liverpool in an exchange deal which saw Harold Uren move to Everton in exchange for Gracie and Bill Lacey. Unlike Lacey, however, Gracie was unable to establish himself in the Liverpool first team, making only sporadic appearances in his two and a half seasons at Anfield. When the opportunity arose to return to Scotland in 1914, he was glad to take it, admitting to feeling "unappreciated" in the south.

Gracie's destination was Hearts, manager John McCartney paying £400 for him as a replacement for the recently sold Percy Dawson. The Maroons were a rapidly emerging side and started the 1914–15 season with eight straight victories, including a 2–0 defeat of reigning champions Celtic in which Gracie scored, to become early league-leaders and title-favourites. Gracie was selected for the Scottish League XI in November 1914.

=== First World War ===
However, this streak coincided with the start of the First World War and the beginnings of a public debate upon the morality of continuing professional football while young soldiers were dying on the front-line. A motion was placed before the Scottish Football Association to postpone the season, with one of its backers, Airdrieonians chairman Thomas Forsyth declaring that "playing football while our men are fighting is repugnant". While this motion was defeated at the ballot box, with the SFA opting to wait for War Office advice, the noted East London philanthropist Frederick Charringtonn was orchestrating a public campaign to have professional football in Britain suspended, and achieving great popular support for his cause. The prime tactic of Charrington's campaign was to shame footballing players and officials into action through public and private denouncement, and as Gracie was then the leading scorer in the side leading the top division in Scotland, he was an obvious target for the anti-football crusade, much to his distress.

Gracie's response, and that of 10 of his team-mates, was to enlist in Sir George McCrae's new volunteer battalion, joining en masse on 25 November 1914. The battalion was Edinburgh's second pals battalion and was to become the 16th Royal Scots and was the first to earn the "footballer's battalion" sobriquet. Military training was thus added to the Hearts players football training regime, although this did not initially stop the side's progress, as they compiled a 20-game unbeaten run between October and February.

However, exhaustion from their army exertions, twice including 10-hour nocturnal-marches the night before a league game, eventually led to a drop in form, as several enlisted players, including Gracie, missed key games. Defeats to St Mirren and Morton allowed Celtic to usurp the Maroons and eventually claim the league title by 4 points. For Gracie, finishing as the league's joint top-scorer, tied on 29 goals with Ayr United's James Richardson was scant consolation.

=== Illness and death ===
Gracie however faced a far more serious problem – in March 1915 he was diagnosed with leukemia, a prognosis he had shared only with manager McCartney. Despite his illness and against medical recommendation he decided to continue to play with Hearts and train with his battalion, and indeed scored 4 times during that month. He was still with the battalion when they were sent south to Ripon in June for further training but within weeks he had succumbed to fatigue and was committed to hospital in Leeds for treatment, before being transferred back to Scotland.

Gracie died on 23 October 1915 in Stobhill Hospital in his hometown Glasgow and was buried at Craigton Cemetery (plot P 107). His death concluded a dark year for the Gracie family, who had also lost Tom's brother John and brother-in-law Tommy during 1915's hostilities.
