= 1913–14 Heart of Midlothian F.C. season =

Heart of Midlothian
1913–14 season
- Manager: John McCartney
- Stadium: Tynecastle Park
- Scottish First Division: 3rd
- Scottish Cup: 1st Round

During the 1913–14 season Hearts competed in the Scottish First Division, the Scottish Cup and the East of Scotland Shield.

== Fixtures ==
=== Dunedin Cup ===
18 August 1913 Dunedin Cup R1	Leith Athletic	1–6	Hearts	Old Logie Green

27 August 1913 Dunedin Cup SF	Hearts	1–2	Falkirk	Tynecastle Park

=== Wilson Cup ===
1 January 1914 Wilson Cup Final	Hearts	1–1	Hibernian	Tynecastle Park

20 April 1914 Wilson Cup Final	Hibernian	0–1	Hearts	Easter Road

=== Rosebery Charity Cup ===
2 May 1914 Rosebery Charity Cup Semi-Final	Hearts	2–0	St Bernard's	Tynecastle Park

9 May 1914 Rosebery Charity Cup Final	Hibernian	2–3	Hearts	Easter Road

=== Scottish Cup ===
7 February 1914 Scottish Cup R1	Raith Rovers	2–0	Hearts	Stark's Park
				Attendance: 21,000

=== Scottish First Division ===
16 August 1913 Scottish First Division	Hearts	3–1	Airdrieonians	Tynecastle Park
				Attendance: 16,500

23 August 1913 Scottish First Division	Ayr United	0–4	Hearts	Somerset Park
				Attendance: 8,000

30 August 1913 Scottish First Division	Hearts	1–0	Queen's Park	Tynecastle Park
				Attendance: 6,500

6 September 1913 Scottish First Division	Falkirk	0–1	Hearts	Brockville Park
				Attendance: 7,000

13 September 1913 Scottish First Division	Hearts	2–1	Rangers	Tynecastle Park
				Attendance: 15,500

15 September 1913 Scottish First Division	Hearts	2–0	Celtic	Tynecastle Park
				Attendance: 16,500

20 September 1913 Scottish First Division	Clyde	2–2	Hearts	Shawfield Stadium
				Attendance: 6,000

27 September 1913 Scottish First Division	Hearts	4–0	Morton	Tynecastle Park
				Attendance: 18,500

4 October 1913 Scottish First Division	Raith Rovers	0–0	Hearts	Stark's Park
				Attendance: 12,000

11 October 1913 Scottish First Division	Hearts	1–0	Partick Thistle	Tynecastle Park
				Attendance: 13,500

18 October 1913 Scottish First Division	Hamilton Academical	1–3	Hearts	Douglas Park
				Attendance: 12,000

25 October 1913 Scottish First Division	Hearts	0–0	Third Lanark	Tynecastle Park
				Attendance: 18,000

1 November 1913 Scottish First Division	St Mirren	1–0	Hearts	St Mirren Park, Love Street
				Attendance: 10,000

8 November 1913 Scottish First Division	Hibernian	1–2	Hearts	Easter Road
				Attendance: 21,000

15 November 1913 Scottish First Division	Hearts	6–0	St Mirren	Tynecastle Park
				Attendance: 17,000

22 November 1913 Scottish First Division	Dundee	2–2	Hearts	Dens Park
				Attendance: 16,000

29 November 1913 Scottish First Division	Hearts	4–0	Aberdeen	Tynecastle Park
				Attendance: 13,000

6 December 1913 Scottish First Division	Hearts	2–1	Motherwell	Tynecastle Park
				Attendance: 12,000

13 December 1913 Scottish First Division	Kilmarnock	0–3	Hearts	Rugby Park
				Attendance: 6,000

20 December 1913 Scottish First Division	Hearts	1–0	Clyde	Tynecastle Park
				Attendance: 11,500

27 December 1913 Scottish First Division	Airdrieonians	2–2	Hearts	Broomfield Park
				Attendance: 4,000

3 January 1914 Scottish First Division	Hearts	2–1	Ayr United	Tynecastle Park
				Attendance: 18,000

10 January 1914 Scottish First Division	Aberdeen	0–1	Hearts	Pittodrie Park
				Attendance: 5,000

17 January 1914 Scottish First Division	Dumbarton	2–1	Hearts	Boghead Park
				Attendance: 6,000

24 January 1914 Scottish First Division	Hearts	3–0	Dundee	Tynecastle Park
				Attendance: 16,000

31 January 1914 Scottish First Division	Queen's Park	1–1	Hearts	Hampden Park
				Attendance: 25,000

14 February 1914 Scottish First Division	Hearts	3–1	Hibernian	Tynecastle Park
				Attendance: 16,000

21 February 1914 Scottish First Division	Morton	3–0	Hearts	Cappielow Park
				Attendance: 10,000

28 February 1914 Scottish First Division	Hearts	1–0	Hamilton Academical	Tynecastle Park
				Attendance: 10,500

7 March 1914 Scottish First Division	Hearts	0–1	Kilmarnock	Tynecastle Park
				Attendance: 9,000

21 March 1914 Scottish First Division	Hearts	1–0	Falkirk	Tynecastle Park
				Attendance: 8,000

24 March 1914 Scottish First Division	Celtic	0–0	Hearts	Celtic Park
				Attendance: 30,000

28 March 1914 Scottish First Division	Partick Thistle	2–1	Hearts	Firhill Park
				Attendance: 12,000

1 April 1914 Scottish First Division	Motherwell	0–2	Hearts	Fir Park
				Attendance: 4,000

4 April 1914 Scottish First Division	Hearts	5–1	Dumbarton	Tynecastle Park
				Attendance: 6,500

11 April 1914 Scottish First Division	Third Lanark	2–1	Hearts	Cathkin Park
				Attendance: 7,000

18 April 1914 Scottish First Division	Hearts	2–0	Raith Rovers	Tynecastle Park
				Attendance: 7,000

25 April 1914 Scottish First Division	Rangers	3–2	Hearts	Ibrox Park
				Attendance: 12,000

== See also ==
- List of Heart of Midlothian F.C. seasons
