= Walter Scott of Buccleuch =

Walter Scott of Buccleuch is the name of several successive Lords of Buccleuch in the Scottish border country:

- Sir Walter Scott of Buccleuch (d. 1469)
- Sir Walter Scott of Branxholme and Buccleuch (murdered 1552)
- Sir Walter Scott, 4th Baron of Buccleuch (d. 1574)
- Sir Walter Scott, 1st Lord Scott of Buccleuch, the "Bold Buccleuch" (1565–1611)
- Sir Walter Scott, 1st Earl of Buccleuch, (d. 1633), created Earl of Buccleuch in 1619

== See also ==
- Duke of Buccleuch
- Clan Scott
- Walter Scott (disambiguation)
