= Teddy McGuire =

Scottish footballer

Personal information
- Full name: Edward M. McGuire
- Date of birth: 12 August 1893
- Place of birth: Whiterigg, Scotland
- Position: Inside right

Senior career*
| Years | Team | Apps | (Gls) |
| 1915–1918 | Heart of Midlothian | 2 | (1) |
- * Club domestic league appearances and goals

Edward M. McGuire was a Scottish professional footballer who played in the Scottish League for Heart of Midlothian as an inside right.

== Personal life ==
McGuire served as a private in the Royal Scots during the First World War. He was wounded in the arm by flying shrapnel on the first day on the Somme and as he fell, a machine gun bullet grazed his head. McGuire was later invalided out of the army.

== Career statistics ==
Appearances and goals by club, season and competition
| Club | Season | League | | | National Cup | | Other | | Total | |
| Club | Season | Division | Apps | Goals | Apps | Goals | Apps | Goals | Apps | Goals |
|---|---|---|---|---|---|---|---|---|---|---|
| Heart of Midlothian | 1915–16 | Scottish First Division | 2 | 1 | — | | 1 (Note: Appearance in Wilson Cup) | 0 | 3 | 1 |
| Career total | | | 2 | 1 | — | | 1 | 0 | 3 | 1 |
