= James M. Todd =

American engineer (1896–1970)

James Mulherrin Todd (May 25, 1896 – 1970) was an American electrical and consulting engineer in New Orleans, and 68th president of the American Society of Mechanical Engineers in 1949-50.

== Biography ==
=== Youth and early career ===
Born in Franklin, Louisiana, in 1896 to John Robert Todd and Fannie Louise (Mayer) Todd. He attended the public schools of New Orleans and Tulane University, where he obtained his BSc in electrical engineering in 1918. He then served in World War I. In 1930 he also obtained his MA in engineering from Tulane.

In 1919 started his career as chief engineer at the Marrero plant of Penick & Ford ltd. in New Orleans. In 1922–1923 he was a mechanical engineer with in the consultancy practice of William H. Ennis, and from 1923 to 1928 he was associate of A.M. Lockett and Co., mechanical engineering contractors of New Orleans.

=== Further career and recognition ===
In 1928 Todd started his own consultancy firm in the fields of mining, mechanical and electrical engineering. One of his first assignments was taking charge of engineering at the Jefferson Lake Sulphur Company. Furthermore Todd was "active in the installation of air conditioning in the South; the development of the sulfur industry in Louisiana, Texas, and Mexico; the drafting of the New Orleans building code; and he designed the plumbing, electrical, and mechanical facilities of many buildings in New Orleans and the Gulf South."

In 1930 Todd served as president of the Louisiana Engineering Society, in 1948 as president of the American Society of Mechanical Engineers, and also as vice-president of the Union of Pan-American Engineering Societies. He was Fellow of the IEEE, and the ASME, and in 1969 Todd was made an honorary member of ASME.

== Selected publications ==
- Todd, James M. "Offshore Sulfur Production." Industrial & Engineering Chemistry 42.11 (1950): 2210-2211.
