= Jimmy Todd (Scottish footballer) =

Scottish footballer

Personal information
- Full name: James Colin Todd
- Date of birth: 1896
- Place of birth: Edinburgh, Scotland
- Date of death: 12 March 1916 (aged 20)
- Place of death: near Armentières, France
- Position: Outside forward

Senior career*
Years	Team	Apps	(Gls)
–1914	Musselburgh		
1914–1915	Raith Rovers	22	(1)
- * Club domestic league appearances and goals

James Colin Todd (1896 – 12 March 1916) was a Scottish professional footballer who played in the Scottish League for Raith Rovers as an outside forward.

== Personal life ==
Todd worked as a railway clerk. After the outbreak of the First World War in August 1914, Todd enlisted as a private in the McCrae's Battalion of the Royal Scots. He was hit in the chest by shell fragments near Armentières, France on 12 March 1916 and died in a dugout shortly after, becoming the first footballer of the battalion to be killed in the war. He was buried in Erquinghem-Lys Churchyard Extension.

== Honours ==
- Raith Rovers Hall of Fame
