= Walter Scott (Australian cricketer) =

Australian cricketer

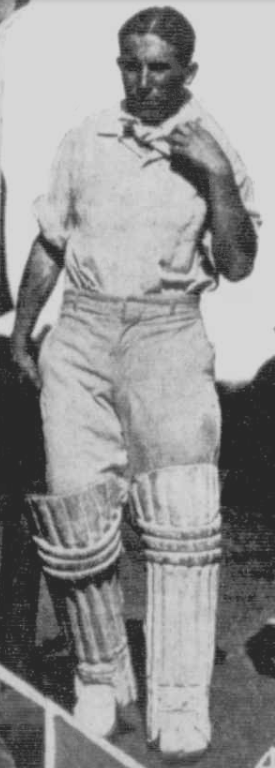

Personal information
- Full name: Walter Aubrey Scott
- Born: 19 February 1907; Camberwell, Victoria
- Died: 23 October 1989 (aged 82); Australia
- Batting: Right-handed
- Role: Batsman

Domestic team information
- Years: Team
- 1930: Victoria

Career statistics
| Competition | FC |
|---|---|
| Matches | 1 |
| Runs scored | 21 |
| Batting average | 21.00 |
| 100s/50s | 0/0 |
| Top score | 21 |
| Catches/stumpings | 1/– |
- Source: CricketArchive, 6 August 2013

Walter Aubrey Scott (19 February 1907 – 23 October 1989) was an Australian cricketer who played a single first-class match for Victoria during the 1929–30 season. A right-handed batsman from Melbourne, Scott's sole match at first-class level came against Tasmania in February 1930, at the Melbourne Cricket Ground. Victoria scored 451 runs in its only innings to win by an innings and 95 runs, with Scott contributing 21 runs opening the batting with the team's captain, Edward Tolhurst. Aged 22 at the time of his debut, he did not play again at first-class level, but played two further matches for Victoria Country—against the touring South Africans during the 1931–32 season and against the touring MCC side the season after. Scott died in October 1989, aged 82.

== See also ==
- List of Victoria first-class cricketers
