= Harold Sparkes =

English footballer (1896–1917)

Personal information
- Full name: Harold Sparkes
- Date of birth: 1896
- Place of birth: Glossop, England
- Date of death: 3 June 1917 (aged 21)
- Place of death: near Arras, France
- Position: Centre forward

Senior career*
| Years | Team | Apps | (Gls) |
| 1915 | Glossop | 3 | (0) |
- * Club domestic league appearances and goals

Harold Sparkes (1896 – 3 June 1917) was an English amateur footballer who played as a centre forward in the Football League for Glossop.

== Personal life ==
Sparkes took an apprenticeship as a plumber and later worked as a clerk. On 11 June 1915, 10 months after the outbreak of the First World War, he enlisted as a private in the Royal Scots. After being posted to France in October 1915, he saw action at the Battle of Loos and later suffered a gunshot wound to the head near Ploegsteert, Belgium on 12 May 1916. After recovering in Britain, he returned to the Western Front in December 1916. Sparkes was killed east of Arras, France on 3 June 1917, during the Battle of Arleux. He is commemorated on the Arras Memorial.

== Career statistics ==
Appearances and goals by club, season and competition
| Club | Season | League | | | FA Cup | | Total | |
| Club | Season | Division | Apps | Goals | Apps | Goals | Apps | Goals |
|---|---|---|---|---|---|---|---|---|
| Glossop | 1914–15 | Second Division | 3 | 0 | 0 | 0 | 3 | 0 |
| Career total | | | 3 | 0 | 0 | 0 | 3 | 0 |
