= Walter P. Scott =

Scottish footballer

Walter Scott
Personal information
- Full name: Walter P. Scott
- Place of birth: Scotland
- Position: Goalkeeper

Senior career*
Years	Team	Apps	(Gls)
1910–1914	Queen's Park	1	(0)
- * Club domestic league appearances and goals

Walter P. Scott was a Scottish amateur footballer who made one appearance as a goalkeeper in the Scottish League for Queen's Park.

== Personal life ==
Scott served as a captain in the Argyll and Sutherland Highlanders during the First World War.

== Career statistics ==
Appearances and goals by club, season and competition
Club	Season	League			Scottish Cup		Total	
Club	Season	Division	Apps	Goals	Apps	Goals	Apps	Goals
Queen's Park	1910–11	Scottish League First Division	1	0	0	0	1	0
Career total			1	0	0	0	1	0
