= James Todd (boxer) =

Wales boxer

James Todd, alias The Sandman, is a welterweight professional boxer from Swansea, Wales.

== Professional career ==
Todd made his professional debut against another debuting fighter, Adam Cummings, in December 2008, which was judged by the referee as a draw. Todd won his next two bouts, against 7-82-2 Jason Nesbitt and 0-1 Adam Farrell, before traveling to the US to further his career. There Todd faced amateur standout Dean Peters Jr. and lost by unanimous decision. On interview with Todd he felt that he was “robbed” and that the decision of all judges were wrong.

On 20 October 2009 it was announced that Todd would get a surprise shot at a minor world title, the IBA welterweight belt. Todd's opponent Mohammed Kayongo (14-2 with 10 knockouts) won with a fourth-round TKO.

Todd took a three-year break, then teamed up with a new trainer Darren Pullman in Swansea. Todd made a comeback fight on 7 June 2013 against debuting fighter Lee Boyce in Echo Arena, Liverpool, Merseyside, United Kingdom on the Dave Price versus Tony Thomas undercard. Todd won the fight on points against Lee boyce referee Mark Lyson scored the fight 40-38 to Todd.

Todd took a two-year break out of the ring, before teaming up with Gary Lockett. Todd had the opportunity to fight on the under card of Enzo Maccarinelli In Newport, United Kingdom. Todd went on to beat Mick Mills winning on points 40–36.
