= 1912–13 Heart of Midlothian F.C. season =

Heart of Midlothian
1912–13 season
- Manager: John McCartney
- Stadium: Tynecastle Park
- Scottish First Division: 3rd
- Scottish Cup: Semi-final

During the 1912–13 season Hearts competed in the Scottish First Division, the Scottish Cup and the East of Scotland Shield.

== Fixtures ==
=== Dunedin Cup ===
15 August 1912 Dunedin Cup R1	St Bernard's	1–1	Hearts	Royal Gymnasium Ground

20 August 1912 Dunedin Cup R1 Replay	Hearts	5–0	St Bernard's	Tynecastle Park

22 August 1912 Dunedin Cup SF	Hearts	3–0	Falkirk	Tynecastle Park

28 August 1912 Dunedin Cup Final	Hearts	1–0	Hibernian	Tynecastle Park

=== North Eastern Cup ===
14 September 1912 North Eastern Cup SF	Hearts	4–0	Aberdeen	Tynecastle Park

2 January 1913 North Eastern Cup Final	Hearts	3–0	Falkirk	Tynecastle Park

=== Wilson Cup ===
1 January 1913 Wilson Cup Final	Hibernian	3–2	Hearts	Easter Road

=== Rosebery Charity Cup ===
3 May 1913 Rosebery Charity Cup SF	Hearts	3–2	St Bernard's	Tynecastle Park

10 May 1913 Rosebery Charity Cup Final	Hearts	0–2	Hibernian	Tynecastle Park

=== Scottish Cup ===
8 February 1913 Scottish Cup R2	Hearts	3–1	Dunfermline Athletic	Tynecastle Park
				Attendance: 22,928

22 February 1913 Scottish Cup R3	Kilmarnock	0–2	Hearts	Rugby Park
				Attendance: 16,000

8 March 1913 Scottish Cup R4	Celtic	0–1	Hearts	Celtic Park
				Attendance: 66,000

29 March 1913 Scottish Cup SF	Falkirk	1–0	Hearts	Ibrox Park
				Attendance: 55,000

=== Scottish First Division ===
17 August 1912 Scottish First Division	Clyde	0–0	Hearts	Shawfield Stadium
				Attendance: 12,000

23 August 1912 Scottish First Division	Hearts	10–3	Queen's Park	Tynecastle Park
				Attendance: 12,000

31 August 1912 Scottish First Division	Motherwell	1–2	Hearts	Fir Park
				Attendance: 3,000

7 September 1912 Scottish First Division	Hearts	1–1	Airdrieonians	Tynecastle Park
				Attendance: 14,500

21 September 1912 Scottish First Division	Rangers	2–4	Hearts	Ibrox Park
				Attendance: 50,000

28 September 1912 Scottish First Division	Hearts	1–0	Hibernian	Tynecastle Park
				Attendance: 20,500

5 October 1912 Scottish First Division	Falkirk	2–0	Hearts	Brockville Park
				Attendance: 11,000

12 October 1912 Scottish First Division	Hearts	1–2	Third Lanark	Tynecastle Park
				Attendance: 13,500

19 October 1912 Scottish First Division	Aberdeen	0–1	Hearts	Pittodrie Park
				Attendance: 9,000

26 October 1912 Scottish First Division	Hearts	5–0	Kilmarnock	Tynecastle Park
				Attendance: 9,500

2 November 1912 Scottish First Division	Hearts	4–0	Partick Thistle	Tynecastle Park
				Attendance: 8,000

9 November 1912 Scottish First Division	Celtic	1–0	Hearts	Celtic Park
				Attendance: 13,000

16 November 1912 Scottish First Division	Hearts	2–0	St Mirren	Tynecastle Park
				Attendance: 11,000

23 November 1912 Scottish First Division	Airdrieonians	1–0	Hearts	Broomfield Park
				Attendance: 6,000

30 November 1912 Scottish First Division	Hearts	6–0	Raith Rovers	Tynecastle Park
				Attendance: 17,000

7 December 1912 Scottish First Division	Partick Thistle	1–3	Hearts	Firhill Park
				Attendance: 15,000

14 December 1912 Scottish First Division	Dundee	3–0	Hearts	Dens Park
				Attendance: 6,000

21 December 1912 Scottish First Division	Hearts	0–0	Hamilton Academical	Tynecastle Park
				Attendance: 6,000

28 December 1912 Scottish First Division	Kilmarnock	2–2	Hearts	Rugby Park
				Attendance: 4,000

4 January 1913 Scottish First Division	Hearts	3–2	Clyde	Tynecastle Park
				Attendance: 13,000

11 January 1913 Scottish First Division	Hamilton Academical	4–2	Hearts	Douglas Park
				Attendance: 3,000

18 January 1913 Scottish First Division	Raith Rovers	3–3	Hearts	Stark's Park
				Attendance: 5,000

25 January 1913 Scottish First Division	St Mirren	2–1	Hearts	St Mirren Park, Love Street
				Attendance: 7,000

1 February 1913 Scottish First Division	Hearts	4–1	Aberdeen	Tynecastle Park
				Attendance: 8,000

15 February 1913 Scottish First Division	Queen's Park	1–6	Hearts	Hampden Park
				Attendance: 8,000

1 March 1913 Scottish First Division	Morton	1–2	Hearts	Cappielow Park
				Attendance: 5,000

15 March 1913 Scottish First Division	Hearts	1–1	Rangers	Tynecastle Park
				Attendance: 18,000

22 March 1913 Scottish First Division	Hearts	4–3	Dundee	Tynecastle Park
				Attendance: 13,000

5 April 1913 Scottish First Division	Third Lanark	1–0	Hearts	Cathkin Park
				Attendance: 5,000

12 April 1913 Scottish First Division	Hearts	4–2	Morton	Tynecastle Park
				Attendance: 5,500

16 April 1913 Scottish First Division	Hibernian	0–3	Hearts	Easter Road
				Attendance: 4,000

21 April 1913 Scottish First Division	Hearts	0–0	Celtic	Tynecastle Park
				Attendance: 10,000

23 April 1913 Scottish First Division	Hearts	0–2	Falkirk	Tynecastle Park
				Attendance: 4,500

26 April 1913 Scottish First Division	Hearts	0–1	Motherwell	Tynecastle Park
				Attendance: 5,000

=== Inter City Midweek League ===
16 October 1912 Inter City Midweek League	Dundee	3–1	Hearts	Dens Park

23 October 1912 Inter City Midweek League	Hearts	3–0	Rangers	Tynecastle Park

30 October 1912 Inter City Midweek League	Hearts	1–0	Aberdeen	Tynecastle Park

6 November 1912 Inter City Midweek League	Hibernian	2–0	Hearts	Easter Road

== See also ==
- List of Heart of Midlothian F.C. seasons
