= David Izatt =

Scottish footballer

Personal information
- Full name: David Heron Izatt
- Date of birth: 1892
- Place of birth: Dunfermline, Scotland
- Date of death: 1 July 1916 (aged 24)
- Place of death: Somme, France
- Position: Half back

Senior career*
Years	Team	Apps	(Gls)
1912–1915	Dunfermline Athletic	62	(7)
- * Club domestic league appearances and goals

David Heron Izatt (1892 – 1 July 1916) was a Scottish professional footballer who played in the Scottish League for Dunfermline Athletic as a half back.

== Personal life ==
Izatt was a plumber by trade. Soon after the outbreak of the First World War in August 1914, he enlisted as a private in the Royal Scots. Izatt was killed in Sausage Valley on the first day of the Somme and is commemorated on the Thiepval Memorial.
