= 1911–12 Scottish Division One =

19th season of top-tier football league in Scotland

Scottish Division One
- Season: 1911–12
- Champions: Rangers

The 1911–12 Scottish Division One season was won by Rangers by six points over nearest rival Celtic.

== League table ==
Pos	Team	Pld	W	D	L	GF	GA	GD	Pts
1	Rangers (C)	34	24	3	7	86	34	+52	51
2	Celtic	34	17	11	6	58	33	+25	45
3	Clyde	34	19	4	11	56	32	+24	42
4	Heart of Midlothian	34	16	8	10	54	40	+14	40
5	Partick Thistle	34	16	8	10	47	40	+7	40
6	Morton	34	14	9	11	44	44	0	37
7	Falkirk	34	15	6	13	46	33	+13	36
8	Dundee	34	13	9	12	52	41	+11	35
9	Aberdeen	34	14	7	13	44	44	0	35
10	Airdrieonians	34	12	8	14	40	41	−1	32
11	Third Lanark	34	12	7	15	40	57	−17	31
12	Hamilton Academical	34	11	8	15	32	44	−12	30
13	Hibernian	34	12	5	17	44	47	−3	29
14	Motherwell	34	11	5	18	34	44	−10	27
15	Raith Rovers	34	9	9	16	39	59	−20	27
16	Kilmarnock	34	11	4	19	38	60	−22	26
17	Queen's Park	34	8	9	17	29	53	−24	25
18	St Mirren	34	7	10	17	32	59	−27	24

Source: "1911-1912 Division 1 - SPFL Archive". SPFL.
(C) Champions

== Results ==
Home \ Away	ABE	AIR	CEL	CLY	DND	FAL	HAM	HOM	HIB	KIL	MOR	MOT	PAR	QPA	RAI	RAN	STM	THI
Aberdeen		3–0	1–1	0–0	2–1	1–0	2–0	1–0	1–1	1–2	1–2	0–1	3–1	3–0	3–1	1–2	2–1	1–2
Airdrieonians	3–0		0–0	0–1	0–0	2–1	1–1	2–0	1–0	1–0	0–1	1–0	1–2	4–2	5–1	2–2	1–2	1–1
Celtic	1–0	3–0		3–2	2–0	3–1	2–1	1–1	3–1	2–0	1–1	2–0	3–0	2–1	1–1	3–0	3–1	3–1
Clyde	0–1	2–1	1–1		3–0	1–2	3–0	1–2	1–0	3–1	1–0	1–2	2–1	0–1	2–0	0–2	3–0	1–0
Dundee	4–0	1–1	3–1	2–0		1–1	2–0	1–1	3–2	5–2	0–3	3–1	0–2	4–0	2–2	2–1	4–0	3–1
Falkirk	3–0	2–1	1–1	2–1	0–0		1–0	2–2	1–0	2–0	2–1	1–3	0–1	3–1	0–3	0–2	3–1	7–0
Hamilton Academical	1–1	1–2	1–0	0–0	0–1	1–3		1–1	3–0	4–0	3–1	1–0	0–3	2–1	0–1	1–1	1–0	1–1
Heart of Midlothian	1–2	2–1	2–1	1–0	1–4	0–2	2–0		3–0	1–1	2–0	2–1	2–1	0–0	2–0	2–1	1–2	4–0
Hibernian	1–1	2–1	1–1	1–2	2–1	5–0	1–0	0–4		0–1	1–2	1–0	4–0	2–0	3–0	5–0	0–0	3–2
Kilmarnock	3–0	2–1	0–2	1–3	1–0	1–0	2–3	1–3	1–2		1–0	1–1	0–1	1–2	3–1	3–2	1–1	0–0
Morton	2–1	1–0	1–1	1–3	4–2	2–1	3–1	2–2	2–1	2–0		0–2	2–0	2–2	0–1	2–1	1–0	0–1
Motherwell	2–0	0–0	3–2	2–3	0–0	2–0	0–2	0–3	0–2	0–1	0–1		1–2	1–0	3–0	1–2	3–2	2–1
Partick Thistle	3–1	1–2	1–1	1–0	2–0	0–0	0–0	2–2	3–0	3–1	1–1	1–0		2–1	2–2	0–1	0–0	2–2
Queen's Park	2–5	2–1	1–4	2–2	1–0	0–2	0–0	0–3	2–0	1–0	1–1	1–1	0–1		2–1	0–0	2–0	1–1
Raith Rovers	1–1	0–1	1–2	0–5	1–1	1–0	1–2	3–1	2–2	3–2	1–1	3–0	3–2	0–0		0–1	1–1	4–0
Rangers	2–0	2–1	3–1	1–2	2–1	4–0	7–0	2–1	2–0	6–1	6–1	3–1	4–1	1–0	5–0		4–0	4–0
St Mirren	1–3	1–1	1–1	0–2	1–1	1–1	0–1	2–0	2–1	2–4	1–1	1–0	0–3	2–0	2–0	1–5		1–1
Third Lanark	0–2	0–1	1–0	1–5	1–0	1–2	1–0	3–0	2–0	2–0	3–1	1–1	1–2	2–0	2–0	1–3	4–2	

Legend: Blue = home team win; Yellow = draw; Red = away team win.
