= 1912–13 Scottish Division One =

20th season of top-tier football league in Scotland

Scottish Division One
- Season: 1912–13
- Champions: Rangers

The 1912–13 Scottish Division One season was won by Rangers by four points over nearest rival Celtic.

== League table ==
Pos	Team	Pld	W	D	L	GF	GA	GD	Pts
1	Rangers (C)	34	24	5	5	76	41	+35	53
2	Celtic	34	22	5	7	53	28	+25	49
=3	Heart of Midlothian	34	17	7	10	71	43	+28	41
=3	Airdrieonians	34	15	11	8	64	46	+18	41
5	Falkirk	34	14	12	8	56	38	+18	40
=6	Hibernian	34	16	5	13	63	54	+9	37
=6	Motherwell	34	12	13	9	47	39	+8	37
=6	Aberdeen	34	14	9	11	47	40	+7	37
9	Clyde	34	13	9	12	41	44	−3	35
10	Hamilton Academical	34	12	8	14	44	47	−3	32
11	Kilmarnock	34	10	11	13	37	54	−17	31
12	St Mirren	34	10	10	14	50	60	−10	30
=13	Dundee	34	8	13	13	33	46	−13	29
=13	Morton	34	11	7	16	50	59	−9	29
15	Third Lanark	34	8	12	14	31	41	−10	28
16	Raith Rovers	34	8	10	16	46	60	−14	26
17	Partick Thistle	34	10	4	20	40	55	−15	24
18	Queen's Park	34	5	3	26	34	88	−54	13

Source: "1912-1913 Division 1 - SPFL Archive". SPFL.
(C) Champions

== Results ==
Home \ Away	ABE	AIR	CEL	CLY	DND	FAL	HAM	HOM	HIB	KIL	MOR	MOT	PAR	QPA	RAI	RAN	STM	THI
Aberdeen		4–1	3–0	0–1	1–0	2–2	2–0	0–1	1–3	0–0	0–0	2–2	3–1	4–0	2–0	1–3	4–0	2–0
Airdrieonians	1–1		1–4	2–3	1–1	5–1	4–0	1–0	1–0	3–2	5–1	1–1	2–0	4–3	0–1	3–0	2–2	3–2
Celtic	2–0	1–1		3–0	2–0	1–2	2–1	1–0	1–1	4–1	1–0	1–2	1–0	1–1	4–1	3–2	2–1	2–0
Clyde	0–1	0–0	1–1		2–2	0–0	2–1	0–0	2–0	0–0	0–1	3–2	1–0	3–0	1–0	0–1	2–2	1–1
Dundee	1–3	1–1	3–1	1–3		2–2	2–1	3–0	2–2	0–0	0–1	0–0	1–0	1–0	1–0	0–0	0–0	1–0
Falkirk	3–1	2–3	0–0	0–2	2–0		6–0	2–0	0–2	0–0	2–1	1–1	2–0	3–1	0–1	2–0	2–0	2–2
Hamilton Academical	3–0	1–3	0–1	0–1	1–0	0–0		4–2	3–1	3–1	3–1	0–0	2–0	2–1	4–0	0–2	3–1	0–0
Heart of Midlothian	4–1	1–1	0–0	3–2	4–3	0–2	0–0		1–0	5–0	4–2	0–1	4–0	10–3	2–0	1–1	2–0	1–2
Hibernian	3–1	2–2	1–0	3–1	4–0	3–3	3–1	0–3		4–0	3–1	1–2	1–0	3–0	1–2	0–1	1–1	1–4
Kilmarnock	3–1	0–1	0–2	3–2	2–0	1–1	1–1	2–2	0–1		1–1	0–1	2–1	2–1	4–3	2–3	2–1	2–0
Morton	0–1	2–0	1–2	3–0	1–1	1–1	3–1	1–2	0–3	1–3		2–2	3–1	2–1	1–0	0–3	3–2	4–0
Motherwell	1–1	2–1	1–0	0–1	0–0	1–4	0–0	1–2	5–1	0–1	2–0		4–1	6–3	1–1	1–2	3–1	0–0
Partick Thistle	0–1	1–1	2–3	2–2	2–0	2–1	2–1	1–3	1–2	4–1	5–3	1–1		1–0	2–0	2–3	2–1	3–1
Queen's Park	0–1	0–4	0–1	3–0	1–3	2–1	0–1	1–6	2–5	1–1	3–0	1–1	0–0		1–0	2–3	2–3	0–2
Raith Rovers	0–0	2–4	2–1	5–1	0–0	0–1	3–5	3–3	4–2	0–0	2–2	2–0	0–2	5–0		2–2	2–2	1–3
Rangers	3–1	4–2	0–1	3–1	3–3	2–1	3–2	2–4	5–3	3–0	1–1	3–1	2–0	4–0	4–0		2–1	2–1
St Mirren	2–2	1–0	1–3	1–0	2–0	1–4	0–0	2–1	0–3	4–0	3–2	2–1	2–1	5–0	4–4	0–3		2–2
Third Lanark	0–0	0–0	0–1	0–3	4–1	1–1	0–0	1–0	3–0	0–0	1–5	0–1	1–0	0–1	0–0	0–1	0–0	

Legend: Blue = home team win; Yellow = draw; Red = away team win.
