= John McCartney (footballer, born 1866) =

Scottish footballer and manager

William John McCartney (1866 – 18 January 1933) was a Scottish footballer and football manager whose career lasted from 1884 to 1929.

== Playing career ==
A native of Glasgow, McCartney began as a full back with Cartvale at the age of 18, later playing for Thistle. In 1887 he joined Rangers, staying for two years. before joining Cowlairs.

In 1893, he joined Newton Heath, playing 19 league games and scoring once before joining Luton Town in 1894. He helped Luton gain election to the Football League and played in Luton's first-ever league match on 4 September 1897, a 1–1 draw away to Leicester Fosse. He played 27 times that season, leaving at the end of it to join Barnsley. He scored 3 times in 63 league games for Barnsley before retiring in April 1901 to become Barnsley's secretary-manager.

== Managerial career ==
He left Barnsley in mid-1904, and returned to Scotland to manage St Mirren. He guided the Buddies to the 1908 Scottish Cup Final, losing 5–1 to Celtic.

In 1910 he left St Mirren to take over as manager of Heart of Midlothian. His spell in Edinburgh encompassed the club's rise to the top of the Scottish League with a group of exciting young players he brought in, and the decimation of that team after they enlisted together to fight in World War I, with several killed and others wounded. The closest he came to silverware was in the 1919 Victory Cup where Hearts were defeated in the final by his old club St Mirren. McCartney resigned from his position in October 1919, and was succeeded as Hearts manager by his son Willie.

In May 1920, he was appointed manager of Portsmouth. He guided Portsmouth from Division Three South to the First Division, but resigned due to ill health in May 1927 before he could manage Pompey in the top flight. In September 1927, he returned to management with Luton Town, but with his health declining further, he resigned in December 1929 and retired from football.

McCartney authored two booklets documenting Scottish footballers in the Great War, and those from Hearts who perished. He died in Edinburgh at the age of 66.
