= 1915–16 Scottish Football League =

Scottish Football League
- Season: 1915–16
- Champions: Celtic
- Relegated: N/A

Statistics of the Scottish Football League in season 1915–16. The competition was won by Celtic by eleven points over nearest rival Rangers. Division Two was abandoned due to the outbreak of World War I.

== Scottish League ==
| Pos | Team | Pld | W | D | L | GF | GA | GD | Pts |
|---|---|---|---|---|---|---|---|---|---|
| 1 | Celtic (C) | 38 | 32 | 3 | 3 | 116 | 23 | +93 | 67 |
| 2 | Rangers | 38 | 25 | 6 | 7 | 87 | 39 | +48 | 56 |
| 3 | Morton | 37 | 22 | 7 | 8 | 86 | 35 | +51 | 51 |
| 4 | Ayr United | 38 | 20 | 8 | 10 | 72 | 45 | +27 | 48 |
| 5 | Heart of Midlothian | 37 | 20 | 6 | 11 | 66 | 45 | +21 | 46 |
| 6 | Partick Thistle | 38 | 19 | 8 | 11 | 65 | 41 | +24 | 46 |
| 7 | Hamilton Academical | 38 | 19 | 3 | 16 | 68 | 76 | −8 | 41 |
| 8 | Dundee | 38 | 18 | 4 | 16 | 56 | 49 | +7 | 40 |
| 9 | Dumbarton | 38 | 13 | 11 | 14 | 54 | 64 | −10 | 37 |
| 10 | Kilmarnock | 38 | 12 | 11 | 15 | 46 | 49 | −3 | 35 |
| 11 | Aberdeen | 38 | 11 | 12 | 15 | 51 | 64 | −13 | 34 |
| 12 | Falkirk | 38 | 12 | 9 | 17 | 45 | 61 | −16 | 33 |
| 13 | St Mirren | 38 | 13 | 4 | 21 | 50 | 67 | −17 | 30 |
| 14 | Motherwell | 38 | 11 | 8 | 19 | 55 | 82 | −27 | 30 |
| 15 | Airdrieonians | 38 | 11 | 8 | 19 | 44 | 74 | −30 | 30 |
| 16 | Third Lanark | 38 | 9 | 11 | 18 | 40 | 56 | −16 | 29 |
| 17 | Clyde | 38 | 11 | 7 | 20 | 49 | 71 | −22 | 29 |
| 18 | Queen's Park | 38 | 11 | 6 | 21 | 53 | 100 | −47 | 28 |
| 19 | Hibernian | 38 | 9 | 7 | 22 | 44 | 71 | −27 | 25 |
| 20 | Raith Rovers | 38 | 9 | 5 | 24 | 30 | 65 | −35 | 23 |

Source: "1915-1916 SFL - SPFL Archive". SPFL.
(C) Champions

== Results ==
| Home \ Away | ABE | AIR | AYR | CEL | CLY | DUM | DND | FAL | HAM | HOM | HIB | KIL | MOR | MOT | PAR | QPA | RAI | RAN | STM | THI |
|---|---|---|---|---|---|---|---|---|---|---|---|---|---|---|---|---|---|---|---|---|
| Aberdeen | | 2–1 | 1–1 | 0–4 | 1–1 | 2–2 | 2–0 | 2–0 | 1–3 | 1–1 | 1–1 | 2–0 | 0–1 | 5–0 | 1–1 | 5–1 | 2–1 | 0–0 | 2–1 | 1–1 |
| Airdrieonians | 1–1 | | 3–1 | 0–5 | 4–1 | 2–1 | 1–2 | 2–3 | 1–1 | 0–0 | 1–0 | 0–0 | 0–0 | 4–0 | 0–2 | 3–0 | 2–1 | 0–1 | 0–0 | 1–0 |
| Ayr United | 2–1 | 2–0 | | 0–4 | 2–0 | 3–1 | 1–2 | 4–1 | 1–0 | 3–1 | 2–3 | 2–0 | 1–1 | 3–2 | 0–0 | 4–1 | 1–1 | 1–0 | 1–1 | 6–0 |
| Celtic | 3–1 | 6–0 | 3–1 | | 5–0 | 6–0 | 3–0 | 2–1 | 5–1 | 0–0 | 3–1 | 2–0 | 0–0 | 3–1 | 5–0 | 6–2 | 6–0 | 2–2 | 0–2 | 4–1 |
| Clyde | 3–2 | 1–2 | 1–3 | 1–3 | | 3–1 | 2–0 | 3–2 | 1–2 | 1–4 | 2–1 | 1–1 | 2–3 | 1–2 | 1–2 | 0–1 | 1–0 | 0–2 | 4–1 | 2–2 |
| Dumbarton | 2–1 | 3–1 | 0–3 | 1–2 | 2–1 | | 1–1 | 3–1 | 7–0 | 1–1 | 2–1 | 1–1 | 1–1 | 0–0 | 2–0 | 2–4 | 1–0 | 1–3 | 2–0 | 1–1 |
| Dundee | 1–1 | 4–0 | 2–0 | 0–2 | 1–0 | 0–1 | | 3–3 | 3–1 | 1–0 | 2–1 | 2–0 | 0–1 | 1–3 | 3–0 | 7–1 | 3–0 | 2–0 | 1–0 | 1–0 |
| Falkirk | 0–3 | 3–2 | 1–0 | 0–2 | 1–2 | 1–2 | 2–0 | | 2–1 | 1–1 | 1–1 | 0–0 | 0–0 | 0–1 | 1–0 | 3–2 | 0–0 | 2–0 | 2–1 | 1–1 |
| Hamilton Academical | 2–0 | 2–1 | 2–3 | 2–3 | 3–1 | 1–1 | 4–4 | 0–1 | | 3–2 | 3–2 | 5–2 | 5–2 | 3–1 | 1–0 | 5–2 | 2–0 | 0–1 | 4–1 | 2–1 |
| Heart of Midlothian | 1–2 | 1–1 | 0–5 | 2–0 | 3–1 | 3–1 | 1–0 | 0–2 | 3–0 | | 1–3 | 0–1 | 2–0 | 4–0 | 1–0 | 5–3 | 2–1 | 1–2 | 3–1 | 2–0 |
| Hibernian | 0–0 | 3–0 | 3–1 | 0–4 | 0–1 | 1–1 | 0–2 | 2–1 | 1–3 | 1–2 | | 1–0 | 0–2 | 1–2 | 0–4 | 3–0 | 1–0 | 2–3 | 2–1 | 0–1 |
| Kilmarnock | 5–0 | 4–0 | 0–1 | 0–3 | 0–1 | 5–1 | 2–0 | 1–3 | 3–0 | 3–1 | 0–0 | | 1–1 | 1–0 | 1–1 | 4–0 | 2–0 | 0–3 | 1–1 | 1–1 |
| Morton | 3–0 | 8–2 | 0–1 | 0–1 | 3–0 | 3–1 | 3–1 | 6–0 | 8–1 | | 5–1 | 2–0 | | 1–0 | 0–1 | 5–0 | 4–0 | 2–0 | 3–0 | 2–0 |
| Motherwell | 2–2 | 3–2 | 0–3 | 1–3 | 2–2 | 4–2 | 3–0 | 1–1 | 0–3 | 1–3 | 1–1 | 1–1 | 2–3 | | 2–2 | 2–1 | 1–4 | 2–2 | 3–1 | 3–4 |
| Partick Thistle | 3–0 | 4–1 | 1–1 | 0–4 | 2–3 | 0–0 | 2–0 | 5–2 | 0–1 | 0–2 | 4–1 | 4–0 | 3–2 | 3–1 | | 5–0 | 2–0 | 5–2 | 4–0 | 1–0 |
| Queen's Park | 0–1 | 3–0 | 2–2 | 0–1 | 2–2 | 0–2 | 2–0 | 2–1 | 2–1 | 0–3 | 4–2 | 1–2 | 4–4 | 1–4 | 1–1 | | 4–1 | 0–6 | 2–1 | 0–0 |
| Raith Rovers | 3–1 | 1–1 | 0–4 | 0–2 | 2–0 | 1–0 | 0–2 | 3–1 | 2–0 | 1–2 | 1–1 | 1–1 | 2–1 | 1–0 | 2–0 | 0–3 | | 1–3 | 0–1 | 0–1 |
| Rangers | 4–0 | 3–0 | 5–2 | 3–0 | 2–2 | 2–2 | 3–2 | 1–0 | 3–0 | 0–4 | 4–2 | 3–1 | 1–0 | 4–1 | 0–1 | 6–0 | 3–0 | | 4–0 | 4–0 |
| St Mirren | 3–2 | 2–4 | 1–0 | 0–5 | 1–0 | 1–2 | 1–2 | 2–1 | 5–0 | 4–1 | 3–1 | 3–0 | 1–3 | 5–0 | 0–2 | 1–2 | 2–0 | 1–1 | | 1–0 |
| Third Lanark | 6–2 | 0–1 | 1–1 | 0–4 | 1–1 | 4–0 | 2–1 | 0–0 | 0–1 | 1–3 | 3–0 | 1–2 | 1–3 | 1–3 | 0–0 | 0–0 | 2–0 | 0–1 | 3–0 | |

Legend: Blue = home team win; Yellow = draw; Red = away team win.

== See also ==
- 1915–16 in Scottish football
