= 1913–14 Scottish Division One =

21st season of top-tier football league in Scotland

Scottish Division One
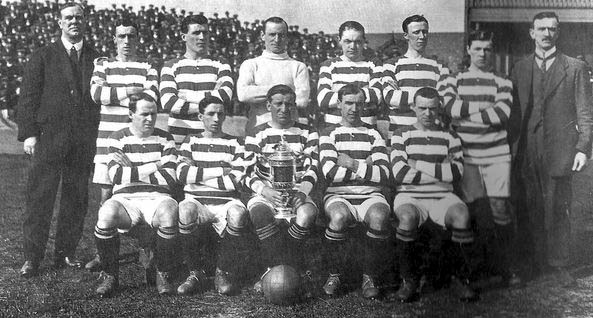
- Celtic F.C. players who were double winners during 1913-14 by winning the Scottish league championship and Scottish Cup.
- Season: 1913–14
- Champions: Celtic

The 1913–14 Scottish Division One season was won by Celtic by six points over nearest rival Rangers.

== League table ==
Pos	Team	Pld	W	D	L	GF	GA	GD	Pts
1	Celtic (C)	38	30	5	3	81	14	+67	65
2	Rangers	38	27	5	6	79	31	+48	59
3	Heart of Midlothian	38	23	8	7	70	29	+41	54
4	Morton	38	26	2	10	76	51	+25	54
5	Falkirk	38	20	9	9	69	51	+18	49
6	Airdrieonians	38	18	12	8	72	43	+29	48
7	Dundee	38	19	5	14	64	53	+11	43
8	Third Lanark	38	13	10	15	42	51	−9	36
9	Clyde	38	11	11	16	44	44	0	33
10	Ayr United	38	13	7	18	56	72	−16	33
11	Raith Rovers	38	13	6	19	56	57	−1	32
12	Kilmarnock	38	11	9	18	48	68	−20	31
13	Hibernian	38	12	6	20	58	75	−17	30
14	Aberdeen	38	10	10	18	38	55	−17	30
15	Partick Thistle	38	10	9	19	37	51	−14	29
16	Queen's Park	38	10	9	19	52	84	−32	29
17	Motherwell	38	11	6	21	46	65	−19	28
18	Hamilton Academical	38	11	6	21	49	66	−17	28
19	Dumbarton	38	10	7	21	45	87	−42	27
20	St Mirren	38	8	6	24	38	73	−35	22

Source: "1913-1914 Division 1 - SPFL Archive". SPFL.
(C) Champions

== Results ==
Home \ Away	ABE	AIR	AYR	CEL	CLY	DUM	DND	FAL	HAM	HOM	HIB	KIL	MOR	MOT	PAR	QPA	RAI	RAN	STM	THI
Aberdeen		0–0	2–2	0–1	1–2	2–3	2–2	0–0	5–0	0–1	1–2	1–2	2–1	0–0	0–0	2–1	1–0	0–0	2–1	0–0
Airdrieonians	4–1		1–1	0–1	1–1	4–1	3–0	0–0	3–2	2–2	4–3	3–1	7–1	3–1	0–0	3–3	5–2	0–3	3–1	0–0
Ayr United	2–1	0–2		0–6	2–0	1–2	1–3	3–2	3–1	0–4	1–2	0–0	0–2	4–0	2–1	2–2	0–0	1–2	2–0	2–0
Celtic	2–1	1–0	5–1		2–0	4–0	1–0	4–0	1–0	0–0	3–0	4–0	3–0	0–0	1–1	5–0	2–1	4–0	0–2	3–0
Clyde	1–0	0–0	1–2	0–1		0–0	2–1	1–1	0–2	2–2	4–0	0–0	3–0	5–0	2–1	3–1	0–1	0–1	0–3	3–1
Dumbarton	0–1	1–0	2–1	0–4	1–3		2–3	0–4	1–1	2–1	0–3	1–1	2–6	1–1	1–0	4–0	2–2	0–3	2–1	2–0
Dundee	0–1	2–0	2–0	0–1	2–0	5–1		4–1	1–0	2–2	2–2	3–1	1–2	2–1	4–1	5–2	2–1	0–2	1–0	3–1
Falkirk	2–0	1–1	1–3	1–0	1–0	3–1	4–0		2–1	0–0	3–2	4–1	1–1	2–0	4–3	3–2	4–0	4–1	3–1	1–1
Hamilton Academical	3–0	2–4	4–0	1–2	1–1	3–1	1–1	1–1		1–3	0–1	6–0	1–1	1–0	2–1	2–3	1–0	0–1	1–0	0–1
Heart of Midlothian	4–0	3–1	2–1	2–0	1–0	5–1	3–0	1–0	1–0		3–1	0–1	4–0	2–1	1–0	1–0	2–0	2–1	6–0	0–0
Hibernian	1–0	1–4	0–5	1–2	1–1	1–1	4–1	0–3	6–0	1–2		0–1	1–2	2–0	0–2	2–3	0–3	0–3	5–3	1–0
Kilmarnock	1–2	3–2	0–1	0–1	2–2	6–0	0–0	2–3	5–2	0–3	0–3		0–1	2–0	2–0	3–0	3–1	1–6	3–1	1–1
Morton	3–1	0–2	2–1	0–4	2–0	3–1	3–0	6–0	4–2	3–0	2–1	2–0		3–1	1–0	2–1	2–1	0–1	4–0	3–1
Motherwell	3–2	0–1	2–0	1–1	2–1	4–3	0–1	1–2	3–1	0–2	2–3	4–0	2–3		1–1	1–3	3–2	1–0	3–0	1–2
Partick Thistle	0–1	0–1	0–3	0–0	1–1	2–1	2–1	1–2	0–2	2–1	3–0	4–2	1–3	2–1		1–1	2–1	1–1	2–1	1–0
Queen's Park	2–2	0–2	3–3	0–2	0–2	3–0	0–4	3–1	0–0	1–1	4–2	3–1	1–3	4–2	1–0		2–0	0–6	0–0	2–2
Raith Rovers	4–1	1–1	5–1	1–2	2–0	1–2	4–1	0–1	5–2	0–0	1–1	1–1	1–2	0–3	3–0	1–0		0–3	5–1	3–0
Rangers	5–1	2–0	5–2	0–2	2–1	3–2	0–1	3–2	3–0	3–2	1–1	1–0	1–0	0–0	0–0	3–0	4–0		2–1	2–0
St Mirren	0–2	1–4	1–1	0–3	3–2	1–1	0–3	1–1	1–0	1–0	3–3	1–1	0–2	4–0	1–0	3–1	0–1	0–1		1–2
Third Lanark	0–0	1–1	4–2	1–3	0–0	1–0	2–1	2–1	1–2	2–1	2–1	1–1	3–1	0–1	2–1	5–0	0–2	2–4	1–0	

Legend: Blue = home team win; Yellow = draw; Red = away team win.
