= 1914–15 Scottish Division One =

22nd season of top-tier football league in Scotland

Scottish Division One
- Season: 1914–15
- Champions: Celtic

The 1914–15 Scottish Division One season was won by Celtic by four points over nearest rival Heart of Midlothian.

== League table ==
Pos	Team	Pld	W	D	L	GF	GA	GD	Pts
1	Celtic (C)	38	30	5	3	91	25	+66	65
2	Heart of Midlothian	38	27	7	4	83	32	+51	61
3	Rangers	38	23	4	11	74	47	+27	50
4	Morton	38	18	12	8	74	48	+26	48
5	Ayr United	38	20	8	10	55	40	+15	48
6	Falkirk	38	16	7	15	48	48	0	39
7	Partick Thistle	38	15	8	15	56	58	−2	38
8	Hamilton Academical	38	16	6	16	60	55	+5	38
9	St Mirren	38	14	8	16	56	65	−9	36
10	Hibernian	38	12	11	15	59	66	−7	35
11	Airdrieonians	38	14	7	17	54	60	−6	35
12	Dumbarton	38	13	8	17	51	66	−15	34
13	Kilmarnock	38	15	4	19	55	59	−4	34
14	Dundee	38	12	9	17	43	61	−18	33
15	Aberdeen	38	11	11	16	39	52	−13	33
16	Third Lanark	38	10	12	16	51	57	−6	32
17	Clyde	38	12	6	20	44	59	−15	30
18	Motherwell	38	10	10	18	49	66	−17	30
19	Raith Rovers	38	9	10	19	53	68	−15	28
20	Queen's Park	38	4	5	29	27	90	−63	13

(C) Champions

== Results ==
Home \ Away	ABE	AIR	AYR	CEL	CLY	DUM	DND	FAL	HAM	HOM	HIB	KIL	MOR	MOT	PAR	QPA	RAI	RAN	STM	THI
Aberdeen		3–0	1–1	0–1	2–0	0–0	2–1	1–2	1–0	0–0	0–0	3–0	2–0	3–1	0–0	1–1	1–3	0–2	0–0	1–2
Airdrieonians	3–0		1–2	0–1	2–1	4–1	3–4	3–2	3–2	2–2	1–3	0–2	0–0	4–1	0–0	2–1	3–3	1–2	2–1	1–0
Ayr United	1–0	0–0		1–0	3–1	2–1	0–0	1–2	2–0	0–2	2–1	2–0	2–1	1–1	4–0	2–1	3–0	2–0	0–2	1–0
Celtic	1–0	3–0	4–0		3–0	1–0	6–0	1–0	3–1	1–1	5–1	2–0	6–2	1–0	6–1	5–1	3–1	2–1	2–1	1–0
Clyde	3–0	0–0	3–1	0–2		2–1	1–1	4–2	2–2	1–2	1–0	1–0	2–3	0–0	1–3	2–1	1–0	1–2	1–2	1–2
Dumbarton	3–2	1–4	1–2	1–4	2–1		1–1	0–1	0–1	3–2	1–0	1–0	3–2	1–1	0–2	3–0	3–1	1–1	2–4	2–1
Dundee	1–3	2–0	2–3	1–3	3–0	0–0		1–0	1–0	1–2	2–4	0–1	1–1	1–0	1–2	2–0	2–0	1–1	2–1	0–0
Falkirk	1–1	2–1	1–1	0–1	3–1	1–3	0–1		2–0	1–1	0–0	3–2	2–0	5–1	2–1	1–0	3–1	1–3	2–0	1–1
Hamilton Academical	3–0	0–1	2–1	0–1	3–2	4–1	2–0	0–1		1–3	2–2	0–0	1–1	0–3	2–2	3–0	1–1	4–3	5–2	4–2
Heart of Midlothian	2–0	3–1	1–0	2–0	2–0	4–1	3–2	2–0	3–0		3–1	3–1	1–0	2–0	3–1	2–2	4–0	3–4	5–0	2–0
Hibernian	1–2	1–0	0–4	1–1	3–1	2–2	2–0	1–1	0–2	2–2		3–1	1–1	1–2	4–1	4–0	2–1	1–2	3–2	4–2
Kilmarnock	5–2	2–1	1–2	1–3	0–3	4–0	3–2	1–0	1–0	0–2	5–1		2–2	2–2	2–0	3–0	3–1	0–1	2–1	2–1
Morton	1–1	4–1	3–0	0–2	2–0	3–2	2–0	1–0	4–0	2–0	0–0	3–1		2–0	2–2	4–2	1–0	0–1	3–3	4–2
Motherwell	1–1	4–2	1–1	1–1	0–2	2–3	1–1	4–1	2–4	0–1	3–0	3–2	1–1		1–0	1–0	1–2	2–4	0–2	3–2
Partick Thistle	3–0	4–0	2–0	0–2	0–0	1–2	4–1	2–0	1–4	0–2	3–1	0–0	1–5	4–1		5–0	2–1	3–1	0–1	1–1
Queen's Park	3–1	0–1	1–1	0–3	0–1	2–2	0–3	1–2	0–2	0–4	0–2	1–0	0–2	0–3	0–2		1–3	0–4	4–1	1–2
Raith Rovers	5–1	3–0	0–0	2–2	2–0	1–2	1–1	1–3	1–3	1–3	1–1	3–0	1–1	2–1	2–2	1–2		1–2	2–2	1–1
Rangers	1–1	0–5	1–3	2–1	1–2	1–0	2–0	3–0	1–0	1–2	4–2	2–1	0–2	5–0	0–1	4–1	1–2		5–0	3–0
St Mirren	0–2	0–0	1–3	3–3	3–1	1–1	0–1	2–0	1–0	1–0	4–2	2–3	2–4	1–1	2–0	3–0	3–2	0–2		2–0
Third Lanark	0–1	0–2	2–1	0–4	1–1	1–0	7–0	0–0	1–2	2–2	2–2	3–2	3–3	1–0	4–0	1–1	3–0	1–1	0–0	

Legend: Blue = home team win; Yellow = draw; Red = away team win.
