= Heart of Midlothian F.C. and World War I =

Historic event

Between August and November 1914, sixteen Heart of Midlothian Football Club players enlisted to fight in World War I. In doing so, they became the first British team to sign up en masse. The majority joined the 16th (Service) Battalion of the Royal Scots, otherwise known as McCrae's Battalion. On the first day of the Battle of the Somme in 1916, the British Army lost nearly 20,000 men, including three of Hearts footballers who had signed up. The war ended up claiming the lives of seven of the Hearts players who had enlisted, with several others returning so severely wounded they were unable to play football again.

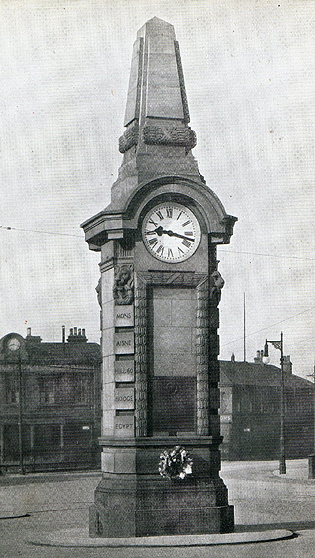
Heart of Midlothian War Memorial unveiled in 1922

A memorial was erected in Edinburgh in 1922 to honour these men and the many others who fought in the two world wars. It is presently situated in the Haymarket, near the offices where the main batch of players enlisted.

== Enlistment ==
Hearts began the 1914–15 season with eight straight victories, including a 2–0 defeat of reigning champions Celtic. However, Britain had declared war on Germany in August 1914 and an ongoing public debate took place as to whether it was appropriate for professional football to continue while young soldiers were dying on the front line. The matter was debated in Parliament and a motion was placed before the Scottish Football Association (SFA) to postpone the season, with one of its backers, Airdrieonians chairman Thomas Forsyth declaring that "playing football while our men are fighting is repugnant". While this motion was defeated at the ballot box, with the SFA opting to wait for War Office advice, the noted East London philanthropist Frederick Charrington was orchestrating a public campaign to have professional football in Britain suspended, and achieving great popular support for his cause. The prime tactic of Charrington's campaign was to shame football players and officials into action through public and private denouncement. Letters were sent in to newspapers; the Edinburgh Evening News published one signed "A soldier's daughter", which suggested that "while Hearts continue to play football, enabled thus to pursue their peaceful play by the sacrifice of the lives of thousands of their countrymen, they might accept, temporarily, a nom de plume, say 'The White Feathers of Midlothian.'"

Hearts, however, had already made active efforts to aid the war effort. Two players enlisted before a ball was even kicked in the season. On 16 August 1914, former Hearts director Harry Rawson, chairman of the Edinburgh Territorial Force Association, asked manager John McCartney if the club would use its influence to encourage recruiting. McCartney agreed to allow the authorities access to Tynecastle on match days in order to canvass for volunteers. On 20 August, it was announced that the entire playing staff would take part in weekly drill sessions to prepare them for the possibility of military service. The invitation was also extended to the players of rivals Hibernian to join in, several of whom accepted. On 14 November, the Queen's Own Cameron Highlanders made an urgent appeal for volunteers at half time in a match at Tynecastle against Falkirk. The initial response was disappointing, but at full-time several men stepped forward, including Hearts' winger James Speedie.

In response to increasing appeals for volunteers, Sir George McCrae, a popular figure in Edinburgh, announced in November 1914 that he would raise a battalion himself – the 16th Royal Scots – and he boasted it would be full within seven days. At this time, Hearts comfortably led the First Division, but 11 of their players (in addition to the three players already serving) enlisted en-masse on 25 November 1914, with a further five being declared unfit to serve. The following day, a further two players signed up, bringing the total up to 16 Hearts footballers enlisted in the services. 'McCrae's Battalion', as it came to be known, was the original sportsman's battalion. At least 30 professional footballers enlisted, including players from Hibernian, Raith Rovers, Falkirk and Dunfermline, as well as Hearts. The battalion was to become the 16th Royal Scots and was the first to earn the "footballer's battalion" sobriquet. The group of volunteers also contained some 500 Hearts supporters and ticket-holders, as well as 150 of Hibernian's followers.

Military training was thus added to the Hearts players football training regime, and the side had a 20-game unbeaten run between October and February. The press described Hearts' football as "dainty, dazzling" and being "full of pace and panache." However, exhaustion from their army exertions, twice including 10-hour nocturnal-marches the night before a league game, eventually led to a drop in form, as several enlisted players missed key games. Defeats to St Mirren and Morton allowed Celtic to usurp the Maroons and eventually claim the league title by four points. The Edinburgh Evening News expressed sympathy for Hearts and criticised their rivals; "Between them the two leading Glasgow clubs [Celtic and Rangers] have not sent a single prominent player to the Army. There is only one football champion in Scotland, and its colours are maroon and khaki."

As the war progressed, more Hearts players joined the services, including captain Bob Mercer who was conscripted in 1916 in spite of his cruciate injury and despite having been turned down in November 1914 when he attempted to enlist with his teammates.

== Fighting ==
The war claimed the lives of seven first team players:

- James Speedie – killed in action, 25 September 1915
- Tom Gracie – died on service, 23 October 1915
- Duncan Currie – killed in action, 1 July 1916
- Harry Wattie – killed in action, 1 July 1916
- Ernest Ellis – killed in action, 1 July 1916
- James Boyd – killed in action, 3 August 1916
- John Allan – killed in action, 22 April 1917

Several players were discharged invalid as a result of wounds and injuries sustained:

- Alfie Briggs – wounded on 1 July 1916
- Paddy Crossan – wounded twice and also gassed
- James Hazeldean – wounded
- James Low – wounded twice
- James Martin – wounded twice
- Edward McGuire – wounded
- Bob Mercer – gassed in 1918
- George Sinclair – injured on service

Five of the club's pre-war players died during the war:

- George Badenoch (1901) – killed in action, 15 June 1915
- Bill Cox (1907) – suffered wounded and died from dysentery, 6 November 1915
- David Philip (1903–1910) – killed in action, 29 April 1917
- Dick Harker (1909-1911) - killed in action 9 September 1917
- Bobby Atherton (1895–1897) – disappeared or killed in action, 19 October 1917

== Hearts players who served ==
McCrae's Battalion
Died:
Jimmy Boyd
Duncan Currie
Ernest Ellis
Tom Gracie
Jimmy Hawthorne
Harry Wattie
Survived:
Alfie Briggs (wounded)
Paddy Crossan (wounded)
Norman Findlay
Jimmy Frew
James Hazeldean (wounded)
James Low (wounded)
Teddy McGuire (wounded)
Annan Ness (wounded)
Bob Preston (wounded)
Willie Wilson (wounded)

Other units
Died:
James Speedie
John Allan
Survived:
Colin Blackhall
James Gilbert
Harry Graham
Charles Hallwood
James Macdonald
Edward McGuire (wounded)
John Mackenzie
James Martin
Bob Mercer (wounded)
George Miller
Neil Moreland (wounded)
George Sinclair
Wattie Scott
Philip Whyte
John Wilson (wounded)

== Aftermath ==
Of the Hearts players that survived the war, several returned to play for the club again, including George Sinclair, Paddy Crossan and Bob Mercer. In 1919 they reached the final of the Victory Cup. Mercer, however, was never the same player but continued playing until retiring in 1924. He was persuaded to return for a farewell appearance in a friendly match against Selkirk at Ettrick Park in 1926. A few minutes into the game, Mercer suffered a fatal heart attack. Crossan's end was similar; he succumbed to his gas injuries in 1933. Sinclair fared better and continued to play football into the 1920s, including a spell in the United States. He went on to run Sinclair’s Bar in the Abbeyhill area of Edinburgh until his death in 1959.

Hearts unveiled a memorial clocktower in Edinburgh's Haymarket junction on 9 April 1922, the fifth anniversary of the opening of the Battle of Arras. Secretary of State for Scotland, Robert Munro, told the attending crowd of 65,000 that the country owed a debt of gratitude to Hearts that could never be repaid. In 2013, following a period in storage during tramway construction, the Heart of Midlothian War Memorial returned close to its original location in time to mark the hundredth year since the start of World War I and the formation of McCrae's Battalion. In October 2014, the battalion was inducted into the Scottish Football Hall of Fame.

Every Remembrance Sunday, officials, players and supporters of Heart of Midlothian Football Club gather to pay their respects. In 2004 a commemorative cairn was unveiled at Contalmaison in France. Every year since 2005 a service is held in the village on the 1st of July marking the first day of the battle of the Somme. Such is the impact and importance of the cairn (marking the point of the furthest incursion into German lines by allied troops on the 1st July 1916) that in 2016 the service held in the village was one of only five official services allowed on the Somme that day.

In 2018, the interactive play A War of Two Halves was presented at Tynecastle, dealing with the stories of the original 13 players who joined the 16th (Service) Battalion of the Royal Scots. It was first shown as part of the Edinburgh Festival Fringe on 27 August 2018. It ran again in the run-up to the centenary of the Armistice of 11 November 1918.

== See also ==
- Heart of Midlothian F.C.
- Association football during World War I
