= Edward Mooney =

Edward Mooney may refer to:

- Edward Aloysius Mooney (1882–1958), Roman Catholic Cardinal Archbishop of Detroit, former Bishop of Rochester
- Edward F. Mooney (born 1941), Kierkegaard scholar and professor of religion at Syracuse University
- Edward Ludlow Mooney (1813–1887), American painter
- Peter Mooney (footballer) (Edward Mooney, 1897–?), English footballer
