= 1924 FA Cup final =

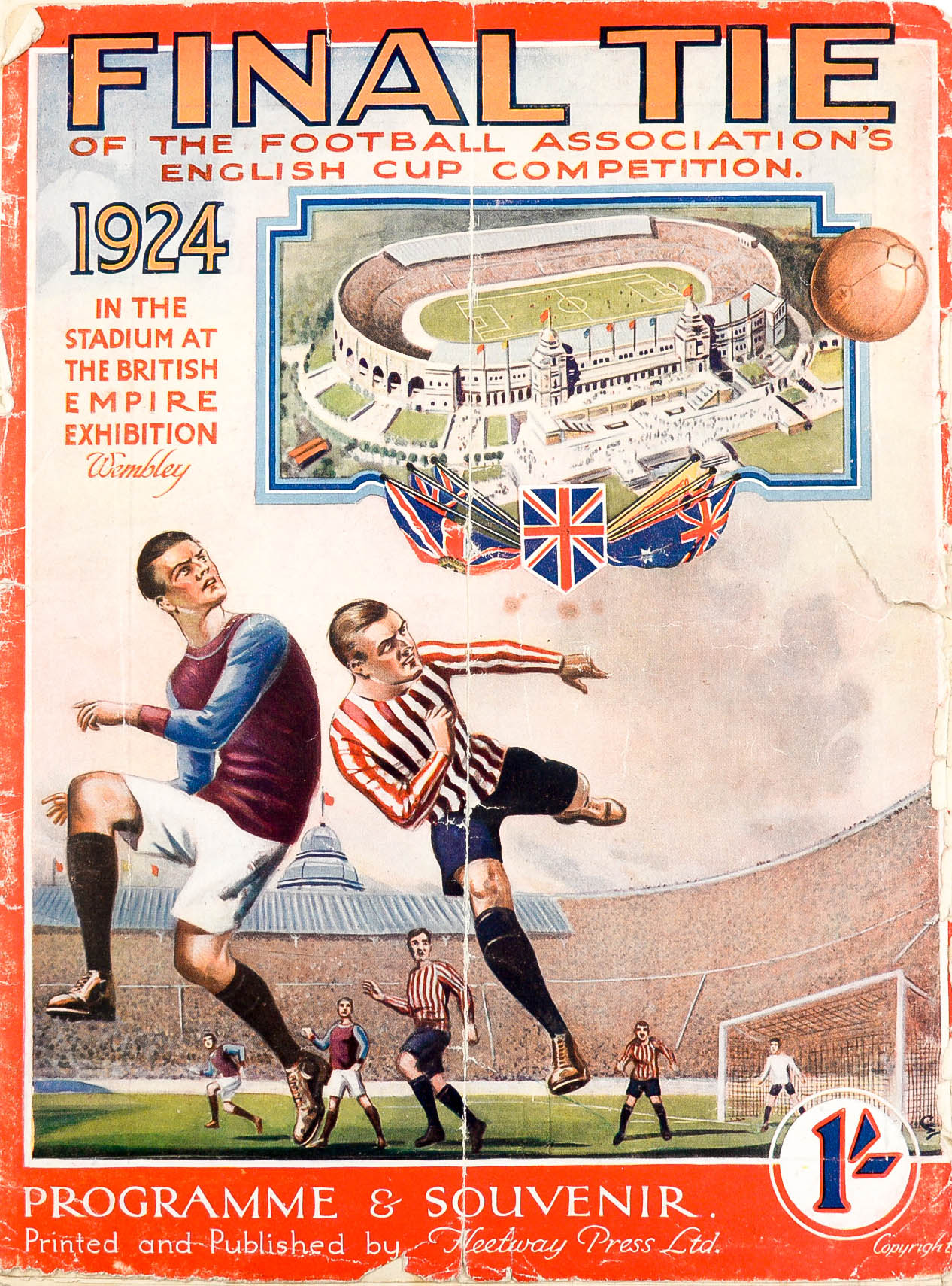
- Illustrated programme
- Event: 1923–24 FA Cup
Newcastle United	Aston Villa
2	0
- Date: 26 April 1924
- Venue: Empire Stadium, London
- Referee: W. E. Russell (Swindon)
- Attendance: 91,695
- Weather: Rain

The 1924 FA Cup final was the deciding match of the 1923–24 FA Cup competition, contested by Newcastle United and Aston Villa. It was the second final to be held at the Empire Stadium, Wembley, and took place three days after the opening of the British Empire Exhibition. It was an all-ticket match in response to the severe crowd congestion the previous year. The Duke of York was in attendance as the guest of honour.

Newcastle reached the final after a prolonged Cup run that included three replays against Derby County and a win against the reigning League champions, Liverpool, while Aston Villa conceded just one goal in their run to the final, which included wins against previous competition winners West Bromwich Albion and Burnley.

The final was played on a heavy pitch as a consequence of torrential rain in the hours before the match. Newcastle won 2–0 in a match that many reporters considered to be an outstanding final, and that featured several international players in each team. The goals were scored in the last eight minutes by Neil Harris and Stan Seymour, after Newcastle's stand-in goalkeeper Bill Bradley had made several good saves. Aston Villa were affected by an injury during the match to their star inside-forward, Billy Walker.

This was the second time Newcastle had won the FA Cup, and they returned to win it again in 1932. Aston Villa had won the competition a record six times previously, but did not do so again until 1957.

== Route to the Final ==
As First Division clubs, Newcastle United and Aston Villa entered the competition in the first round proper, in which 64 teams competed.

=== Newcastle United ===
Round	Opposition	Score	Venue
1st	Portsmouth	4–2	Fratton Park (a)
2nd	Derby County	2–2	Baseball Ground (a)
(replay)	Derby County	2–2 aet	St James' Park (h)
(2nd replay)	Derby County	2–2 aet	Burnden Park (n)
(3rd replay)	Derby County	5–3	St James' Park (h)
3rd	Watford	1–0	Vicarage Road (a)
Quarter-final	Liverpool	1–0	St James' Park (h)
Semi-final	Manchester City	2–0	St Andrew's (n)

Newcastle's FA Cup run began with a 4–2 win away to Portsmouth of the Third Division South, when they recovered from falling two goals behind in the first half. They then required four matches to beat Second Division Derby County, with Neil Harris scoring a hat-trick in an eventual 5–3 win after the first three matches between the teams had all been drawn 2–2. After beating another Third Division South team, Watford, 1–0 at Vicarage Road, they faced the reigning First Division champions Liverpool at home. Fred Hopkin hit the post for Liverpool early in the match, but Tommy McDonald gave Newcastle the lead with a header after 18 minutes and their defenders contained Liverpool's forwards for the rest of the game.

Newcastle played Manchester City in the semi-finals at St Andrew's. City's team included the 49-year-old forward Billy Meredith, who had scored the winning goal in the Cup final twenty years earlier and was playing the last game of his professional career. Newcastle won 2–0 with two further goals from Harris to reach the final.

=== Aston Villa ===
Round	Opposition	Score	Venue
1st	Ashington	5–1	Portland Park (a)
2nd	Swansea Town	2–0	Vetch Field (a)
3rd	Leeds United	3–0	Villa Park (h)
Quarter-final	West Bromwich Albion	2–0	The Hawthorns (a)
Semi-final	Burnley	3–0	Bramall Lane (n)

Aston Villa's route to the final was rather more straightforward than that of their Wembley opponents, as they scored 15 goals and conceded just one in five consecutive wins. They began with a comfortable 5–1 win against the Third Division North team Ashington, who were reduced to ten players by injury. Billy Walker scored twice and George Blackburn scored his first goal for Villa. They then beat Swansea Town 2–0 at Vetch Field, with Len Capewell continuing a strong goalscoring run with both goals. Capewell scored twice more when Villa survived an early onslaught from their opponents to beat Second Division Leeds United 3–0 in the third round. In the later rounds they defeated two previous Cup winners from the lower half of the First Division, West Bromwich Albion and Burnley. Albion had earlier ended the run of the non-League amateur side, the Corinthians, who had caused the sensation of that season's competition when they knocked out Blackburn Rovers in the first round, but they were well beaten by Villa at The Hawthorns thanks to first-half goals by Capewell and Arthur Dorrell. Villa's goals in the 3–0 semi-final win against Burnley came from Dicky York, who scored twice, and Billy Kirton. Capewell was Villa's top scorer during their cup run, with six goals, including at least one in each of the first four rounds.

== Pre-match ==
At the time of the 1923–24 season, Aston Villa had already won the FA Cup six times under the management of George Ramsay, most recently against Huddersfield Town in 1920. The club was celebrating its golden jubilee in 1924. They had reached the first finals at both the Crystal Palace and Stamford Bridge, and were now appearing in the second final at the Empire Stadium. By contrast, Newcastle had only one previous success in the competition, in 1910, although they had been runners-up four times between 1905 and 1911. Their first Cup final, in 1905, had ended in a 2–0 defeat to Aston Villa, with Harry Hampton scoring both goals. Newcastle had failed to win any of their previous FA Cup final fixtures in London, with their previous finals all having been played at the Crystal Palace and their only victory coming in the 1910 replay against Barnsley at Goodison Park, Liverpool.

On 12 April, the Empire Stadium hosted its first international match, when England played Scotland in the last match of that season's Home Championship. The result, a 1–1 draw, left England in last place in the competition. Newcastle's Charlie Spencer made his England debut, and faced his club team-mates Billy Cowan and Neil Harris, who were both making their first appearances for Scotland. Aston Villa's Tommy Smart, Frank Moss and Billy Walker were also in England's team, and George Blackburn was an unused squad member. Moss captained England, and Walker had the honour of scoring England's first goal at the new stadium.

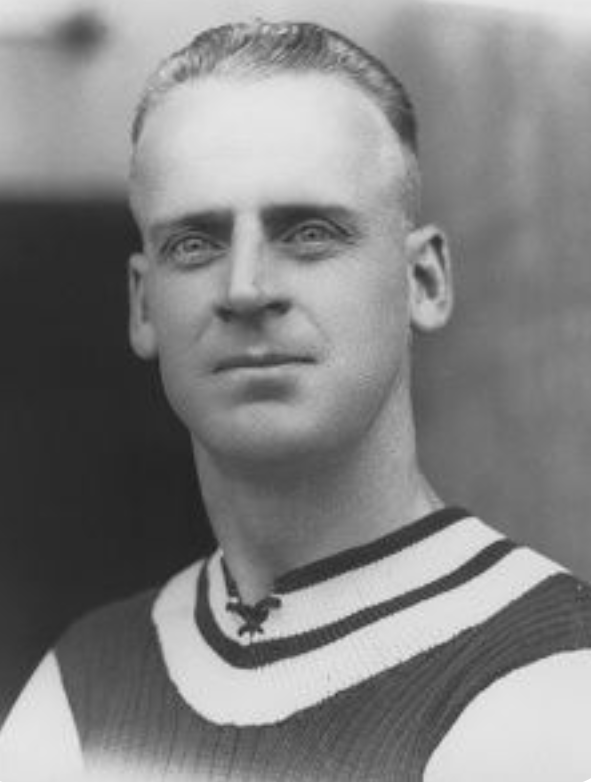
Aston Villa's England international inside-left Billy Walker, pictured in 1925

During the 1923–24 First Division season, both Newcastle and Aston Villa occupied a position in the top half of the table, as they had each season since the end of the First World War. Newcastle beat Aston Villa 4–1 at St James' Park on New Year's Day, but when the teams met again at Villa Park on Easter Monday, just five days before the Cup final, Aston Villa won convincingly, 6–1, with Walker scoring a hat-trick. Walker had scored another hat-trick against Newcastle in a League match four years earlier. It was Villa's biggest League win of the season and the first time Newcastle had conceded six in a League match since 1909. Newcastle fielded a virtual reserve team for this match and received a fine as a consequence. Only Willie Gibson kept his place for the Cup final, but their Scottish goalkeeper Sandy Mutch suffered a serious knee injury that ruled him out of the final and prematurely ended his career. Mutch had played for Huddersfield Town in two previous finals, including the 1920 match against Aston Villa.

The match was hugely anticipated, with The Times recalling the clubs' previous meeting in 1905 as "the best that has been played since the Cup was first instituted" while also noting the tendency for more recent finals to produce "negative football" and that the two teams "do not approach the old standard of play". The Manchester Guardian stated that the finalists "represent all that is best and most clever in English football". Aston Villa were the favourites, and were described as having "a more skilful line of half-backs, and superior defence". Their defensive record was among the best in the First Division that season. Their captain, Moss, who played with shrapnel in his knee as a result of action at the Battle of Passchendaele, described their team as having "a rattling good defence, strong halves and a nippy front rank". Villa's team retained five players who had appeared in the club's previous final in 1920: Smart, Moss, Walker, the inside-right Billy Kirton, who had scored the only goal in extra-time in that final, and the outside-left Arthur Dorrell. Six of their team were England internationals, with Tommy Mort, Dicky York and the Newcastle-born Kirton having won international caps in addition to the three players who faced Scotland at Wembley in April 1924. They fielded just one Scotsman – Vic Milne, a qualified doctor – who had come into the side at centre-half in November after the murder of Tommy Ball. Since the transfer of Clem Stephenson to Huddersfield in 1920, the skilful Walker had become the leader of the attack: Smart, whose full-back partnership with Mort was nicknamed 'Death and Glory', referred to Villa's team of the period as consisting of "Billy Walker and ten others".

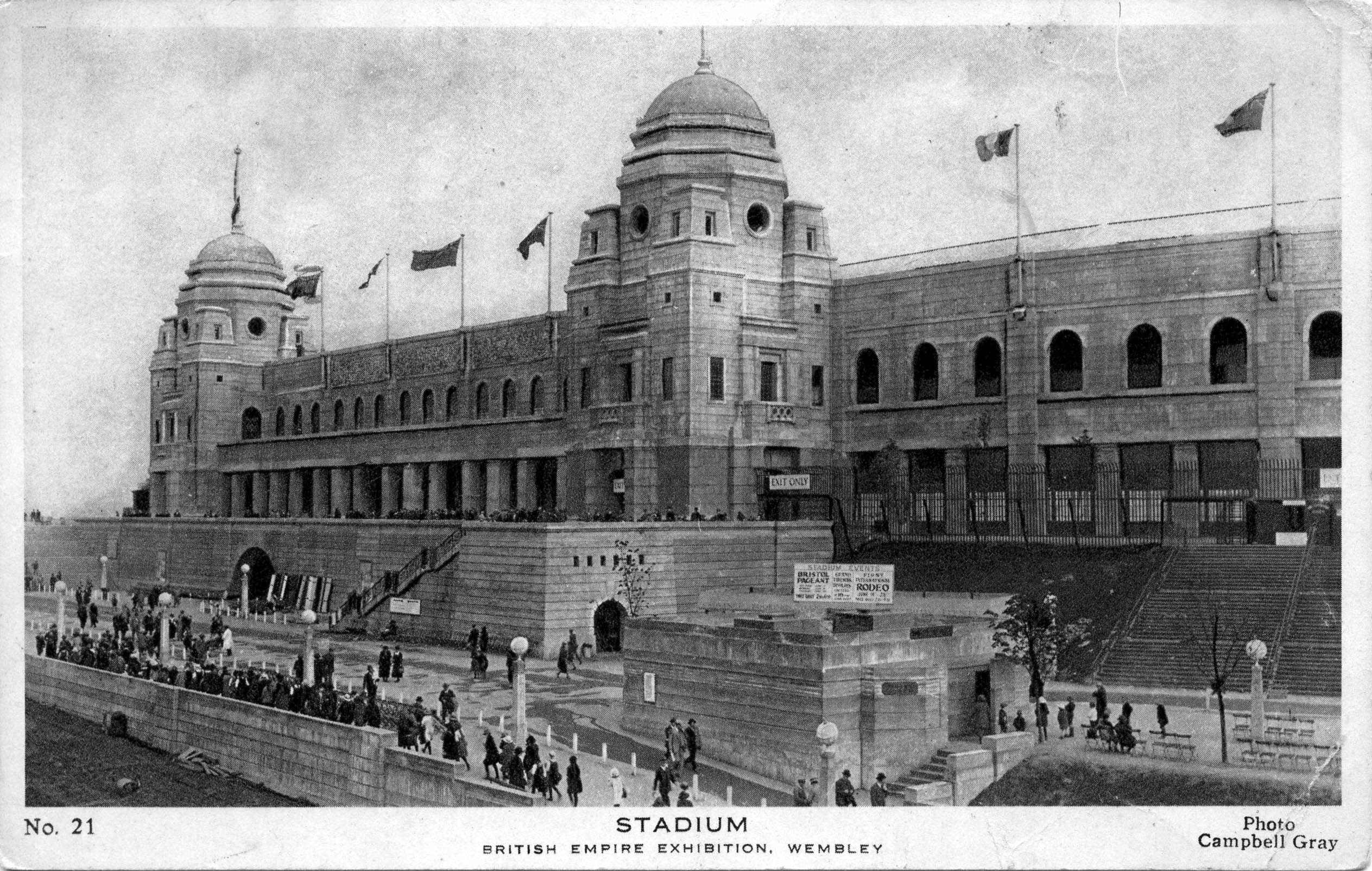
Postcard for the British Empire Exhibition showing the Empire stadium at the time of the 1924 FA Cup final

In contrast, the three players who had made their debuts in the recent England-Scotland fixture were the only internationals in Newcastle's line-up, which contained five Scotsmen. Scottish players dominated the forward line, led by the pacy and powerful centre-forward Harris, and the Englishman Stan Seymour, the outside-left, also had experience playing in Scottish football with Morton. Harris and Seymour had each scored more than twenty times in the 1923–24 season. Newcastle were the older team on average, and The Times highlighted their half-back line as a relative weakness, with their inexperienced centre-half Spencer having turned in a "sorry display" in the recent international match and their full-backs Frank Hudspeth and Billy Hampson having "arrived at an age when they are slowing down". Hampson was aged 39 but for many years was incorrectly named as the oldest known player to have appeared in the final, at 41. Hudspeth and his former full-back partner Bill McCracken, who had left the club in 1923, had taken advantage of the three-player offside law that was then in place to develop an offside trap known as the one-back system. Other clubs, including Aston Villa, had also adopted this defensive strategy, and the 1924 final was the penultimate Cup final to be played under the three-player offside law before it was abolished ahead of the 1925–26 season.

On Saint George's Day, three days before the final, King George V visited the Empire Stadium to open the British Empire Exhibition, which was being held in the adjoining Wembley Park, and delivered a speech that was broadcast by radio, the first such transmission by a reigning monarch. That evening, around 300 Newcastle supporters set sail for London on board the tramp steamer, SS Bernicia. Scores of special trains carried spectators to London on the morning of the match, not only from the north-east and the Midlands but also from other major cities across Britain: these included Cardiff, with many Cardiff City supporters reported as having booked advance tickets before their team was knocked out by Manchester City in a quarter-final replay. One of these trains, travelling from Coventry, was involved in a collision in which four people were killed and more than fifty were injured.

== Match ==
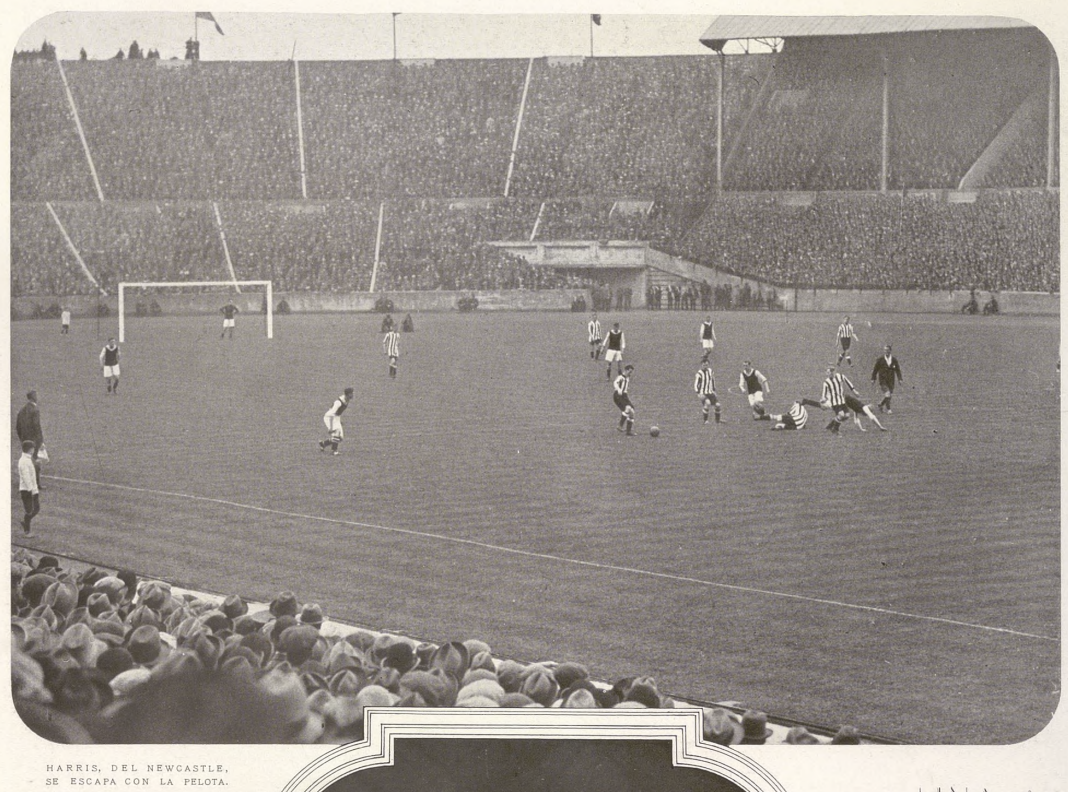
Neil Harris (Newcastle United) escapes with the ball.

In response to the major crowd congestion that had occurred during the first Wembley final the previous year, an all-ticket policy was introduced, with loudspeakers used to assist with crowd control, and at 91,695 the attendance was substantially below the stadium's capacity. No significant disorder was reported either in crowds queueing for the British Empire Exhibition or in those entering the stadium, where extra stone walls had been constructed to partition the terraces and discourage crowds from accessing the pitch. The match predated radio coverage, and newsreel companies were unable to agree a deal with the Football Association to film it, so the 1924 final is the last for which no known video footage exists.

There had been an expectation that the King would attend, but he was represented instead by the Duke and Duchess of York, with Prince Arthur of Connaught, the Prime Minister Ramsay MacDonald and his daughter Ishbel, the Home Secretary Arthur Henderson and the Secretary of State for the Colonies J. H. Thomas also present. The Duke of York, later King George VI, was introduced to the teams before the match by Frederick Wall, the secretary of the Football Association. The referee was Captain W. E. Russell, who had won the Military Cross during the First World War and was one of the linesmen in the 1922 FA Cup final.

The weather in the days before the final had remained unsettled and heavy rain fell in the hours before the match started. Storms caused damage across the south-east, including Epsom Racecourse, and the nearby Indian Pavilion of the British Empire Exhibition "became a lake". As a consequence, the pitch was "greasy and treacherous". The pitch markings were washed away and had to be repainted. Neither captain considered the conditions to be beneficial to his team's style of play.

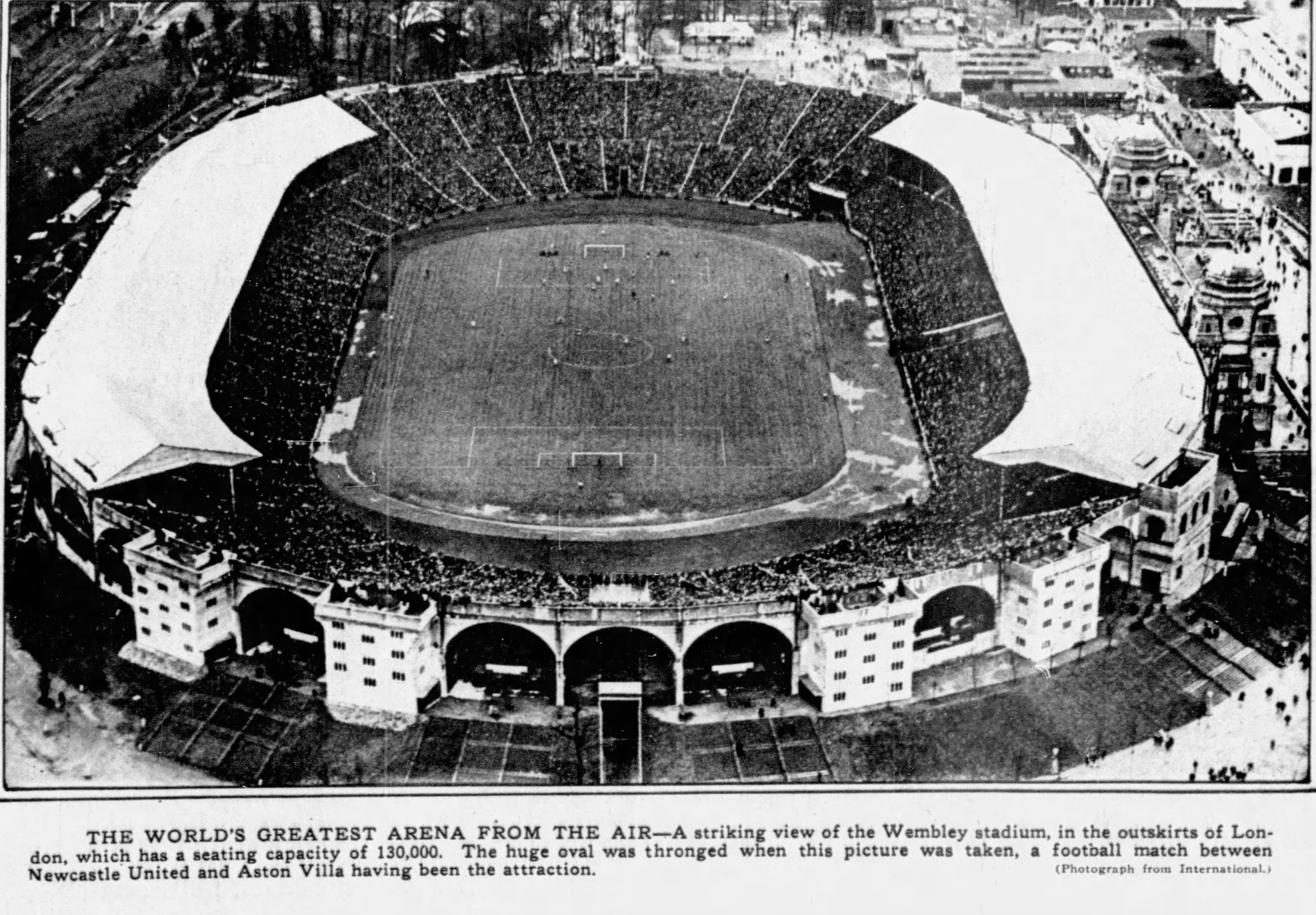
Overhead view of the stadium during the final

Aston Villa won the toss and played with the wind in the first half. Villa's use of the one-back offside trap caught Harris offside on several occasions. Newcastle had the first scoring chance after four minutes, but Harris slipped as he shot from a promising position. Aston Villa had more possession but could not capitalise and their forwards were described as having "no adventure in their shots". Nevertheless, Newcastle's stand-in goalkeeper Bradley made several good saves, notably from Walker and Kirton. Towards the end of the first half, York sent in a cross that forced Bradley to concede a corner. Walker, following in to challenge the goalkeeper, collided with a goalpost and "relapsed like a log". Although he returned to the pitch five minutes later, The Times reported that Aston Villa's inside-left was "never himself again" and Walker stated afterwards that he had been knocked out in the incident.

Although by the second half the rain had stopped and the sun had come out, the Aston Villa players tired as they played into an increasing wind. Bradley made another save from Capewell and Jackson stopped a header from Cowan close to the goal-line. Harris then had a clear chance when he charged down a clearance from Smart, but his shot was "a very weak effort". With the match still goalless as it moved into the closing stages, a flurry of activity took place in the last eight minutes. First Newcastle took the lead with a fine goal by Harris after a combination move begun by Spencer and also involving McDonald and Cowan. Immediately after the restart, Kirton headed a cross from Dorrell off-target from close range. Then Newcastle's outside-left Seymour reached the ball before Smart to score a decisive second goal with a "glorious shot" above Jackson and just under the crossbar from 25 yards.

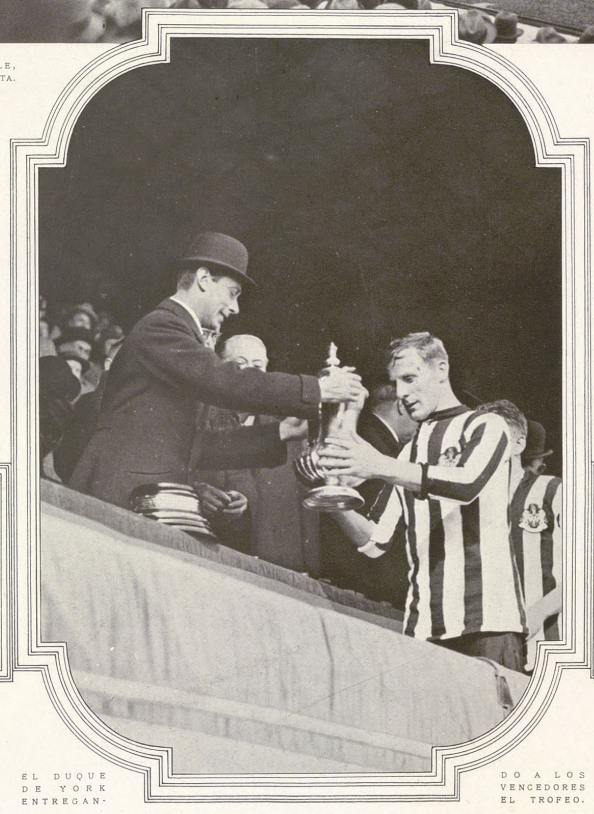
The Duke of York presents the trophy to Newcastle's captain Frank Hudspeth

The Duke of York presented the Cup to Newcastle's captain, Hudspeth, and the crowd dispersed quickly and without incident after the match.

Much attention was paid to the quality of Newcastle's two goals and their goalkeeper's performance, especially in the first half, when Aston Villa had dominated. The Times described Harris as the "outstanding forward on the Newcastle United side" and noted the contribution of Milne, but also commented that Villa were affected by injuries to Walker and Blackburn, who had sustained a knee injury. Hudspeth commended Bradley's "brilliant goalkeeping" and Moss agreed that "some of his saves were remarkable". The Scotsman described the match as "a stirring battle between two well-matched teams", and The Manchester Guardian as "one of the best that has been seen this twenty years". The Daily Telegraph's reporter described the "decorous" match as "a day of drama and thrills and infinite pleasure" and considered Newcastle to be deserving winners, while also praising Bradley's goalkeeping and the tenacious contribution of their left-half, Gibson.

With this victory, Newcastle reversed the scoreline from the final of 1905. By recovering from a heavy League defeat to beat the same opponents in the final the following week, they emulated Blackburn Rovers, who lost 7–1 to Notts County in a League match in March 1891 but then beat them in the Cup final a week later.

=== Match details ===
26 April 1924
15:00 BST

Newcastle United	2–0	Aston Villa
Harris 83'; Seymour 85'	(Report)

Wembley Stadium, London
Attendance: 91,695
Referee: W. E. Russell (Swindon)

Newcastle United
Aston Villa

GK	(England) Bill Bradley
RB	(England) Billy Hampson
LB	(England) Frank Hudspeth (c)
RH	(England) Peter Mooney
CH	(England) Charlie Spencer
LH	(Scotland) Willie Gibson
OR	(Scotland) James Low
IR	(Scotland) Billy Cowan
CF	(Scotland) Neil Harris
IL	(Scotland) Tommy McDonald
OL	(England) Stan Seymour
Manager:
Selection Committee

GK	(England) Tommy Jackson
RB	(England) Tommy Smart
LB	(England) Tommy Mort
RH	(England) Frank Moss (c)
CH	(Scotland) Vic Milne
LH	(England) George Blackburn
OR	(England) Dicky York
IR	(England) Billy Kirton
CF	(England) Len Capewell
IL	(England) Billy Walker
OL	(England) Arthur Dorrell
Secretary-Manager:
(Scotland) George Ramsay

== Post-match ==
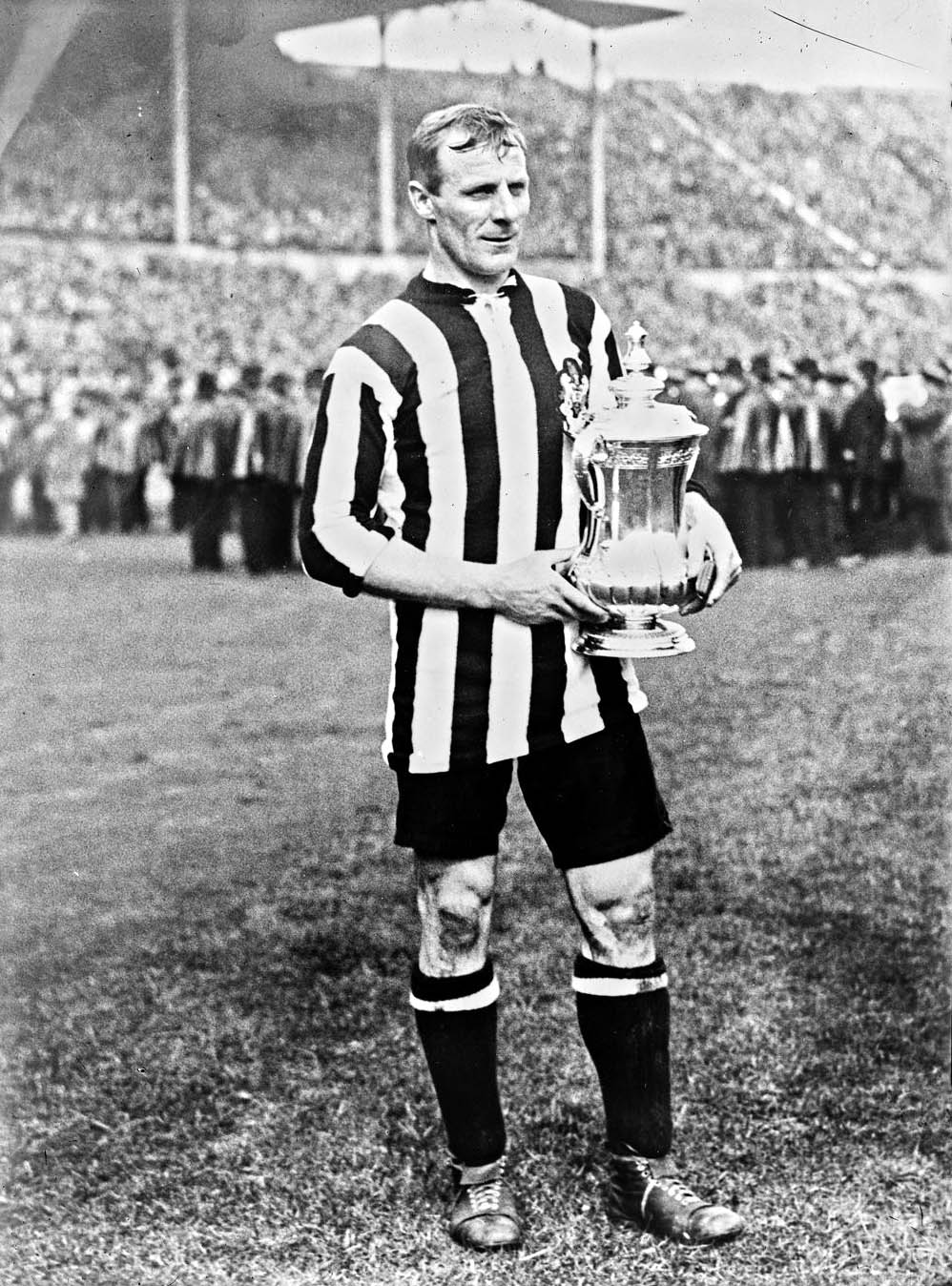
Newcastle United's captain Frank Hudspeth with the FA Cup trophy after the match

The Newcastle team celebrated with a champagne reception at the Hotel Russell on the evening of the final and visited Eastbourne the following day. They returned to Newcastle by train on the Monday after the final, where they were received by the Lord Mayor Stephen Easten and a huge "cheering throng" of supporters before progressing to the Empire Theatre. The Aston Villa team stayed at the Euston Hotel, visited Brighton on the Sunday after the match and returned to Birmingham on the Monday.

On the Wednesday after the final, Aston Villa won their last League match of the season 3–1 at home to Huddersfield Town, three days before Huddersfield pipped Cardiff City to win the title on goal average. Villa finished sixth in the table, the same position as in the previous season, and Newcastle, who had already completed their League programme, finished ninth. The following season, Newcastle lost in the second round of the Cup to Second Division Leicester City, while Aston Villa were beaten by West Bromwich Albion in the third round.

Both teams remained among the strongest in the country in the years after the final. Newcastle won the League championship in 1926–27 and next won the Cup in 1932, when they beat Arsenal in the final. While continuing to challenge into the 1930s, Aston Villa did not win another major honour until they won the FA Cup in 1957, which remains their last success in the competition. They continued to hold or share the record for most FA Cup wins until 1991, when their total of seven was overtaken by Tottenham Hotspur. The success of the all-ticket policy introduced for the 1924 final in improving crowd control was such that this policy was retained for all subsequent Wembley FA Cup finals until the replay of 1982.

Stan Seymour went on to become Newcastle's manager and in 1951 became the first man to win the Cup as both a player and manager of the same club. Billy Walker won the Cup twice as a manager, with Sheffield Wednesday in 1935 and Nottingham Forest in 1959.

Memorabilia from the match have attracted high prices at auction, with programmes selling for thousands of pounds. In 2024, the collection of Newcastle's goalkeeper Bill Bradley, including his winner's medal, sold for more than £10,000.

== Notes ==
1. Some secondary sources report Billy Walker to be Aston Villa's captain in this match, but contemporary reports name Moss, who was the club's regular captain during this period.
