= 1919 Victory Cup =

Tournament details
- Country: Scotland
- Teams: 26

Final positions
- Champions: St Mirren
- Runners-up: Heart of Midlothian

Tournament statistics
- Matches played: 27
- Goals scored: 81 (3 per match)

The Victory Cup was a one-off Scottish football competition held in 1919 to celebrate the end of World War I. It is an unofficial competition in statistical terms, taking place at the end of the 1918–19 season just before official competitions such as the Scottish Cup resumed (the top division of the Scottish Football League continued during the conflict).

The winners of the Victory Cup were St Mirren who defeated Heart of Midlothian 3–0 after extra time in the final at Celtic Park in Glasgow.

== Summary ==
The format was a straight knockout tournament involving clubs in the south and west of Scotland, with each round played as a single match with replays as necessary, and the final at a neutral venue. Matches took place between March and April 1919.

Due to the scarcity of materials and the swift manner in which the competition was organised, no trophy was available to be presented to the winners at the time; St Mirren instead received a 'Victory Cup Shield'. They received a trophy at a later time.

A similar wartime competition was held at the end of World War II, won by Rangers. Coincidentally, the manager of the losing team in that final (Willie McCartney of Hibernian) was the son of John McCartney, the Hearts manager in 1919.

== Results ==
=== First round ===
Team 1	Aggregate	Team 2
Airdrieonians	5–1	Abercorn
Albion Rovers	1–1	Kilmarnock
Celtic	2–0	Vale of Leven
Clyde	2–0	Johnstone
Falkirk	3–0	Dumbarton Harp
Morton	2–1	Clydebank
Motherwell	2–0	Stevenston United
Partick Thistle	4–3	Renton
Queen's Park	2–1	Arthurlie
St Mirren	0–0	Dumbarton

==== Replays ====
Team 1	Aggregate	Team 2
Kilmarnock	0–1	Albion Rovers
Dumbarton	0–1	St Mirren

=== Second round ===
Team 1	Aggregate	Team 2
Albion Rovers	1–3	Celtic
Hamilton Academical	1–5	Rangers
Hibernian	1–0	Ayr United
Motherwell	2–1	Morton
Partick Thistle	2–0	Falkirk
Queen's Park	0–4	Airdrieonians
St Mirren	3–2	Clyde
Third Lanark	1–2	Heart of Midlothian

=== Quarter-finals ===
Team 1	Aggregate	Team 2
Airdrieonians	1–0	Rangers
Hibernian	2–0	Motherwell
Partick Thistle	0–2	Heart of Midlothian
St Mirren	1–0	Celtic

=== Semi-finals ===
Team 1	Aggregate	Team 2
Heart of Midlothian	7–1	Airdrieonians
Hibernian	1–3	St Mirren

== Final ==
26 April 1919

St Mirren	3–0 (a.e.t.)	Heart of Midlothian
Sutherland 99', 115'; Hodges 102'

Celtic Park, Glasgow
Attendance: 60,000
Referee: J. B. Hamilton

St Mirren	Heart Of Midlothian

St Mirren:
GK		William O'Hagan
DF	2	Jack Marshall
DF	3	John Fulton
MF	4	Bob Perry
MF	5	Harold McKenna
MF	6	Harry Anderson
FW	7	Frank Hodges
FW	8	Tom Page
FW	9	John Clark
FW	10	Charles Sutherland
FW	11	James Thomson
Manager:
Johnny Cochrane

Heart of Midlothian:
GK	1	Willie Black
DF	2	Bob Birrell
DF	3	Jock Wilson
MF	4	Bob Preston
MF	5	Bob Mercer
MF	6	Jack Sharp
FW	7	George Sinclair
FW	8	George Miller
FW	9	Andy Wilson
FW	10	Alex McCulloch
FW	11	Willie Wilson
Manager:
John McCartney

== See also ==
- Heart of Midlothian F.C. and World War I
