= Charles Sutherland =

Charles Sutherland may refer to:

- Charles Sutherland (footballer) (1898–?), Scottish footballer
- Charles Sutherland (physician) (1831–1895), American physician and army officer
- Charles D. Sutherland (1879–1957), Canadian architect
- Charles W. Sutherland (1860–1943), American newspaper editor and politician
