= 1918–19 in Scottish football =

Football in Scotland
- Season: 1918–19

1918–19 in Scottish football

Division One champions
- Celtic

Victory Cup winners
- St Mirren

Junior Cup winners
- Rutherglen Glencairn

The 1918–19 season was the 46th season of competitive football in Scotland and the 29th season of the Scottish Football League.

== League competitions ==
=== Scottish Football League ===
| Pos | Team | Pld | W | D | L | GF | GA | GD | Pts |
|---|---|---|---|---|---|---|---|---|---|
| 1 | Celtic (C) | 34 | 26 | 6 | 2 | 71 | 22 | +49 | 58 |
| 2 | Rangers | 34 | 26 | 5 | 3 | 86 | 16 | +70 | 57 |
| 3 | Morton | 34 | 18 | 11 | 5 | 76 | 40 | +36 | 47 |
| 4 | Partick Thistle | 34 | 17 | 7 | 10 | 62 | 43 | +19 | 41 |
| 5 | Motherwell | 34 | 14 | 10 | 10 | 51 | 40 | +11 | 38 |
| 5 | Ayr United | 34 | 15 | 8 | 11 | 62 | 53 | +9 | 38 |
| 7 | Heart of Midlothian | 34 | 14 | 9 | 11 | 59 | 52 | +7 | 37 |
| 8 | Kilmarnock | 34 | 14 | 7 | 13 | 61 | 59 | +2 | 35 |
| 9 | Queen's Park | 34 | 15 | 5 | 14 | 59 | 57 | +2 | 35 |
| 10 | St Mirren | 34 | 10 | 12 | 12 | 43 | 55 | −12 | 32 |
| 10 | Clydebank | 34 | 12 | 8 | 14 | 54 | 65 | −11 | 32 |
| 12 | Third Lanark | 34 | 11 | 9 | 14 | 60 | 62 | −2 | 31 |
| 13 | Airdrieonians | 34 | 9 | 11 | 14 | 45 | 54 | −9 | 29 |
| 14 | Hamilton Academical | 34 | 11 | 5 | 18 | 49 | 75 | −26 | 27 |
| 15 | Dumbarton | 34 | 7 | 8 | 19 | 31 | 58 | −27 | 22 |
| 16 | Clyde | 34 | 7 | 6 | 21 | 45 | 75 | −30 | 20 |
| 16 | Falkirk | 34 | 6 | 8 | 20 | 46 | 73 | −27 | 20 |
| 18 | Hibernian | 34 | 5 | 3 | 26 | 30 | 91 | −61 | 13 |

Source: "1918-1919 SFL - SPFL Archive". SPFL.
(C) Champions

Champions: Celtic

== Other honours ==
=== Cup honours ===
==== National ====
| Competition (Note: The Scottish Cup, Scottish Qualifying Cup (except 1914–15 and 1918–19), and Scottish Amateur Cup were not held during WWI years.) | Winner | Score | Runner-up |
|---|---|---|---|
| Victory Cup | St Mirren | 3 – 0 | Hearts |
| Scottish Qualifying Cup | Bathgate | 2 – 0 | Cowdenbeath |
| Scottish Junior Cup | Rutherglen Glencairn | 1 – 0 (Note: Replay needed.) | St Anthony's |

==== County ====
| Competition (Note: The Border Cup, North of Scotland Cup, Perthshire Cup were not held during WWI years. The Aberdeenshire Cup, Ayrshire Cup, Forfarshire Cup, Stirlingshire Cup, and Southern Counties Cup were not held either after 1914–15.) (Note: The Linlithgowshire Cup and Renfrewshire Cup were not held this season.) | Winner | Score | Runner-up |
|---|---|---|---|
| Dumbartonshire Cup | Clydebank | 2 – 1 | Dumbarton Harp |
| East of Scotland Shield | Hearts | 3 – 1 (Note: Aggregate over two legs.) | Hibernian |
| Glasgow Cup | Rangers | 2 – 0 | Celtic |
| Lanarkshire Cup | Airdrie | 2 – 1 | Hamilton |

=== Non-league honours ===
Senior Leagues

| Division (Note: The Eastern League went into abeyance this season due to lack of clubs still operating in area.) | Winner |
|---|---|
| Western League | Dumbarton Harp |

== Scotland national team ==
There were no Scotland matches played with the British Home Championship suspended due to World War I. Scotland did play four unofficial wartime internationals (known as the Victory Internationals), however, playing home and away against both Ireland and England.

- 22 March 1919, Scotland 2–1 Ireland. Scotland were represented by Jimmy Brownlie, Alec McNair, Bobby Orr, Jimmy Gordon, William Cringan, Jimmy McMullan, Alex Donaldson, James Bowie, Andrew Wilson, George Miller and Alan Morton.
- 19 April 1919, Ireland 0–0 Scotland. Scotland were represented by Jimmy Brownlie, Jack Marshall, Jimmy Blair, Jimmy Gordon, William McNamee, Jimmy McMullan, Alex Donaldson, Johnny Crosbie, James Richardson, Tommy Cairns and Malcolm McPhail.
- 26 April 1919, England 2–2 Scotland. Scotland were represented by Jimmy Brownlie, Alec McNair, Jimmy Blair, Jimmy Gordon, John Wright, Jimmy McMullan, Alex Donaldson, James Bowie, James Richardson, Jimmy McMenemy and Alan Morton.
- 3 May 1919, Scotland 3–4 England. Scotland were represented by Jimmy Brownlie, Alec McNair, Jimmy Blair, Jimmy Gordon, John Wright, Jimmy McMullan, James Reid, James Bowie, Andrew Wilson, Jimmy McMenemy and Alan Morton.

== Other national teams ==
=== Scottish League XI ===
| Date | Venue | Opponents | Score (Note: Scottish League XI's score is shown first.) | Scotland scorer(s) |
|---|---|---|---|---|
| 22 February 1919 | St Andrew's Park, Birmingham (A) | (England) Football League XI | 1–3 | |
| 5 April 1919 | Ibrox Park, Glasgow (H) | (England) Football League XI | 3–2 | |

== See also ==
- 1918–19 Rangers F.C. season
- Association football during World War I
