= Robert Mercer (disambiguation) =

Robert Mercer (born 1946) is an American computer scientist and former co-CEO of the hedge fund Renaissance Technologies.

Robert or Bob Mercer may also refer to:

- Bob Mercer (footballer) (1889–1926), Scottish footballer
- Bob Mercer (politician) (active 1993–2009), Canadian politician
- Robert Mercer (priest) (born 1935), English priest
- Robert Mercer Johnston (1908–1984), Canadian politician
- Robert Mercer Mason, Canadian politician

== See also ==
- Bobby Murcer (1946–2008), American Major League Baseball player
