= William Bradley (footballer) =

English footballer (1893–??)

Personal information
- Full name: William Bradley
- Date of birth: 1 March 1893
- Place of birth: Wardley, England
- Date of death: Unknown
- Height: 6 ft 0 in (1.83 m)
- Position: Goalkeeper

Senior career*
Years	Team	Apps	(Gls)
1909–1910	Dunston Wednesday		
1910–1911	Fatfield Albion		
1911–1912	Jarrow Caledonians		
1912–1913	Portsmouth		
1913–1914	Jarrow		
1914–1927	Newcastle United	133	(0)
1927–1929	Ashington	36	(0)
- North Shields
- * Club domestic league appearances and goals

William Bradley was an English professional footballer who made over 130 appearances as a goalkeeper in the Football League for Newcastle United. Bradley was a member of Newcastle United's 1923–24 FA Cup-winning squad.

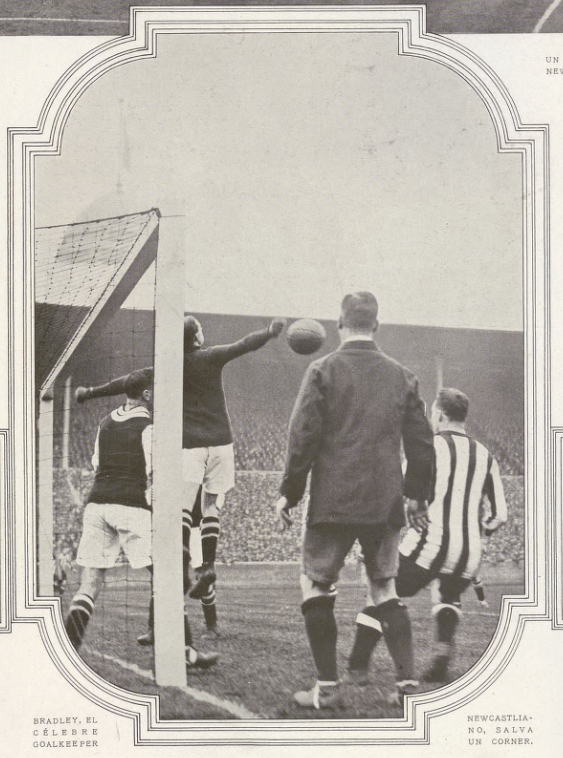
Bradley punching away an Aston Villa corner during the 1924 FA Cup final.

== Personal life ==
Bradley served at home as a gunner in the Royal Garrison Artillery and the Tank Corps during the First World War. Football kept him "largely out of the horrors of the First World War, with the army utilising him for morale-boosting exhibition matches".

== Career statistics ==
Appearances and goals by club, season and competition
Club	Season	League			FA Cup		Total	
Club	Season	Division	Apps	Goals	Apps	Goals	Apps	Goals
Newcastle United	1919–20	First Division	21	0	1	0	22	0
Newcastle United	1921–22	First Division	25	0	2	0	27	0
Newcastle United	1922–23	First Division	27	0	2	0	29	0
Newcastle United	1923–24	First Division	23	0	2	0	25	0
Newcastle United	1924–25	First Division	36	0	3	0	39	0
Newcastle United	1925–26	First Division	1	0	0	0	1	0
Career total			133	0	10	0	143	0

== Honours ==
Newcastle United

- FA Cup: 1923–24
