= Paddy Crossan =

Scottish footballer

Personal information
- Full name: Patrick James Crossan
- Date of birth: 1894
- Place of birth: Addiewell, Scotland
- Date of death: 28 April 1933 (aged 39)
- Place of death: Edinburgh, Scotland
- Position: Defender

Senior career*
Years	Team	Apps	(Gls)
- Addiewell Celtic
- Seafield Athletic
1911	Arniston Rangers		
1911–1925	Heart of Midlothian	283	(11)

International career
1914	Scottish League XI	1	(0)
- * Club domestic league appearances and goals

Patrick James Crossan (1894 – 28 April 1933) was a Scottish professional football defender who played in the Scottish League for Heart of Midlothian.

== Personal life ==
Crossan joined Hearts from Arniston Rangers on 8 Nov 1911, aged 17, alongside Willie Wilson. He lodged at Wilson's family home which was very close to the Tynecastle ground. He was powerful and an extremely fast runner, and supplemented his income occasionally by racing under pseudonyms. Crossan was considered by many to be very good looking and it was said that although he could pass a ball, he could not pass a mirror!

After the outbreak of the First World War in August 1914, Crossan enlisted in McCrae's Battalion of the Royal Scots. Around the same time he was selected for the Scottish League XI with teammates Peter Nellies, James Low and Harry Graham.

Once on active service, he was hit in the leg by shrapnel near Bazentin, France on 9 August 1916, during the Battle of the Somme. The leg was marked for amputation but was saved after being operated on by a German POW surgeon. After recovering back in Britain, Crossan was posted to the 4th Battalion to serve in the Sinai and Palestine Campaign and he was present during the Battle of Jerusalem. He was posted back to the Western Front in 1918 and was gassed in April that year.

He returned to Hearts after the war and featured in another six full seasons, receiving two benefit games and bringing his total number of competitive appearances to over 300 before being release on a free transfer in 1925, aged 31.

Paddy signed for Leith Athletic in August 1925. He scored against his old club in a 7–1 defeat on 19 August 1925.

Paddy married the sister of Harry Wattie on 30 July 1926.

After his retirement from football, he opened Paddy's Bar on Rose Street in Edinburgh. Crossan died of tuberculosis in 1933 and was buried in Mount Vernon Cemetery.
