= Tommy McDonald (footballer, born 1895) =

Scottish footballer

Personal information
- Full name: Thomas Henry McDonald
- Date of birth: 25 September 1895
- Place of birth: Inverness, Scotland
- Date of death: 1969 (aged 73–74)
- Place of death: Newcastle upon Tyne, England
- Height: 5 ft 9 in (1.75 m)
- Position: Inside forward

Senior career*
Years	Team	Apps	(Gls)
?–1919	Inverness Caledonian		
1919–1921	Rangers	5	(1)
1919	→ Inverness Thistle (loan)		
1921–1931	Newcastle United	341	(100)
1931–1933	York City	75	(11)
1933–1934	Goole Town		
- Unsworth Colliery
- * Club domestic league appearances and goals

Thomas Henry McDonald (25 September 1895 – 1969) was a Scottish footballer who played as an inside forward.

== Career ==
McDonald was born in Inverness, Scotland and played for Rangers in his early career; the Glasgow club won the Scottish Football League in both the seasons he was with them, but he only had a minor role in each.

He is best known for his time at Newcastle United who he joined in 1921 and was to spend a decade with the club. At 5' 8" he was one of Newcastle's taller forwards of the time. He made his debut on 5 March 1921 against Middlesbrough. Whilst on Tyneside he made 367 appearances for the club and scored 113 goals. He won the FA Cup in 1924 and the old First Division Championship in 1926–27. He joined York City in May 1931.

== Personal life ==
McDonald served in the Royal Horse Artillery during the First World War.

== Honours ==
Newcastle United

- FA Cup: 1923–24
