= Victory Cup =

Victory Cup may refer to:

- 1919 Victory Cup, a one-off Scottish football competition
- 1946 Victory Cup, a one-off Scottish football competition
- Victory Cup, a one-off minor international rugby league tournament held in Russia
- Victory Cup, a 2013–2015 soccer competition in the National Premier Leagues Tasmania, Australia
- Brisbane Cup, renamed Victory Cup for the 1946 race, an Australian Thoroughbred horse race
