= George Sinclair (footballer) =

Scottish footballer

Personal information
- Full name: George Leckie Sinclair
- Date of birth: 12 December 1884
- Place of birth: Edinburgh, Scotland
- Date of death: 18 December 1959 (aged 75)
- Place of death: Edinburgh, Scotland
- Position: Outside right

Youth career
- Edinburgh King's Park

Senior career*
Years	Team	Apps	(Gls)
1906–1908	Leith Athletic	35	(7)
1908–1921	Heart of Midlothian	326	(46)
1921–1922	Dunfermline Athletic	30	(5)
1922–1924	Cowdenbeath	37	(7)
Total		428	(63)

International career
1910–1912	Scotland	3	(0)
1912–1919	Scottish League XI	2	(0)
- * Club domestic league appearances and goals

George Leckie Sinclair (12 December 1884 – 18 December 1959) was a Scottish footballer who played for Leith Athletic, Heart of Midlothian, Dunfermline Athletic, Cowdenbeath and Scotland.

== Career ==
=== Club ===
A traditional outside right (winger), Sinclair had been a soldier in his teenage years before joining Leith in 1906; he signed for Hearts at the end of the 1907–08 season. He made 192 appearances for the Tynecastle Park club in the Scottish Football League and Scottish Cup prior to the outbreak of World War I. As a reservist, Sinclair had pledged to join up and was one of the first to leave Hearts to go off to the war in August 1914 (later the whole squad enlisted – the first British club to do so; most of the players were with "C" Company of the Royal Scots – Sir George McCrae's Battalion).

Sinclair served with the Royal Field Artillery, saw action at the Battle of Mons and was wounded and discharged in 1915. He returned to play for Hearts again, along with Paddy Crossan and Bob Mercer. In 1919 the club reached the final of the Victory Cup. He made 162 further appearances for the club in the two major competitions.

Sinclair continued to play football into the 1920s, including a spell in the United States.

=== International ===
He won three Scotland caps prior to WWI and also played for the Scottish Football League XI twice, either side of the conflict.

== Later life ==
He went on to run Sinclair's Bar in Montrose Terrace at Abbeyhill until he died in 1959.
