= 1917–18 Aston Villa F.C. season =

English football club season

Aston Villa
1917–18 season
- WW1: X
- FA Cup: WW1

The 1917-18 English football season was Aston Villa's 3rd season of wartime football in England during the First World War.

Between 1915 and 1919 competitive football was suspended in England. Many footballers signed up to fight in the war and as a result many teams were depleted, and fielded guest players instead. The Football League and FA Cup were suspended and in their place regional league competitions were set up; appearances in these tournaments do not count in players' official records.

There were four regional leagues. The Football League Lancashire and Midland sections were split into a principal tournament, consisting of a single league, and then a subsidiary tournament of four groups.

Jack Windmill saw active service in World War I in the Royal Warwickshire Regiment. He rose to the rank of Regimental Sergeant Major and gained the Military Cross and the Distinguished Conduct Medal for bravery.

Tommy Jackson served with the Royal Northumberland Fusiliers during World War I Sam Hardy served as an ordinary seaman in the Royal Navy during the First World War. Tommy Jackson served with the Royal Northumberland Fusiliers during World War I

In March 1918, Joe Bache's Royal Garrison Artillery side beat a team of convalescing soldiers at Home Park, Plymouth in front of 4,000 spectators.

== See also ==
- List of Aston Villa F.C. records and statistics
