= Neil Harris (footballer, born 1894) =

Scottish footballer and manager

Personal information
- Date of birth: 30 October 1894
- Place of birth: Tollcross, Glasgow, Scotland
- Date of death: 3 December 1941 (aged 47)
- Place of death: England
- Height: 5 ft 7 in (1.70 m)
- Position: Centre forward

Senior career*
Years	Team	Apps	(Gls)
–1913	Vale of Clyde		
1913–1920	Partick Thistle	140	(81)
1917	Kilmarnock	1	(0)
1917	St Mirren	5	(7)
1918–1919	Distillery		
1920–1925	Newcastle United	174	(101)
1925–1927	Notts County	49	(23)
1927–1929	Oldham Athletic	39	(16)
1929–1931	Third Lanark	7	(6)
1931–1932	Burton Town		

International career
1924	Scotland	1	(0)

Managerial career
- 1931–1932: Burton Town (player-manager)
- 1932–1934: Distillery
- 1934–1939: Swansea Town
- 1939–1940: Swindon Town
- * Club domestic league appearances and goals

Neil Harris (30 October 1894 – 3 December 1941) was a Scottish footballer, who played as a centre forward. In his later years he managed sides in England, Wales and Northern Ireland.

== Playing career ==
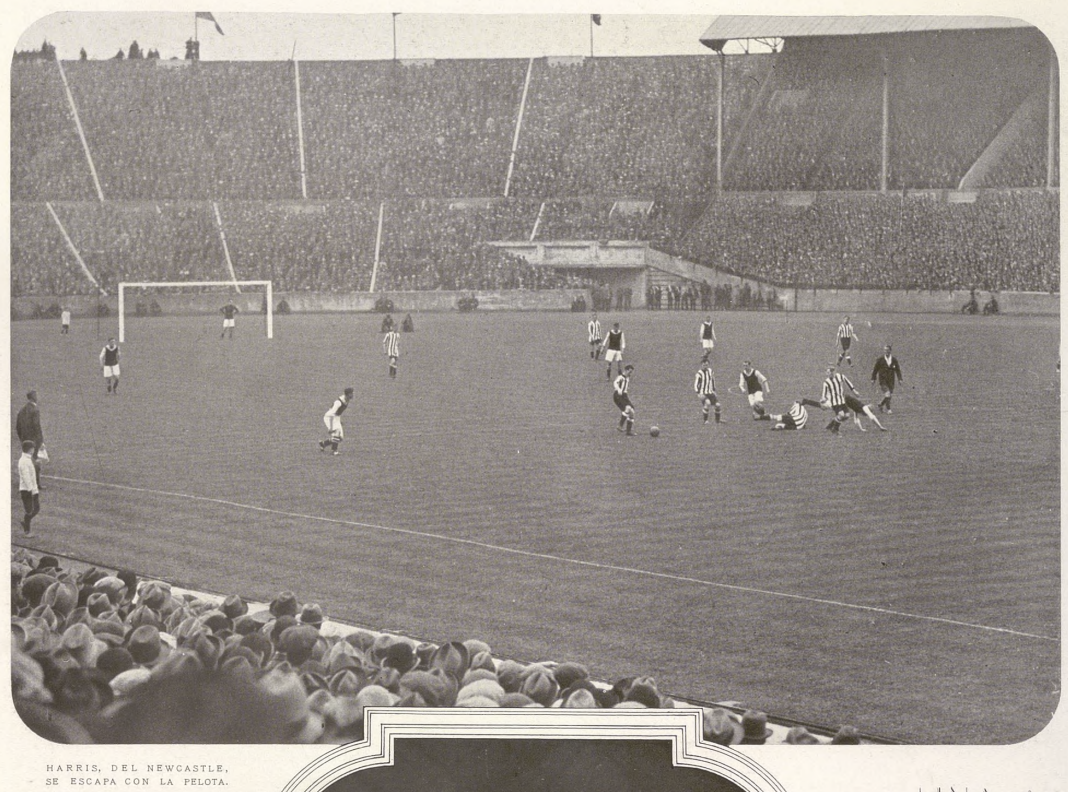
FA Cup Final 1924. Harris (Newcastle) escapes with the ball. Argentine magazine Plus Ultra.

Born in the Tollcross area of Glasgow, Harris began his senior career with Partick Thistle, whom he joined from Vale of Clyde F.C. in 1913. He spent seven seasons with Partick, "guesting" for Distillery and Fulham during World War I before joining Newcastle United for £3,300 in May 1920. He played 174 league games for the Magpies, scoring 87 times. He was a regular scorer in Newcastle's FA Cup campaigns and scored a total of 14 goals in 20 appearances in that competition. He helped them win the 1923–24 FA Cup, scoring the first goal in the final. That season he also earned his first (and only) cap for the Scottish national side, in a 1–1 draw with England at Wembley.

Harris joined Notts County for £3,000 in November 1925, then joined Oldham Athletic in 1927. He returned to Scotland with Third Lanark in 1929 before accepting the position of player-manager at Burton Town prior to the 1931-32 season.

== Managerial career ==
Harris spent one year in charge of Burton then moved to former side Distillery in a purely managerial capacity. He was appointed manager of Swansea Town in 1934 and soon after arriving at the Vetch Field signed his son John, a defender, from Swindon Town. Incidentally, Neil's brother Joshua ('Jack') was also a professional footballer, who played for several years with Leeds United among others; however, they were not related to Joe Harris, also from east Glasgow who played for Partick and Newcastle in the same era.

Five years later Harris moved to his son's former side, after Ted Vizard left Swindon in June 1939. Due to the impending war, he was originally only offered a year's contract but, after negotiation, this was extended to end in March 1941. Just three games into his first season in charge, the Football League programme was abandoned, and Harris remained in charge for the club's season in the South West Regional League. During this season, players were often called up for military duties in the build-up to a game, and every club in the league used "guests" to make up the starting eleven - sometimes players even played under aliases to avoid detection by their officers. Before one game at Bristol City, Harris, now 45, was forced to come out of retirement himself to make up the numbers. He borrowed a pair of boots which were too small, and lost two toenails as the Town lost 5–2.

By the end of the season, it was decided that the club could no longer continue whilst the war did, and Harris was relieved of his duties in August 1940, with the intention of him returning to the hotseat when the war ended. Harris died a year later.

== Honours ==
Newcastle United

- FA Cup: 1923–24
