= Frank Vallis =

English footballer

Personal information
- Date of birth: 5 May 1896
- Place of birth: Bristol, England
- Date of death: September 1957 (aged 61)
- Place of death: Bath, Somerset, England
- Height: 5 ft 11 1/2 in (1.82 m)
- Position: Goalkeeper

Youth career
- Horfield United

Senior career*
Years	Team	Apps	(Gls)
1919–1926	Bristol City	219	(0)
1926–1927	Merthyr Town	2	(0)
- Yeovil & Petters United
- * Club domestic league appearances and goals

Frank Vallis (5 May 1896 — September 1957) was an English footballer who played as a goalkeeper.

== Career ==
Frank Vallis played for Horfield United in the Bristol & Suburban League before signing for Bristol City in April 1919. He was later joined at Bristol City by his brothers Jack Vallis & Arthur Vallis. In May 1926 along with Charlie Sutherland he joined Merthyr Town. Vallis made his debut in a 0–3 defeat at Exeter City on 28 August 1926. Two days later Vallis suffered a broken leg playing in a 3–2 win over Bristol Rovers at Penydarren Park, this unfortunate incident led to the 35yr old player manager Albert Lindon making 33 appearances in goal in 1926–27. After retiring Frank Vallis coached football and cricket at Monkton Combe School in Bath where he was known and remembered with affection as "Pro Vallis". He served as chairman of Monkton Combe parish council.

== Honours ==
with Bristol City

- Football League Third Division South winner: 1922–23
- FA Cup semi-finalist 1920
