= Arniston Rangers F.C. =

Association football club in Scotland

Arniston Rangers
- Full name: Arniston Rangers Football Club
- Nickname: Arni
- Founded: 1878
- Ground: Newbyres Park; Hunterfield Road; Gorebridge
- Capacity: 1,000
- Coordinates: 55°50′41″N 3°3′6″W
- President: John Scott
- Manager: Phil Alexander
- League: East of Scotland League Second Division
- 2025–26: East of Scotland League Second Division, 8th of 15
Home colours	Away colours

Arniston Rangers Football Club are a Scottish football club, based in the town of Gorebridge. They play in the East of Scotland Football League (Second Division), having moved from the SJFA East Region Premier League in 2018. Nicknamed "Arni", they were formed in 1878 and presently play their home games at Newbyres Park, which has room for 1,000 spectators. They wear maroon strips (uniforms). Towards the end of the 2022/23 season Arni got young ultras providing a great atmosphere at Newbyres Park. They also achieved promotion to the EOSFL First Division in the 2022/23 Season. Ground problems at Newbyres meant that some home games during the 2008–09 season were played at Musselburgh.

== Honours ==
Scottish Junior Cup

- Runners-up: 1922–23

=== Other honours ===
- Edinburgh & District League winners: 1953–54
- East Region Division One winners: 1969–70, 1971–72
- Fife & Lothians Cup winners: 1975–76, 1997–98
- East Region Division Two winners: 1994–95
- East of Scotland Junior Cup winners: 1909–10, 1912–13, 1921–22, 1922–23, 1947–48, 1970–71, 1980–81
- Brown Cup winners: 1975–76
- Andy Kelly Cup 2008
- St Michaels Cup 2005–06

== Former players ==
1. Players that have played/managed in the top two divisions of the Scottish Football League or any foreign equivalent to this level (i.e. fully professional league).
2. Players with full international caps.
3. Players that hold a club record or have captained the club.

- (Scotland) Paddy Crossan
- (Scotland) Willie Wilson
- (Scotland) Scott Nisbet
- (Scotland) Darren McGregor
