= Joe Harris (footballer) =

Scottish footballer

Personal information
- Full name: Joseph Harris
- Date of birth: 19 March 1893
- Place of birth: Bridgeton, Glasgow, Scotland
- Date of death: 29 October 1933 (aged 40)
- Place of death: Glasgow, Scotland
- Height: 5 ft 7 1/2 in (1.71 m)
- Position: Half-back

Senior career*
Years	Team	Apps	(Gls)
- Shettleston
–1913	Strathclyde		
1913–1923	Partick Thistle	207	(5)
1923–1925	Middlesbrough	56	(0)
1925–1931	Newcastle United	149	(2)
1931–1933	York City	62	(0)
Total		474	(7)

International career
1921	Scotland	2	(0)
- * Club domestic league appearances and goals

Joseph Harris (19 March 1893 – 29 October 1933) was a Scottish professional footballer who played as a half-back in Scottish football for Shettleston, Strathclyde and Partick Thistle (where he won the Scottish Cup in 1921), and in the English Football League for Middlesbrough, Newcastle United (where he won the League title in 1926–27) and York City.

Harris was capped twice by the Scotland national team in 1921.

He was not related to Neil Harris, also from east Glasgow who played for Partick and Newcastle in the same era.
