= Ian Whitehead =

Scottish footballer (born 1946)

Personal information
- Full name: Ian Whitehead
- Date of birth: 28 December 1946 (age 79)
- Place of birth: Scotland
- Position: Centre forward

Senior career*
Years	Team	Apps	(Gls)
- Vale of Leithen
1969–1970	Queen's Park	23	(15)
1970–1972	Ayr United	24	(11)
1972–1973	Berwick Rangers	22	(4)
1973–1978	Selkirk		

International career
1969–1970	Scotland Amateurs	7	(4)

Managerial career
- 1973–1978: Selkirk (player-manager)
- Hawick Royal Albert
- * Club domestic league appearances and goals

Ian Whitehead (born 28 December 1946) is a Scottish retired semi-professional footballer who played as a centre forward in the Scottish League for Ayr United, Queen's Park and Berwick Rangers. He was capped by Scotland at amateur level and had a successful period in non-League football as player-manager of Selkirk.

== Honours ==
Selkirk

- East of Scotland League: 1974–75, 1975–76, 1976–77
- Scottish Qualifying Cup (South): 1973–74, 1974–75, 1976–77
- King Cup: 1974–75, 1975–76
- East of Scotland Qualifying Cup: 1973–74, 1975–76
