= Frank Hudspeth =

English footballer

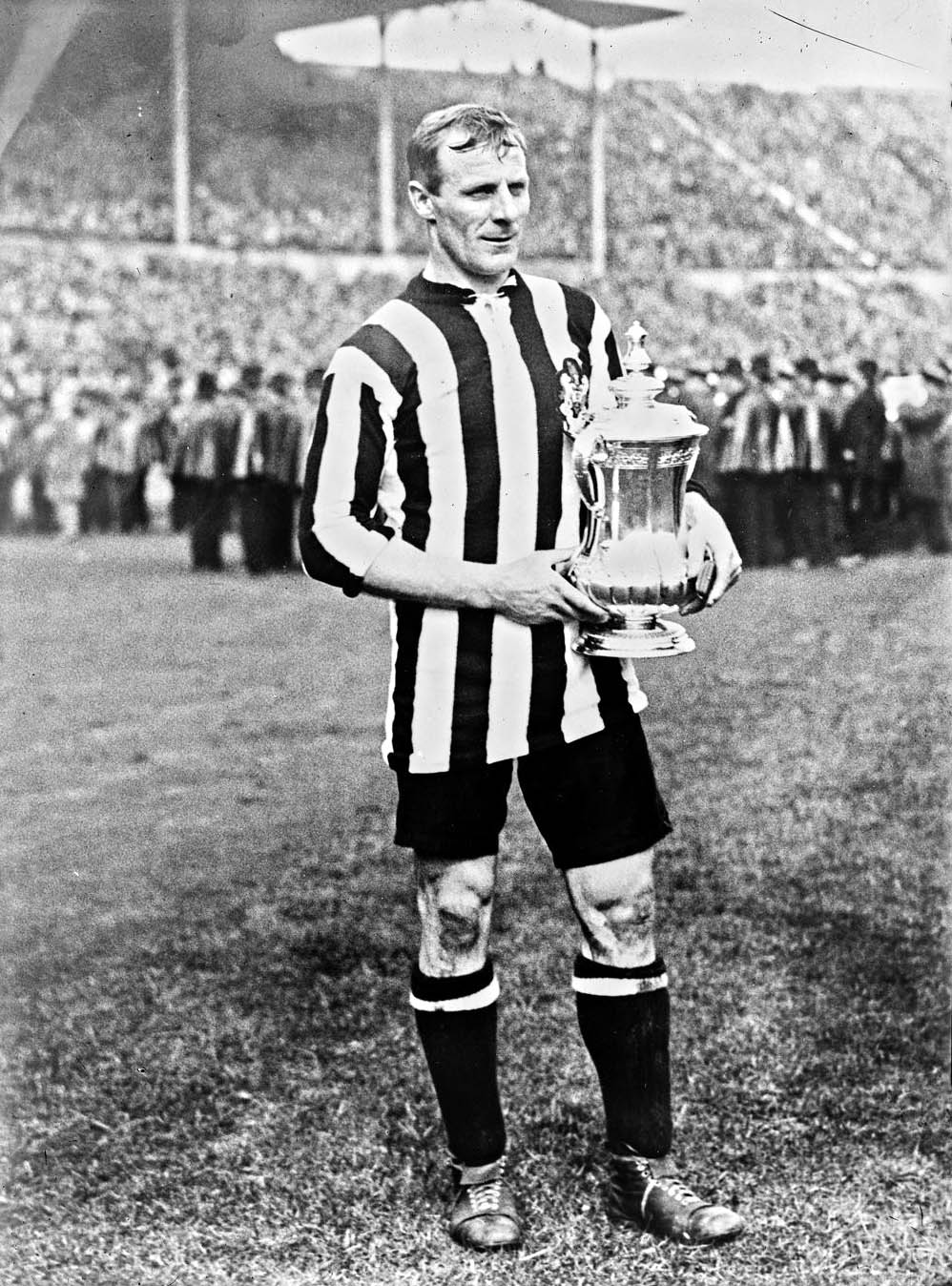

Personal information
- Full name: Francis Carr Hudspeth
- Date of birth: 20 April 1890
- Place of birth: Percy Main, England
- Date of death: 5 February 1963 (aged 72)
- Place of death: Burnley, England
- Height: 1.70 m (5 ft 7 in)
- Position: Left back

Senior career*
Years	Team	Apps	(Gls)
1910–1929	Newcastle United	472	(37)

International career
1925	England	1	(0)
- * Club domestic league appearances and goals

Francis Carr Hudspeth (20 April 1890 – 5 February 1963) was an English footballer, who most notably played as a defender for Newcastle United.

== Career ==
Hudspeth spent nineteen seasons at Newcastle, from 1910 to 1929. This makes him the joint longest servant for the club along with Billy McCracken. During his time at the club he became a popular figure amongst the fans and gained the nickname 'Old Surefoot' for his reliability. He captained the team from 1923 to 1926 but was demoted to vice-captain following Hughie Gallacher's arrival at the club. Hudspeth was also known for his ability to score penalties and 25 of his 37 goals at Newcastle came from the penalty spot.

He is second only to Jimmy Lawrence for making the highest number of appearances for Newcastle, taking part in 472 games. He also represented England at international level.

== Personal life ==
Hudspeth served as an able seaman in the Royal Navy during the First World War.

== Honours ==
Newcastle United

- FA Cup: 1923–24
- First Division: 1926–27
