= Harold McKenna =

Irish footballer

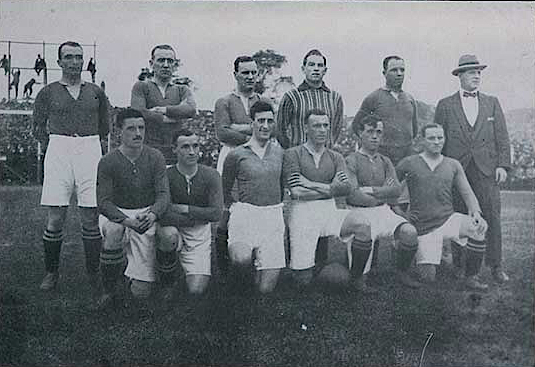
- Third Lanark team during 1923 tour – McKenna kneeling, third from left

Personal information
- Full name: Hugh Harold McKenna
- Date of birth: c. 1895
- Place of birth: Ireland
- Date of death: 1985 (aged 89–90)
- Place of death: Bearsden, Scotland
- Positions: Left half; centre half

Senior career*
Years	Team	Apps	(Gls)
1916–1921	Rangers	40	(0)
1918–1920	→ St Mirren (loan)	50	(0)
1921–1924	Third Lanark	93	(2)
1924–1925	Brighton & Hove Albion	7	(0)
1925–1926	Alloa Athletic	17	(0)
Total		207	(2)
- * Club domestic league appearances and goals

Hugh Harold McKenna (1895–1985) was a footballer who played as a left half or centre half.

== Career ==
Having moved to Scotland from Belfast in Ireland with his family as a young child in about 1898, McKenna was raised amidst the shipyards of western Glasgow (Whiteinch and Yoker) and began his senior football career with Rangers in 1916; his employment in a reserved occupation as an engineer at the yards spared him from being called up to active service with the armed forces during World War I. He played in 24 Scottish Football League matches in his first season at Ibrox, then in 12 in his second (1917–18) as the club finished as champions. McKenna was then loaned to St Mirren for two years, during which he won the 1919 Victory Cup with the Paisley side. Returning to Rangers he found himself down the queue for selection, and though the Gers won the league again in 1920–21, he made only four appearances and is unlikely to have received a medal.

In October 1921 he moved on to Third Lanark, playing regularly for three seasons including in a Scottish Cup semi-final in 1923, and took part in the club's tour of South America in the summer of that year. He transferred to England with Brighton & Hove Albion (then members of the Football League Third Division South) in November 1924, returning to Scotland nine months later with second-tier Alloa Athletic where he played for one season before retiring.
