= Tommy Jackson (footballer, born 1898) =

English footballer

Personal information
- Full name: Thomas Jackson
- Date of birth: 16 March 1898
- Place of birth: Benwell, England
- Date of death: 1975 (aged 76–77)
- Place of death: Sheldon, West Midlands, England
- Position: Goalkeeper

Youth career
- Rutherford College Old Boys

Senior career*
Years	Team	Apps	(Gls)
–	Rutherford Juniors		
–	Benwell Colliery		
–	Durham University		
1919–1930	Aston Villa	172	(0)
–	Kidderminster Harriers		
- * Club domestic league appearances and goals

Thomas Jackson (16 March 1898 – 1975) was an English footballer who played as a goalkeeper. He made close to 200 competitive appearances for Aston Villa, taking over from Sam Hardy when the veteran English international moved to Nottingham Forest.

He travelled to Sweden with Villa on their first foreign tour in 1926. Jackson chose to play the 9-hole golf with Kirton, Mort and Capewell.

Jackson was generally preferred to rival Cyril Spiers for a first team place and featured on the losing side in the 1924 FA Cup Final, but was eventually replaced by Ben Olney. He served with the Royal Northumberland Fusiliers during World War I and attended Durham University before taking up football full-time; his profession after leaving the game was a schoolteacher.

He was mentioned in season 4 episode 2 of Peaky Blinders.

== Honours ==
Aston Villa

- FA Cup runner-up: 1923–24
