= Jack Harris (footballer, born 1891) =

Scottish footballer and manager

Personal information
- Full name: Joshua Harris
- Date of birth: 5 November 1891
- Place of birth: Tollcross, Glasgow, Scotland
- Date of death: 1966 (aged 74–75)
- Height: 5 ft 10 in (1.78 m)
- Position: Winger

Senior career*
Years	Team	Apps	(Gls)
–	Vale of Clyde		
–	Ashfield		
1910–1912	Burnley	57	(5)
1912–1922	Bristol City	205	(26)
1915	→ Partick Thistle (loan)	2	(0)
1918	→ Clydebank (loan)	8	(3)
1922–1925	Leeds United	126	(15)
1925–1927	Fulham	42	(2)
Total		440	(51)

Managerial career
- 1934–1935: Lens
- * Club domestic league appearances and goals

Joshua "Jack" Harris (5 November 1891 – 1966) was a Scottish professional football player and manager. He made over 400 English Football League appearances in the years before and after the First World War.

== Career ==
Born in Glasgow, Harris played as a winger in the Football League for Burnley, Bristol City, Leeds United and Fulham. During World War I he made some appearances in the Scottish Football League which continued to operate, whereas the English leagues were suspended.

He later became a football manager, coaching French team RC Lens between 1934 and 1935.

His brother Neil and nephew John were also professional footballers.
