= George Miller (footballer, born 1894) =

Scottish footballer (1894–1939)

Personal information
- Full name: George Paterson Miller
- Date of birth: 21 November 1894
- Place of birth: Edinburgh, Scotland
- Date of death: 16 February 1939 (aged 44)
- Position: Inside forward

Senior career*
Years	Team	Apps	(Gls)
1913–1914	Civil Service Strollers		
1914–1915	Tranent		
1915–1922	Hearts	133	(31)
1922–1925	Raith Rovers	82	(18)
1925–1931	Hearts	90	(13)
Total		305	(62)

International career
1919	→ Scotland (wartime)	1	(0)
- * Club domestic league appearances and goals

George Paterson Miller (21 November 1894 – 16 February 1939) was a Scottish professional footballer who played as a forward, primarily with Heart of Midlothian.

== Club career ==
Miller was born in Edinburgh and began his football career playing with leading local amateur club Civil Service Strollers whilst training as a law clerk. He then moved on to Tranent of the Junior grade, and represented Scotland at that level in three matches.

He was signed by Hearts in 1915, aged 20 – at his own request, he had an amateur contract in order for him to continue training as a solicitor. By this time World War I was in its second year, and the conflict had a huge impact on Hearts when most of their players enlisted en masse and several were later killed in action.

The Scottish League continued to operate during the war, and Miller replaced Harry Wattie (also a product of Tranent, who was one of the players training for the Western Front and who would ultimately perish at the Battle of the Somme). In one of Miller's first appearances in October 1915, Hearts lost 5–0 at home to Ayr United; however in the very next match they defeated Rangers 4–0 at Ibrox Park with Willie Wilson scoring a hat-trick.

From 1916 Miller served in the 9th Royal Scots Regiment and was promoted to Sergeant. He continued to appear for Hearts when home on leave. At the conclusion of the hostilities in 1918 Miller returned to Edinburgh and was in the Hearts side which was a finalist in the 1919 Victory Cup, and that season he also appeared once for Scotland in one of the unofficial Victory Internationals.

Miller continued to play regularly for Hearts until April 1922 when he found the football was conflicting with his legal career, which he did not wish to give up to turn professional. He was then signed by Raith Rovers in summer 1922, aged 28, to play for them while continuing as a solicitor in Edinburgh. This suited both parties until Raith requested all their players to be based near Kirkcaldy which did not suit Miller's other work commitments.

In January 1925 he was re-signed by Hearts for a fee of £1,200, going on to spend six further seasons at Tynecastle before retiring in 1931, aged 36, having made 243 appearances for Hearts (46 goals) in major competitions over his two spells.

He died of a heart attack in 1939 at the age of 44.
