= Jack Sharp (Scottish footballer) =

Scottish footballer

Personal information
- Place of birth: Scotland
- Position: Inside left

Senior career*
Years	Team	Apps	(Gls)
1915–1916	Bathgate		
1916–1922	Heart of Midlothian	154	(24)
1922–1924	Albion Rovers	57	(9)
1924–1925	Bathgate	30	(7)
Total		241	(40)
- * Club domestic league appearances and goals

John Sharp was a Scottish footballer who played mainly as a inside left. The bulk of his career (seven seasons) was spent with Heart of Midlothian, with the closest he came to winning a trophy being an appearance on the losing side in the final of the 1919 Victory Cup (although a one-off wartime competition, this had some prestige as it was held after World War I had ended, and the regular Scottish Cup was not contested during the war years). Sharp also played for Albion Rovers, and bookended his time in the senior leagues with spells at Bathgate.
