= Jimmy Frew (footballer, born 1892) =

Scottish footballer

Personal information
- Full name: James Harty Frew
- Date of birth: 21 May 1892
- Place of birth: Kinghorn, Scotland
- Date of death: 27 April 1967 (aged 74)
- Place of death: Leeds, England
- Height: 5 ft 9 in (1.75 m)
- Position: Left back

Youth career
- Kilsyth Emmet
- Alloa Athletic
- Newcastle City

Senior career*
Years	Team	Apps	(Gls)
1913–1920	Hearts	20	(0)
1920–1924	Leeds United	96	(0)
1924–1926	Bradford City	48	(0)
Total		164	(0)

International career
1916	Scotland (wartime)	1	(0)
- * Club domestic league appearances and goals

James Harty Frew (21 May 1892 – 27 April 1967) was a Scottish professional footballer who played as a left back.

== Career ==
Born in Kinghorn, Frew played for Kilsyth Emmet, Alloa Athletic, Newcastle City, Hearts, Leeds United and Bradford City.

While at Hearts, he made one appearance for Scotland in an unofficial wartime international in 1916 along with club teammate Willie Wilson. By that time both men had enlisted in 'McCrae's Battalion' of the Royal Scots, and Frew also served in the Royal Garrison Artillery during the conflict.

For Leeds United he made 96 appearances in the Football League, plus three in the FA Cup.

For Bradford City he made 48 appearances in the Football League.

== Sources ==
- Frost, Terry (1988). Bradford City A Complete Record 1903-1988. Breedon Books Sport. ISBN 0-907969-38-0.
