= Bob Perry (footballer) =

Scottish footballer

Personal information
- Full name: Robert Perry
- Date of birth: 1 November 1892
- Place of birth: Airdrie, Scotland
- Date of death: 18 June 1960 (aged 67)
- Place of death: Pawtucket, Rhode Island, United States
- Height: 5 ft 9 1/2 in (1.77 m)
- Position: Center half

Youth career
- King's Park

Senior career*
Years	Team	Apps	(Gls)
1912–1923	Bury	138	(17)
1919	→ St Mirren (guest)	4	(1)
1924–1927	J & P Coats	90	(13)
1927	Fall River	2	(0)
1927	New Bedford Whalers	8	(0)
1927	Hartford Americans	9	(0)
1927–1930	J & P Coats / Pawtucket Rangers	124	(5)
- * Club domestic league appearances and goals

Robert Perry (1 November 1892 – 18 June 1960) was a Scottish association football center half who played in Scotland and England before being banned by the Football Association for match fixing. He then moved to the American Soccer League for the rest of his career.

Perry began his apprenticeship with King's Park F.C. In 1912, he moved to Bury F.C. in The Football League. In 1919 he had a short spell back in Scotland with St Mirren. On 29 May 1923, the FA suspended Perry and several others for life for match fixing three years earlier.

He moved to the United States and in the fall of 1924, signed with J & P Coats. He played 19 games there at the start of the 1926–27 season before moving to Fall River; however, he only saw time in two games and ended the season with the New Bedford Whalers. In the summer of 1927, Perry began the season with the Hartford Americans, but by October the league requested the team withdraw from the league. When they did so, Perry returned to J&P Coats (in 1929, new ownership changed the name of the team to the Pawtucket Rangers) where he played until 1930. He remained in the area with his family for the rest of his life, and died in 1960.
