= Ernest Ellis =

English footballer (1885–1916)

Personal information
- Full name: Ernest Edgar Ellis
- Date of birth: 30 November 1885
- Place of birth: Sprowston, England
- Date of death: 1 July 1916 (aged 30)
- Place of death: near La Boisselle, France
- Position: Right back

Senior career*
Years	Team	Apps	(Gls)
1903–1904	Thorpe Village		
–1907	Norwich St. James		
1907–1908	Norwich City		
1908–1909	Doncaster Rovers	29	(0)
1909	Barnsley	4	(0)
1912–1914	Hartlepools United	74	(0)
1914	Heart of Midlothian	0	(0)
- * Club domestic league appearances and goals

Ernest Edgar Ellis (30 November 1885 – 1 July 1916) was an English professional footballer who played in the Football League for Barnsley as a right back.

== Personal life ==
Prior to becoming a professional footballer, Ellis worked a machine operator in the bootmaking trade. He served as a private in McCrae's Battalion of the Royal Scots during the First World War. On the first day on the Somme, Ellis went over the top in Sausage Valley and was killed in the attack on La Boisselle. He is commemorated on the Thiepval Memorial.

== Career statistics ==
Appearances and goals by club, season and competition
Club	Season	League			National Cup		Other		Total	
Club	Season	Division	Apps	Goals	Apps	Goals	Apps	Goals	Apps	Goals
Doncaster Rovers	1908–09	Midland League	25	0	—		4 (Note: Appearances in Sheffield & Hallamshire Senior Cup)	0	29	0
Doncaster Rovers	1909–10	Midland League	4	0	0	0	0	0	4	0
Doncaster Rovers	Total		29	0	0	0	4	0	33	0
Barnsley	1909–10	Second Division	4	0	0	0	—		4	0
Hartlepools United	1912–13	North Eastern League	37	0	5	0	—		42	0
Hartlepools United	1913–14	North Eastern League	37	0	6	0	—		43	0
Hartlepools United	Total		74	0	11	0	—		85	0
Heart of Midlothian	1914–15	Scottish League First Division	0	0	—		1 (Note: Appearance in East of Scotland Shield)	0	1	0
Career total			107	0	11	0	5	0	123	0
