= James Speedie =

Scottish footballer

James Hodge Speedie (17 November 1893 – 25 September 1915) was a Scottish footballer who played for Hearts.

He was born in Edinburgh and joined Hearts from Tranent. In 1914, he played ten matches on loan at St Mirren between February and May, scoring three goals. He returned to Hearts for the start of the following season and made nine appearances, scoring five goals.

On 14 November 1914, the Queen's Own Cameron Highlanders made an urgent appeal for volunteers at half time in match at Tynecastle against Falkirk. The initial response was disappointing, but at full-time several men stepped forward, including Speedie. He was killed at the Battle of Loos on 25 September 1915.
