= James Low (footballer, born 1894) =

Scottish footballer

Personal information
- Full name: James Low
- Date of birth: 9 March 1894
- Place of birth: Kilbirnie, Scotland
- Date of death: 5 March 1960 (aged 65)
- Place of death: Elgin, Scotland
- Height: 5 ft 6 1/2 in (1.69 m)
- Position: Outside forward

Senior career*
Years	Team	Apps	(Gls)
- Elgin City
–1912	Edinburgh University		
1912–1919	Hearts	95	(22)
1920	Elgin City		
1920–1921	Rangers	4	(0)
1921–1928	Newcastle United	108	(8)

International career
1914	Scottish Football League XI	2	(0)
- * Club domestic league appearances and goals

James Low (9 March 1894 – 5 March 1960) was a Scottish footballer who played as an outside right (winger).

== Early life ==
Low was born in Ayrshire and raised in Elgin.

== Early playing career ==
He began his career at local club Elgin City where he garnered the nicknames, 'Jamie' or 'Jimmy', then moved south to study agriculture at the University of Edinburgh, where he was playing for their football team when scouted by Heart of Midlothian.

Low broke into the strong Hearts first team as a teenager and also represented the Scottish League twice in 1914.

== First world war service ==
In November 1914 he was one of the contingent from the club who enlisted to fight in World War I in McCrae's Battalion. Due to his university education he was coveted by specialist units, and became a 2nd Lieutenant in the 6th Battalion of the Seaforth Highlanders. In 1917 he was wounded in action, sustaining a head injury. At the end of the war he returned to Hearts.

== Later playing career ==
Low in total played in a dozen matches, until his war injury affected his play and he was released on a free transfer.

Low returned home to play for Elgin City, however his condition improved and in March 1920 he was signed by Rangers following a successful trial. He was backup to the established Sandy Archibald at Ibrox Park and featured in only a handful of matches before transferring to Newcastle United in October 1921.

Low remained at Newcastle for seven years and played regularly, making 123 league and cup appearances. He was an FA Cup winner with the Magpies in 1924.

After retiring in 1930 he returned to Elgin to run his family business manufacturing fishing nets. He died in 1960, days before his 66th birthday.

== Honours ==
Newcastle United

- FA Cup: 1923–24
