= Peter Mooney (footballer) =

English footballer

Personal information
- Full name: Edward Mooney
- Date of birth: 22 March 1897
- Place of birth: Newcastle upon Tyne, England
- Height: 5 ft 7 3/4 in (1.72 m)
- Position: Right half

Youth career
- Newcastle Swifts

Senior career*
Years	Team	Apps	(Gls)
1919–1927	Newcastle United	121	(3)
- * Club domestic league appearances and goals

Edward "Peter" Mooney (born 22 March 1897) was an English professional footballer who played as a right half.

== Career ==
Born in Newcastle upon Tyne, Mooney played for Newcastle United, making over 120 appearances in the Football League.

== Honours ==
Newcastle United

- FA Cup: 1923–24
