= Edward F. Mooney =

American philosopher

- Born: 1941 (age 84–85)

Philosophical work
- Era: 21st century Philosophy
- Region: Western philosophy
- School: Continental
- Main interests: existentialism, Søren Kierkegaard, Thoreau

Edward F. Mooney (born 1941) is an internationally recognized Kierkegaard scholar. A retired professor of religion and philosophy, he taught at Sonoma State University, Syracuse University, and in Israel at Haifa and Tel Aviv Universities. As president of the International Kierkegaard Society, he lectured at Vilnia, Frankfurt, Reykjavik, Jerusalem, Ber-Shiva, Tel Aviv, Dartmouth, Johns Hopkins, Auburn, and elsewhere. 2013–2015 he was visiting professor at Tel-Aviv and Hebrew University, Jerusalem, teaching seminars in American Studies on Thoreau. He received his B.A. in philosophy from Oberlin College (1962) and his M.A. and Ph.D. from The University of California, Santa Barbara (1968). His dissertation, written under Herbert Fingarette, linked philosophical themes in literature (Dostoevsky and The Book of Job) with the turn toward persons in the work of John Austin, Peter Strawson, and Iris Murdoch. He was professor of philosophy at Sonoma State University before moving to Syracuse. He has published books on Kierkegaard and several smaller studies on Stanley Cavell, Henry Bugbee, Bruce Wilshire, H. D. Thoreau, and others. He was president of the North American Kierkegaard Society for several years, in which capacity he lectured at Vilnia, Newcastle, Dartmouth, and elsewhere.

He lived in Portland, Maine before moving to Irvine CA. He was a regular contributor to the interdisciplinary on-line journal Zeteo. His writing exemplifies the intersections among philosophy, religion, and poetry. One finds the clarity of Anglophone ordinary language philosophy covering issues native to existential philosophy and religion. In recent years he has turned to Melville as exemplifying an informal, episodic, conversationally developed philosophy well-suited to literary exposition and wisdom, embodying what Cavell calls "passionate speech." His work has appeared in Japanese, Portuguese, French, Hebrew, and Spanish translation.

== Books ==
- Slants of Light: Essays After Dark (privately published)
- Living Philosophy in Kierkegaard and Melville, Bloomsbury 2020
- Excursions with Thoreau: Philosophy, Poetry, Religion, Bloomsbury Academic, 2015.
- Excursions with Kierkegaard: Others, Goods, Death, and Final Faith, Bloomsbury Academic, 2012.
- Lost Intimacy in American Thought: Recovering Personal Philosophy from Thoreau to Cavell, Continuum Books, 2009.
- Kierkegaard's Repetition and Philosophical Crumbs, Editor and Introduction, Oxford World Classics, 2009.
- On Soren Kierkegaard: Polemics, Dialogue, Lost Intimacy and Time, Ashgate, 2007.
- Ethics, Love, and Faith in Kierkegaard: A Philosophical Engagement, Editor, Indiana University Press, 2008.
- Postcards Dropped in Flight, Codhill Press, 2006.
- Wilderness and the Heart: Henry Bugbee's Philosophy of Place, Presence, and Memory, Editor. Foreword by Alasdair MacIntyre, U of Georgia Press, 1999.
- Selves in Discord and Resolve: Kierkegaard's Moral-Religious Psychology from Either/Or to Sickness Unto Death, Routledge, 1996.
- Knights of Faith and Resignation: Reading Kierkegaard's Fear and Trembling, State University of New York Press, 1991.

== Articles ==
Mooney has published over one hundred articles and reviews on Kierkegaard, Nietzsche, Camus, Cavell, Henry Bugbee, Rorty, Pippin, Melville, Thoreau, Henry James, Erik Erikson, Kristeva, and Gilligan (among others). His work has been translated into Japanese, French, Portuguese, Persian, Spanish, and Hebrew. Excerpts from "Postcards Dropped in Flight" were listed under "Best Essays of 1998" (Houghton Mifflin, 1999). He is the most cited author in The Oxford Companion of Kierkegaard, and The Cambridge Companion to Kierkegaard's Fear and Trembling.

== Lectures ==
Mooney has given invited lectures across the USA and in Iceland, England, Germany, Israel, and Lithuania. He was invited to deliver the first Utech Memorial Lectures at the St. Olaf International Kierkegaard Conference, 2011. A Festschrift was held in his honor at the meetings of the American Academy of Religion, 2011. He is Past-President of the North American Kierkegaard Society.

== See also ==
- Alasdair MacIntyre
