= Selkirk F.C. =

Former association football club in Scotland

Selkirk
- Full name: Selkirk Football Club
- Nickname: The Souters
- Founded: 1880
- Dissolved: 2018
- Ground: Yarrow Park, Selkirk
- Capacity: 1,162
- 2018–19: Lowland League, 16th of 16 (resigned)
Home colours

Selkirk Football Club (nicknamed the Souters) was a Scottish football club based in the town of Selkirk. Founded in 1880, they were the oldest established football club in the Scottish Borders. The club was selected as a founder member of the Lowland Football League, which was formed in 2013 by the Scottish Football Association (SFA) as part of a proposed pyramid system. Their home ground was Yarrow Park. Following financial problems, they resigned from the Lowland League during the 2018–19 season and later went out of business due to insurmountable debts and failure to keep their SFA membership.

== History ==
=== The Border pioneers (1880–1899) ===
A committee was formed and an opening game against Hibernian was arranged to launch the new venture. The kick-off was arranged for March 1881, the venue the cricket club, the result a 0–14 reverse, and so was born the oldest football club in the Borders. By 1882 Selkirk were recording good victories against leading Edinburgh clubs, Holyrood (8–2) and St Bernard's (4–1).

Research indicates that by 1883 the club were fielding a second XI, competing in the Second XI Challenge Cup. The same year an extraordinary request was received by the club, Melrose Football Club (later Melrose RFC), invited seven players to represent Selkirk in a new kind of game—seven-a-side rugby. It was members of Selkirk Football Club in the absence of an organized rugby club that represented the town in the world premier of the shortened rugby game—Melrose Sevens! A non-footballing honour also came the way of the club when member A. Stuart was appointed President of the East of Scotland Football Association.

In 1890–91 a new trophy was instituted, the 'Association Borders Counties Challenge Cup' (Border Cup), which Selkirk won at the first time of asking, defeating Hawick Rangers, 4–3, in the final tie.

A highlight of the 1891–92 season was a visit from Queen's Park, who at the time were one of the leading club sides. In front of a large crowd, Selkirk kept the score down to a respectable 4–1 defeat. Defeat by Vale of Gala in the defence of the Border Cup title was the first defeat by a Borders team for seven years.

Season 1892–93 saw the club become a member of the Scottish Football Association and retain the Border Cup.

In the seasons from 1894 to 1899, Selkirk won the Border Cup twice in succession, and were runners-up on two other occasions. The club also recorded their first Border League Championship in 1897, defeating Peebles Rovers 4–0 in a play-off. 1898 saw the team record a 7–2 victory over Morton in the Scottish Qualifying Cup. Wull Brown a key player during this time became the first recorded player to sign for a league club (Heart of Midlothian).

=== Home at last (1900–1939) ===
Season 1903–04 saw the return of the Border Cup to Selkirk, although it took two replays to finally defeat Peebles Rovers at Victoria Park, Innerleithen.

1905-06 saw the team come close to winning its first honour from out with the Borders region, after a 3–1 reverse at the hands of Berwick Rangers in the final of the Consolation Cup. There was some real consolation however, when Selkirk were awarded once more the Border Cup. This time due to the non-appearance of Vale of Leithen come final day in Kelso. Almost of greater significance to matters on the field, Selkirk were able to outbid the let a local farmer offered with to graze sheep on part of the underhaugh by the River Ettrick. This led to the club having their first home after years of nomadic existence—Ettrick Park.

After a period of consolidation due in part to the formation in 1907 of the rugby club in the town the football club won the Border League for the season 1909–10. 1914 saw a repeat of the 1906 Consolation Cup final, again with Berwick Rangers winning, this time 3–2.

With the outbreak of the Great War, most competitive sporting activities were halted until 1918. 16 members of Selkirk Football Club made the supreme sacrifice and many more were to suffer from physical or psychological injuries. Sporting pursuits also took time to recover and forget.

Season 1923–24 saw the first post war trophy paraded at Ettrick Park with a 2–1 victory over Civil Service Strollers in the Border Cup final. Later the same season, the Consolation Cup yet again eluded the 'Souters', this time losing out 2–1 to Coldstream, in front of 2,000 spectators.

The 1920s brought hard times to the woollen trade in the town, and the club relied on the many friends it had made during the preceding years. Celtic, Hibernian and Queen of the South were all willing visitors to Ettrick Park, swelling the coffers and fending off what would be otherwise certain bankruptcy. It was during a visit by a Hearts XI that Bob Mercer died while leading his young charges in order to benefit his former club.

A significant honour was bestowed in the club when former player James Fairgrieve was elected president of the East of Scotland Football Association from 1925 to 1928.

Season 1930–31 saw the return of the Border Cup, after defeating Coldstream 2–1 in the final. The club also managed a creditable 4–4 draw against a strong Hearts side with much to the Selkirk team's relief, legendary centre forward Barney Battles, Jr. acting as referee.

Selkirk were able to retain the Border Cup at the climax of the 1931–32 season, defeating Berwick Rangers at Raidstane Park, Galashiels. By this time the game was booming in the town, with regular attendances of over 1,000 recorded.

1933 witnessed a famous Scottish Cup tie, with Selkirk defeating all-professional Bo'ness 3–0 courtesy of a 'spectacular' Jimmy Tranter hat-trick.

The opening of a new pavilion at Ettrick Park was celebrated by the visit of Queen of the South in 1937.

Season 1938–39 saw the Border Cup return once more to Selkirk, this time requiring a replay and extra time. Teenager Sandy Adamson scoring the winner in a 3–2 win over Penicuik Athletic.

As the 1939–40 season kicked off, World War II broke out. A directive from the SFA immediately suspended all non-Army or junior competitive games heralding the end of another era in the club's history.

=== Superstars and World Cup opponents (1940–1969) ===
The end of the War did not initiate an immediate restart to footballing activities. Many players and members were not released from military service until some time after hostilities ended. Following a meeting in the Selkirk Institute in March 1946, a new committee was formed and planning for the future began. The playing staff suffered as a result of the war, significantly highly promising players Sandy Adamson was drowned on active service, and John Douglas was unable to play due to his war injuries. However, on a more positive note, many of the youth players had obtained great experience while playing for their Service teams. In addition, two young lads, Davie Grieve and Bobby Johnstone emerged from the Parkvale Rovers primed and ready for action.

In October 1946, the newly revived Selkirk F.C. defeated Queen of the South on the Toll Field in front of 1,500 spectators. Unfortunately a major trophy eluded the team once more, this time losing to professional Gala Fairydean, 5–2, in the East of Scotland Cup final. This year also saw Bobby Johnstone and Eck Piercy sign for Hibernian. The transfer fee being the promise of a home friendly. This game duly took place in October 1947, Selkirk losing 11–2. Just before this, in September 1947, in the held-over East of Scotland Qualifying Cup final replay, Selkirk defeated Leith Athletic, 4–0, at Ettrick Park. A huge crowd turned out for the Wednesday night game and the final whistle brought great scenes of celebration, which were only slightly muted by the non-appearance of the cup. This was the first time an amateur team had taken the trophy out of Edinburgh.

=== The golden era (1970–1979) ===
The 1970s was definitely the epoch for the club, seeing 10 trophies arrive at Ettrick Park in the five seasons from 1973 to 1978. After dropping down to the amateur leagues in 1967, it was not until season 1971–72 that Selkirk would regain the confidence (and the finances) to return to senior football, and what a return it would be. The five years of glory commenced with the release of Ian Whitehead from Berwick Rangers in 1973, Chalky as he was universally known was snapped up by Selkirk and became player/manager later in the season. Whitehead became the architect of the most fruitful period of success in the club's history and soon bagged the first trophy in 28 years for Selkirk FC. Trophy #1 23 March 1974 East of Scotland Qualifying Cup (Selkirk 2 Heriot Watt University 0). Trophy #2 2 and 9 November 1974 Scottish Qualifying Cup (South) Selkirk 2 St Cuthbert Wanderers 1/St Cuthbert Wanderers 1 Selkirk 2 – Selkirk win 4–2 on aggregate. Trophy #3 7 May 1975 East of Scotland League Championship 1974–75. Trophy #4 13 May 1975 King Cup Selkirk 0 Hawick Royal Albert 0 (a.e.t. 0–0 Selkirk won 4–2 on penalties). Trophy #5 7 November 1975 Scottish Qualifying Cup (South) Selkirk 6 Civil Service Strollers 2. Trophy #6 8 April 1976 East of Scotland Qualifying Cup Hawick Royal Albert 1 Selkirk 3. Trophy #7 22 April 1976 East of Scotland League Championship 1975–76. Trophy #8 22 May 1976 King Cup Selkirk 5 Vale of Leithen 4 – a Grand Slam of trophies for 1975–76. Trophy #9 26 May East of Scotland League Championship 1976–77. Trophy #10 26 November 1977 Scottish Qualifying Cup (South) Selkirk 2 Civil Service Strollers 1.

Throughout this period Selkirk had the services of many of the finest players in the Scottish Borders and frequently fielded four Amateur Scottish Caps in the side Ian Whitehead, Sandy Bell, Moray McLaren and Davie Watkins.

December 1977 started on a remarkable note for Selkirk. As the support slowly filtered in to Ettrick Park for a league match against lowly Eyemouth United, the sharp shrill of the referee's whistle sounded the start of the game. Ian 'Chalky' Whitehead meanwhile had spotted the goalkeeper off his line in conversation with his centre-half. Brian 'the bear' McConnell kicked off for Selkirk and Chalky hammered the ball into the top corner of the net. Referee George Smith timed the goal at five-seconds, a second quicker than the then current record published by the Guinness Book of Records.

Selkirk's Golden Era came to an end when Ian Whitehead was enticed back into Scottish League Football as a coach with Second Division Berwick Rangers. Ian never concealed his desire to progress in management and possibly his greatest achievement was to manage the 'wee Gers' to the Championship title and to be promoted for the first time in their history.

=== Resurgence follows hard times (1980–1999) ===
The club have appeared in the Scottish Cup on numerous occasions, with their most notable appearance having been in 1984–1985, when they were beaten 20–0 by Stirling Albion. This was the largest winning margin in British senior football during the 20th century. The whole match was recorded in full by the BBC for a documentary on the Scottish Cup. In truth, the club was starting to fall behind, as they had dropped out of the East of Scotland League temporarily, and had to field a makeshift side for the Scottish Cup match in order to maintain their qualification for the competition. The players took to the field in high hopes but were often defeated by their opponents. .

=== East of Scotland ===
Selkirk won promotion to the East of Scotland Premier Division in season 2005–06 after some spirited performances, including a 6–1 win against local rivals Gala Fairydean. In season 2006–07 the club consolidated their place in the top flight.

Season 2007–08 resulted in relegation from the Premier Division, but they were reprieved when Annan Athletic left to fill the Third Division position vacated by the departing Gretna. Buoyed by this unexpected turn in fortunes, the club ended the campaign on a high by capturing their first silverware in 30 years, triumphantly lifting the Image Printers' Cup with a 3–1 victory over the much-fancied Lothian Thistle. Manager Fraser Lothian shocked the club shortly afterwards by leaving his post. It was confirmed that former Berwick Rangers player and local stalwart Paul 'Paulie' Brownlee would be taking over the managerial reins for the 2008–09 season. Brownlee stuck to a policy of building a squad of predominantly local players.

In season 2008–09, the team finished the campaign in 10th position. Towards the culmination of the fixture list, Selkirk had recorded unexpected home and away victories over the reigning league champions, Whitehill Welfare, to avoid the dreaded trapdoor and ensure that Premier Division football would be witnessed at Yarrow Park for another year.

In season 2009–10, former chairman Roger Arnold and ex-player and manager of Selkirk Jackson Cockburn were awarded life-memberships of the club at a special lunch held at Yarrow Park. The club finish in 10th position in the Premier Division.

In season 2010–11, the club received a SFA Standard Quality Award for services to grass roots football. Selkirk took the phrase 'down to the wire' to a new level in the last game of the season. After 14 games without a victory, results went for them in the other games and thanks to a Des Sutherland hat-trick, relegation was avoided at the final whistle with a 3–2 victory over Tynecastle.

In season 2011–12, after six seasons of narrow squeaks and great escapes, Selkirk finally failed to remain in the Premier Division, ending the season last place in the table returning to the First Division.

Selkirk started season 2012–13 well with excellent pre-season results, drawing with the Celtic and Hibernian under-20s sides and pushing Cowdenbeath to overturn a 0–2 deficit in the last 15 minutes of the game. However, despite this bright start the team ended up in the lower half of the league. As an initiative to develop players for the future, the club entered for the first time an under-19 team into the East of Scotland League Off the park the committee concentrated on meeting the new licensing requirement to allow the club entry into competitions like the Scottish Cup and the Lowland League. These efforts resulted in the funding (with the assistance of the Scottish Football Partnership) and installation of a new 100 seater stand and other ground improvements in order to qualify for SFA audit.

=== Lowland League and decline ===
Selkirk started season 2013–14 as a founding member of the Lowland Football League, leaving the East of Scotland League after an association stretching back to 1923. On 19 August 2013, Selkirk became the first Borders football club to be audited and meet the criteria to hold an SFA Licence. Following a defeat by Gretna 2008 on 12 October 2013, the ninth in a row, manager Mike McKinnon announced his resignation giving the club two weeks notice of his intentions. He was replaced within a week by Hutchison Vale under-21 squad manager and Hibernian youth coach Steve Forrest. The new manager came to Selkirk with a four-year plan, so it was unsurprising that a 1–0 backs-to-the wall win away to Whitehill Welfare and a 5–1 drubbing of local rivals, Gala Fairydean Rovers were the only on-field highlights for the rest of the term. A deal towards the end of the season was struck with EDUSport Academy to field some of their French nationals to provide match experience in Scotland. Yannis Lamghri, Benji Huteau, Jordane Orain and Julio Tonelle featured for the club in the second half of the season.

The club started season 2014–15, its second season in the SLFL, with a successful pre-season, competing well, but ultimately losing to Stirling Albion and Falkirk before beating a Hibernian XI 3–1 and demolishing promising Junior Side Dalkeith Thistle 7–0. The biggest surprise however was the signing of ex-Hibernian, Birmingham City, Lokomotiv Moscow and Scotland national football team striker, Garry O'Connor. Selkirk made national headlines again at the start of the 2015–16 season, this time with the signing of Scottish football's first ever poet in residence, Thomas Clark.

Steve Forrest was sacked as Selkirk manager on 28 October 2015, with Garry O'Connor taking temporary charge.

Following financial problems and having been fined for failing to fulfil two fixtures, Selkirk resigned from the Lowland League in August 2018.

== Stadium ==
Yarrow Park, was the home of Selkirk F.C., which opened in 2000 after Selkirk left their former ground, Ettrick Park. It had a capacity of 1,000 with 100 seats. It is located near the town's rugby ground, Philiphaugh Stadium.

== Hall of Fame ==
- Bobby Johnstone
- Bob Mercer

Famous players produced by the club include two Scottish internationals – Selkirk-born Bobby Johnstone, who was a member of Hibernian's Famous Five, and Bob Mercer, who played for Heart of Midlothian.

== Grounds ==
Ettrick Park Ground Developments

1906: A pavilion was erected at the entrance to the main gate, consisting of a large changing room for the home team, a much smaller one for the visitors and a 'doo-cot' for the match official. Light was provided by a paraffin lamp. Post match bathing was provided by bucket from the river Ettrick. Later a wooden open fronted 'press-box' was constructed on the embankment near to the main gate. This building had seating accommodation for three at a crush, and was subscribed on a first come, first save basis.

1937: The windowless 1906 pavilion was replaced with a new imposing structure providing spacious dressing room and committee accommodation.

1946: After war use, the park was completely levelled and re-turfed using voluntary labour supervised by groundsman Len Scott.

Circa early 1970s: A small steel framed enclosure was constructed in front of the changing rooms over existing concrete terrace.

1975: New Pavilion/clubhouse constructed by converting and joining two surplus buildings purchased from the local education authority from Netherdale, Galashiels. The building was installed on the south side of the pitch opposite the old pavilion and stand. This was a task made simpler by having a secretary, Bert Ballantine, who was also a councillor, and player and future manager Moray McLaren who happened to be a chartered surveyor.

1978: A further extension described as a 'luxurious' lounge costing £20,000 was opened by the then leader of the Liberal Party David Steel.

Yarrow Park Ground Developments

2012: New terrace installed on south west side of pitch

2013: New Turnstile gate & ticket office installed at south gate

2013: 100 seater stand constructed on north east side of pitch

2013: Pitch 'B' fenced in to SFA standard

2013: New ticket office/snack bar installed at east gate.

Grounds of Selkirk FC (dates before 1906 are approximate)

Cricket Field (1880–1891), Angle Field (1891–1892), Linglie Field (1892–1900), Raeburn Meadow (1900–01), Cricket Field (1901–1906), Linglie Field (1906), Ettrick Park (1906–Feb 2000), Yarrow Park (Feb 2000–present). (The Toll Field was used just after WWII while Ettrick Park was undergoing post war remedial work.)

== Club colours ==
1880–1891: blue and white stripes. 1891–97: blue shirts, white shorts. 1897–1910: black & sky blue stripes, white shorts. 1910–1922: green & white. 1922–31: black & white hooped shirt and white shorts. (1931–48 tbc.) 1948–1954: white shirt, navy shorts. 1954–57: green with yellow sleeves, white shorts. 1957–59: blue with white sleeves, white shorts. 1959–60: amber shirt, black shorts. 1960–61: white with thin red stripes, white shorts. 1961: white shirt and blue shorts. 1970–72: all maroon 1973–80s: all blue with white trim. Circa 2000–2010: white shirt and blue shorts. Circa 2010–2018: all blue with white trim.

== Honours ==
Border League: 1896–97, 1897–98, 1902–03

Border Cup: 1873–74*, 1875–76*, 1878–79*, 1879–80*, 1892–93, 1894–95, 1896–97, 1903–04, 1904–05, 1905–06, 1923–24, 1930–31, 1931–32, 1938–39.

Paul Shield: 1896–97, 1898–99, 1901–02

East of Scotland League: 1974–75, 1975–76, 1976–77. (Runners-up 1926–27, 1931–32, 1972–73, 1978–79.)

Scottish Qualifying Cup (South): 1974, 1975, 1977.

King Cup: 1974–75, 1975–76.

East of Scotland Qualifying Cup: 1946–47, 1973–74, 1975–76, 2007–08 (As Image Printers Cup).

* Note the BAFL record that a Selkirk team won A 'Border cup' during the years 1873–74, 1875–76, 1878–79, 1879–80. Clarification is required as which Selkirk team this was and what cup was won.

== Sources ==
- A Century of Soccer in Selkirk, 1880–1980 by D.C. Graham Bateman
- From Mossille to the San Siro: The History of Gala Rovers by Cubbs Turnbull
- "Soccer in Selkirk": Article by Keith Anderson in Scottish Football Historian magazine, No. 5 (Mar 1983)
- The fabulous Five Years: Souvenir Brochure edited by Keith Anderson for the 125th anniversary of Selkirk Football Club.
- "Correspondence from Scottish Borders Council, Environment and Infrastructure" 22 July 2013.
