= Willie Wilson (footballer, born 1894) =

Scottish footballer

Personal information
- Full name: William R Wilson
- Date of birth: February 1894
- Place of birth: Edinburgh, Scotland
- Date of death: 1956
- Place of death: Cheshire, England
- Position: Outside forward

Youth career
- Shaftesbury
- Dalry Primrose

Senior career*
Years	Team	Apps	(Gls)
1911–1912	Arniston Rangers		
1912–1924	Hearts	247	(67)
1916	→ Leeds City (guest)		
1923–1929	Cowdenbeath	197	(37)
Total		444	(104)

International career
1915	Scottish League XI	1	(0)
1916	Scotland (wartime)	1	(0)
- * Club domestic league appearances and goals

William R. Wilson (1894–1956) was a Scottish professional footballer, who played as an outside left (winger), primarily with Heart of Midlothian.

== Club career ==
Wilson was born in 1894 in Edinburgh and lived at McLeod Street, close to Tynecastle Park; he was a Hearts supporter in childhood. He began his career with local juvenile sides before joining Arniston Rangers of the Junior grade, and represented Scotland at that level in two matches.

He was signed by Hearts in 1912, aged 18, alongside Paddy Crossan who became a lodger at the Wilson family home. Wilson made his debut in April 1912 in a 2–0 loss to Airdrieonians. In the following season his returns in the league were an impressive 15 goals from 23 games as the club placed fourth.

He continued to feature regularly for Hearts in 1913–14, when they finished fourth again, and at the outset of 1914–15 they began strongly and were top of the league in November. By that point World War I was intensifying, and in the wake of public scrutiny over the willingness of sportsmen to join up for the armed forces, the squad enlisted en masse into what became known as McCrae's Battalion. Wilson signed up, but was not initially called to active duty owing to a dislocated shoulder sustained in a match some time earlier. The Scottish League continued to operate, but Hearts were depleted and had to settle for the runners-up spot.

In 1915–16 military commitments began to take hold, and soon after scoring a hat-trick in a 4–0 away win over Rangers Wilson was called up to join his unit. From then on he made occasional appearances for Hearts when possible and also had a spell as a guest player for Leeds City.

While several of his teammates fought and perished at the Battle of the Somme, the problematic shoulder meant that Wilson could not fire a rifle effectively, and he was held on reserve. He did see frontline action in 1917 at Arras and was wounded. At the conclusion of the hostilities in 1918 Wilson returned to Edinburgh and was in the Hearts side which reached but lost the final of the 1919 Victory Cup.

For the next four seasons he was once again an important component of the team, averaging 34 league games and 6 goals each campaign despite being troubled by his shoulder injury. In July 1923 he received a benefit match, and a few weeks later left the club having amassed 273 competitive appearances and 72 goals for Hearts.

Wilson moved on to second-tier Cowdenbeath and in his first season helped them to gain promotion. His top-level career thus resumed, as Cowden achieved an all-time high league placing of fifth in 1924–25 and retained their divisional status up to Wilson's final season, 1928–29 (and for several years beyond).

== International career ==
Wilson was selected for the Scottish League XI in March 1915 with club teammate Jimmy Frew. While enlisted he played for the 'Army in Scotland' against the 'Army in England', and in May 1916 he was selected for Scotland in an unofficial wartime international (the only game of this nature during the course of the war itself). He was never capped at full level in an official fixture.

== Later life ==
After retiring from football, Wilson ran a sweet shop and relocated to the north-west of England to work in his trade of tinsmith. He died in 1956.
