= Harry Graham (footballer) =

Scottish footballer

Personal information
- Full name: Harry Graham
- Date of birth: 16 December 1887
- Place of birth: Edinburgh, Scotland
- Date of death: 1940 (aged 52–53)
- Place of death: Scotland
- Height: 5 ft 8 1/2 in (1.74 m)
- Position: Inside forward

Senior career*
Years	Team	Apps	(Gls)
19??–1908	Granton Oakvale		
1908–1910	St Bernard's		
1910–1911	Bradford City	11	(0)
1911–1912	Birmingham	12	(4)
1912–1913	Raith Rovers		(6)
1913–1920	Heart of Midlothian	146	(46)
1920–1924	Leicester City	110	(14)
1924–1925	St Bernard's		
1925–1926	Reading	12	(0)

International career
1914	Scottish Football League XI	1	(0)
- * Club domestic league appearances and goals

Harry Graham (16 December 1887 – 1940) was a Scottish professional footballer who played in the Scottish Football League for Raith Rovers and Heart of Midlothian, and in the Football League for Bradford City, Birmingham, Leicester City and Reading. He played as an inside forward.

== Career ==
Graham was born in Edinburgh. He began his career in the Junior grade and was selected twice for Scotland at that level in 1908. He also played for St Bernard's before moving to England to sign for Bradford City in April 1910. He played 11 First Division games without scoring, and in October 1911 joined Second Division club Birmingham. Graham played 12 times for Birmingham, scoring four goals, but he was principally a playmaker, and the club's need was for a goalscorer. In September 1912 he returned to Scotland and signed for Raith Rovers, for whom he appeared in the 1913 Scottish Cup Final.

Graham moved on at the end of the season to Heart of Midlothian, who were looking for a replacement for the recently retired Bobby Walker. Before and during the First World War, Graham scored 41 goals from 120 appearances in the Scottish League, and the League rewarded him with selection for a representative match against the Southern League in October 1914. A qualified dentist, Graham was turned down for "McCrae's Battalion" in 1914 because of asthma, but during the 1916–17 season he was conscripted into the Army, and served with the Royal Army Medical Corps and as a private with the Gloucestershire Regiment. On his return to Hearts, he struggled to get into the first team, and in December 1920 he returned to England and joined Leicester City.

Despite his age – it was around the time of his 33rd birthday when he joined the club – Graham played more than 100 games for Leicester in the Second Division, which he followed with six months with former club St Bernard's and another return to England, where he contributed to Reading's championship of the Third Division South in the 1925–26 season.
