= Charles Sutherland (footballer) =

Scottish footballer

Charlie Sutherland
Personal information
- Full name: Charles Christison Sutherland
- Date of birth: 4 February 1898
- Place of birth: Brechin, Scotland
- Height: 5 ft 7 in (1.70 m)
- Position: Inside left

Youth career
- Petershill

Senior career*
Years	Team	Apps	(Gls)
1916–1917	Third Lanark	28	(3)
1917–1917	Abercorn	?	(?)
1917–1918	Clydebank	20	(10)
1918–1920	St Mirren	58	(6+)
1920–1922	Millwall	57	(8)
1922–1926	Bristol City	103	(23)
1926–1927	Merthyr Town	34	(6)
1927–1928	St Mirren	10	(5)
- * Club domestic league appearances and goals

Charles Christison Sutherland (born 4 February 1898, date of death unknown) was a Scottish footballer who played as an inside left. He was born in Brechin, Scotland.

== Career ==
Sutherland played for Third Lanark, Abercorn, Clydebank and St Mirren in Scotland. Sutherland joined Millwall in July 1920 and made his debut in their first ever League match. Alex Raisbeck signed Sutherland in August 1922 for Bristol City. Sutherland joined Merthyr Town in May 1926 along with Frank Vallis.

== Honours ==
- Football League Third Division South winner: 1922–23 with Bristol City.
