= Harry Wattie =

Scottish footballer (1891–1916)

Personal information
- Full name: Henry Benzie Wattie
- Date of birth: 3 June 1891
- Place of birth: Edinburgh, Scotland
- Date of death: 1 July 1916 (aged 25)
- Place of death: near Ovillers-la-Boisselle, France
- Height: 5 ft 8 in (1.73 m)
- Position: Forward

Youth career
- Tranent Juniors

Senior career*
Years	Team	Apps	(Gls)
1913–1915	Heart of Midlothian	57	(17)
- * Club domestic league appearances and goals

Henry Benzie Wattie (3 June 1891 – 1 July 1916) was a Scottish professional footballer who played in the Scottish League for Heart of Midlothian as a forward.

== Personal life ==
Wattie was the youngest of five brothers and attended Boroughmuir High School. After serving four years in the Territorial Force, Wattie enlisted as a private in McCrae's Battalion of the Royal Scots during the First World War and was killed in Sausage Valley on the first day on the Somme. He is commemorated on the Thiepval Memorial.

== Career statistics ==
Appearances and goals by club, season and competition
Club	Season	League			Scottish Cup		Total	
Club	Season	Division	Apps	Goals	Apps	Goals	Apps	Goals
Heart of Midlothian	1913–14	Scottish First Division	24	6	1	0	25	6
Heart of Midlothian	1914–15	Scottish First Division	33	11	0	0	33	11
Career total			57	17	1	0	58	17
