= Bob Mercer (footballer) =

Scottish footballer

Personal information
- Full name: Robert Mercer
- Date of birth: 21 September 1889
- Place of birth: Avonbridge, Scotland
- Date of death: 23 April 1926 (aged 36)
- Place of death: Selkirk, Scotland
- Height: 6 ft 0 in (1.83 m)
- Position: Centre back

Youth career
- Gala Hailes Villa

Senior career*
Years	Team	Apps	(Gls)
1907–1908	Selkirk		
1908–1909	Leith Athletic	18	(1)
1909–1921	Hearts	242	(23)
1921–1922	Dunfermline Athletic	70	(6)

International career
1912–1913	Scottish League XI	5	(1)
1912–1913	Scotland	2	(0)
- * Club domestic league appearances and goals

Robert Mercer (21 September 1889 – 23 April 1926) was a Scottish footballer who played for Leith Athletic, Heart of Midlothian, Dunfermline Athletic and Scotland. Mercer served in the British armed forces during the First World War, but he was a victim of a gas attack and did not fully recover.
