= 1923–24 FA Cup =

Tournament details
- Country: England; Wales

Final positions
- Champions: Newcastle United (2nd title)
- Runners-up: Aston Villa

The 1923–24 FA Cup was the 49th season of the world's oldest football cup competition, the Football Association Challenge Cup, commonly known as the FA Cup. Newcastle United won the competition for the second time, beating Aston Villa 2–0 in the final at Wembley.

Matches were scheduled to be played at the stadium of the team named first on the date specified for each round, which was always a Saturday. Some matches, however, might be rescheduled for other days if there were clashes with games for other competitions or the weather was inclement. If scores were level after 90 minutes had been played, a replay would take place at the stadium of the second-named team later the same week. If the replayed match was drawn further replays would be held until a winner was determined. If scores were level after 90 minutes had been played in a replay, a 30-minute period of extra time would be played.

== Calendar ==
The format of the FA Cup for the season had two preliminary rounds, six qualifying rounds, four proper rounds, and the semi-finals and final.

Round	Date
Extra preliminary round	Saturday 8 September 1923
Preliminary round	Saturday 22 September 1923
First round qualifying	Saturday 6 October 1923
Second round qualifying	Saturday 20 October 1923
Third round qualifying	Saturday 3 November 1923
Fourth round qualifying	Saturday 17 November 1923
Fifth round qualifying	Saturday 1 December 1923
Sixth round qualifying	Saturday 15 December 1923
First round proper	Saturday 12 January 1924
Second round proper	Saturday 2 February 1924
Third round proper	Saturday 23 February 1924
Fourth round proper	Saturday 8 March 1924
Semi-finals	Saturday 29 March 1924
Final	Saturday 26 April 1924

== Qualifying rounds ==
37 Football League clubs joined the participating non-league teams entering this season's tournament in the qualifying rounds. Four Second Division sides, Port Vale, Stockport County, Nelson and Coventry City were entered in the fifth qualifying round, with Port Vale losing to Wrexham, Nelson losing to Wigan Borough and Coventry losing to Tranmere Rovers. Stockport progressed to the next round but lost there to Norwich City.

18 Third Division clubs (Darlington, Crewe Alexandra, Accrington Stanley, Walsall, Rotherham County, Grimsby Town, Halifax Town, Chesterfield, Wrexham and Wigan Borough from the North, and Northampton Town, Brentford, Gillingham, Portsmouth, Bristol Rovers, Reading, Merthyr Town and Norwich City from the South) were also entered in the fifth qualifying round, with 14 of these winning through to the next round and only four going out at this stage.

Another twelve Third Division clubs (Ashington, Hartlepools United, Barrow, Southport, New Brighton, Rochdale, Lincoln City and Tranmere Rovers from the North, and Southend United, Exeter City, Newport County and Aberdare Athletic from the South) were entered in the fourth qualifying round. Barrow went out to non-league Carlisle United while the others either progressed or lost amongst themselves.

The remaining Third Division clubs, Durham City, Doncaster Rovers and Bournemouth & Boscombe Athletic were entered in the preliminary round. Durham needed two replays to see off West Stanley before losing to Northern Combination outfit Dipton United, while Doncaster and Bournemouth (both newly elected to the Football League this season) withdrew from the competition after being drawn against Fryston Colliery Welfare and Portsea Gas Company respectively.

The eleven League teams ultimately winning through to the first round proper were Grimsby Town, Portsmouth, Accrington Stanley, Northampton Town, Ashington, Exeter City, Norwich City, Aberdare Athletic, Gillingham, Darlington and Halifax Town. The final spot in the main draw went to Welsh Southern League club Llanelli, who were appearing at that stage for the first time.

Of the 171 clubs entered in the extra preliminary round, the most successful were Hinckley United and Folkestone who progressed to the fifth qualifying round before losing to Grimsby Town and Norwich City respectively. Kent League side Sittingbourne, having entered the competition in the fourth qualifying round, was the only non-league club besides Llanelli to participate in the sixth qualifying round.

== First round proper ==
40 of the 44 clubs from the Football League First Division and Football League Second Division joined the 12 lower-league clubs who came through the qualifying rounds. To bring the number of teams up to 64, amateur side Corinthian received a bye to the first round as did nine Third Division South sides and two Third Division North sides. These were:

- Watford
- Brighton & Hove Albion
- Luton Town
- Swindon Town
- Queens Park Rangers
- Charlton Athletic
- Millwall
- Swansea Town
- Plymouth Argyle
- Wolverhampton Wanderers
- Bradford Park Avenue

32 matches were scheduled to be played on Saturday, 12 January 1924. Seven matches were drawn and went to replays in the following midweek fixture, of which two went to another replay.

Tie no	Home team	Score	Away team	Date
1	Ashington	1–5	Aston Villa	12 January 1924
2	Blackpool	1–0	Sheffield United	12 January 1924
3	Burnley	3–2	South Shields	12 January 1924
4	Liverpool	2–1	Bradford City	12 January 1924
5	The Wednesday	4–1	Leicester City	12 January 1924
6	Wolverhampton Wanderers	3–1	Darlington	12 January 1924
7	Middlesbrough	0–1	Watford	12 January 1924
8	Derby County	2–1	Bury	12 January 1924
9	Everton	3–1	Preston North End	12 January 1924
10	Swindon Town	4–0	Bradford Park Avenue	12 January 1924
11	Manchester City	2–0	Nottingham Forest	12 January 1924
12	Queens Park Rangers	1–2	Notts County	12 January 1924
13	Fulham	2–0	Llanelli	12 January 1924
14	Accrington Stanley	0–0	Charlton Athletic	12 January 1924
Replay	Charlton Athletic	1–0	Accrington Stanley	17 January 1924
15	Barnsley	0–0	Brighton & Hove Albion	12 January 1924
Replay	Brighton & Hove Albion	1–0	Barnsley	16 January 1924
16	Northampton Town	1–1	Halifax Town	12 January 1924
Replay	Halifax Town	1–1	Northampton Town	16 January 1924
Replay	Halifax Town	4–2	Northampton Town	21 January 1924
17	Portsmouth	2–4	Newcastle United	12 January 1924
18	West Ham United	5–0	Aberdare Athletic	12 January 1924
19	Manchester United	1–0	Plymouth Argyle	12 January 1924
20	Norwich City	0–1	Bristol City	12 January 1924
21	Millwall	0–1	West Bromwich Albion	12 January 1924
22	Hull City	2–2	Bolton Wanderers	12 January 1924
Replay	Bolton Wanderers	4–0	Hull City	16 January 1924
23	Oldham Athletic	2–1	Sunderland	12 January 1924
24	Crystal Palace	2–0	Tottenham Hotspur	12 January 1924
25	Chelsea	1–1	Southampton	12 January 1924
Replay	Southampton	2–0	Chelsea	16 January 1924
26	Exeter City	1–0	Grimsby Town	12 January 1924
27	Huddersfield Town	1–0	Birmingham	12 January 1924
28	Cardiff City	0–0	Gillingham	12 January 1924
Replay	Gillingham	0–2	Cardiff City	16 January 1924
29	Swansea Town	1–1	Clapton Orient	12 January 1924
Replay	Clapton Orient	1–1	Swansea Town	16 January 1924
Replay	Swansea Town	2–1	Clapton Orient	21 January 1924
30	Arsenal	4–1	Luton Town	12 January 1924
31	Leeds United	1–0	Stoke	12 January 1924
32	Corinthian	1–0	Blackburn Rovers	12 January 1924

== Second round proper ==
The 16 Second Round matches were played on Saturday, 2 February 1924. Eight matches were drawn, with replays taking place in the following midweek fixture. Three of these then went to a second replay played the following week, and two of these went to a third replay.

Tie no	Home team	Score	Away team	Date
1	Burnley	0–0	Fulham	2 February 1924
Replay	Fulham	0–1	Burnley	6 February 1924
2	Southampton	3–1	Blackpool	2 February 1924
3	The Wednesday	1–1	Bristol City	2 February 1924
Replay	Bristol City	2–0	The Wednesday	6 February 1924
4	Bolton Wanderers	1–4	Liverpool	2 February 1924
5	West Bromwich Albion	5–0	Corinthian	2 February 1924
6	Derby County	2–2	Newcastle United	2 February 1924
Replay	Newcastle United	2–2	Derby County	6 February 1924
Replay	Derby County	2–2	Newcastle United	11 February 1924
Replay	Newcastle United	5–3	Derby County	12 February 1924
7	Swindon Town	2–0	Oldham Athletic	2 February 1924
8	Manchester City	2–2	Halifax Town	2 February 1924
Replay	Halifax Town	0–0	Manchester City	6 February 1924
Replay	Manchester City	3–0	Halifax Town	11 February 1924
9	West Ham United	1–1	Leeds United	2 February 1924
Replay	Leeds United	1–0	West Ham United	6 February 1924
10	Brighton & Hove Albion	5–2	Everton	2 February 1924
11	Manchester United	0–3	Huddersfield Town	2 February 1924
12	Crystal Palace	0–0	Notts County	2 February 1924
Replay	Notts County	0–0	Crystal Palace	6 February 1924
Replay	Crystal Palace	0–0	Notts County	11 February 1924
Replay	Crystal Palace	2–1	Notts County	18 February 1924
13	Exeter City	0–0	Watford	2 February 1924
Replay	Watford	1–0	Exeter City	6 February 1924
14	Cardiff City	1–0	Arsenal	2 February 1924
15	Swansea Town	0–2	Aston Villa	2 February 1924
16	Charlton Athletic	0–0	Wolverhampton Wanderers	2 February 1924
Replay	Wolverhampton Wanderers	1–0	Charlton Athletic	6 February 1924

== Third round proper ==
The eight Third Round matches were scheduled for Saturday, 23 February 1924. Two matches were drawn and went to replays in the following midweek fixture.

Tie no	Home team	Score	Away team	Date
1	Burnley	1–0	Huddersfield Town	23 February 1924
2	Southampton	0–0	Liverpool	23 February 1924
Replay	Liverpool	2–0	Southampton	27 February 1924
3	Watford	0–1	Newcastle United	23 February 1924
4	Aston Villa	3–0	Leeds United	23 February 1924
5	West Bromwich Albion	1–1	Wolverhampton Wanderers	23 February 1924
Replay	Wolverhampton Wanderers	0–2	West Bromwich Albion	27 February 1924
6	Brighton & Hove Albion	1–5	Manchester City	23 February 1924
7	Crystal Palace	1–2	Swindon Town	23 February 1924
8	Cardiff City	3–0	Bristol City	23 February 1924

== Fourth round proper ==
The four Fourth round matches were scheduled for Saturday, 8 March 1924. There were two replays, played in the following midweek fixture.

Tie no	Home team	Score	Away team	Date
1	West Bromwich Albion	0–2	Aston Villa	8 March 1924
2	Swindon Town	1–1	Burnley	8 March 1924
Replay	Burnley	3–1	Swindon Town	12 March 1924
3	Newcastle United	1–0	Liverpool	8 March 1924
4	Manchester City	0–0	Cardiff City	8 March 1924
Replay	Cardiff City	0–1	Manchester City	12 March 1924

== Semi-finals ==
The semi-final matches were played on Saturday, 29 March 1924. The matches ended in victories for Newcastle United and Aston Villa, who went on to meet in the final at Wembley.

29 March 1924
15:00

Aston Villa	3–0	Burnley

Bramall Lane, Sheffield

29 March 1924
15:00

Newcastle United	2–0	Manchester City

St Andrew's, Birmingham

== Final ==
The 1924 FA Cup Final was contested by Newcastle United and Aston Villa at Wembley. Newcastle won 2–0, the goals scored by Neil Harris and Stan Seymour.

== Match details ==
26 April 1924
15:00 BST

Newcastle United	2–0	Aston Villa
Harris 83'; Seymour 85'	Report

Wembley, London
Attendance: 91,695
Referee: W. E. Russell

Newcastle United	Aston Villa

== See also ==
- FA Cup Final Results 1872-
