= 1932–33 Aston Villa F.C. season =

English football club season

Aston Villa
1932–33 season
- President: Patrick Hannon
- Manager: Billy Smith
- Stadium: Villa Park
- First Division: 2nd
- FA Cup: Fourth round

Second City Derby
- 20--11--12

The 1932–33 English football season was Aston Villa's 41st season in The Football League, Villa playing in the First Division. Billy Smith remained trophy-less going into his seventh season.

Going into the New Year fixtures, the Influenza season was creating havoc with so many ill that clubs were struggling to field full teams. The Times noted that the main threat to Arsenal came "as usual" from Aston Villa. In the Second City derby both teams won their home fixtures.

There were debuts for Archie Watkins, Joe Nibloe, Ernie Callaghan, Ollie Tidman, Ken Tewkesbury, Arthur Cunliffe and Ronnie Dix.

== League table ==
| Pos | Team | Pld | W | D | L | GF | GA | GAv | Pts |
|---|---|---|---|---|---|---|---|---|---|
| 1 | Arsenal (C) | 42 | 25 | 8 | 9 | 118 | 61 | 1.934 | 58 |
| 2 | Aston Villa | 42 | 23 | 8 | 11 | 92 | 67 | 1.373 | 54 |
| 3 | Sheffield Wednesday | 42 | 21 | 9 | 12 | 80 | 68 | 1.176 | 51 |
| 4 | West Bromwich Albion | 42 | 20 | 9 | 13 | 83 | 70 | 1.186 | 49 |
| 5 | Newcastle United | 42 | 22 | 5 | 15 | 71 | 63 | 1.127 | 49 |

Source: World Football
Rules for classification: 1) Points; 2) Goal average; 3) Goals scored
(C) Champions

=== Matches ===
| 27 August 1932 | Middlesbrough | 0–2 | Aston Villa | Ayresome Park |
| | | Report | George Brown 53'; Billy Walker 64' |

| 29 August 1932 | Aston Villa | 1–0 | Sunderland | Villa Park |
| | George Brown 19' |

| 3 September 1932 | Aston Villa | 6–1 | Bolton | Villa Park |
| | George Brown 2', 21', 30', 63'; Joe Beresford 44', 87' |

| 7 September 1932 | Sunderland | 1–1 | Aston Villa | Roker Park |
| | | | George Brown 43' |

| 10 September 1932 | Liverpool | 0–0 | Aston Villa | Anfield |

| 17 September 1932 | Aston Villa | 4–2 | Leicester | Villa Park |
| | George Brown 14', 78'; Billy Walker 48'; Eric Houghton 58' |

| 24 September 1932 | Portsmouth | 2–4 | Aston Villa | Fratton Park |
| | | | George Brown 44', 63'; Dai Astley 60', 89' |

| 1 October 1932 | Aston Villa | 3–1 | Chelsea | Villa Park |
| | Jimmy Gibson 2'; Dai Astley 82'; 2–0 |

| 8 October 1932 | Huddersfield | 0–0 | Aston Villa | Leeds Road |

| 15 October 1932 | Aston Villa | 3–0 | Sheffield United | Villa Park |
| | Billy Walker 21'; Eric Houghton 44'; George Brown 57' |

| 22 October 1932 | Aston Villa | 1–0 | Birmingham | Villa Park |
| | Eric Houghton 59' |

| 29 October 1932 | West Bromwich Albion | 3–1 | Aston Villa | The Hawthorns |
| | | | Eric Houghton 65' |

| 5 November 1932 | Aston Villa | 6–2 | Blackpool | Villa Park |
| | Eric Houghton 6', 16'; Jack Mandley 24'; Billy Walker 30', 78'; George Brown 87' |

| 12 November 1932 | Everton | 3–3 | Aston Villa | Goodison Park |
| | | | Dai Astley 1–1; George Brown 46'; Jack Mandley 65' |

| 19 November 1932 | Aston Villa | 5–3 | Arsenal | Villa Park |
| | Jimmy Gibson 22'; Eric Houghton 29', 58'; Jack Mandley 72'; George Brown 76' |

| 26 November 1932 | Manchester City | 5–2 | Aston Villa | Maine Road |
| | | | Dai Astley 30'; Eric Houghton 2–5 |

| 3 December 1932 | Aston Villa | 3–6 | Sheffield Wednesday | Villa Park |
| | George Brown 14'; Dai Astley 2 |

| 10 December 1932 | Leeds | 1–1 | Aston Villa | Elland Road |
| | | | Eric Houghton 51' (pen) |

| 17 December 1932 | Aston Villa | 4–0 | Blackburn | Villa Park |
| | Dai Astley 18', 30?; George Brown 23', 4–0 |

| 24 December 1932 | Derby County | 0–0 | Aston Villa | Baseball Ground |

| 26 December 1932 | Aston Villa | 1–3 | Wolves | Villa Park |
| | Dai Astley 11' |

| 27 December 1932 | Wolves | 2–4 | Aston Villa | Molineux |
| | | | George Brown 51', 52'; Jack Mandley 81'; Joe Beresford 88' |

| 31 December 1932 | Aston Villa | 3–1 | Middlesbrough | Villa Park |
| | Eric Houghton 43' (pen); Jack Mandley 81'; Joe Beresford 84' |

| 7 January 1933 | Bolton | 0–1 | Aston Villa | Burnden Park |
| | | | Jack Mandley 21' |

| 21 January 1933 | Aston Villa | 5–2 | Liverpool | Villa Park |
| | Pongo Waring 1', 3–1; Eric Houghton 8'; Jimmy Gibson 4–2; Joe Beresford 5–2 |

| 4 February 1933 | Aston Villa | 4–1 | Portsmouth | Villa Park |
| | George Brown 4'; Archie Watkins 26'; Pongo Waring 60', 61' |

| 9 February 1933 | Leicester | 3–0 | Aston Villa | Filbert Street |

| 11 February 1933 | Chelsea | 0–1 | Aston Villa | Stamford Bridge |
| | | | Jack Mandley 75' |

| 18 February 1933 | Aston Villa | 0–3 | Huddersfield | Villa Park |

| 8 March 1933 | Birmingham | 3–2 | Aston Villa | St Andrew's |
| | | | George Brown 54'; Jack Mandley 84' |

| 11 March 1933 | Aston Villa | 3–2 | West Bromwich Albion | Villa Park |
| | Dai Astley 13', 82'; George Brown 88' |

| 18 March 1933 | Blackpool | 6–2 | Aston Villa | Bloomfield Road |
| | | | Reg Chester 1–5; Billy Simpson 82' |

| 25 March 1933 | Aston Villa | 2–1 | Everton | Villa Park |
| | George Brown 29'; Joe Beresford 82' |

| 1 April 1933 | Arsenal | 5–0 | Aston Villa | Arsenal Stadium |

| 8 April 1933 | Aston Villa | 1–1 | Manchester City | Villa Park |
| | George Brown 39' |

| 15 April 1933 | Sheffield Wednesday | 0–2 | Aston Villa | Hillsborough |
| | | | Tommy Wood 43'; George Brown 67' |

| 17 April 1933 | Newcastle | 3–1 | Aston Villa | St James' Park |
| | | | George Brown 45' |

| 18 April 1933 | Aston Villa | 3–0 | Newcastle | Villa Park |
| | Tommy Wood 30'; George Brown 67', 85' |

| 22 April 1933 | Aston Villa | 0–0 | Leeds | Villa Park |

| 24 April 1933 | Sheffield United | 1–0 | Aston Villa | Bramall Lane |

| 29 April 1933 | Blackburn | 0–5 | Aston Villa | Ewood Park |
| | | | George Brown 67', 68', 71', 74'; Eric Houghton 87' |

| 6 May 1933 | Aston Villa | 2–0 | Derby County | Villa Park |
| | Arthur Cunliffe 46'; Dai Astley 55' |

Source: avfchistory.co.uk

== Squad statistics ==
- Eric Houghton, 45 appearances
- Harry Morton, 44 appearances, conceded 73
- George Brown, 41 appearances
- Jimmy Gibson, 41 appearances
- Danny Blair, 40 appearances
- Tommy Mort, 36 appearances
- Billy Walker, 33 appearances
- Joe Tate, 30 appearances
- Jack Mandley, 28 appearances
- Dai Astley, 28 appearances
- Alec Talbot, 21 appearances
- Joe Beresford, 20 appearances
- Billy Kingdon, 18 appearances
- Billy Simpson, 13 appearances
- Tommy Wood, 13 appearances
- Joe Nibloe, 12 appearances
- Archie Watkins, 8 appearances
- Reg Chester, 6 appearances
- Pongo Waring, 6 appearances
- Ernie Callaghan 5 appearances
- Tommy Smart, 2 appearances
- Teddy Bowen, 1 appearance
- Ollie Tidman 1 appearance
- Ken Tewkesbury 1 appearance, Conceded 0
- Arthur Cunliffe 1 appearance
- Ronnie Dix 1 appearance
