= 1931–32 Aston Villa F.C. season =

English football club season

Aston Villa
1931–32 season
- President: Patrick Hannon
- Manager: Billy Smith
- Stadium: Villa Park
- First Division: 5th
- FA Cup: Fourth round

First Division
- Season: 1931–32
- Champions: Everton; 4th English title
- Relegated: Grimsby Town; West Ham United
- Matches: 462
- Goals: 1,727 (3.74 per match)
- Top goalscorer: Dixie Dean (44 goals)
- Biggest home win: Everton 8–1 Newcastle United (31 October 1931); Everton 9–2 Leicester City (28 November 1931); Bolton Wanderers 8–1 Liverpool (7 March 1932)
- Biggest away win: Blackburn 1–6 Sheffield Wed (29 April 1932)
- Highest scoring: Everton 9–3 Sheffield Wednesday (17 October 1931)

Second City Derby
- 19—10—12

The 1931–32 English football season was Aston Villa's 40th season in The Football League, Villa playing in the First Division. Billy Smith remained trophy-less going into his sixth season.

Aston Villa had ended the previous season with nine consecutive home wins. On 29 August, the first day of the season, Villa beat Leicester 3–2 at home. This was followed by home wins against Grimsby, West Ham and Bolton. In the Second City Derby Villa won 3–2 at home and drew 1–1 away. With a full programme of New Year fixtures across all four divisions, The Times highlighted in particular Aston Villa's clash with high-flying Newcastle United. Villa had recently beaten Newcastle 3–0.

There were debuts for Dai Astley, Danny Blair, Harry Morton, George H Stephenson, Billy Simpson and Tommy Moore.

== First Division ==
Pos	Team	Pld	W	D	L	GF	GA	GAv	Pts
3	Sheffield Wednesday	42	22	6	14	96	82	1.171	50
4	Huddersfield Town	42	19	10	13	80	63	1.270	48
5	Aston Villa	42	19	8	15	104	72	1.444	46
6	West Bromwich Albion	42	20	6	16	77	55	1.400	46
7	Sheffield United	42	20	6	16	80	75	1.067	46

Source: World Football
Rules for classification: 1) Points; 2) Goal average; 3) Goals scored

=== Matches ===
29 August 1931	Aston Villa	3–2	Leicester City	Villa Park
	Eric Houghton 54'; Pongo Waring 71', 83'	Report

31 August 1931	Huddersfield Town	1–1	Aston Villa	Leeds Road
			Pongo Waring 88'
Note: Aston Villa draw 1 – 1 away at Huddersfield in front of a crowd of 13,226.

5 September 1931	Liverpool	2–0	Aston Villa	Anfield

12 September 1931	Aston Villa	7–0	Grimsby Town	Villa Park
	Joe Beresford 4'; Eric Houghton 10', 64'; Jack Mandley 24', 51'; Pongo Waring 70'; Billy Walker 82'

19 September 1931	Chelsea	3–6	Aston Villa	Stamford Bridge
			Pongo Waring 20', 31', 75', 82'; Eric Houghton 32', 60'

26 September 1931	Aston Villa	5–2	West Ham United	Villa Park
	Pongo Waring 18', 21', 47', 78'; Eric Houghton 74'

3 October 1931	Sheffield Wednesday	1–0	Aston Villa	Hillsborough Stadium
	None

10 October 1931	Aston Villa	2–1	Bolton Wanderers	Villa Park
	Eric Houghton 31'; Billy Walker 69'

17 October 1931	Portsmouth	0–3	Aston Villa	Fratton Park
			Billy Walker 66'; Joe Beresford 84'; Dai Astley 89'

24 October 1931	Aston Villa	2–3	Everton	Villa Park
	Eric Houghton 25'; Jack Mandley 46'

31 October 1931	Arsenal	1–1	Aston Villa	Highbury
			Pongo Waring 58'

7 November 1931	Aston Villa	5–1	Blackpool	Villa Park
	Pongo Waring 8', 44', 85'; Eric Houghton 47'; Joe Beresford 87'

14 November 1931	West Bromwich Albion	3–0	Aston Villa	The Hawthorns
	None

21 November 1931	Aston Villa	3–2	Birmingham City	Villa Park
	Billy Walker 5'; Pongo Waring 37', 65'

28 November 1931	Manchester City	3–3	Aston Villa	Maine Road
			Tommy Smart 75' (pen); Pongo Waring 77', 84'

5 December 1931	Aston Villa	2–0	Derby County	Villa Park
	Eric Houghton 30', 80'

12 December 1931	Sheffield United	5–4	Aston Villa	Bramall Lane
			Jimmy Gibson 12'; Pongo Waring 2–5; Billy Walker 3–5; Eric Houghton 4–5

19 December 1931	Aston Villa	1–5	Blackburn Rovers	Villa Park
	Billy Walker 63'

25 December 1931	Aston Villa	7–1	Middlesbrough	Villa Park
	Eric Houghton 2', 12', 34'; Joe Beresford 29', 5–1, 6–1; Tommy Mort 7–1

26 December 1931	Middlesbrough	1–1	Aston Villa	Ayresome Park
			Reg Chester 32'

28 December 1931	Aston Villa	3–0	Newcastle United	Villa Park
	Reg Chester 10'; Eric Houghton 83'; Pongo Waring 87'

1 January 1932	Newcastle United	3–1	Aston Villa	St James' Park
			Joe Beresford 30'

2 January 1932	Leicester City	3–8	Aston Villa	Filbert Street
			George Brown 6', 23', 54', 82', 89'; Joe Beresford 24'; Billy Walker 33', 43'

16 January 1932	Aston Villa	6–1	Liverpool	Villa Park
	Eric Houghton 21'; George Brown 26', 55', 62'; George Stephenson 53'; 6–1

30 January 1932	Aston Villa	1–3	Chelsea	Villa Park
	Eric Houghton 84'

2 February 1932	Grimsby Town	2–2	Aston Villa	Blundell Park
			Jack Mandley 1–2; Pongo Waring 2–2

6 February 1932	West Ham United	2–1	Aston Villa	Boleyn Ground
			Joe Beresford 86'

20 February 1932	Bolton Wanderers	2–1	Aston Villa	Burnden Park
			Pongo Waring 1–2

24 February 1932	Aston Villa	3–1	Sheffield Wednesday	Villa Park
	Billy Walker 24'; Eric Houghton 45'; Pongo Waring 3–1

27 February 1932	Aston Villa	0–1	Portsmouth	Villa Park
	None

5 March 1932	Everton	4–2	Aston Villa	Goodison Park
			Dai Astley 58'; Pongo Waring 84'

19 March 1932	Blackpool	1–3	Aston Villa	Bloomfield Road
			Pongo Waring 15', 2–1; Eric Houghton 75' (pen)

25 March 1932	Sunderland	1–1	Aston Villa	Roker Park
			Dai Astley 75'

26 March 1932	Aston Villa	2–0	West Bromwich Albion	Villa Park
	Dai Astley 1–0; Eric Houghton 79'

28 March 1932	Aston Villa	2–0	Sunderland	Villa Park
	George Brown 1–0; Eric Houghton 2–0

2 April 1932	Birmingham City	1–1	Aston Villa	St Andrew's
			Eric Houghton 11'

9 April 1932	Aston Villa	2–1	Manchester City	Villa Park
	Reg Chester 40' (pen); George Brown 83'

16 April 1932	Derby County	3–1	Aston Villa	Baseball Ground
			Reg Chester 43'

23 April 1932	Aston Villa	5–0	Sheffield United	Villa Park
	Alec Talbot 4'; Pongo Waring 20'; Dai Astley 38', 73'; Jack Mandley 76'

25 April 1932	Aston Villa	1–1	Arsenal	Villa Park
	Jack Mandley 8'

30 April 1932	Blackburn Rovers	2–0	Aston Villa	Ewood Park
	None

7 May 1932	Aston Villa	2–3	Huddersfield Town	Villa Park
	Pongo Waring 24'; Tommy Moore 84'

Source: avfchistory.co.uk

== Players ==
- Alec Talbot, 45 appearances
- Tommy Smart, 39 appearances
- Eric Houghton, 39 appearances
- Pongo Waring, 38 appearances
- Tommy Mort, 37 appearances
- Jimmy Gibson, 37 appearances
- Joe Tate, 35 appearances
- Joe Beresford, 34 appearances
- Jack Mandley, 33 appearances
- Harry Morton, 31 appearances, conceded 50
- Billy Walker, 31 appearances
- George Brown, 17 appearances
- Dai Astley, 15 appearances
- Fred Biddlestone, 14 appearances, conceded 22
- Reg Chester, 13 appearances
- Tommy Wood, 13 appearances
- Danny Blair, 10 appearances
- Teddy Bowen, 5 appearances
- George Stephenson, 4 appearances
- Billy Simpson, 2 appearances
- Billy Kingdon, 2 appearances
- Tommy Moore, 1 appearance
