= 1933–34 Aston Villa F.C. season =

English football club season

Aston Villa
1933–34 season
- President: Patrick Hannon
- Manager: Billy Smith
- Stadium: Villa Park
- First Division: 13th
- FA Cup: Semi-Finals

Second City Derby
- 20--11--14

The 1933–34 English football season was Aston Villa's 42nd season in The Football League, Villa playing in the First Division. Billy Smith remained trophy-less going into his eighth season. Jimmy McMullan was appointed as manager when Billy Smith retired in May 1934.

On 30 December 1933, Villa drew 1–1 away Leicester City, Dai Astley equalizing in the final seconds of the game.

Both Second City derby matches were drawn. 0–0 away, 1–1 at home.

Tommy Gardner was the sole debutant this season.

== League table ==
Pos	Team	Pld	W	D	L	GF	GA	GAv	Pts
11	Sheffield Wednesday	42	16	9	17	62	67	0.925	41
12	Stoke City	42	15	11	16	58	71	0.817	41
13	Aston Villa	42	14	12	16	78	75	1.040	40
14	Everton	42	12	16	14	62	63	0.984	40
15	Wolverhampton Wanderers	42	14	12	16	74	86	0.860	40

Source: World Football
Rules for classification: 1) Points; 2) Goal average; 3) Goals scored

=== Matches ===
26 August 1933	Aston Villa	2–3	Leicester	Villa Park
	Dai Astley 65'; Pongo Waring 85'	Report
Note:

28 August 1933	Sheffield Wednesday	1–2	Aston Villa	Hillsborough
			Eric Houghton 35'; Dai Astley 86'

2 September 1933	Tottenham Hotspur	3–2	Aston Villa	White Hart Lane
			Pongo Waring 56'; Dai Astley 57'

4 September 1933	Aston Villa	1–0	Sheffield Wednesday	Villa Park
	Pongo Waring 3'

9 September 1933	Aston Villa	4–2	Liverpool	Villa Park
	Dai Astley 4'; Eric Houghton 44' (pen); Alec Talbot 3–1; 4–2

16 September 1933	Chelsea	1–0	Aston Villa	Stamford Bridge

23 September 1933	Aston Villa	2–1	Sunderland	Villa Park
	Eric Houghton 37'; Dai Astley 65'

30 September 1933	Portsmouth	3–2	Aston Villa	Fratton Park
			Dai Astley 33'; Arthur Cunliffe 55'

7 October 1933	Aston Villa	4–3	Huddersfield	Villa Park
	Eric Houghton 10', 52'; Dai Astley 29'; Pongo Waring 61'

14 October 1933	Stoke City	1–1	Aston Villa	Victoria Ground
			Arthur Cunliffe 45'

21 October 1933	Manchester City	1–0	Aston Villa	Maine Road

28 October 1933	Aston Villa	2–3	Arsenal	Villa Park
	Pongo Waring 65', 77'

4 November 1933	Leeds United	2–4	Aston Villa	Elland Road
			Pongo Waring 10', 78'; Eric Houghton 46'; Dai Astley 80'

11 November 1933	Aston Villa	3–0	Middlesbrough	Villa Park
	Eric Houghton 1–0; Joe Beresford 58'; Arthur Cunliffe 3–0

18 November 1933	Blackburn	2–1	Aston Villa	Ewood Park
			Arthur Cunliffe 19'

25 November 1933	Aston Villa	2–3	Newcastle	Villa Park
	Pongo Waring 15'; Dai Astley 2–2

2 December 1933	Birmingham	0–0	Aston Villa	St Andrew's

9 December 1933	Aston Villa	0–2	Derby County	Villa Park

16 December 1933	West Bromwich Albion	2–1	Aston Villa	The Hawthorns
			Dai Astley 36'

23 December 1933	Aston Villa	2–1	Everton	Villa Park
	Dai Astley 65'; Eric Houghton 80'

25 December 1933	Aston Villa	6–2	Wolves	Villa Park
	Jack Mandley 7'; Dai Astley 15'; Pongo Waring 17'; Ronnie Dix 45'; 5–1; 6–2

26 December 1933	Wolves	4–3	Aston Villa	Molineux
			Reg Chester 27'; Ronnie Dix 2–3

30 December 1933	Leicester	1–1	Aston Villa	Filbert Street
			Dai Astley 89'

1 January 1934	Sheffield United	3–3	Aston Villa	Bramall Lane
			Eric Houghton 7'; 2–2; Pongo Waring 87'

6 January 1934	Tottenham Hotspur	5–1	Aston Villa	White Hart Lane
			Dai Astley 86'

20 January 1934	Liverpool	2–3	Aston Villa	Anfield
			Ronnie Dix 16'; Pongo Waring 23', 89'

3 February 1934	Sunderland	5–1	Aston Villa	Roker Park
			Dai Astley 20'

7 February 1934	Aston Villa	2–0	Chelsea	Villa Park
	Dai Astley 40'; Eric Houghton 60'

10 February 1934	Aston Villa	1–1	Portsmouth	Villa Park
	Dai Astley 70'

21 February 1934	Huddersfield	2–1	Aston Villa	Leeds Road
			Arthur Cunliffe 30'

24 February 1934	Aston Villa	1–2	Stoke City	Villa Park
	Joe Beresford 2'

7 March 1934	Aston Villa	0–0	Manchester City	Villa Park

10 March 1934	Arsenal	3–2	Aston Villa	Arsenal Stadium
			Ronnie Dix 10'; Eric Houghton 25'

24 March 1934	Middlesbrough	1–2	Aston Villa	Ayresome Park
			Eric Houghton 18'; Dai Astley 50'

31 March 1934	Aston Villa	1–1	Blackburn	Villa Park
	Alec Talbot 70'

2 April 1934	Aston Villa	3–0	Sheffield United	Villa Park
	Dai Astley 47'; Eric Houghton 55'; Joe Beresford 80'

7 April 1934	Newcastle	1–1	Aston Villa	St James' Park
			Eric Houghton 87'

14 April 1934	Aston Villa	1–1	Birmingham	Villa Park
	Ronnie Dix 3'

21 April 1934	Derby County	1–1	Aston Villa	Baseball Ground
			Dai Astley 2'

28 April 1934	Aston Villa	4–4	West Bromwich Albion	Villa Park
	Dai Astley 21'; Eric Houghton 48', 66' (pen); Joe Beresford 62'

30 April 1934	Aston Villa	3–0	Leeds United	Villa Park
	Dai Astley 36', 56', 75'

5 May 1934	Everton	2–2	Aston Villa	Goodison Park
			Dai Astley 42'; Eric Houghton 68'
Note:

Source: avfchistory.co.uk

== Squad statistics ==
=== Appearances ===
- Ronnie Dix 48 appearances
- Harry Morton, 48 appearances, conceded 86
- Eric Houghton, 47 appearances
- Dai Astley, 44 appearances
- Joe Nibloe, 40 appearances
- Arthur Cunliffe 39 appearances
- Danny Blair, 38 appearances
- Billy Kingdon, 37 appearances
- Alec Talbot, 33 appearances
- Jimmy Gibson, 28 appearances
- Pongo Waring, 28 appearances
- Joe Beresford, 27 appearances
- Tommy Wood, 20 appearances
- Tommy Mort, 16 appearances
- Tommy Gardner, 12 appearances
- Billy Simpson, 11 appearances
- George Brown, 6 appearances
- Jack Mandley, 6 appearances
- Billy Walker, 5 appearances
- Bob Brocklebank, 3 appearances
- Reg Chester, 2 appearances
- Teddy Bowen, 2 appearances
- Ernie Callaghan 2 appearances
- Joe Tate, 1 appearance

== See also ==
- List of Aston Villa F.C. records and statistics
