= 1929–30 Aston Villa F.C. season =

English football club season

Aston Villa
1929–30 season
- President: Patrick Hannon
- Manager: Billy Smith
- First Division: 4th
- FA Cup: Sixth round
Home colours

Second City Derby
- 17--10--10

The 1929–30 English football season was Aston Villa's 38th season in The Football League.

Dicky York hit seven goals in 32 games in 1929–30.

The Second City derby commenced on the first day of the season. Villa beat Birmingham 2–1 with goals from Reg Chester and Dicky York. They drew 1–1 in December at St Andrews.

In October Villa beat Leicester City 3-0 before a 45,000 crowd at Villa Park.

There were debuts for Eric Houghton (361), George Brown (116), Fred Biddlestone (151), Bob Brocklebank and Jack Mandley.

== Table ==
Pos	Team	Pld	W	D	L	GF	GA	GAv	Pts
2	Derby County	42	21	8	13	90	82	1.098	50
3	Manchester City	42	19	9	14	91	81	1.123	47
4	Aston Villa	42	21	5	16	92	83	1.108	47
5	Leeds United	42	20	6	16	79	63	1.254	46
6	Blackburn Rovers	42	19	7	16	99	93	1.065	45

Rules for classification: 1) Points; 2) Goal average; 3) Goals scored

=== Matches ===
31 August 1929	Aston Villa	2–1	Birmingham	Villa Park
	Reg Chester (11'); Dicky York (51')	Report

4 September 1929	Derby County	4–0	Aston Villa	Baseball Ground

7 September 1929	Leeds United	4–1	Aston Villa	Elland Road
			Joe Beresford (10')

9 September 1929	Aston Villa	2–2	Derby County	Villa Park
	George Brown; Dicky York (80')

14 September 1929	Aston Villa	1–3	Sheffield Wednesday	Villa Park
	Reg Chester (56' pen)

21 September 1929	Burnley	2–4	Aston Villa	Turf Moor
			George Brown (4', 6'); Reg Chester (11'); Billy Walker (64' pen)

25 September 1929	Aston Villa	5–2	Arsenal	Villa Park
	Jimmy Gibson (9'); George Brown (11', 22'); Joe Beresford

28 September 1929	Aston Villa	2–1	Sunderland	Villa Park
	Reg Chester (14'); Dicky York (59')

5 October 1929	Bolton Wanderers	3–0	Aston Villa	Burnden Park

12 October 1929	Aston Villa	5–2	Everton	Villa Park
	George Brown (3', 73', 89'); Reg Chester (21' pen); Billy Walker (82')

19 October 1929	Aston Villa	3–0	Leicester City	Villa Park
	George Brown (30', 37'); Joe Tate (60')

26 October 1929	Grimsby Town	0–2	Aston Villa	Blundell Park
			Reg Chester (42', 88')

2 November 1929	Aston Villa	1–0	Manchester United	Villa Park
	Reg Chester (78')

9 November 1929	Huddersfield Town	1–1	Aston Villa	Leeds Road
			Billy Walker (73')

16 November 1929	Aston Villa	2–3	Liverpool	Villa Park
	George Brown (21'); Joe Beresford (84')

23 November 1929	Middlesbrough	2–3	Aston Villa	Ayresome Park
			George Brown (20', 44'); Joe Beresford (63')

30 November 1929	Aston Villa	3–0	Blackburn Rovers	Villa Park
	Dicky York (27'); George Brown (44'); Joe Beresford (58')

7 December 1929	Newcastle United	2–2	Aston Villa	St James' Park
			Reg Chester (48'); George Brown (54')

14 December 1929	Aston Villa	5–1	Sheffield United	Villa Park
	Billy Walker (10', 17', 21', 76'); Joe Beresford (75')

21 December 1929	West Ham United	5–2	Aston Villa	Upton Park
			Tommy Smart (42'); George Brown (78')

25 December 1929	Aston Villa	0–2	Manchester City	Villa Park

26 December 1929	Manchester City	1–2	Aston Villa	Maine Road
			George Brown (62'); Own goal (63')

28 December 1929	Birmingham	1–1	Aston Villa	St Andrew's
			Billy Walker (73')

4 January 1930	Aston Villa	3–4	Leeds United	Villa Park
	George Brown (41', 85'); Alec Talbot (48')

18 January 1930	Sheffield Wednesday	3–0	Aston Villa	Hillsborough

1 February 1930	Sunderland	4–1	Aston Villa	Roker Park
			George Brown (85')

5 February 1930	Aston Villa	1–2	Burnley	Villa Park
	Joe Beresford (3')

8 February 1930	Aston Villa	2–0	Bolton Wanderers	Villa Park
	Joe Beresford (9'); George Brown (35')

22 February 1930	Leicester City	3–4	Aston Villa	Filbert Street
			Eric Houghton (10'); Dicky York (30', 82')

5 March 1930	Everton	3–4	Aston Villa	Goodison Park
			Eric Houghton; George Brown (18'); Pongo Waring (70'); Eric Houghton (72')

8 March 1930	Manchester United	2–3	Aston Villa	Old Trafford
			Pongo Waring (47', 71'); Joe Beresford (88')

15 March 1930	Aston Villa	5–3	Huddersfield Town	Villa Park
	Jack Mandley (22'); George Brown (25'); Pongo Waring (43', 84'); Eric Houghton (54')

22 March 1930	Liverpool	2–0	Aston Villa	Anfield

29 March 1930	Aston Villa	4–2	Middlesbrough	Villa Park
	Pongo Waring (30'); George Brown (75', 78')

2 April 1930	Aston Villa	4–1	Grimsby Town	Villa Park
	Eric Houghton (36', 38'); Pongo Waring; George Brown

5 April 1930	Blackburn Rovers	2–0	Aston Villa	Ewood Park

12 April 1930	Aston Villa	2–0	Newcastle United	Villa Park
	Eric Houghton (46'); George Brown (58')

18 April 1930	Portsmouth	1–2	Aston Villa	Fratton Park
			Eric Houghton (20'); Pongo Waring (46')

19 April 1930	Sheffield United	3–3	Aston Villa	Bramall Lane
			Joe Beresford (23'); Eric Houghton (52', 60')

21 April 1930	Aston Villa	0–1	Portsmouth	Villa Park

26 April 1930	Aston Villa	2–3	West Ham United	Villa Park
	George Brown (28' pen); Eric Houghton (42')

3 May 1930	Arsenal	2–4	Aston Villa	Highbury
			Eric Houghton (5'); George Brown (10'); Pongo Waring (39', 77')

Source: avfchistory.co.uk

== FA Cup ==
Third round

The 44 First and Second Division clubs entered the competition at this stage, along with Crystal Palace, Swindon Town and amateur side Corinthian.

The matches were scheduled for Saturday, 11 January 1930.

Tie no	Home team	Score	Away team	Date
8	Aston Villa	5–1	Reading	11 January 1930

Fourth round

The matches were scheduled for Saturday, 25 January 1930.

Tie no	Home team	Score	Away team	Date
3	Aston Villa	3–1	Walsall	25 January 1930

Fifth round

The matches were scheduled for Saturday, 15 February 1930.

Tie no	Home team	Score	Away team	Date
1	Aston Villa	4–1	Blackburn Rovers	15 February 1930

Sixth round

The four Sixth Round ties were scheduled to be played on Saturday, 1 March 1930.

Tie no	Home team	Score	Away team	Date
2	Aston Villa	1–2	Huddersfield Town	1 March 1930
