= 1927–28 Aston Villa F.C. season =

English football club season

Aston Villa
1927–28 season
- President: Patrick Hannon
- Manager: Billy Smith
- Stadium: Villa Park
- First Division: 8th
- FA Cup: Fourth round

Second City Derby
- 15--9--9

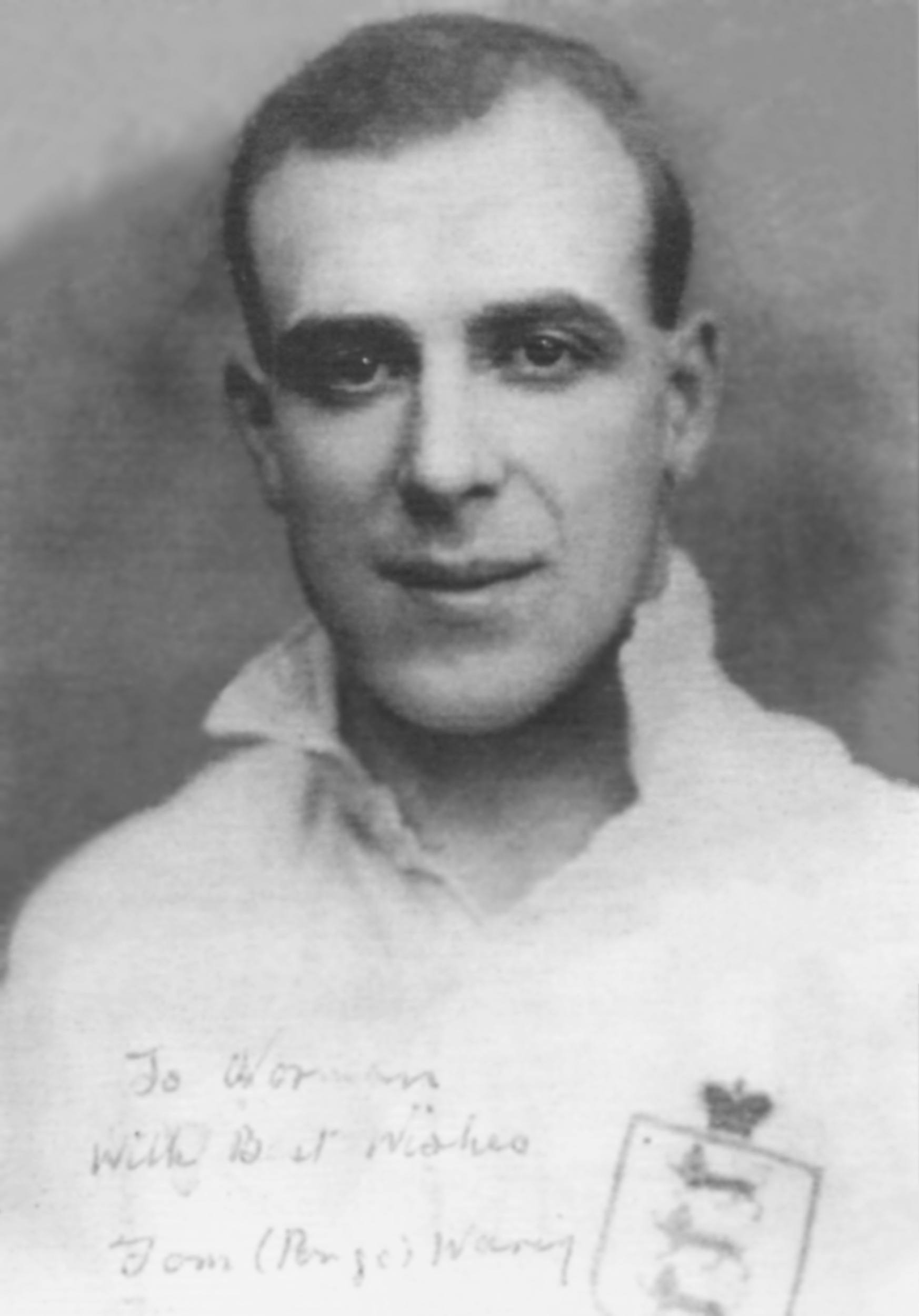
Pongo Waring

The 1927–28 English football season was Aston Villa's 36th season in The Football League. There were debuts for Joe Beresford (224), Pongo Waring (216), Joe Tate (180), Ben Olney (84), Jack Yates (15), John Brittleton (10), Fred Tully (7), Joe Hickman (2), and Harry Goddard (1).

Dicky York was limited to just four goals in 30 appearances in 1927–28.

Both matches in the Second City derby resulted in 1-1 draws, with Billy Walker scoring away and Tommy Smart scoring a penalty at Villa Park.

When Villa beat Huddersfield 3–0 on 2 May 1928, they ended the Yorkshire club's championship challenge. Arthur Dorrell, Pongo Waring and Billy Walker scored the goals.

== Table ==
Pos	Team	Pld	W	D	L	GF	GA	GAv	Pts
6	Cardiff City	42	17	10	15	70	80	0.875	44
7	Bolton Wanderers	42	16	11	15	81	66	1.227	43
8	Aston Villa	42	17	9	16	78	73	1.068	43
9	Newcastle United	42	15	13	14	79	81	0.975	43
10	Arsenal	42	13	15	14	82	86	0.953	41

Source: World Football
Rules for classification: 1) Points; 2) Goal average; 3) Goals scored

=== Matches ===
27 August 1927	Leicester	3–0	Aston Villa	Filbert Street
		Report

31 August 1927	Portsmouth	3–1	Aston Villa	Fratton Park
		Report	Billy Walker 42'

3 September 1927	Liverpool	0–0	Aston Villa	Anfield
		Report

5 September 1927	Aston Villa	7–2	Portsmouth	Villa Park
	Billy Cook 7', 80'; Arthur Dorrell 25'; Joe Beresford 52' (pen), 88'; Billy Walker 4–1	Report

10 September 1927	Aston Villa	2–2	Arsenal	Villa Park
	Joe Beresford 32'; Billy Cook 68'	Report

17 September 1927	Burnley	4–2	Aston Villa	Turf Moor
		Report	Billy Cook 28', 29'

24 September 1927	Aston Villa	1–0	Bury	Villa Park
	Dicky York 29'	Report

1 October 1927	Sheffield United	0–3	Aston Villa	Bramall Lane
		Report	Arthur Dorrell 33'; Billy Cook 54'; Joe Beresford 62'

8 October 1927	Aston Villa	5–1	Middlesbrough	Villa Park
	Billy Walker 24'; Arthur Dorrell 35'; Billy Cook 60', 72', 84'	Report

15 October 1927	Aston Villa	4–2	Sunderland	Villa Park
	Dicky York 28'; Billy Cook 38'; Billy Walker 40', 55'	Report

22 October 1927	Huddersfield	1–1	Aston Villa	Leeds Road
		Report	Billy Cook 85'

29 October 1927	Aston Villa	3–0	Newcastle	Villa Park
	Arthur Dorrell 17'; Billy Walker 84'; Own Goal 89'	Report

5 November 1927	Birmingham	1–1	Aston Villa	St Andrew's
		Report	Billy Walker 77'

12 November 1927	Aston Villa	1–2	Tottenham Hotspur	Villa Park
	Billy Cook 56'	Report

19 November 1927	Manchester United	5–1	Aston Villa	Old Trafford
		Report	Billy Cook 63'

26 November 1927	Aston Villa	2–0	Blackburn	Villa Park
	Billy Walker 56'; Joe Beresford 59'	Report

3 December 1927	Cardiff	2–1	Aston Villa	Ninian Park
		Report	Billy Cook 23'

10 December 1927	Aston Villa	2–3	Everton	Villa Park
	Billy Cook 37'; Reg Chester 56'	Report

17 December 1927	Bolton	3–1	Aston Villa	Burnden Park
		Report	Arthur Dorrell 14'

24 December 1927	Aston Villa	5–4	Sheffield Wednesday	Villa Park
	Joe Beresford 1', 25', 37'; Billy Cook 32', 64'	Report

26 December 1927	Derby	5–0	Aston Villa	Baseball Ground
		Report

27 December 1927	Aston Villa	0–1	Derby	Villa Park
		Report

31 December 1927	Leicester	3–0	Aston Villa	Filbert Street
		Report

7 January 1928	Aston Villa	3–4	Liverpool	Villa Park
	Reg Chester 3', 26'; Len Capewell 69'	Report

21 January 1928	Arsenal	0–3	Aston Villa	Highbury
		Report	Arthur Dorrell 60'; Tommy Smart 70'; Billy Cook 87'

4 February 1928	Bury	0–0	Aston Villa	Gigg Lane
		Report

8 February 1928	Aston Villa	3–1	Burnley	Villa Park
	Billy Cook 7'; Len Capewell 40', 65'	Report

11 February 1928	Aston Villa	1–0	Sheffield United	Villa Park
	Billy Cook 87'	Report

25 February 1928	Sunderland	2–3	Aston Villa	Roker Park
		Report	Billy Cook 15'; Pongo Waring 17'; Dicky York 40'

10 March 1928	Newcastle	7–5	Aston Villa	St James' Park
		Report	Billy Cook 23'; Pongo Waring 39', 78'; Arthur Dorrell 83'; Dicky York 85'

17 March 1928	Aston Villa	1–1	Birmingham	Villa Park
	Tommy Smart 86' (pen)	Report

21 March 1928	Middlesbrough	0–0	Aston Villa	Ayresome Park
		Report

24 March 1928	Tottenham Hotspur	2–1	Aston Villa	White Hart Lane
		Report	Len Capewell 42'

31 March 1928	Aston Villa	3–1	Manchester United	Villa Park
	Tommy Smart 6' (pen); Pongo Waring 46'; Billy Cook 67'	Report

6 April 1928	West Ham	0–0	Aston Villa	Boleyn Ground
		Report

7 April 1928	Blackburn	0–1	Aston Villa	Ewood Park
		Report	Billy Armfield 17'

9 April 1928	Aston Villa	1–0	West Ham	Villa Park
	Arthur Dorrell 63'	Report

14 April 1928	Aston Villa	3–1	Cardiff	Villa Park
	Joe Beresford 20'; Tommy Smart 84' (pen); Pongo Waring 89'	Report

21 April 1928	Everton	3–2	Aston Villa	Goodison Park
		Report	Pongo Waring 82'; Jimmy Gibson 89'

28 April 1928	Aston Villa	2–2	Bolton	Villa Park
	Billy Walker 80'; Billy Armfield 84'	Report

2 May 1928	Aston Villa	3–0	Huddersfield	Villa Park
	Billy Walker 25'; Arthur Dorrell 44'; Pongo Waring 67'	Report

5 May 1928	Sheffield Wednesday	2–0	Aston Villa	Hillsborough
		Report

Source: avfchistory.co.uk
