= 1926–27 Aston Villa F.C. season =

English football club season

Aston Villa
1926–27 season
- President: Patrick Hannon
- Manager: Billy Smith
- Stadium: Villa Park
- First Division: 10th
- FA Cup: Fifth round

Second City Derby
- 15—9—7

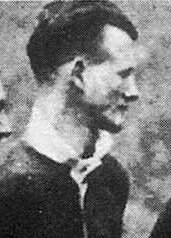
Jimmy Gibson

The 1926–27 Football League season in English football was Aston Villa's 35th season in The Football League.

W. J. "Billy" Smith (1893–1957) was a secretary/committee member of Aston Villa F.C. from August 1926 to May 1934. During this time, this was the equivalent of the modern day manager's position.

Dicky York bagged 13 goals in 43 games in 1926–27. In the Second City derby Villa won both home and away. Arthur Dorrell and Billy Walker scored in the 2–1 victory at St Andrews. Billy Cook, George Stephenson and Dicky York (2) scored in the 4–2 victory at Villa Park.

In September 1926 Villa were beaten 2–1 at Anfield. As the Boxing Day fixture approached The Times tipped Villa to beat Sheffield United following the Villains 3–0 victory over Huddersfield.

Right-half Jimmy Gibson played almost 200 games for Partick before a transfer to Aston Villa for a then-record fee of £7,500 in June 1927. He made 227 appearances for Aston Villa, during which time they were runners-up in the Football League twice (1930–31 and 1932–33) but were relegated in his final season with the club, 1935–36. There were also debuts for Billy Kingdon (223), Bill Johnson, Billy Cook (57) and Joe Nicholson (1).

== First Division ==
Pos	Team	Pld	W	D	L	GF	GA	GAv	Pts
8	Sheffield United	42	17	10	15	74	86	0.860	44
9	Liverpool	42	18	7	17	69	61	1.131	43
10	Aston Villa	42	18	7	17	81	83	0.976	43
11	Arsenal	42	17	9	16	77	86	0.895	43
12	Derby County	42	17	7	18	86	73	1.178	41

Source: World Football
Rules for classification: 1) Points; 2) Goal average; 3) Goals scored

=== Matches ===
28 August 1926	Newcastle United	4–0	Aston Villa	St James' Park
		Report

30 August 1926	Aston Villa	1–1	Liverpool	Villa Park
	Len Capewell	Report

4 September 1926	Aston Villa	1–1	Burnley	Villa Park
	Len Capewell	Report

8 September 1926	Liverpool	2–1	Aston Villa	Anfield
		Report	George Stephenson

11 September 1926	Cardiff City	2–3	Aston Villa	Ninian Park
		Report	Dicky York; Len Capewell; Billy Kingdon

15 September 1926	Leeds United	3–1	Aston Villa	Elland Road
		Report	Billy Kirton

18 September 1926	Aston Villa	1–2	Bury	Villa Park
	George Stephenson	Report

25 September 1926	Aston Villa	3–4	Bolton Wanderers	Villa Park
	Dicky York; Wally Harris; Billy Walker	Report

2 October 1926	Manchester United	2–1	Aston Villa	Old Trafford
		Report	Dicky York

9 October 1926	Aston Villa	3–1	Derby County	Villa Park
	Arthur Dorrell; Wally Harris; George Stephenson	Report

16 October 1926	Sunderland	1–1	Aston Villa	Roker Park
		Report	George Stephenson

23 October 1926	Aston Villa	2–0	West Bromwich Albion	Villa Park
	Wally Harris; Billy Walker	Report

30 October 1926	Aston Villa	2–1	Birmingham City	St Andrew's
	Arthur Dorrell; Billy Walker	Report

6 November 1926	Aston Villa	2–3	Tottenham Hotspur	Villa Park
	Billy Walker (2)	Report

13 November 1926	West Ham United	5–1	Aston Villa	Upton Park
		Report	Arthur Dorrell

20 November 1926	Aston Villa	2–2	Sheffield Wednesday	Villa Park
	Dicky York; Billy Kingdon	Report

27 November 1926	Leicester City	5–1	Aston Villa	Filbert Street
		Report	Billy Walker

4 December 1926	Aston Villa	5–3	Everton	Villa Park
	Len Capewell (3); Arthur Dorrell; George Stephenson	Report

11 December 1926	Blackburn Rovers	0–2	Aston Villa	Ewood Park
		Report	Len Capewell (2)

18 December 1926	Aston Villa	3–0	Huddersfield Town	Villa Park
	Arthur Dorrell; Billy Walker; George Stephenson	Report

25 December 1926	Aston Villa	4–0	Sheffield United	Villa Park
	Dicky York; Len Capewell; George Stephenson (2)	Report

27 December 1926	Sheffield United	3–1	Aston Villa	Bramall Lane
		Report	Len Capewell

28 December 1926	Aston Villa	5–1	Leeds United	Villa Park
	Len Capewell; Arthur Dorrell; Billy Walker; Dicky York; George Stephenson	Report

15 January 1927	Aston Villa	1–2	Newcastle United	Villa Park
	Arthur Dorrell	Report

22 January 1927	Burnley	6–3	Aston Villa	Turf Moor
		Report	Len Capewell (2); George Stephenson

29 January 1927	Aston Villa	4–3	Blackburn Rovers	Villa Park
	Billy Walker (2); Len Capewell (2)	Report

31 January 1927	Aston Villa	0–0	Cardiff City	Villa Park
		Report

5 February 1927	Bury	0–1	Aston Villa	Gigg Lane
		Report	Len Capewell

12 February 1927	Bolton Wanderers	0–2	Aston Villa	Burnden Park
		Report	Dicky York (2)

19 February 1927	Aston Villa	2–0	Manchester United	Villa Park
	Billy Cook; Dicky York	Report

26 February 1927	Derby County	2–3	Aston Villa	Baseball Ground
		Report	George Stephenson; Billy Cook (2)

5 March 1927	Aston Villa	3–1	Sunderland	Villa Park
	Billy Walker (2); Billy Cook	Report

12 March 1927	West Bromwich Albion	6–2	Aston Villa	The Hawthorns
		Report	Dicky York (2)

19 March 1927	Aston Villa	4–2	Birmingham City	Villa Park
	Billy Cook; George Stephenson; Dicky York	Report

26 March 1927	Tottenham Hotspur	0–1	Aston Villa	White Hart Lane
		Report	Billy Cook

2 April 1927	Aston Villa	1–5	West Ham United	Villa Park
	Billy Cook	Report

9 April 1927	Sheffield Wednesday	3–1	Aston Villa	Hillsborough
		Report	Billy Cook

15 April 1927	Arsenal	2–1	Aston Villa	Highbury
		Report	Billy Walker

16 April 1927	Aston Villa	2–0	Leicester City	Villa Park
	Billy Cook; Jock Johnstone	Report

18 April 1927	Aston Villa	2–3	Arsenal	Villa Park
	Billy Walker; George Stephenson	Report

23 April 1927	Everton	2–2	Aston Villa	Goodison Park
		Report	Billy Walker (2)

7 May 1927	Huddersfield Town	0–0	Aston Villa	Leeds Road
		Report

Source: avfchistory.co.uk

== FA Cup ==
42 of the 44 First and Second Division clubs entered the competition at the Third round stage, along with Third Division Millwall and Plymouth Argyle. Also given a bye to this round of the draw was amateur side Corinthian. Carlisle United, Poole and Rhyl were last teams from the qualifying rounds remaining in the competition.

The matches were scheduled for Saturday, 8 January 1927. Four matches were drawn and went to replays in the following midweek fixture, of which one went to a second replay.

Tie no	Home team	Score	Away team	Date
29	Cardiff City	2–1	Aston Villa	8 January 1927
