= Hallewell Rogers =

British politician

Sir Hallewell Rogers DL

Member of Parliament for Birmingham Moseley
- In office 14 December 1918 – 11 February 1921
- Preceded by: Leverton Harris (East Worcestershire)
- Succeeded by: Patrick Hannon

Personal details
- Born: 25 February 1864
- Died: 16 November 1931 (aged 67)
- Party: Conservative
- Other political affiliations: Liberal Unionist

Sir Hallewell Rogers, DL (25 February 1864 – 16 November 1931) was a British Conservative politician who was Member of Parliament and Lord Mayor of Birmingham.

== Political career ==
Rogers was elected Lord Mayor of Birmingham in November 1902, serving two consecutive terms until November 1904. He stood for the Liberal Unionist Party, a Liberal breakaway faction led by fellow Brummie Joseph Chamberlain. The party in 1912 merged with the Conservative party, for which Rogers later entered parliament.

He was appointed Honorary Colonel of the 3rd South Midland Brigade, Royal Field Artillery, in 1913.

Rogers was elected member of parliament for Birmingham Moseley at the 1918 General Election. He resigned in February 1921, precipitating a by-election in March 1921.

In 1925, he was appointed a deputy lieutenant for Warwickshire.

Parliament of the United Kingdom
New constituency	Member of Parliament for Birmingham Moseley; 1918–1921	Succeeded by Patrick Hannon
Civic offices
Preceded by John Henry Lloyd	Lord Mayor of Birmingham; 1902–1904	Succeeded by Rowland Hill Berkeley
