= 1921 Birmingham Moseley by-election =

By-election in the United Kingdom

The 1921 Birmingham Moseley by-election was held on 4 March 1921 after the resignation of the incumbent Coalition Conservative MP, Hallewell Rogers. It was retained by the Coalition Conservative candidate Patrick Hannon who was unopposed.
