= Birmingham Moseley =

Parliamentary constituency in the United Kingdom, 1918–1950

- Former borough constituency for the House of Commons
- Local government in West Midlands: West Midlands

1918–1950
- Seats: One
- Created from: East Worcestershire
- Replaced by: Birmingham King's Norton and Birmingham Hall Green
- During its existence contributed to new seat(s) of: Birmingham Acock's Green

Birmingham Moseley was a constituency of the House of Commons of the Parliament of the United Kingdom from 1918 to 1950. It elected one Member of Parliament (MP) by the first-past-the-post system of election.

== Boundaries ==
Between 1885 and 1918 the parliamentary borough of Birmingham was split into seven single-member divisions. The Representation of the People Act 1918 provided for a redistribution of Birmingham into twelve constituencies, one of which was Birmingham Moseley. Moseley was the south-westernmost of the Birmingham seats established in 1918.

1918–1945: The county borough of Birmingham wards of Acocks Green and Sparkhill, and parts of the wards of Balsall Heath, Kings Norton, Moseley and King's Heath, and Sparkbrook.

1945–1950: The county borough of Birmingham wards of Moseley and King's Heath, and Sparkhill, and the part of the King's Norton ward in the existing constituency.

By the 1935 United Kingdom general election, the electorate of the Moseley division exceeded 100,000 voters. Towards the end of the Second World War it was decided to instruct the Boundary Commission for England to prepare a scheme to divide the seats with more than 100,000 voters. This was provided for by the House of Commons (Redistribution of Seats) Act 1944, as an interim measure before the first general review of all the constituencies took place later in the decade.

At the 1945 United Kingdom general election, the constituency was divided into two. The Acock's Green and Hall Green wards became part of the new seat of Birmingham Acock's Green. The remainder of the previous Moseley remained as that division.

As a result of the first general review, the Moseley division disappeared at the 1950 United Kingdom general election.

== Members of Parliament ==
Election	Member	Party
1918	Sir Hallewell Rogers	Conservative
1921 by-election	Sir Patrick Hannon	Conservative
1950	Constituency abolished	

== Elections ==
=== Elections in the 1910s ===
General election 1918: Birmingham Moseley
Party		Candidate	Votes	%
C	Unionist	Hallewell Rogers	16,161	69.2
	Labour	Robert Dunstan	3,789	16.2
	Liberal	Wilfred Hill	3,422	14.6
Majority			12,372	53.0
Turnout			23,372	56.3
Registered electors				
	Unionist win (new seat)			
C indicates candidate endorsed by the coalition government.

=== Elections in the 1920s ===
1921 Birmingham Moseley by-election
Party		Candidate	Votes	%	±%
C	Unionist	Patrick Hannon	Unopposed		
	Unionist hold				
C indicates candidate endorsed by the coalition government.

General election 1922: Birmingham Moseley
Party	Candidate	Votes	%	±%
Unionist	Patrick Hannon	Unopposed		
Unionist hold				

General election 1923: Birmingham Moseley
Party	Candidate	Votes	%	±%
Unionist	Patrick Hannon	19,628	71.3	N/A
Liberal	Janet Clarkson	7,904	28.7	New
Majority		11,724	42.6	N/A
Turnout		27,532	63.1	N/A
Unionist hold		Swing	N/A	

General election 1924: Birmingham Moseley
Party	Candidate	Votes	%	±%
Unionist	Patrick Hannon	24,333	77.2	+5.9
Labour	George Pearce Blizard	7,183	22.8	New
Majority		17,150	54.4	+11.8
Turnout		31,516	70.2	+7.1
Unionist hold		Swing		

General election 1929: Birmingham Moseley
Party	Candidate	Votes	%	±%
Unionist	Patrick Hannon	33,820	56.8	−20.4
Labour	Frank George Bushnell	15,733	26.4	+3.6
Liberal	Arthur Mark Meek	9,388	15.7	New
Independent Labour	George Brigden	675	1.1	New
Majority		18,087	30.4	−24.0
Turnout		59,616	73.1	+2.9
Unionist hold		Swing	-12.0	

=== Elections in the 1930s ===
General election 1931: Birmingham Moseley
Party	Candidate	Votes	%	±%
Conservative	Patrick Hannon	53,041	79.8	+23.0
Labour	Frank G. Lloyd	13,399	20.2	−6.2
Majority		39,642	59.6	+29.2
Turnout		66,440	72.1	−1.0
Conservative hold		Swing	+14.6	

General election 1935: Birmingham Moseley
Party	Candidate	Votes	%	±%
Conservative	Patrick Hannon	43,885	71.4	−8.4
Labour	Julius Silverman	17,543	28.6	+8.4
Majority		26,342	42.8	−16.8
Turnout		61,428	60.7	−11.4
Conservative hold		Swing	-8.4	

General Election 1939–40

Another General Election was required to take place before the end of 1940. The political parties had been making preparations for an election to take place and by the Autumn of 1939, the following candidates had been selected;

- Conservative: Patrick Hannon
- Labour: Miss J S Wells

=== Elections in the 1940s ===
General election 1945: Birmingham Moseley
Party	Candidate	Votes	%
Conservative	Patrick Hannon	22,063	51.2
Labour	Arthur Leslie Nalder Stephens	21,070	48.8
Majority		993	2.4
Turnout		43,133	69.7
Registered electors			
Conservative win (new boundaries)			
