= Ben Olney =

English footballer

Personal information
- Full name: Benjamin Albert Olney
- Date of birth: 30 March 1899
- Place of birth: Holborn, England
- Date of death: 23 September 1943 (aged 44)
- Place of death: Derby, England
- Position: Goalkeeper

Senior career*
Years	Team	Apps	(Gls)
- Fairleys Athletic
- Aston Park Rangers
- Stourbridge
1921–1927	Derby County	223	(0)
1927–1930	Aston Villa	84	(0)
- Bilston United
- Walsall
- Shrewsbury Town
- Moor Green
Total		307+	(0+)

International career
1928	England	2	(0)
- * Club domestic league appearances and goals

Benjamin Albert Olney (30 March 1899 – 23 September 1943) was an English international footballer, who played as a goalkeeper.

== Career ==
Born in Holborn, Olney played professionally for Derby County and Aston Villa, and earned two caps for England in 1928.

He also played for Fairleys Athletic, Aston Park Rangers, Stourbridge, Bilston United, Walsall, Shrewsbury Town and Moor Green.

In June 1928 Olney played in England's 3–2 victory over the South African XI.
