= George Brown (footballer, born 1907) =

Scottish footballer (1907–1988)

Personal information
- Full name: George Clark Phillips Brown
- Date of birth: 7 January 1907
- Place of birth: Glasgow, Scotland
- Date of death: 1988 (aged 80–81)
- Place of death: Glasgow, Scotland
- Position: Left half

Senior career*
Years	Team	Apps	(Gls)
–	Ashfield		
1929–1942	Rangers	229	(22)

International career
1930–1938	Scotland	19	(0)
1931–1936	Scottish Football League XI	5	(0)
1941	Scotland (wartime)	1	(0)
- * Club domestic league appearances and goals

George Clark Phillips Brown (7 January 1907 – 1988) was a Scottish footballer who played for Rangers and the Scotland national team at left half.

== Football career ==
Brown was born in Glasgow on 7 January 1907. He joined Rangers in September 1929 from Ashfield and made his debut against Ayr United in November of that year. He remained at Rangers for the remainder of his career, winning a total of seven League Championships and four Scottish Cups before retiring in 1942.

He was capped 19 times by Scotland, making his debut against Wales in October 1930. He captained Scotland on two occasions. Brown also played in one unofficial wartime international, in February 1941.

== After football ==
After retiring from playing, Brown became a director at Rangers. He was also a school teacher, having graduated from the University of Glasgow, and became headmaster of Bellahouston Academy in Glasgow.

== See also ==
- List of Scotland national football team captains
- List of Scotland wartime international footballers
