= Oliver Tidman =

Former English footballer

Personal information
- Full name: Oliver Eustace Tidman
- Date of birth: 16 May 1911
- Place of birth: Margate, England
- Date of death: 20 December 2000 (aged 89)
- Place of death: Tunbridge Wells, England
- Height: 5 ft 9 1/2 in (1.77 m)
- Position: Outside left

Senior career*
| Years | Team | Apps | (Gls) |
- Middlesex Wanderers
- Tufnell Park
| 1932–1935 | Aston Villa | 1 | (0) |
| 1935–1936 | Stockport County | 24 | (4) |
| 1936–1937 | Bristol Rovers | 16 | (1) |
| 1937–1938 | Clapton Orient | | |
| 1938–1948 | Chelmsford City | 14 | (2) |
- * Club domestic league appearances and goals

Oliver Eustace Tidman (16 May 1911 – 20 December 2000) was an English footballer who played as an outside left.

== Career ==
In 1932, Tidman signed for Aston Villa from Tufnell Park. On 11 February 1933, Tidman made his only appearance for the club in a 1–0 away win against Chelsea. In 1935, Tidman signed for Stockport County, making 24 Football League appearances, scoring four times. In 1936, Tidman signed for Bristol Rovers, making 16 league appearances, scoring once. Tidman later played for Clapton Orient and Chelmsford City, signing for each club in 1937 and 1938 respectively.
