= Harry Morton (footballer) =

English footballer (1909–1974)

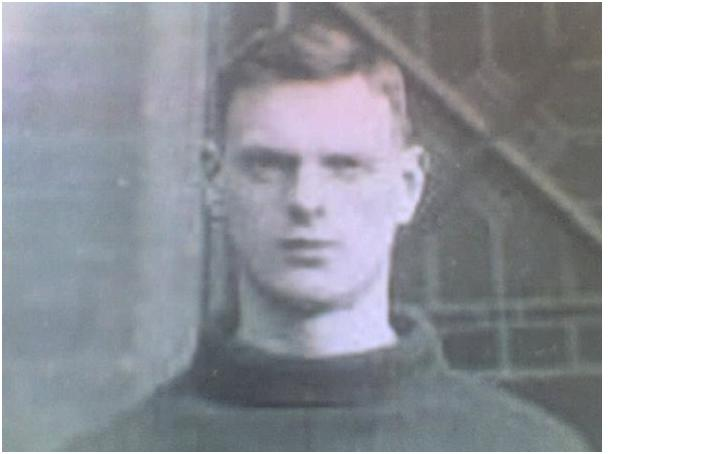

Personal information
- Full name: Harold Morton
- Date of birth: 9 January 1909
- Place of birth: Chadderton, Lancashire, England
- Date of death: 4 April 1974 (aged 65)
- Place of death: Chadderton, Lancashire, England
- Height: 5 ft 9 3/4 in (1.77 m)
- Position: Goalkeeper

Youth career
- Chadderton Sunday School
- Oldham Boys
- Platt Brothers Ironworks
- Middleton Road Primitives

Senior career*
| Years | Team | Apps | (Gls) |
- Royal Welsh Fusiliers
| 1930–1937 | Aston Villa | 192 | (0) |
| 1937–1939 | Everton | 27 | (0) |
| 1939–1940 | Burnley | 0 | (0) |
- * Club domestic league appearances and goals

Harold "Harry" Morton (9 January 1909 – 4 April 1974) was an English professional footballer who played as a goalkeeper for Aston Villa in the 1930s.

== Football career ==
=== Early career ===
Morton was born in Chadderton, near Oldham, Lancashire, and after working his way up through the local football leagues, he had trials with Bury, Southampton F.C. and Bolton Wanderers. However, before he was able to embark on a football career, he did his National service with the Royal Welsh Fusiliers serving with the British Army on the Rhine. He was spotted by Aston Villa Scouts Aston Villa during a match between the Villains and the B.A.O.R football team in Biebrich Germany. Impressed by his performance they asked the British Army permission to take him on. He signed with Aston Villa in 1930 and debuted his first division association football match against Manchester City at Maine Road in November 1931, replacing Biddestone who had been injured before kick off.

=== Aston Villa ===
After a trial with Villa in October 1930, he was signed as an amateur and made his club debut for the reserves in a Central League game against Everton Reserves on 22 November 1930. He went on to sign as a professional in March 1931. By the end of the 1931–32 season he had displaced Fred Biddlestone as first choice 'keeper and missed only one league game over the next three seasons, helping Villa to claim the runners-up position in the Football League in the 1932–33 season and reach the semi-finals of the FA Cup in 1933–34.

His form with Villa brought him to the attention of the England selectors but, although he had a trial in 1934, he was unsuccessful and the selectors chose Arsenal's Frank Moss instead to replace the injured Harry Hibbs.

=== Everton ===
In March 1937, Morton moved to Everton, making his debut in a 2–1 defeat at West Bromwich Albion on 13 March 1937. In his two years at Goodison Park, Morton was the understudy to Ted Sagar and only made 27 league and 2 FA Cup appearances. In Everton's Championship winning season, 1938–39, Morton only made one appearance.

In the summer of 1939, Morton was transferred to Burnley, but his career was brought to an end following the outbreak of the Second World War.
