= Fred Biddlestone =

English footballer

Personal information
- Full name: Thomas Frederick Biddlestone
- Date of birth: 26 November 1906
- Place of birth: Pensnett, England
- Date of death: January 1982 (aged 75)
- Height: 5 ft 11 3/4 in (1.82 m)
- Position: Goalkeeper

Senior career*
| Years | Team | Apps | (Gls) |
- Bilston Boys' Club
- Hickman's Park Rangers
- Moxley Wesleyans
- Wednesbury Town
- Sunbeam Motors
- Bloxwich Strollers
- Walsall
| 1930–1939 | Aston Villa | 151 | (0) |
| 1939–???? | Mansfield Town | | |
- * Club domestic league appearances and goals

Thomas Frederick Biddlestone (26 November 1906 – 1982) was an English professional football goalkeeper, best known for his time at Aston Villa. He signed for Villa from Walsall, and then played for Mansfield Town before retiring.

Biddlestone signed with Mansfield of League Division III (South) in August 1939 and was set to play against his old team Walsall in September 1939 when War was declared.
