= Teddy Bowen =

English footballer

Samuel Edward Bowen (17 November 1903 – 4 March 1981) was an English footballer in the early years of professional football who played about 200 games for Aston Villa.

He sailed North to Sweden with the team on Aston Villa's first foreign tour in May 1926. Örgryte celebrated a major success when beating Aston Villa 5–2. Villa were defeated by Gothenburg-combined (Kombinerol Gotesburgslag). Villa won 11 - 2 over the select Oslo-combined Lyn og Frig including FK Lyn players. Bowen took advantage of the opportunity to join the fishing party.
