= Danny Blair =

Scottish footballer (1905-1985)

Personal information
- Full name: Daniel Blair
- Date of birth: 2 February 1905
- Place of birth: Parkhead, Scotland
- Date of death: 7 March 1985 (aged 80)
- Place of death: Blackpool, Lancashire, England
- Height: 5 ft 5 1/2 in (1.66 m)
- Positions: Wing half; full back

Youth career
- Davonport Albion
- Toronto Scottish
- Willys Overland Motor Works

Senior career*
| Years | Team | Apps | (Gls) |
| 1924–1925 | Providence Clamdiggers | 36 | (5) |
| 1925 | Parkhead Juniors | ? | (?) |
| 1925–1931 | Clyde | 179 | (2) |
| 1931–1936 | Aston Villa | 129 | (0) |
| 1936–1939 | Blackpool | 121 | (0) |

International career
| 1927–1928 | Scottish League XI | 3 | (0) |
| 1928–1932 | Scotland | 8 | (0) |
- * Club domestic league appearances and goals

Daniel Blair (2 February 1905 – 7 March 1985) was a Scottish football player who began his senior career in North America before finishing it in England. He also earned eight caps with the Scotland national team.

== Early career ==
Although he was born in Parkhead, Scotland, Blair began with his career with junior clubs Rasharkin in 1920 and Cullybackey in 1921, while he was a student in Ireland. He then went on to play in Toronto, Ontario, Canada, with Davonport Albion in 1922. He then moved to Toronto Scottish, and Willys Overland in 1923, before signing with the Providence Clamdiggers of the American Soccer League in 1924.

== Return to the UK ==
After one season, he returned to Scotland where he signed with Parkhead Juniors, shortly before moving to Clyde in April 1925. He spent six seasons with Clyde before transferring to Aston Villa of the Football League for £7,000 on 24 October 1931. Blair played 138 League and Cup games for Aston Villa. He played 37 times as Villa finished runners up to Arsenal in the League Championship in 1932–33 and was a member of their team that reached the 1934 FA Cup semi final, where they were heavily beaten by the eventual winner Manchester City. He then joined Blackpool. He made his debut for the Tangerines in the opening League game of the 1936–37 season, in a 2–1 victory at Leicester City on 29 August 1936. He went on to be an ever-present that campaign, starting in all of the club's 42 League games and two FA Cup games, as the team won promotion from Division Two. He remained with Blackpool until the Second World War in 1939. Throughout his whole career he played in 408 League matches and scored two goals, both for Clyde.

== International career ==
Blair made his International debut for Scotland in a 4–2 win over Wales at Ibrox in October 1928. He won a total of eight caps for his country. He captained the team against Austria in May 1931.

He received league honours with the Glasgow Junior League against the breakaway Intermediate League in 1925, and later on with the senior Scottish League XI three times between 1927 and 1928.

Selected to represent the Scottish FA XI team that toured Canada in 1927, Blair featured in eleven matches in total. He earned further honours with Glasgow in the annual inter-city fixture Sheffield.

== Achievements ==
Clyde

- Scottish Division Two promotion: 1925–26
- Glasgow Cup winner: 1925–26

Aston Villa

- Football League First Division runner-up: 1932–33

Blackpool

- Football League Second Division promotion: 1936–37
- Lancashire Senior Cup winner: 1936–37

Scotland

- British Home Championship winner: 1928–29
  - Runner-up: 1931–32

== See also ==
- List of Scotland national football team captains
