= Reg Chester =

English footballer

Reginald Chester
Personal information
- Full name: Reginald Arthur Chester
- Date of birth: 21 November 1904
- Place of birth: Long Eaton, Derbyshire, England
- Date of death: 24 April 1977 (aged 72)
- Place of death: England
- Height: 6 ft 0 in (1.83 m)
- Position: Forward

Senior career*
Years	Team	Apps	(Gls)
1925–1935	Aston Villa	97	(34)
1935–1935	Manchester United	13	(1)
1935–1937	Huddersfield Town	25	(7)
1937–19??	Darlington	?	(?)
- * Club domestic league appearances and goals

Reginald Alfred Chester (21 November 1904 – 24 April 1977) was an English footballer who played as a forward.

Born in Long Eaton, Derbyshire.

Reg Chester also played in the Football League for Manchester United, Huddersfield Town and Darlington.
