= W. J. Smith =

English football manager, secretary, and committee member

W. J. "Billy" Smith (1893–1957) was a committee member and Secretary of Aston Villa F.C. at a time when team selection was by committee. The equivalent of the modern day manager, he held this position from August 1926 to May 1934.

Smith was the last person to be a Secretary. Jimmy McMullan was appointed as manager when Billy Smith retired. Smith joined Aston Villa as a 17-year-old in 1910 and remained at the club until his death in 1957. His association with Villa lasted 47 years.
