= Tom Waring =

English footballer (1906–1980)

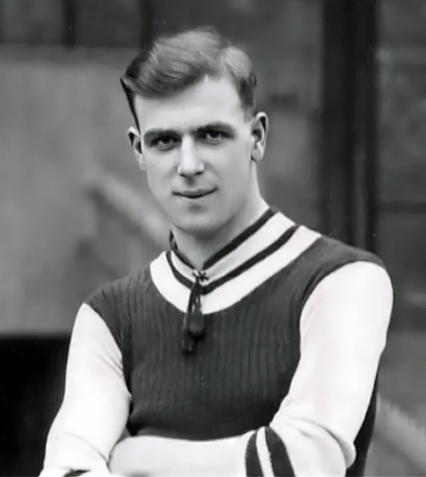
- Waring in 1927

Personal information
- Full name: Thomas Waring
- Date of birth: 12 October 1906
- Place of birth: Birkenhead, England
- Date of death: 20 December 1980 (aged 74)
- Height: 1.87 m (6 ft 2 in)
- Position: Centre forward

Senior career*
| Years | Team | Apps | (Gls) |
| 1926–1928 | Tranmere Rovers | 24 | (23) |
| 1928–1935 | Aston Villa | 216 | (159) |
| 1935–1936 | Barnsley | 18 | (7) |
| 1936 | Wolverhampton Wanderers | 10 | (3) |
| 1936–1938 | Tranmere Rovers | 74 | (42) |
| 1938 | Accrington Stanley | 22 | (10) |
| 1938–1939 | Bath City | | |
| 1939 | Ellesmere Port Town | | |
| 1939 | Graysons | | |
| 1939 | Birkenhead Docks | | |
| 1939 | Harrowby | | |
| 1939–1940 | New Brighton | 0 | (0) |
| 1941-1942 | Everton | 3 | (1) |
| 1946 | Ellesmere Port Town | | |
| Total | | 367 | (245) |

International career
| 1931–1932 | England | 5 | (4) |
- * Club domestic league appearances and goals

Thomas Waring (12 October 1906 – 20 December 1980) was an English professional association footballer. Nicknamed "Pongo" after a famous cartoon of the time called Pongo the Pup, Waring is one of Aston Villa's all-time great centre forwards. In his career, he scored 243 league goals in 363 matches over 12 seasons for 5 different clubs.

== Early life ==
Thomas Waring was born on 12 October 1906 at 4 Chapel Place in Higher Tranmere. He was the third child (out of 4) of Henry Arthur and Charlotte Waring. The Waring family lived at 15 Walker Place, which was a ten-minute walk from Tranmere Rovers' ground.

== Career ==
Tom played for quite a few junior teams in the Tranmere area before catching the eye of the legendary Rovers scout Jack Lee. Lee offered Waring a place in the Tranmere reserves and a casual job helping out on matchdays. Tom would sell cigarettes and chocolate to the fans in the stands as well as help in preparing the ground for matches before he was handed a professional contract. He signed for Tranmere in 1926 at the relatively late age of 20 and made his debut on 29 August 1927 away to Rotherham United. He scored 23 goals in 24 games, including 6 goals in an 11–1 victory against Durham City in January 1928 which brought him to the attention of First Division clubs. He moved to Aston Villa for £4,700 in 1928.

=== Aston Villa ===
A crowd of 23,000 saw him play on his Villa debut in a reserve game against local rivals Birmingham City, in which he scored a first half hat-trick.

His 226 appearances for Villa yielded 167 goals, including 10 hat-tricks and a club record 49 league goals in the 1930–31 season, 50 goals in all competitions. He is considered an Aston Villa legend, a reputation buoyed by his likeable personality as discussed by Villa's captain of the day, Billy Walker. In Walker's autobiography, he wrote:

There were no rules for Pongo. Nobody knew what time he would turn up for training—ten o'clock, eleven o'clock, twelve o'clock, it made no odds. Nobody on the staff could do anything with him although I think I can claim, as the captain in his days, to be the only person able to handle him. He was a funny lad indeed. We started the weeks training on Tuesday mornings and every Tuesday he followed a habit which he could never break. He would go round all the refreshment bars on the ground and finish off the lemonade customers, storing the remains in the bottles! Then he would start a little of his training—but that seldom lasted very long.

The Birmingham Daily Gazette described Pongo in his heyday at Villa:

Over 6ft tall and tough as teak, his goal dashes were electrifying and if he could not get adequate service from his wings he went out and got the ball himself. He would streak his way through opposing defences, and then turn around grinning all over his face!

During the time of Eric Cantona's altercation with a fan, an Olton pensioner stated that Waring - "Picked the ball up then he jumped into the crowd and gave him a thump"

Whilst playing football, Waring also worked for The Hercules Motor and Cycle Company in Aston.

=== Later clubs ===
In November 1935, Waring went to Barnsley, angering many Villa fans and prompting 5,000 of them to call for his return to the club. After a spell at Barnsley, Waring also played for Wolverhampton Wanderers, Tranmere Rovers (for a second time), Accrington Stanley, Bath City, Ellesmere Port Town, Graysons, Birkenhead Docks and Harrowby. He guested for New Brighton in 1939–40, and after the war he returned for a second spell with Ellesmere Port Town.

== International career ==
Waring was also capped five times by England, scoring four goals between 1931 and 1932.

== Death ==
Waring died in December 1980 at the age of 74. His ashes were scattered in the Holte End goal mouth before a game against Stoke City.

== Career statistics ==
=== International ===
Appearances and goals by national team and year
| National team | Year | Apps | Goals |
|---|---|---|---|
| England | 1931 | 4 | 3 |
| England | 1932 | 1 | 1 |
| Total | | 5 | 4 |
