= Joe Beresford =

English footballer (1906–1978)

Personal information
- Full name: Joseph Beresford
- Date of birth: 26 February 1906
- Place of birth: Shuttlewood, Derbyshire, England
- Date of death: 26 February 1978 (aged 72)
- Place of death: Birmingham, England
- Height: 5 ft 5 in (1.65 m)
- Position: Inside right

Senior career*
Years	Team	Apps	(Gls)
192?–1927	Mansfield Town		
1927–1935	Aston Villa	224	(66)
1935–19??	Preston North End		

International career
1934	England A	1	(0)
- * Club domestic league appearances and goals

Joseph Beresford (26 February 1906 – 26 February 1978) was an English footballer, who played over 250 games for Aston Villa. Beresford joined Villa from Mansfield Town in 1927 and left in 1935 to Preston North End.

He made one appearance for England on 16 May 1934 against Czechoslovakia.

== Honours ==
Preston North End

- FA Cup runner-up: 1936–37
