= Joe Tate (footballer) =

English footballer

Personal information
- Full name: Joe Thomas Tate
- Date of birth: 4 August 1904
- Place of birth: Old Hill, Cradley Heath, England
- Date of death: 18 May 1973 (aged 68)
- Place of death: Cradley Heath, England
- Height: 6 ft 1 in (1.85 m)
- Position: Left half

Senior career*
Years	Team	Apps	(Gls)
	Stourbridge Council School	?	(?)
	Birch Coppice Primitives	?	(?)
	Grainger's Lane Primitives	?	(?)
	Round Oak Steel Works FC (Brierley Hill)	?	(?)
	Cradley Heath	?	(?)
1925–1935	Aston Villa	180	(2)
	Brierley Hill Alliance	?	(?)

International career
1931–1932	England	3	(0)
- * Club domestic league appearances and goals

Joe Thomas Tate (4 August 1904 in Old Hill, Cradley Heath, England – 18 May 1973 in Cradley Heath) was an English footballer.

== Career ==
=== Club ===
Tate played for Stourbridge Council School, Birch Coppice Primitives, Grainger's Lane Primitives, Round Oak Steel Works FC (Brierley Hill) and Cradley Heath before joining Aston Villa in April 1925. After making a total of 193 appearances, and scoring four goals for the club, he joined Brierley Hill Alliance as player-manager. His wife, Nellie Tate was a teacher at Reddall Hill Primary School, Cradley Heath.

=== International ===
He gained a total of three caps for the England national team.
