= Patrick Hannon =

Irish-born politician, industralist and agriculturist

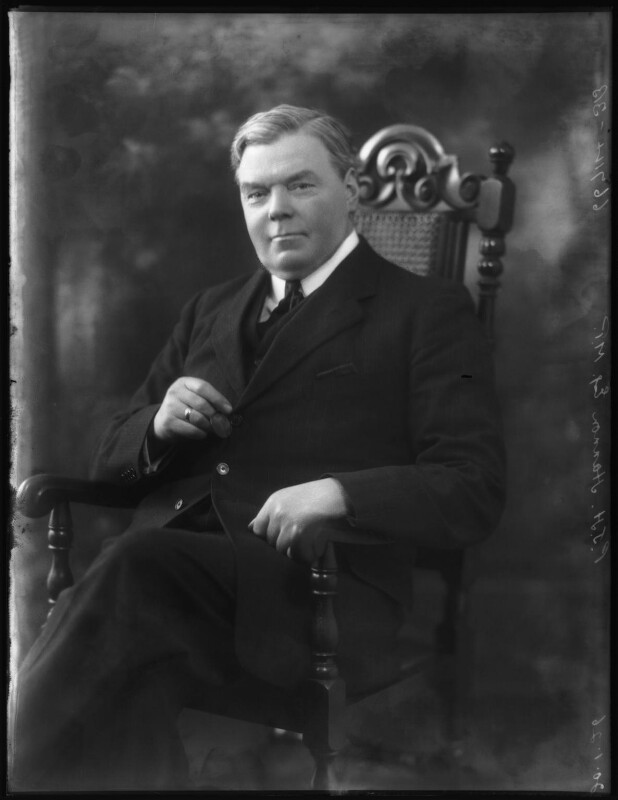
- Hannon in 1926

Member of Parliament for Birmingham Moseley
- In office 4 March 1921—1950
- Preceded by: Hallewell Rogers
- Succeeded by: Constituency abolished

Personal details
- Born: 2 March 1874 Taverane, County Sligo, Ireland
- Died: 10 January 1963 (aged 88) London, England
- Party: Unionist
- Spouse: Mary Wynne
- Education: Royal University of Ireland

Sir Patrick Joseph Henry Hannon FRGS FRSA (1874 - 10 January 1963) was an Irish-born Conservative and Unionist Party politician, industrialist and agriculturalist. He served as Member of Parliament (MP) for Birmingham Moseley from 1921 to 1950 and was active in the British Commonwealth Union. Born in Taverane, Cloonloo near Kilfree Junction, County Sligo in 1874, Hannon was the eldest son of farmer Matthew Hannon of Kilfree.

== Education and early work ==
Hannon studied at the Royal University of Ireland.

Hannon worked in agriculture from 1896 to 1904, in particular as an officer of the Irish Agricultural Organisation Society. He worked from 1896 to 1904 in the fledgling Irish Cooperative Movement, traveling the country setting up local creameries. From 1901 to 1904 Hannon was Director of the Irish Agricultural Wholesale Society. On graduation, his first job was with the Irish Agricultural Organisational Society. He then joined the Irish Agricultural Wholesale Society – later to become Greencore and later still part of the giant food group today named Aryzta. From 1902 to 1907 he visited the United States and Canada on behalf of the Irish Industrial Movement. From 1907 to 1909 he was Director of Agricultural Organisation to the government of Cape Colony and a Justice of the Peace. He married Mary, daughter of Thomas J Wynne of Castlebar.

== Politics ==
In 1910, after time spent in South Africa, Sir Patrick moved to England. Hannon contested Bristol East in 1910 as a Unionist. In the period 1910 to 1914, he was an officer of the Tariff Reform League. He was first elected as a Coalition Unionist in a by-election on 4 March 1921 and entered the House of Commons on 4 March 1921, serving Moseley for almost thirty years. He was also president of the Ideal Benefit Society.

He was first elected as a Coalition Unionist in a by-election on 4 March 1921 and served until the 1950 United Kingdom general election. He then moved to the House of Lords as Sir Patrick Hannon. In 1925/6 he was President of the Birmingham Branch of the British Fascists.

== Life ==
Hannon was a devout Catholic throughout his life. He funded part of the rebuilding of St. Dunstan's Roman Catholic Church in Kings Heath and was the treasurer of the Apostleship of the Sea, an agency of the Catholic Church in support of seafarers. He was the administrative initiator of the Imperial Pioneers, later the British Commonwealth Union. He had a successful business career, being chairman, of amongst other companies, B.S.A. and Jaguar.

The New York Times recalled his unique ambitions: “For half a century he was an aggressive salesman for the Empire and the Commonwealth”. He led many campaigns to aid British world trade as president of the National Union of Manufacturers from 1935 – 1953. Sir Patrick was knighted in 1936 and, having survived a Labour landslide in 1945, retired from the House, undefeated, in 1950.

He died in London on 10 January 1963.

== Bibliography ==
- Papers of Sir Patrick Joseph Henry Hannon MP (1874-1963), UK Parliament Archives Catalogue, Retrieved 2008-07-16
- "Hannon, Sir Patrick Joseph Henry". Who Was Who 1897-2007. 2008.
- Capie, F. (1998) "The Sources and Origins of Britain's Return to Protection, 1931-2", in Parry, Geraint; Marrison, Andrew, eds. (1998). Freedom of Trade and its Reception: 1815-1960: Freedom and Trade - Volume 1. Routledge. pp. pp246–261. ISBN 0-415-15527-4., p.250 (Google Books)
- F. W. S. Craig, Chronology of British Parliamentary By-elections 1833-1987
- Martin Pugh, 'Hurrah for the Blackshirts!': Fascists and Fascism in Britain between the Wars, London: Pimlico, 2006

Parliament of the United Kingdom
Preceded by Sir Hallewell Rogers	Member of Parliament for Birmingham Moseley; 1921–1950	Constituency abolished
