= John Cowan (footballer, born 1870) =

Scottish footballer

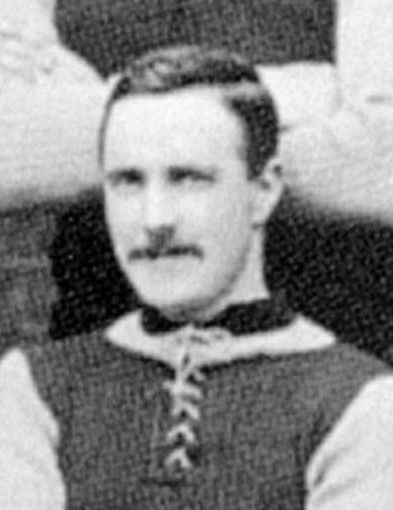
- Cowan in 1897

Personal information
- Full name: John Cowan
- Date of birth: 12 December 1870
- Place of birth: Dumbarton, Scotland
- Date of death: 1937 (aged 66–67)
- Position: Winger

Senior career*
Years	Team	Apps	(Gls)
1890–1892	Vale of Leven	36	(5)
1892–1894	Preston North End	55	(8)
1894–1895	Rangers	16	(3)
1895–1899	Aston Villa	66	(25)
1899	Dundee Harp		
Total		173	(41)
- * Club domestic league appearances and goals

John Cowan (12 December 1870 – 1937) was a Scottish footballer who played in the Football League for Aston Villa and Preston North End.

== Career ==
Cowan was born in Dumbarton; he began his football career with Vale of Leven and joined the stream of Scottish footballers playing in the English League in the summer of 1892, when he joined First Division Preston North End, making his Football League debut at Derby County that September. He missed only four matches as Preston finished runners-up in the League Championship and played for the club in the 1893 FA Cup semi-final replay, scoring in a 2–2 draw, and its second replay in which they were ultimately defeated 2–1 by Everton. He was a near ever-present in 1893–94, missing only one match and scoring four goals in Preston's 18–0 FA Cup first round rout of Southern League Reading in January 1894.

After 16 goals in 64 appearances for The Lilywhites he joined Rangers in the 1894 close season, making his debut against Dumbarton that August. He scored four goals in 17 appearances for the Glasgow club and played in a trial match for the Scotland national team which ultimately did not lead to any full caps before a return to England to join his elder brother James Cowan at Aston Villa the following August. Villa won the League in 1895–96; Cowan scored nine goals in 22 games that season and was part of a forward line that included Johnny Campbell, Jack Devey, Charlie Athersmith and Dennis Hodgetts.

The following season proved the most glorious for Aston Villa. On 30 January 1897, they beat Newcastle United 5–0 in the third round of the FA Cup, and went on to beat Notts County (2–0), Preston North End (3–2) and Liverpool (3–0) to reach the final against Everton. Aston Villa retained the League title ahead of the runners-up, Sheffield United, by 11 points. A crowd of over 60,000 arrived at The Crystal Palace to watch the 1897 FA Cup Final. Athersmith scored the opening goal but Everton hit back with goals from Jack Bell and Dickie Boyle. Aston Villa continued to dominate the game and added two more goals from Fred Wheldon and Jimmy Crabtree. That finished the scoring and therefore Aston Villa had emulated the great 'Invincibles' of Preston North End that achieved the FA Cup and Football League double in 1888–89. Villa scored 73 goals that season with Cowan scoring seven in 15 games.

However 1897–98 proved a disappointment, and Villa finished only sixth in the League, crashing out of the FA Cup in the first round, although Cowan still featured regularly. The following season however, as a result of the form of Stephen Smith, Cowan was unable to obtain a regular place in the 1898–99 League Championship winning team, only playing seven games that season. After 27 goals in 71 appearances for Villa, Cowan moved to Dundee Harp in June 1899 before his eventual retirement in May 1901.

== Career statistics ==
Appearances and goals by club, season and competition
Club	Season	League			FA Cup		Total	
Club	Season	Division	Apps	Goals	Apps	Goals	Apps	Goals
Preston North End	1892–93	First Division	26	1	6	4	32	5
Preston North End	1893–94	First Division	29	7	2	4	31	11
Preston North End	Total		55	8	8	8	63	16
Aston Villa	1895–96	First Division	22	9	1	0	23	9
Aston Villa	1896–97	First Division	15	7	3	2	18	9
Aston Villa	1897–98	First Division	22	5	1	0	23	5
Aston Villa	1898–99	First Division	7	4	0	0	7	4
Aston Villa	Total		66	25	5	2	71	27
Career Total			121	33	13	10	224	43
