= List of Aston Villa F.C. records and statistics =

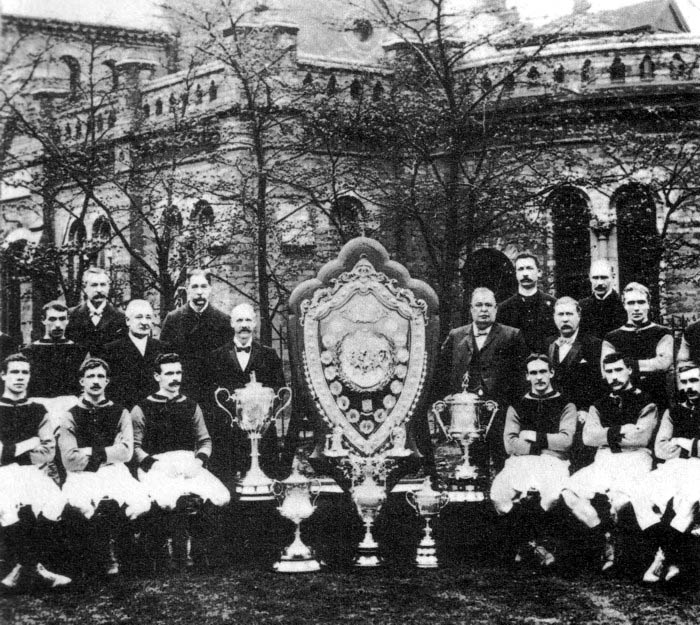
The Aston Villa team of the late 19th century

Aston Villa Football Club are an English professional association football club based in Aston, Birmingham, who currently play in the Premier League. The club was founded in 1874 and were founding members of the Football League in 1888, as well as the Premier League in 1992. They are one of the oldest football clubs in England, having won the First Division Championship seven times and the FA Cup seven times. In 1982, the club became one of only six English clubs to win the European Cup.

This list encompasses the honours won by Aston Villa and the records set by the players and the club. The player records section includes details of the club's leading goalscorers and those who have made the most appearances in first-team competitions. Attendance records at Villa Park are also included in the list.

== Honours ==
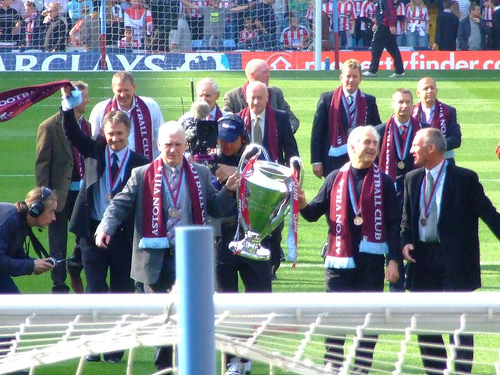
The 1982 European Cup winning squad celebrate the 25th anniversary of their win.

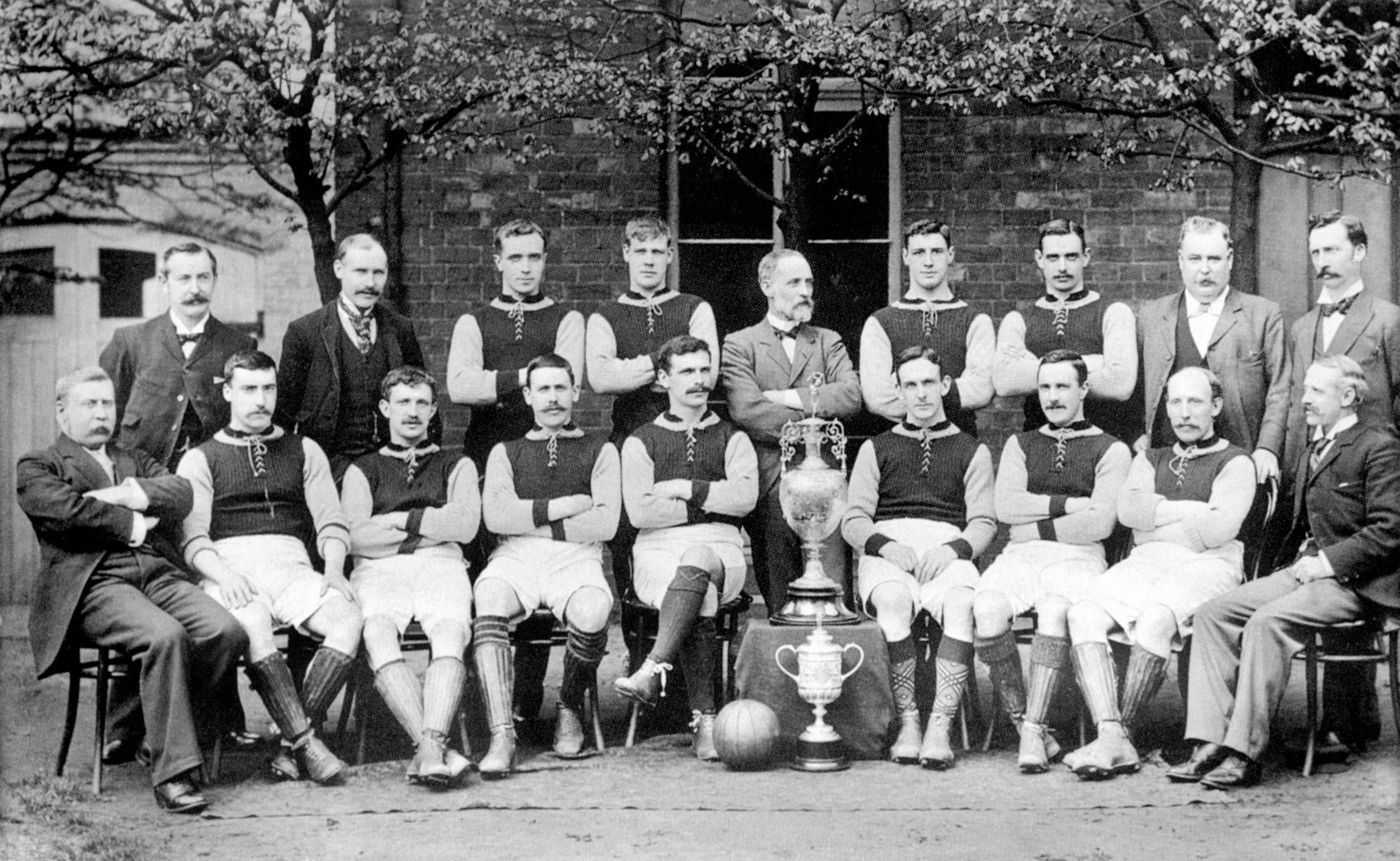
The Aston Villa team of 1896–97 with the First Division Championship and the FA Cup

Aston Villa have won honours both domestically and in European cup competitions. Their most recent honour was a UEFA Europa League win in 2026.

=== European ===
- European Cup:
  - Winners (1): 1982
- UEFA Europa League:
  - Winners (1): 2026
- European Super Cup:
  - Winners (1): 1982–83
  - Runners up (1): 2026-27
- Intertoto Cup:
  - Winners (1): 2001
  - Co-winners (1): 2008^{[C]}

=== Domestic ===
==== League ====
- Football League First Division:^{[A]}
  - Winners (7): 1894, 1896, 1897, 1899, 1900, 1910, 1981
  - Runners up (9): 1889, 1903, 1908, 1911, 1913, 1914, 1931, 1933, 1990
- Premier League:^{[A]}
  - Runners up (1): 1993
- Football League Second Division:^{[A]}
  - Winners (2): 1938, 1960
  - Runners up (2): 1975, 1988
  - Play-Offs (1): 2019
- Football League Third Division:^{[A]}
  - Winners (1): 1972

==== Cups ====
- FA Cup:
  - Winners (7): 1887, 1895, 1897, 1905, 1913, 1920, 1957
  - Runners up (4): 1892, 1924, 2000, 2015
- Football League Cup:
  - Winners (5): 1961, 1975, 1977, 1994, 1996
  - Runners up (4): 1963, 1971, 2010, 2020
- FA Charity Shield:
  - Winners (1): 1981 (shared)^{[B]}
  - Runners up (3): 1910, 1957, 1972
- Sheriff of London Charity Shield:
  - Winners (2): 1899 (shared), 1901
  - Runners up (1): 1900
- Football League War Cup:
  - Winners (1): 1944

=== Youth ===
- FA Youth Cup:
  - Winners (5): 1972, 1980, 2002, 2021, 2025
- FA Premier League Cup
  - Winners (1): 2018
- HKFC Soccer Sevens
  - Winners (7): 2002, 2004, 2007, 2008, 2010, 2016, 2023
- NextGen Cup:
  - Winners (1): 2013

=== Friendly and exhibition ===
- Football World Championship
  - Winners (3): 1887, 1894, 1900 (shared)
- West Bromwich Charity Cup
  - Winners (1): 1890 (shared)
- Bass Charity Vase
  - Winners (3): 1893, 1894, 2018
- Dublin Tournament
  - Winners (1): 2003
- Peace Cup:
  - Winners (1): 2009
- Cup of Traditions
  - Winners (1): 2017
- Queensland Champions Cup
  - Winners (1): 2022
- Al Wahda Challenge Cup
  - Winners (1): 2022
- Orange Trophy
  - Winners (1): 2023
- Trofeo de La Cerámica
  - Winners (1): 2025
- Antonio Puerta Trophy
  - Winners (1): 2026

== Player records ==
Most successful:
Howard Spencer

- Football League First Division: 1895–96, 1896–97, 1898–99, 1899–1900
- FA Cup: 1895, 1897, 1905

Jack Devey, James Cowan

- Football League First Division: 1893–94, 1895–96, 1896–97, 1898–99, 1899–1900
- FA Cup: 1895, 1897
- Baseball: 1890

=== Appearances ===
- Youngest first-team player: Andy Hunter, 15 years 134 days (v. Stafford Road, FA Cup, 13 December 1879)
- Youngest league player: Jimmy Brown, 15 years 349 days (v. Bolton Wanderers, Division Two, 17 September 1969).
- Oldest first-team player: Brad Friedel, 40 years 4 days (v. Liverpool, Premier League, 22 May 2011).

==== Most appearances ====
Competitive matches only. Each column contains appearances in the starting eleven, followed by appearances as substitute in brackets.

Rank	Player	Years	League	FA Cup	League Cup	Other	Total
1	(Scotland) Charlie Aitken	1959–1976	559 (2)	34 (1)	61 (0)	3 (0)	657 (3)
2	(England) Billy Walker	1919–1934	478 (0)	53 (0)	0 (0)	0 (0)	531 (0)
3	(England) Gordon Cowans	1976–1985; 1988–1991	399 (15)	8 (1)	40 (4)	39 (2)	508 (22)
4	(England) Joe Bache	1900–1915	431 (0)	42 (0)	0 (0)	1 (0)	474 (0)
5	(Scotland) Allan Evans	1977–1989	374 (6)	26 (0)	42 (1)	24 (0)	466 (7)
6	(England) Nigel Spink	1979–1996	357 (4)	28 (0)	45 (0)	19 (1)	449 (5)
7	(England) Tommy Smart	1919–1933	405 (0)	47 (0)	0 (0)	0 (0)	452 (0)
8	(England) Gareth Barry	1997–2009	353 (12)	19 (2)	29 (0)	22 (4)	423 (18)
9	(England) Johnny Dixon	1945–1961	392 (0)	38 (0)	0 (0)	0 (0)	430 (0)
10	(England) Dennis Mortimer	1975–1985	315 (1)	21 (0)	38 (0)	30 (0)	404 (1)

Other competitions include European Cup, UEFA Cup and Intertoto Cup

=== Goalscorers ===
- Most goals in a season: Tom 'Pongo' Waring, 50 goals in 1930–31 season.
- Most league goals in a season: Tom 'Pongo' Waring, 49 goals in 1930–31 season.
- In the 1899–1900 season Billy Garraty became the top goalscorer in world football scoring 27 goals in just 33 league games and a total 30 goals in 39 league and cup games.
- Most consecutive matches scored in: Len Capewell, 8 games, 1925–26 season.
- Youngest goalscorer: Andy Hunter, 15 years 134 days (v. Stafford Road, FA Cup, 13 December 1879)
- Oldest goalscorer: Peter Schmeichel, 37 years and 336 days (v. Everton, Premier League, 20 October 2001)

==== Top goalscorers ====
Competitive matches only. Players in bold are still active professionally. Number of appearances in brackets.

Rank	Player	Years	League	FA Cup	League Cup	Other	Total
1	(England) Billy Walker	1919–1933	214 (478)	30 (53)	0 (0)	0 (0)	**244** (531)
2	(England) Harry Hampton	1904–1920	215 (339)	27 (34)	0 (0)	0 (0)	**242** (373)
3	(England) John Devey	1891–1902	169 (268)	18 (38)	0 (0)	0 (2)	**187** (308)
4	(England) Joe Bache	1900–1914	168 (431)	17 (42)	0 (0)	0 (1)	**185** (474)
5	(England) Eric Houghton	1927–1946	160 (361)	10 (31)	0 (0)	0 (0)	**170** (392)
6	(England) Tom 'Pongo' Waring	1928–1935	159 (216)	8 (10)	0 (0)	0 (0)	**167** (226)
7	(England) Johnny Dixon	1945–1961	132 (263)	12 (38)	0 (0)	0 (0)	**144** (430)
8	(Northern Ireland) Peter McParland	1952–1962	97 (293)	19 (36)	4 (11)	0 (1)	**120** (341)
9	(England) Billy Garraty	1897–1908	96 (224)	15 (31)	0 (0)	1 (3)	**112** (258)
10	(England) Ollie Watkins	2020–2026	91 (221)	0 (11)	3 (7)	14 (39)	**108** (278)

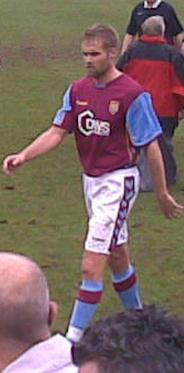
Olof Mellberg, one of only four Villa players to play in two World Cups while at the club, alongside Steve Staunton, Emiliano Martínez and Paul McGrath, during the 2006 FIFA World Cup. He made 69 appearances for Sweden while at Villa.

=== International ===
This section refers only to caps and honours won while an Aston Villa player. Players in bold are still Aston Villa players.

==== Most capped international players ====
Note: internationals with over 50 international caps.

- **John McGinn**, 81 caps for Scotland between 2018 to present.
- Olof Mellberg, 69 caps for Sweden between 2001 and 2008.
- Emiliano Martinez, 67 caps for Argentina between 2021 to 2026.
- Steve Staunton, 64 caps for Republic of Ireland between 1991 and 1998 and 2001 and 2002.
- Paul McGrath, 51 caps for Republic of Ireland between 1989 and 1996.

==== England ====
- First capped players for England: Arthur Alfred Brown and Howard Vaughton on 18 February 1882.
- Most capped player for England: Gareth Southgate, 42 caps.

==== World Cup ====
- First player to play at the World Cup finals: Peter McParland for Northern Ireland against Czechoslovakia on 8 June 1958.
- First player to score at the World Cup finals: Peter McParland for Northern Ireland against Argentina on 11 June 1958.
- First player to score in a World Cup for England: David Platt for England against Belgium on 26 June 1990.
- Most World Cup finals goals: Peter McParland, 5 (1958).
- Most World Cup appearances: Emi Martínez, 15 (2022 and 2026); Paul McGrath, 9 (1990 and 1994); Steve Staunton, 8 (1994 and 2002); Olof Mellberg, 8 (2002 and 2006); Ezri Konsa, 8 (2026).
- Golden Glove: Emi Martínez (2022).
- Most successful players at the World Cup:
  - Winner: Emi Martínez (2022).
  - Runner-up: Emi Martínez (2026).
  - 3rd Place: Alpay Özalan (2002); Ron Vlaar (2014); Ezri Konsa, Morgan Rogers, and Ollie Watkins (2026).
  - 4th Place: David Platt (1990), Lucas Digne (2026).

=== Record transfer fees ===
This section lists the record transfer fees paid by the club for a player. The highest transfer fee received by the club is the £117 million fee paid by Chelsea for Morgan Rogers in July 2026. The sale at the time was a British transfer record. The highest initial fee Aston Villa have ever paid for a player was £52 million for Swiss midfielder Johan Manzambi from Freiburg in July 2026.

Fees Paid

Rank	Player	Fee	From	Date	Ref.
1	(Switzerland) Johan Manzambi	£52m (rising to £59.5m)	(Germany) Freiburg	July 2026	
2	(Belgium) Amadou Onana	£50m	(England) Everton	July 2024	
3	(Senegal) Nicolas Jackson	£47.5m (rising to £65m)	(England) Chelsea	August 2026	
4	(Senegal) Ibrahim Mbaye	£47m	(France) Paris Saint-Germain	September 2026	
5	(Netherlands) Ian Maatsen	£37.5m	(England) Chelsea	June 2024	
6	(France) Moussa Diaby	£34.2m (rising to £51.9m)	(Germany) Bayer Leverkusen	July 2023	
7	(Brazil) João Gomes	£34m (rising to £38m)	(England) Wolverhampton Wanderers	July 2026	
8	(Argentina) Emiliano Buendía	£33m (rising to £38m)	(England) Norwich City	June 2021	
9	(Spain) Pau Torres	£31.5m	(Spain) Villarreal	July 2023	
10	(Jamaica) Leon Bailey	£30m	(Germany) Bayer Leverkusen	August 2021	

Fees Received

Rank	Player	Fee	To	Date	Ref.
1	(England) Morgan Rogers	£117m	(England) Chelsea	July 2026	
2	(England) Jack Grealish	£100m	(England) Manchester City	August 2021	
3	(Colombia) Jhon Durán	£71m	(Saudi Arabia) Al Nassr	January 2025	
4	(England) Ezri Konsa	£51m (rising to £55m)	(England) Arsenal	August 2026	
4	(England) Ollie Watkins	£51m	(Saudi Arabia) Al Hilal	August 2026	
6	(France) Moussa Diaby	£50.5m	(Saudi Arabia) Al-Ittihad	July 2024	
7	(Brazil) Douglas Luiz	£42.4m	(Italy) Juventus	June 2024	
8	(England) Jacob Ramsey	£39m (rising to £44m)	(England) Newcastle United	August 2025	
9	(Belgium) Youri Tielemans	£35m	(England) Manchester United	July 2026	
10	(Belgium) Christian Benteke	£32.5m	(England) Liverpool	July 2015	

Historical

- Jimmy Crabtree 1895 £250
- Andy Ducat 1913 £1,000
- Jimmy Allen 1934 £10,500
- Mike Ferguson 1968 £55,000
- Bruce Rioch 1969 £100,000
- Ken McNaught 1977 £200,000
- David Geddis 1979 £300,000
- Peter Withe 1980 £500,000
- Tony Cascarino 1990 £1.5m
- Dean Saunders 1992 £2.3m
- Savo Milošević 1995 £3.5m
- Saša Ćurčić 1996 £4m
- Stan Collymore 1997 £7m
- Juan Pablo Ángel 2001 £9.5m
- Ashley Young 2007 £9.5m
- Darren Bent 2011 £18m
- Wesley Moraes 2019 £22m
- Ollie Watkins 2020 £28m (rising to £33m)

=== Terrace Trophy ===
- 1957-58 Nigel Sims
- 1961-62 Charlie Aitken
- 1962-63 Vic Crowe
- 1964-65 Ron Wylie
- 1965-66 Colin Withers
- 1966-67 Colin Withers
- 1968-69 Barrie Hole
- 1972-73 Jimmy Brown
- 1973-74 John Gidman
- 2007-08 Martin Laursen
- 2010–11 Marc Albrighton & Ciaran Clark (Shared)
- 2011-12 Steven Ireland
- 2014-15 Fabian Delph
- 2020-21 Emiliano Martinez
- 2021-22 Matty Cash
- 2022-23 Douglas Luiz
- 2023-24 Ollie Watkins
- 2024-25 Youri Tielemans

== Managerial records ==
- First manager/secretary of the club: George Ramsay, in charge of 1327 games from August 1884 to 5 May 1926.
- Longest serving manager: George Ramsay.
- Most successful manager: George Ramsay, 6 League Championships and 6 FA Cups.

== Club records ==
=== Goals ===
- Most league goals scored in a season: 128 (in 42 matches in the 1930–31 season, Division One).
- Fewest league goals scored in a season: 27 goals (in 38 matches in the 2015–16 season, Premier League).
- Most league goals conceded in a season: 110 goals (in 42 matches in the 1935–36 season, Division One).
- Fewest league goals conceded in a season: 32 goals (in 46 matches in the 1971–72 season, Division Three).

=== Points ===
- Most points in a season:
  - Two points for a win: 70 points (in 46 matches in the 1971–72 season, Division Three).
  - Three points for a win: 83 points (in 46 matches in the 2017–18 season, Championship).
- Fewest points in a season:
  - Two points for a win:
    - 18 points (in 22 matches in the 1890–91 season, Division One).
    - 29 points (in 42 matches in the 1966–67 season, Division One / 1969–70 season, Division Two).
  - Three points for a win:
    - 17 points (in 38 matches in the 2015–16, Premier League).

=== Matches ===
==== Firsts ====
- First match: Aston Villa 1–0 Aston Brook St Mary's, March 1874.
- First league match: Wolverhampton Wanderers 1–1 Aston Villa, 8 September 1888.
- First match at Villa Park: friendly; 3–0, Blackburn Rovers, on 17 April 1897.
- First FA Cup match: Stafford Road Works 1–1 Aston Villa, 13 December 1879. Aston Villa won the replay 3–1 on 24 January 1880.
- First League Cup match: Aston Villa 4–1 Huddersfield Town, 12 October 1960.
- First European match: Royal Antwerp 4–1 Aston Villa, 17 September 1975, UEFA Cup.

==== Record wins ====
- Record Football League win: 12–2 (v. Accrington, 12 March 1892).
- Record Premier League win: 7–1 (v. Wimbledon, 11 February 1995).
- Record FA Cup win: 13–0 (v. Wednesbury Old Athletic, 1st round, 3 October 1886).
- Record League Cup win: 8–1 (v. Exeter City, 2nd round, 9 October 1985).
- Record European win: 6–0 (v. Fenerbahçe in the UEFA Champions League, 14 October 2026).

==== Record defeats ====
- Record defeat: 0–8 (v. Chelsea, Premier League, 23 December 2012).
- Record FA Cup defeat: 1–8 (v. Blackburn Rovers, 3rd round, 16 February 1889).
- Record League Cup defeat: 1–6 (v. West Bromwich Albion, 2nd round, 14 September 1966).
- Record European defeat: 1–4 (v. Royal Antwerp, 1st round UEFA Cup, on 17 September 1975).

=== Attendances ===
- Highest attendance at Villa Park:
  - League game: 69,492 (v. Wolverhampton Wanderers, 27 December 1949).
  - FA Cup game: 76,588 (v. Derby County, sixth round, 2 March 1946).
  - As an all-seater stadium: 43,157 (v. Manchester United, 21 December 2025).
- Lowest attendance at Villa Park:
  - League game: 2,900 (v. Bradford City, Division One, 13 February 1915).
- Highest attendance at Wellington Road:
  - League game: 20,000 (v. Sunderland, 5 October 1895; v. Everton, 26 September 1896).
  - FA Cup game: 26,849 (v. Preston North End, fifth round, 7 January 1888).
- Lowest attendance at Wellington Road
  - League game: 600 (v. Accrington, 27 October 1888).

=== Streaks ===
- Longest winning runs (consecutive wins):
  - Multiple competitions:
    - 11 games in the 1896–97 Football League, 1897–98 Football League and 1896–97 FA Cup (20 March 1897 – 18 September 1897)
    - 11 games in the 1913–14 Football League and 1913–14 FA Cup (10 January 1914 – 15 March 1914)
    - 11 games in the 2025–26 Premier League and 2025–26 UEFA Europa League (6 November 2025 – 27 December 2025)
  - League:
    - 10 games in the 2018–19 EFL Championship (2 March 2019 – 22 April 2019)
- Longest unbeaten runs (without loss):
  - Multiple competitions:
    - 22 games in the 1896–97 Football League, 1897–98 Football League, and 1896–97 FA Cup (16 January 1897 – 18 September 1897)
  - League:
    - 13 games in the 1898–99 Football League (17 September 1898 – 24 December 1898)
    - 13 games in the 2008–09 Premier League (9 November 2008 – 7 February 2009)
- Longest losing run (consecutive losses):
  - 11 games in the 1962–63 Football League (23 March 1963 – 20 April 1963)
  - 11 games in the 2015–16 Premier League (14 February 2016 – 30 April 2016)
- Longest run without a win:
  - Multiple competitions:
    - 16 games in the 2015–16 Premier League, 2015–16 FA Cup and 2015–16 Football League Cup (22 September 2015 – 12 January 2016)
  - League
    - 19 games in the 2015–16 Premier League (14 August 2015 – 1 January 2016)

== National records ==
- Most League Cup matches played (252) and won (148)
- All-Time record for the most top-flight goals scored in a season, scoring 128 in season 1930–31.
- First football club in the world to appoint a paid manager, George Ramsay in 1886.
- First top-flight club to appoint a manager from outside the British Isles, Jozef Vengloš in July 1990.
- Villa Park was the first English stadium to stage international football in three different centuries.
- Villa Park has hosted more FA Cup Semi-Finals than any other ground, 55 to date.
- Highest FA Cup attendance (pre-World War I): 121,919 (Aston Villa vs Sunderland, Final at Crystal Palace, 19 April 1913)
- First football club to have a player score in every round of the FA Cup, when captain Archie Hunter led the club to its first FA Cup trophy in 1887.
- First football club to pay more than £100 for a player, for Willie Groves in 1893.
- First English football club to have a Black player on the scoresheet in the English Football League, when Willie Clarke scored on Christmas Day 1901, in a 3–2 victory over Everton.
- First English club to have a player score a hat-trick of penalty kicks in a league match, Billy Walker doing so in a 7–1 win against Bradford City in November 1921.
- First football club to have a player win both the PFA Young Player of the Year and PFA Players' Player of the Year in the same season, Andy Gray in 1976–77.

== Aston Villa in UEFA competitions ==
As of July 2023, Aston Villa are one of only six English clubs to have won the European Cup, doing so in 1982. Aston Villa's scores are noted first in both results columns.

=== List of matches ===
Season	Competition	Round	Country	Opponent	Home	Away	Agg.
1975–76	UEFA Cup	1R	Belgium	Antwerp	0–1	1–4	1–5
1977–78	UEFA Cup	1R	Turkey	Fenerbahçe	4–0	2–0	6–0
1977–78	UEFA Cup	2R	Poland	Górnik Zabrze	2–0	1–1	3–1
1977–78	UEFA Cup	3R	Spain	Athletic Bilbao	2–0	1–1	3–1
1977–78	UEFA Cup	QF	Spain	Barcelona	2–2	1–2	3–4
1981–82	European Cup (Winners)	1R	Iceland	Valur	5–0	2–0	7–0
1981–82	European Cup (Winners)	2R	East Germany	Dynamo Berlin	0–1	2–1	2–2 (a)
1981–82	European Cup (Winners)	QF	Soviet Union	Dynamo Kyiv	2–0	0–0	2–0
1981–82	European Cup (Winners)	SF	Belgium	Anderlecht	1–0	0–0	1–0
1981–82	European Cup (Winners)	F	West Germany	Bayern Munich	1–0		
1982–83	European Super Cup (Winners)	F	Spain	Barcelona	3–0	0–1	3–1
1982–83	Intercontinental Cup	F	Uruguay	Peñarol	0–2		
1982–83	European Cup	1R	Turkey	Beşiktaş	3–1	0–0	3–1
1982–83	European Cup	2R	Romania	Dinamo Bucharest	4–2	2–0	6–2
1982–83	European Cup	QF	Italy	Juventus	1–2	1–3	2–5
1983–84	UEFA Cup	1R	Portugal	Vitória de Guimarães	5–0	0–1	5–1
1983–84	UEFA Cup	2R	Soviet Union	Spartak Moscow	1–2	2–2	3–4
1990–91	UEFA Cup	1R	Czechoslovakia	Baník Ostrava	3–1	2–1	5–2
1990–91	UEFA Cup	2R	Italy	Inter Milan	2–0	0–3	2–3
1993–94	UEFA Cup	1R	Slovakia	Slovan Bratislava	2–1	0–0	2–1
1993–94	UEFA Cup	2R	Spain	Deportivo La Coruña	0–1	1–1	1–2
1994–95	UEFA Cup	1R	Italy	Inter Milan	1–0 (a.e.t.)	0–1	1–1 (4–3 p)
1994–95	UEFA Cup	2R	Turkey	Trabzonspor	2–1	0–1	2–2 (a)
1996–97	UEFA Cup	1R	Sweden	Helsingborg	1–1	0–0	1–1 (a)
1997–98	UEFA Cup	1R	France	Bordeaux	1–0	0–0	1–0
1997–98	UEFA Cup	2R	Spain	Athletic Bilbao	2–1	0–0	2–1
1997–98	UEFA Cup	3R	Romania	Steaua Bucharest	2–0	1–2	3–2
1997–98	UEFA Cup	QF	Spain	Atlético Madrid	2–1	0–1	2–2 (a)
1998–99	UEFA Cup	1R	Norway	Strømsgodset	3–2	3–0	6–2
1998–99	UEFA Cup	2R	Spain	Celta Vigo	1–3	1–0	2–3
2000–01	Intertoto Cup	3R	Czech Republic	Dukla Příbram	3–1	0–0	3–1
2000–01	Intertoto Cup	SF	Spain	Celta Vigo	1–2	0–1	1–3
2001–02	Intertoto Cup (Winners)	3R	Croatia	Slaven Belupo	2–0	1–2	3–2
2001–02	Intertoto Cup (Winners)	SF	France	Rennes	1–0	2–1	3–1
2001–02	Intertoto Cup (Winners)	F	Switzerland	Basel	4–1	1–1	5–2
2001–02	UEFA Cup	1R	Croatia	Varteks	2–3	1–0	3–3 (a)
2002–03	Intertoto Cup	3R	Switzerland	Zürich	3–0	0–2	3–2
2002–03	Intertoto Cup	SF	France	Lille	0–2	1–1	1–3
2008–09	Intertoto Cup (Co-winners)	3R	Denmark	Odense	1–0	2–2	3–2
2008–09	UEFA Cup	2QR	Iceland	FH	1–1	4–1	5–2
2008–09	UEFA Cup	1R	Bulgaria	Litex Lovech	1–1	3–1	4–2
2008–09	UEFA Cup	GS	Netherlands	Ajax	2–1	—N/a	—N/a
2008–09	UEFA Cup	GS	Czech Republic	Slavia Prague	—N/a	1–0	—N/a
2008–09	UEFA Cup	GS	Slovakia	Žilina	1–2	—N/a	—N/a
2008–09	UEFA Cup	GS	Germany	Hamburg	—N/a	1–3	—N/a
2008–09	UEFA Cup	R32	Russia	CSKA Moscow	1–1	0–2	1–3
2009–10	Europa League	P/O	Austria	Rapid Vienna	2–1	0–1	2–2 (a)
2010–11	Europa League	P/O	Austria	Rapid Vienna	2–3	1–1	3–4
2023–24	Europa Conference League	P/O	Scotland	Hibernian	3–0	5–0	8–0
2023–24	Europa Conference League	GS	Poland	Legia Warsaw	2–1	2–3	—N/a
2023–24	Europa Conference League	GS	Bosnia and Herzegovina	Zrinjski Mostar	1–0	1–1	—N/a
2023–24	Europa Conference League	GS	Netherlands	AZ Alkmaar	2–1	4–1	—N/a
2023–24	Europa Conference League	R16	Netherlands	Ajax	4–0	0–0	4–0
2023–24	Europa Conference League	QF	France	Lille	2–1	1–2 (a.e.t.)	3–3 (4–3 p)
2023–24	Europa Conference League	SF	Greece	Olympiacos	2–4	0–2	2–6
2024–25	Champions League	LP	Switzerland	Young Boys	—N/a	3–0	—N/a
2024–25	Champions League	LP	Germany	Bayern Munich	1–0	—N/a	—N/a
2024–25	Champions League	LP	Italy	Bologna	2–0	—N/a	—N/a
2024–25	Champions League	LP	Belgium	Club Brugge	—N/a	0–1	—N/a
2024–25	Champions League	LP	Italy	Juventus	0–0	—N/a	—N/a
2024–25	Champions League	LP	Germany	RB Leipzig	—N/a	3–2	—N/a
2024–25	Champions League	LP	France	Monaco	—N/a	0–1	—N/a
2024–25	Champions League	LP	Scotland	Celtic	4–2	—N/a	—N/a
2024–25	Champions League	R16	Belgium	Club Brugge	3–0	3–1	6–1
2024–25	Champions League	QF	France	Paris Saint-Germain	3–2	1–3	4–5
2025–26	Europa League (Winners)	LP	Italy	Bologna	1–0	—N/a	—N/a
2025–26	Europa League (Winners)	LP	Netherlands	Feyenoord	—N/a	2–0	—N/a
2025–26	Europa League (Winners)	LP	Netherlands	Go Ahead Eagles	—N/a	1–2	—N/a
2025–26	Europa League (Winners)	LP	Israel	Maccabi Tel Aviv	2–0	—N/a	—N/a
2025–26	Europa League (Winners)	LP	Switzerland	Young Boys	2–1	—N/a	—N/a
2025–26	Europa League (Winners)	LP	Switzerland	Basel	—N/a	2–1	—N/a
2025–26	Europa League (Winners)	LP	Turkey	Fenerbahçe	—N/a	1–0	—N/a
2025–26	Europa League (Winners)	LP	Austria	Red Bull Salzburg	3–2	—N/a	—N/a
2025–26	Europa League (Winners)	R16	France	Lille	2–0	1–0	3–0
2025–26	Europa League (Winners)	QF	Italy	Bologna	4–0	3–1	7–1
2025–26	Europa League (Winners)	SF	England	Nottingham Forest	4–0	0–1	4–1
2025–26	Europa League (Winners)	F	Germany	SC Freiburg	3–0		
2026–27	UEFA Super Cup	F	France	Paris Saint-Germain	1–2		
2026–27	Champions League	LP	Belgium	Club Brugge	—N/a	3–2	—N/a
2026–27	Champions League	LP	Turkey	Fenerbahçe	6–0	—N/a	—N/a
2026–27	Champions League	LP	Norway	Viking	3–1	—N/a	—N/a
2026–27	Champions League	LP	Spain	Barcelona	—N/a	0–3	—N/a
2026–27	Champions League	LP	Turkey	Galatasaray	—N/a		—N/a
2026–27	Champions League	LP	France	Paris Saint-Germain		—N/a	—N/a
2026–27	Champions League	LP	Germany	Borussia Dortmund		—N/a	—N/a
2026–27	Champions League	LP	Czech Republic	Slavia Prague	—N/a		—N/a

Key

- 2QR = Second qualifying round
- P/O = Play-off round
- 1R = First round
- 2R = Second round
- 3R = Third round
- GS = Group stage
- LP = League phase
- R32 = Round of 32
- R16 = Round of 16
- QF = Quarter-finals
- SF = Semi-finals
- F = Final

=== Record by competition ===
Competition	Record							
Competition	Pld	W	D	L	GF	GA	GD	Win %
European Cup/UEFA Champions League	31	20	4	7	59	28	+31	64.52
UEFA Cup/UEFA Europa League	71	37	14	20	110	67	+43	52.11
UEFA Europa Conference League	14	8	2	4	29	16	+13	57.14
UEFA Intertoto Cup	16	6	4	6	21	17	+4	37.50
UEFA Super Cup	3	1	0	2	4	3	+1	33.33
Intercontinental Cup	1	0	0	1	0	2	−2	0.00
Total	136	72	24	40	223	133	+90	52.94

Last updated: 3 November 2026
Source: UEFA.com

== Footnotes ==
A. The Premier League took over from the First Division as the top tier of the English football league system upon its formation in 1992. The First Division then became the second tier of English football, the Second Division became the third tier, and so on. The First Division is now known as the Football League Championship, while the Second Division is now known as Football League One.
B In 1981, the Charity Shield was shared in the event of a draw.
C Aston Villa won their 3rd round, final tie of the 2008 Intertoto Cup and were named a co-winner of the tournament, as a result they qualified for the 2008-09 UEFA Cup. The outright winner of the Intertoto Cup was the team that progressed furthest in the UEFA Cup that season, which was SC Braga.
D The home team are listed first.
