= 1897–98 Aston Villa F.C. season =

English football club season

Aston Villa
1897–98 season
- Manager: George Ramsay
- Ground: Wellington Road
- Football League: 6th
- FA Cup: First round
- Top goalscorer: Fred Wheldon (21)

First Division
- Champions: Sheffield United (1st English title)
- Top goalscorer: Fred Wheldon, 21 goals
- Highest attendance: 50,000 (15 January 1898); Aston Villa 1–2 Sheffield United
- Lowest attendance: 1,000 (13 November 1897); West Brom 2–1 Liverpool

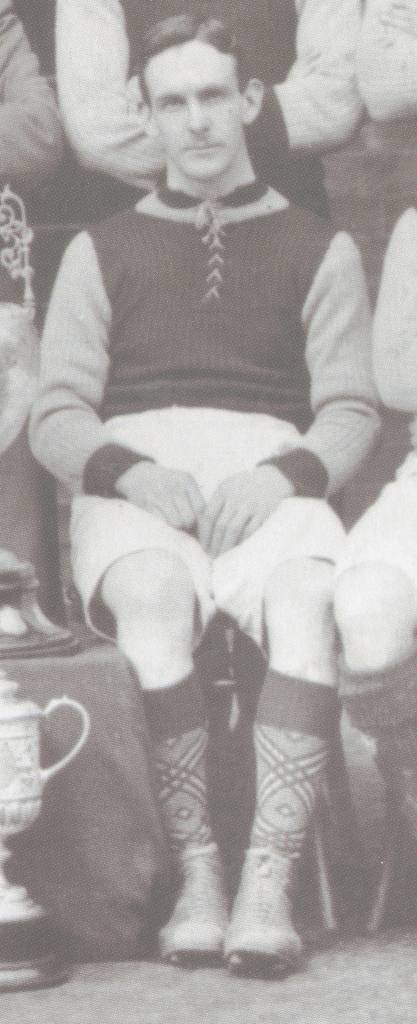
Fred Wheldon, League top scorer, pictured in 1897

The 1897–98 English football season was Aston Villa's 10th season in the Football League. Villa, the reigning champions, played in the First Division, the top flight of English football. The season fell in what was to be called Villa's golden era.

First-class cricketer and England football international Jack Devey was Captain. Jimmy Crabtree also captained the team. "Diamond" Freddie Wheldon was League top scorer with 21. Billy Garraty, great-great grandfather of future-player Jack Grealish, made his league debut for Aston Villa during the season but made just one other appearance that year. Other debuts were James Fisher, Jack Sharp, Bert Sharp, Billy George, Howard Harvey, Jimmy Suddick, Tommy Bowman, Edmund Strange, George Johnson and Charlie Aston.

George Ramsay would continue in charge of the team picked by the Management Committee.

== First Division ==
Pos	Team	Pld	W	D	L	GF	GA	GAv	Pts
4	Everton	30	13	9	8	48	39	1.231	35
5	The Wednesday	30	15	3	12	51	42	1.214	33
6	Aston Villa	30	14	5	11	61	51	1.196	33
7	West Bromwich Albion	30	11	10	9	44	45	0.978	32
8	Nottingham Forest	30	11	9	10	47	49	0.959	31

Source: World Football
Rules for classification: 1) Points; 2) Goal average; 3) Goals scored

1 September 1897 Match 1	Aston Villa	5–2	Sheffield Wednesday	Wellington Road
	Jack Cowan; Fred Wheldon (3); Charlie Athersmith	Report
Note: 🟩

4 September 1897 Match 2	Aston Villa	4–3	West Bromwich Albion	Wellington Road
	Fred Wheldon (3); James Fisher	Report
Note: 🟩

11 September 1897 Match 3	Notts County	2–3	Aston Villa	Trent Bridge
		Report	Jimmy Cowan (2); Jack Devey
Note: 🟩

18 September 1897 Match 4	Aston Villa	3–1	Bury	Wellington Road
	James Fisher (2); Fred Wheldon	Report
Note: 🟩

25 September 1897 Match 5	Blackburn Rovers	4–3	Aston Villa	Ewood Park
		Report	Jack Cowan; Fred Wheldon (2)
Note: 🟥

27 September 1897 Match 6	Sheffield Wednesday	3–0	Aston Villa	Olive Grove
		Report
Note: 🟥

2 October 1897 Match 7	Aston Villa	3–2	Bolton Wanderers	Wellington Road
	Jack Sharp (2); Fred Wheldon	Report
Note: 🟩

9 October 1897 Match 8	West Bromwich Albion	1–1	Aston Villa	Stoney Lane
		Report	Jack Sharp
Note: 🟨

16 October 1897 Match 9	Aston Villa	4–2	Notts County	Wellington Road
	Jack Devey; Jack Sharp (2); Fred Wheldon	Report
Note: 🟩

23 October 1897 Match 10	Sunderland	0–0	Aston Villa	Newcastle Road
		Report
Note: 🟨

30 October 1897 Match 11	Aston Villa	3–1	Liverpool	Wellington Road
	Fred Wheldon; Charlie Athersmith; Jack Devey	Report
Note: 🟩

6 November 1897 Match 12	Preston North End	3–1	Aston Villa	Deepdale
		Report	Charlie Athersmith
Note: 🟥

13 November 1897 Match 13	Aston Villa	3–0	Everton	Wellington Road
	Fred Wheldon (2); Jack Sharp	Report
Note: 🟩

20 November 1897 Match 14	Bolton Wanderers	2–0	Aston Villa	Pike's Lane
		Report
Note: 🟥

27 November 1897 Match 15	Aston Villa	4–3	Sunderland	Wellington Road
	Howard Harvey (2); Fred Wheldon (2)	Report
Note: 🟩

11 December 1897 Match 16	Aston Villa	5–1	Blackburn Rovers	Wellington Road
	Jimmy Crabtree; Fred Wheldon; Charlie Athersmith; Jimmy Cowan; Jack Cowan	Report
Note: 🟩

18 December 1897 Match 17	Stoke	0–0	Aston Villa	Victoria Ground
		Report
Note: 🟨

25 December 1897 Match 18	Everton	2–1	Aston Villa	Goodison Park
		Report	Fred Wheldon
Note: 🟥 Aston Villa's Christmas fixture was away at Everton kicking off at 11:00 am. Wheldon, kit man Joe Grierson and Jimmy and John Cowan were travelling to the station when their coach and horse overturned. Playing a crucial game short of players and without kit was not an option but missing a match would incur a fine of £250 (roughly £40,000 in 2026). By the time they arrived, their 8:50 am train had departed leaving Vice-President Charlie Johnstone and the rest of the team on the platform. The only option was to take a train to Stafford where they told a special would take them onwards to Liverpool. However once at Stafford, they found there was no train arranged. Johnstone took control and was able to bribe their train's driver, stoker and guard with seats in the director's box, dinner and half a sovereign each if they would continue the train to Liverpool. The game kicked off ten minutes late. Johnstone was unable to guarantee a victory.

27 December 1897 Match 19	Wolverhampton Wanderers	1–1	Aston Villa	Molineux
		Report	Charlie Athersmith
Note: 🟨

8 January 1898 Match 20	Sheffield United	1–0	Aston Villa	Bramall Lane
		Report
Note: 🟥

15 January 1898 Match 21	Aston Villa	1–2	Sheffield United	Wellington Road
	Fred Wheldon	Report
Note: 🟥

22 January 1898 Match 22	Derby County	3–1	Aston Villa	Baseball Ground
		Report	Bert Sharp
Note: 🟥

5 February 1898 Match 23	Aston Villa	4–0	Preston North End	Wellington Road
	Jimmy Suddick; Fred Wheldon; Charlie Athersmith; Jack Sharp	Report
Note: 🟩

5 March 1898 Match 24	Aston Villa	4–1	Derby County	Wellington Road
	Steve Smith; James Fisher; Jack Sharp; Unknown	Report
Note: 🟩

12 March 1898 Match 25	Bury	1–2	Aston Villa	Gigg Lane
		Report	Jack Sharp; Fred Wheldon
Note: 🟩

26 March 1898 Match 26	Nottingham Forest	3–1	Aston Villa	Town Ground
		Report	James Fisher
Note: 🟥

2 April 1898 Match 27	Aston Villa	1–1	Stoke	Wellington Road
	Jack Sharp	Report
Note: 🟨

11 April 1898 Match 28	Aston Villa	1–2	Wolverhampton Wanderers	Wellington Road
	Fred Wheldon	Report
Note: 🟥

16 April 1898 Match 29	Liverpool	4–0	Aston Villa	Anfield
		Report
Note: 🟥

30 April 1898 Match 30	Aston Villa	2–0	Nottingham Forest	Wellington Road
	Steve Smith; George Johnson	Report
Note: 🟩

== FA Cup ==
The first round proper contained sixteen ties between 32 teams. The matches were played on Saturday, 29 January 1898. One match was drawn, with the replay taking place in the following midweek fixture.

Tie no	Home team	Score	Away team	Date
11	Derby County	1–0	Aston Villa	29 January 1898

== Staffordshire Cup ==
Matches played by Aston Villa included a 6–1 victory over West Bromwich Albion.
