= Charlie Athersmith =

English footballer

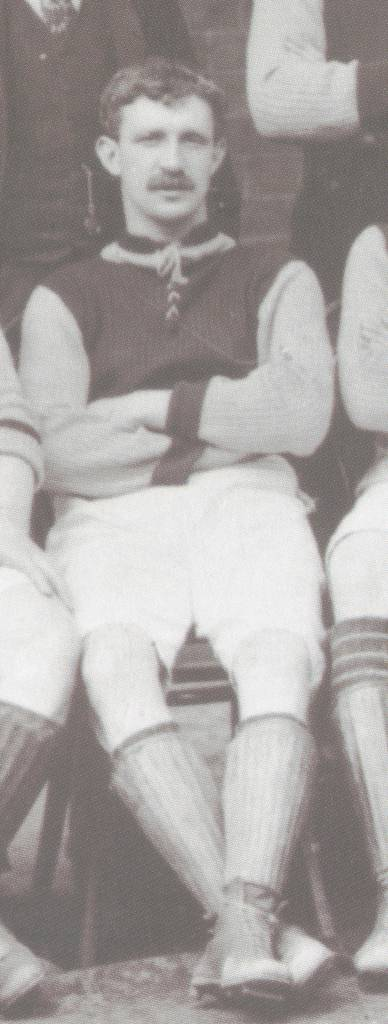
- Charlie Athersmith pictured in Aston Villa colours in 1897

Personal information
- Full name: William Charles Athersmith Harper
- Date of birth: 10 May 1872
- Place of birth: Bloxwich, England
- Date of death: 18 September 1910 (aged 38)
- Place of death: Shifnal, England
- Position: Outside right

Youth career
- Bloxwich Wanderers
- Bloxwich Strollers
- Unity Gas
1891–1901	Aston Villa	269	(75)
1901–1905	Small Heath	100	(12)

International career
Years	Team	Apps	(Gls)
1892–1900	England	12	(3)

William Charles Athersmith Harper (10 May 1872 – 18 September 1910), known as Charlie Athersmith, was an English professional footballer who played as a winger. He played the majority of his club career at Aston Villa, making 307 appearances and scoring 85 goals, and also made 106 appearances for Small Heath. He was capped 12 times for England.

The earliest cigarette association football cards from a known set are Billy Bassett and Athersmith from Godfrey and Phillips “General Interest” in 1896.

== Personal life ==
Athersmith was born William Charles Athersmith Harper in Bloxwich, Staffordshire, to Isaac Harper and Mary Jane Wootton. Before becoming a professional footballer he was a clerk in Birmingham where he married Elizabeth Baggott in 1893. He is a first cousin of Rotherham United and Liverpool player Vic Wright. He died in Shifnal, Shropshire at the age of 38. His death was drink related.

== Playing career ==
=== Aston Villa ===
Athersmith played a key role in Villa's title-winning sides of 1894, 1896, 1897, 1899 and 1900 as well as reaching three FA Cup finals, finishing on the losing side in 1892 before gaining winners' medals in 1895 and the Double-winning final of the 1896–97 season. He was also a member of the team that were victims of a giant-killing in the 1899–1900 FA Cup at the hands of Millwall Athletic.

A league match in November 1894 against Sheffield United at Perry Barr was played in driving freezing rain. Villa's players had dry clothes available, and were given hot drinks, a courtesy apparently not extended to the visitors. The Sheffield players were worse affected, several – including goalkeeper Willie Foulke – needing treatment for exposure, and by the end of the match only six were still on the field. Villa's Jack Devey put on an overcoat, and Athersmith played under an umbrella borrowed from a spectator before collapsing in the dressing-room afterwards. Claims that Athersmith scored a goal from beneath the umbrella appear to be apocryphal.

=== Small Heath ===
In 1901 he joined Small Heath for £150, where he made 106 appearances and scored 13 goals.

=== Representative football ===
Athersmith represented England at outside right on 12 occasions and scored three goals, each of which came against Ireland. He also scored four goals from 9 appearances for the Football League XI.
