= James Elliott =

James or Jim Elliot(t) may refer to:

- James Elliott (actor) (1928–2011), British-born, Australia based actor and tipstaff
- Jumbo Elliott (coach) (1915–1981), nickname of James Elliott, athletics coach
- Jumbo Elliott (baseball) (1900–1970), professional baseball player
- James Elliot (politician) (1775–1839), Vermont congressman
- James Elliott (footballer), English footballer
- James Elliott, Jr., founder of Phi Gamma Delta fraternity in 1848
- James Douglas Elliott (1859–1933), U.S. federal judge
- James L. Elliot (1943–2011), American astronomer and scientist
- Sir James Elliott (medical administrator) (1880–1959), New Zealand doctor, editor, medical administrator and writer
- James T. Elliott (1823–1875), U.S. Representative from Arkansas
- James William Elliott (1833–1915), English collector of nursery rhymes
- Jim Eliot, English musician and member of the band Kish Mauve
- Jim Elliot (1927–1956), Christian missionary to Ecuador
- Jim Elliott (born 1942), American politician
- Jimmy Elliott (1838–1883), Irish-American boxer
- Jimmy Elliott (footballer) (1891–?), English footballer and manager
- James Dudley Elliott, Australian judge
- James Philip Elliott (1929–2008), British theoretical nuclear physicist
- James Elliott (curler), Scottish wheelchair curler
- Jim Eliot, English musician

== See also ==
- Jamie Elliott (disambiguation)
