= 1930–31 Aston Villa F.C. season =

English football club season

Aston Villa
1930–31 season
- President: Patrick Hannon
- Manager: Billy Smith
- Stadium: Villa Park
- First Division: 2nd
- FA Cup: Third round

Second City Derby
- 18—10—11

The 1930–31 English football season was Aston Villa's 39th season in The Football League, Villa playing in the First Division. Villa scored 128 league goals in 42 matches, a First Division record. Villa's Pongo Waring finished as the leagues top scorer with 49 goals, overshadowing Eric Houghton who scored 30 goals. As of 2023, this remains the Villa record season for goals scored.

Villa started the season with four successive league wins, a record not matched until the 2020–21 season. On 17 January 1931 Villa beat Bolton 3–1. They would go on to win their eight remaining home games and thus had nine consecutive home wins to end the season. Other notable statistics included inflicting a 7–0 victory over Manchester United, the joint-heaviest competitive defeat for that club In the Second City derby, following a 1–1 home draw, Villa beat Birmingham 4–0 at St Andrews with goals by Joe Beresford, Eric Houghton, Jack Mandley and Joe Tate.

There were debuts for Tommy Wood (71), Reg Miles (16) and Percy Maggs (14). After a trial with Villa in October 1930, goalkeeper, Harry Morton (192) was signed as an amateur and made his club debut for the reserves in a Central League game against Everton Reserves on 22 November 1930. He went on to sign as a professional in March 1931. Richard York (356) played just four times in the 1930–31 campaign.

== League table ==
Pos	Team	Pld	W	D	L	GF	GA	GAv	Pts
1	Arsenal (C)	42	28	10	4	127	59	2.153	66
2	Aston Villa	42	25	9	8	128	78	1.641	59
3	Sheffield Wednesday	42	22	8	12	102	75	1.360	52
4	Portsmouth	42	18	13	11	84	67	1.254	49
5	Huddersfield Town	42	18	12	12	81	65	1.246	48

Source: World Football
Rules for classification: 1) Points; 2) Goal average; 3) Goals scored
(C) Champions

=== Matches ===
30 August 1930	Manchester United	3–4	Aston Villa	Old Trafford
		Report	Pongo Waring 27', 47', 48', 89'

1 September 1930	Sheffield Wednesday	0–2	Aston Villa	Hillsborough Stadium
			Pongo Waring 57'; George Brown 63'

6 September 1930	Aston Villa	6–1	West Ham United	Villa Park
	Eric Houghton 8'; Billy Walker 2–0; Pongo Waring 27', 53', 66'; 6–1

9 September 1930	Grimsby Town	1–2	Aston Villa	Blundell Park
			Pongo Waring 24'; Eric Houghton 29'

13 September 1930	Bolton Wanderers	1–1	Aston Villa	Burnden Park
			Pongo Waring 81'

15 September 1930	Aston Villa	2–0	Grimsby Town	Villa Park
	Eric Houghton 22'; Pongo Waring 43'

20 September 1930	Aston Villa	4–2	Liverpool	Villa Park
	Eric Houghton 27'; George Brown 37'; Billy Walker 44'; Pongo Waring 83'

27 September 1930	Middlesbrough	3–1	Aston Villa	Ayresome Park
			Joe Beresford 17'

4 October 1930	Aston Villa	6–1	Huddersfield Town	Villa Park
	Eric Houghton 1–0, 66'; Billy Walker 10', 62', 63'; Pongo Waring 48'

11 October 1930	Sunderland	1–1	Aston Villa	Roker Park
			Eric Houghton 42'

18 October 1930	Aston Villa	1–1	Birmingham City	Villa Park
	Pongo Waring 35'

25 October 1930	Leicester City	4–1	Aston Villa	Filbert Street
			Pongo Waring 67'

1 November 1930	Aston Villa	5–2	Blackburn Rovers	Villa Park
	Pongo Waring 1–0, 4–1; Joe Beresford 27'; Eric Houghton 16', 83'

8 November 1930	Arsenal	5–2	Aston Villa	Highbury
			Pongo Waring 42'; 2–4
Note: Aston Villa lost 5–2 at Arsenal Stadium in front of a crowd of 56,417.

15 November 1930	Aston Villa	4–6	Derby County	Villa Park
	Eric Houghton 9' (pen), 55'; Alec Talbot 41'; Pongo Waring 74'

22 November 1930	Blackpool	2–2	Aston Villa	Bloomfield Road
			Reg Chester 25'; Jack Mandley 84'

3 December 1930	Aston Villa	2–2	Portsmouth	Villa Park
	Jimmy Gibson 1–0; Jack Mandley 2–0

6 December 1930	Sheffield United	3–4	Aston Villa	Bramall Lane
			Pongo Waring 6', 11'; Eric Houghton 3–1; Billy Walker 82'

13 December 1930	Aston Villa	4–3	Leeds United	Villa Park
	Jack Mandley 8'; Eric Houghton 30'; Pongo Waring 41'; Billy Walker 73'

20 December 1930	Manchester City	3–1	Aston Villa	Maine Road
			Pongo Waring 62'

25 December 1930	Chelsea	0–2	Aston Villa	Stamford Bridge
			Pongo Waring; Billy Walker

26 December 1930	Aston Villa	3–3	Chelsea	Villa Park
	Pongo Waring 1–1, 2–1; Eric Houghton 3–3 (pen)

27 December 1930	Aston Villa	7–0	Manchester United	Villa Park
	Jack Mandley 8', 66'; Eric Houghton 22' (pen), 28' (pen); George Brown 55', 69'; Joe Beresford 76'

1 January 1931	Newcastle United	2–0	Aston Villa	St James' Park

3 January 1931	West Ham United	5–5	Aston Villa	Boleyn Ground
			Joe Beresford 4', 61'; George Brown 40'; Billy Walker 30'; Eric Houghton 53' (pen)

17 January 1931	Aston Villa	3–1	Bolton Wanderers	Villa Park
	Eric Houghton 22'; Pongo Waring 52'; Jack Mandley 80'

24 January 1931	Liverpool	1–1	Aston Villa	Anfield
			Billy Walker 79'

31 January 1931	Aston Villa	8–1	Middlesbrough	Villa Park
	Joe Beresford 6'; Pongo Waring 25', 66'; Billy Walker 40'; Eric Houghton 42', 84'; Jack Mandley 72'

7 February 1931	Huddersfield Town	1–6	Aston Villa	Leeds Road
			Pongo Waring 16', 75'; Eric Houghton 48', 71'; Jimmy Gibson 85'; Joe Beresford 87'

18 February 1931	Aston Villa	4–2	Sunderland	Villa Park
	Pongo Waring 5', 13', 36'; 4–1

21 February 1931	Birmingham City	0–4	Aston Villa	St Andrew's
			Joe Tate 26'; Jack Mandley 58'; Eric Houghton 72'; Joe Beresford 80'

28 February 1931	Aston Villa	4–2	Leicester City	Villa Park
	Pongo Waring 31'; Joe Beresford 44', 81', 88'

7 March 1931	Blackburn Rovers	0–2	Aston Villa	Ewood Park
			Joe Beresford 24'; Pongo Waring 82'

14 March 1931	Aston Villa	5–1	Arsenal	Villa Park
	Pongo Waring 1', 37'; Billy Walker 44'; Eric Houghton 65', 80'
Note: Villa stopped Arsenal in their tracks with a 5–1 victory at Villa Park.

21 March 1931	Derby County	1–1	Aston Villa	Baseball Ground
			Eric Houghton 87'

28 March 1931	Aston Villa	4–1	Blackpool	Villa Park
	Pongo Waring 20', 81', 89'; Eric Houghton 2–0

4 April 1931	Portsmouth	5–0	Aston Villa	Fratton Park

7 April 1931	Aston Villa	4–3	Newcastle United	Villa Park
	Billy Walker 33', 40'; Eric Houghton 52' (pen); Pongo Waring 85'

11 April 1931	Aston Villa	4–0	Sheffield United	Villa Park
	Billy Walker 35'; Eric Houghton 48' (pen); Pongo Waring 80', 82'

18 April 1931	Leeds United	0–2	Aston Villa	Elland Road
			Pongo Waring 42'; Reg Chester 50'

25 April 1931	Aston Villa	4–2	Manchester City	Villa Park
	Reg Chester 2'; Joe Beresford 7'; Pongo Waring 53'; Eric Houghton 85'

2 May 1931	Sheffield Wednesday	3–0	Aston Villa	Hillsborough Stadium

Source: avfchistory.co.uk

== See also ==
- List of Aston Villa F.C. records and statistics
