= Joe Grierson =

English football trainer (1855–1937)

Joseph Grierson (6 February 1855 – 1 April 1937) was an English football trainer during Aston Villa F.C.'s 'Golden Era'.

== Life ==
Born in County Durham, Joe Grierson was a noted Middlesbrough athlete in his youth, winning the half mile handicap race three years in succession 1877, 1878 and 1879. He won the £25 prize in a 120-yard race in 1881. He became a trainer for the newly formed Middlesbrough Ironopolis F.C. in 1889.

The club won three consecutive titles in the Northern League from 1890 to 1893. During the 1892–93 season, the team reached the quarter-finals of the FA Cup before losing to Preston North End in a replay, after drawing the first game.

This success brought him to the attention of Midlands giants Aston Villa, who offered him a position as fitness trainer in 1893. At Aston Villa he became one of the most successful trainers of all time, working under George Ramsay. He remained at the club from 1893 until 1915, with former Villa captain John Devey as his assistant from 1901. During his time at the club he trained 6 League Championship and 4 FA Cup winning teams.

== Honours ==
Aston Villa

- First Division Champions (6): 1893–94, 1895–96, 1896–97, 1898–99, 1899–1900, 1909–10
  - Runners up (6): 1889, 1903, 1908, 1911, 1913, 1914
- FA Cup Winners (4): 1894–95, 1896–97, 1904–05, 1912–13,
  - Runners up (2): 1892,
- Sheriff of London Charity Shield (2): 1899 (shared), 1901
