= Jamie Elliott (disambiguation) =

Jamie Elliott (born 1992) is an Australian rules footballer for Collingwood.

Jamie Elliott may also refer to:

- Jamie Elliott (footballer, born 1973), Australian rules footballer
- Jamie Elliott (rugby union) (born 1992), English rugby union player

== See also ==
- James Elliott (disambiguation)
