= 1893–94 Aston Villa F.C. season =

English football club season

Aston Villa
1893–94 season
- Manager: George Ramsay
- Ground: Wellington Road
- First Division: Champions (1)
- FA Cup: Round 3

First Division
- Season: 1893–94
- Champions: Aston Villa (1/7, >> 1895–96)
- Relegated: Darwen; Newton Heath
- Matches: 240
- Goals: 939 (3.91 per match)
- Top goalscorer: Jack Southworth (27 goals)
- Biggest home win: Aston Villa 9–0 Darwen (26 December 1893)
- Biggest away win: Wolves 0–8 West Brom (27 December 1893)
- Highest scoring: Everton 8–1 Darwen (21 October 1893); West Brom 3–6 Aston Villa (21 October 1893); Everton 8–1 The Wednesday (23 December 1893); Aston Villa 9–0 Darwen (26 December 1893); Burnley 3–6 Aston Villa (7 April 1894)
- Longest winning run: 6 matches Aston Villa; Sheffield United; Sunderland
- Longest unbeaten run: 7 matches Nottingham Forest; Sheffield United; Wolverhampton Wanderers
- Longest losing run: 11 matches Newton Heath
- Highest attendance: 27,500; Everton 7–1 Sunderland (30 September 1893)
- Lowest attendance: 400; Derby County 2–1 Darwen (18 November 1893)
- Average attendance: 7,012

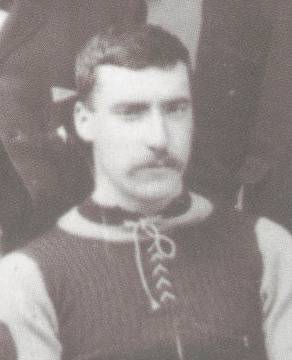
Jimmy Cowan

The 1893–94 English football season was Aston Villa's 6th season in the Football League since its formation. They finished the season as champions for the first time, and for the next few years they would be very much the dominant side of English football, winning a total of five championships and two FA Cups by 1900.

For the first two of these championship seasons, they were based at Wellington Road. Though reporters claimed gates of 20,000, it is not clear how many of these would have been able to see the game!

Villa built up a six-point lead by the end of December and maintained that margin to the end of the season, with only Sunderland providing a serious challenge.

Jack Devey was an all-round sportsman who enjoyed a long cricket career with Warwickshire. He played football for local clubs in Birmingham before joining Villa in 1891. He was capped twice by England.

Jimmy Cowan was an attacking centre-half in the days when this was a common tactic. He was well known as a sprinter and won the Powderhall Handicap in 1896. He was just 5 ft 6 1/2 in (1.69 m) tall, but his quoted weight of 12 st 3 lbs (77.6 kg) indicates a sprinter’s powerful build.

There were debut appearances for, Len Benwell, George Russell, Jack Reynolds, Jim Elliott, Jimmy Welford, James Gillan, Willie Groves, Steve Smith and Bill Randle.

== First Division ==
Aston Villa won the league title in the final match of the season 3-1 against Everton with goals from top scorer Guy Jones.

Pos	Team	Pld	W	D	L	GF	GA	GAv	Pts
1	Aston Villa (C)	30	19	6	5	84	42	2.000	44
2	Sunderland	30	17	4	9	72	44	1.636	38
3	Derby County	30	16	4	10	73	62	1.177	36
4	Blackburn Rovers	30	16	2	12	69	53	1.302	34
5	Burnley	30	15	4	11	61	51	1.196	34

Source: World Football
Rules for classification: 1) Points; 2) Goal average; 3) Goals scored
(C) Champions

=== Matches ===
Date	Opponent	Venue	Result	Notes	Scorers
2 Sep 1893	West Bromwich Albion	Wellington Road	3–2	—	Jack Reynolds (pen); Jack Devey; Albert Woolley
9 Sep 1893	Sunderland	Newcastle Road	1–1	—	Dennis Hodgetts
11 Sep 1893	Stoke	Wellington Road	5–1	—	Dennis Hodgetts (2); Jimmy Logan; Albert Woolley (2)
16 Sep 1893	Everton	Goodison Park	2–4	—	Albert Woolley; Charlie Athersmith
23 Sep 1893	Everton	Wellington Road	3–1	—	Albert Woolley (2); Charlie Athersmith
30 Sep 1893	Derby County	Wellington Road	1–1	—	Unknown
2 Oct 1893	Sheffield United	Bramall Lane	0–3	—	—
7 Oct 1893	Nottingham Forest	Town Ground	2–1	—	Jack Devey; Willie Groves
14 Oct 1893	Darwen	Anchor Ground	1–1	—	Jack Devey
16 Oct 1893	Stoke	Victoria Ground	3–3	—	Own goal; Charlie Athersmith (2)
21 Oct 1893	West Bromwich Albion	Stoney Lane	6–3	—	Jack Devey (2); Charlie Athersmith; Albert Woolley; Jimmy Cowan; Charlie Hare
28 Oct 1893	Burnley	Wellington Road	4–0	—	Charlie Hare; Jack Devey (2); Charlie Athersmith
30 Oct 1893	Sheffield United	Wellington Road	4–0	—	Charlie Hare (3); Jack Reynolds
4 Nov 1893	Blackburn Rovers	Ewood Park	0–2	—	—
11 Nov 1893	Sunderland	Wellington Road	2–1	—	Jack Devey; Jack Reynolds (pen)
18 Nov 1893	Bolton Wanderers	Pike's Lane	1–0	—	Jack Devey
25 Nov 1893	Preston North End	Wellington Road	2–0	—	Jack Devey; Charlie Hare
2 Dec 1893	Derby County	Baseball Ground	3–0	—	Dennis Hodgetts; Charlie Athersmith
9 Dec 1893	Sheffield Wednesday	Wellington Road	3–0	—	Own goal; Dennis Hodgetts; Charlie Athersmith
16 Dec 1893	Newton Heath	Bank Street	3–1	—	Own goal; Albert Brown
23 Dec 1893	Wolves	Molineux	0–3	—	—
26 Dec 1893	Darwen	Wellington Road	9–0	—	Charlie Athersmith (2); Dennis Hodgetts (3); Jack Reynolds; Jack Devey (2); Albert Brown
6 Jan 1894	Sheffield Wednesday	Olive Grove	2–2	—	Albert Brown; Dennis Hodgetts
18 Jan 1894	Preston North End	Deepdale	5–2	—	Jack Devey (2); Dennis Hodgetts; Jimmy Cowan
3 Feb 1894	Newton Heath	Wellington Road	5–1	—	Jack Devey (3); Dennis Hodgetts; Jack Reynolds
3 Mar 1894	Bolton Wanderers	Wellington Road	2–3	—	Bob Chatt (2)
24 Mar 1894	Blackburn Rovers	Wellington Road	2–1	—	Bob Chatt (2)
26 Mar 1894	Wolves	Wellington Road	1–1	—	Charlie Athersmith
7 Apr 1894	Burnley	Turf Moor	6–3	—	Willie Groves (2); Jack Devey (3); Dennis Hodgetts
14 Apr 1894	Nottingham Forest	Wellington Road	3–1	—	Charlie Athersmith; Bob Chatt; Jack Devey

Source: avfchistory.co.uk

Ever-present: Jimmy Cowan

== FA Cup ==
=== First round ===
Tie No.	Home team	Score	Away team	Date
6	Aston Villa	4–2	Wolverhampton Wanderers	27 January 1894

=== Second round ===
Tie No.	Home team	Score	Away team	Date
4	Sunderland	2–2	Aston Villa	10 February 1894
Replay	Aston Villa	3–1	Sunderland	21 February 1894

=== Third round ===
Tie No.	Home team	Score	Away team	Date
2	The Wednesday	3–2	Aston Villa	24 February 1894
