= Jimmy Crabtree =

English footballer (1871–1908)

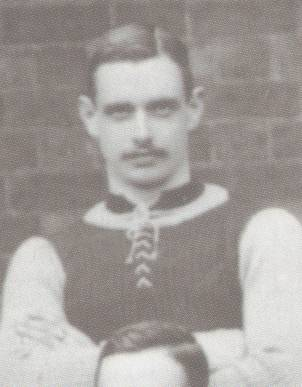

Personal information
- Full name: James William Crabtree
- Date of birth: 23 December 1871
- Place of birth: Burnley, England
- Date of death: 18 June 1908 (aged 36)
- Place of death: Birmingham, England
- Positions: Full back; half back

Senior career*
Years	Team	Apps	(Gls)
1889–1890	Burnley	3	(1)
1890–1891	Rossendale	?	(?)
1891–1892	Heywood Central	?	(?)
1892–1895	Burnley	69	(8)
1895–1904	Aston Villa	176	(6)
1904	Plymouth Argyle	4	(0)
Total		252	(15)

International career
1894–1902	England	14	(0)
- * Club domestic league appearances and goals

James William Crabtree (23 December 1871 – 18 June 1908) was a gifted English footballer of the end of the 19th century. Crabtree, alongside his great rival Ernest Needham, was described as the finest wing-half and the greatest player of all time by various teammates and journalists, including Sir Charles Clegg and Howard Spencer.

Crabtree is considered as one of the best footballers of the 19th century. Numerous footballers and experts named him as they best player they had ever seen at the time. He also remains one of the greatest Aston Villa legends.

== Career ==
Crabtree began his career at Burnley, but left in 1890 and played in non-league football for two years before returning to Burnley for the 1892–93 season.

Crabtree performances attracted the attention of FA Cup holders and, in 1895, became Aston Villa's record signing when he was purchased for £250. He played alongside Howard Spencer at left-half, and went on to share the captaincy of the club with him.

He won League Championship medals with Villa in 1897, 1899 and 1900, he also lifted the FA Cup in as a part of the Aston Villa team that completed the Double in 1897. He was capped 11 times by England whilst at Villa. Crabtree joined Plymouth Argyle in January 1904 and made four appearances in the Southern League before injury forced him to retire. He then coached at several non-league clubs and later became a pub licensee in Birmingham.

== Death ==
He died suddenly at the age of 36. His death was drink related.

== Honours ==
Aston Villa

- Football League champions: 1896–97, 1898–99, 1899–00
- FA Cup winner: 1897
