= Howard Spencer =

English footballer (1875–1940)

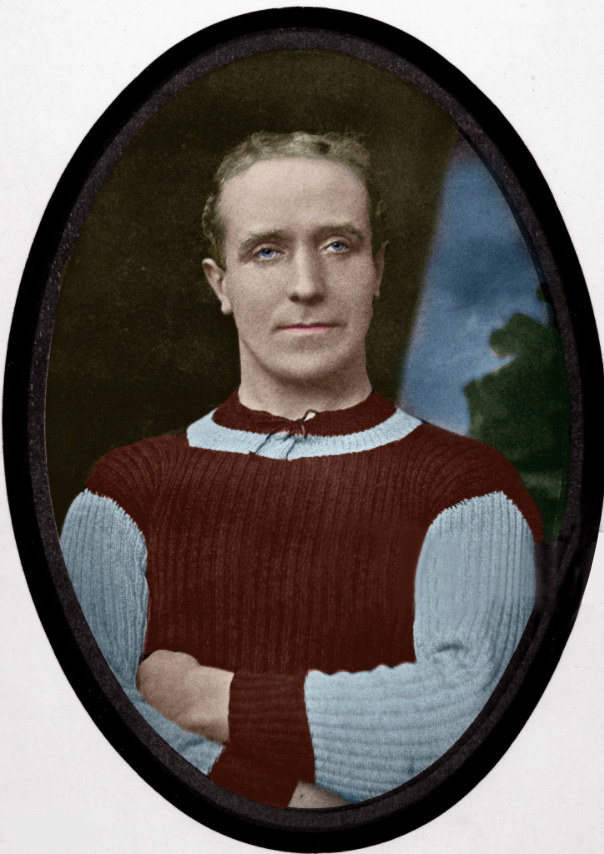
- The Prince of Fullbacks

Personal information
- Full name: Howard Spencer
- Date of birth: 23 August 1875
- Place of birth: Edgbaston, England
- Date of death: 14 January 1940 (aged 64)
- Place of death: Sutton Coldfield, England
- Height: 5 ft 10 1/2 in (1.79 m)
- Position: Defender

Senior career*
Years	Team	Apps	(Gls)
1892–1907	Aston Villa	258	(2)

International career
1897–1905	England	6	(0)
- * Club domestic league appearances and goals

Howard Spencer (23 August 1875 – 14 January 1940) was an English professional footballer. Often referred to as the "Prince of Fullbacks" due to his sportsmanship and ability, Spencer is considered one of the greatest Aston Villa captains of all time. In his 13 years as a senior player, he helped the side to four First Division championships and three FA Cup victories, as well as becoming the first Aston Villa player to captain England.

== Early life ==
Born in Edgbaston, Spencer was one of seven children and attended Albert Road School in nearby Aston. His father Josh was an oil merchant.

== Career ==
Spencer played local amateur football for a number of clubs in his local area before joining Football League First Division side Aston Villa from Birchfield Trinity in April 1892 as an amateur, turning professional two years later in June 1894. He made his debut for the club four months later on 13 October 1894 during a 3–1 victory over their West Midlands rivals West Bromwich Albion. At the end of his first season with the club, Spencer played in the 1895 FA Cup Final victory over West Brom at the age of 18 and, the following season, helped Villa to win the First Division title. This was followed by the league and FA cup Double winning season of 1896–97. Spencer was a key member of the Villa team that won back-to-back titles in 1898–99 and 1899–1900.

A one-club man, he spent 13 years with Villa, taking the 1901–02 season off in order to rest his knee and ankle for twelve months in the hope of recovering from an injury. It worked, Spencer went on to captain the Villa side that won the 1905 FA Cup.

Over the course of his career, Spencer gained a reputation as a fair player and was well known for his good sportsmanship which earned him the nickname the "Prince of Fullbacks". He announced his retirement from football at the end of the 1906–07 season but offered to play for the club in future if needed. This offer was taken up by Villa in November 1907 when Spencer played in three league matches, his final appearance for the club coming on 30 November 1907 against Newcastle United. During his time with the club, he made 294 appearances in all competitions, scoring 2 goals.

A sports reporter who watched Spencer play said this about him:

"He was the outstanding example of what Aston Villa tradition on the football field came to mean. I shall never forget the neat-looking, scrupulously clean-playing, solid, safe-looking, full-back, tacking crisply, confidently, side-tapping the ball into place for the long, low, raking, perfectly placed clearance."

— Roland Allen, All in the Day's Sport, 1946

Following his retirement, Spencer became a successful coal merchant and joined the Aston Villa's board of directors in 1909 and served as a director until 1936. He later also served as vice-president of the club, in all he was associated with the club for 42 years.

Spencer made his international debut for England on 29 March 1897 in a 4–0 victory over Wales. He retained his place in the team for their following fixture on 3 April 1897, a 2–1 defeat to Scotland, going on to win a total of six caps. He first captained England in a 4–0 victory over Ireland in February 1903, becoming the first Aston Villa player to captain England in the club's history. His final appearances for England came on 27 March and 1 April 1905 in victories over Wales and Scotland in which he also captained his side.

== Honours ==
Aston Villa Howard Spencer

- Football League First Division: 1895–96, 1896–97, 1898–99, 1899–1900
- FA Cup: 1894–95, 1896–97, 1904–05
