= James Cowan (footballer) =

Scottish footballer and manager

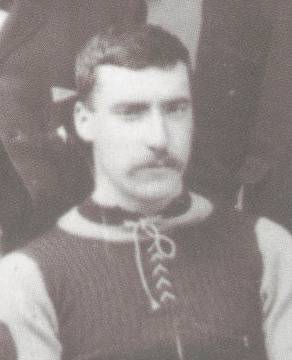
- Cowan with Aston Villa in 1897

Personal information
- Date of birth: 17 October 1868
- Place of birth: Jamestown, Dunbartonshire, Scotland
- Date of death: 12 December 1918 (aged 50)
- Place of death: London, England
- Position: Half back

Senior career*
Years	Team	Apps	(Gls)
- Renton
–1889	Vale of Leven		
1889–1890	Warwickshire County		
1890–1902	Aston Villa	315	(22)

International career
1896–1898	Scotland	3	(0)

Managerial career
- 1906–1913: Queens Park Rangers
- * Club domestic league appearances and goals

James Cowan (17 October 1868 – 12 December 1918) was a Scottish football player and manager, winning five Football League First Division titles and two FA Cup winners medals at Aston Villa and later taking charge of Queens Park Rangers. He was known as 'the Prince of Half-backs.'

== Playing career ==
=== Club ===
Born in Jamestown, Dunbartonshire, Cowan was a half-back who played with local sides Renton and Vale of Leven before moving to England in 1888 to play for the Warwickshire County FC. The following season, he wished to pursue a professional career and joined Aston Villa and spent 12 years with the Birmingham side.

When Cowan played for the club in the 1890s and early 1900s, they were the giants of the Football League. While at Villa, he won five First Division titles (in 1893–94, 1895–96, 1896–97, 1898–99 and 1899–1900) and two FA Cup winners medals (1895 and 1897, after being a beaten finalist in 1892) and played 354 times in all; he is considered to be one of the finest players of the Victorian era. For four years, his younger brother John also played for Aston Villa.

=== International ===
Cowan was selected for Scotland on three occasions, in 1896 being one of a group of five men who were the first to be selected while playing for an English club, in the process becoming Aston Villa's first international for that nation. Controversy dogged him after a disappointing performance in a defeat England in 1898, in which he was the Scottish captain; it emerged that he had not been fit to play through illness (possibly alcohol-related), and both the player and the selection committee were heavily criticised in the press for failing to replace him before the match began. He was not selected for international duties again.

== Managerial career ==
After retiring from playing in 1902, he coached the young players at Villa for a few years before deciding to accept the role of manager of Queens Park Rangers in 1907. QPR had just moved to a new ground designed By Archibald Leitch at Park Royal and Cowan was the club's first official manager. In his initial season he led them to the Southern League title and held Manchester United to a fine 1-1 draw in the Charity Shield.

Four years later he led QPR to another Southern League title. Off-the-field problems however prevented him from leading the club into the Football League. Prior to the start of the 1913–14 season he offered his resignation on the grounds of ill health which the directors accepted. He died at St Bartholomew's Hospital, London, in December 1918.

== Other sports ==
In 1890 Cowan played professional baseball for Aston Villa in the National League of Baseball of Great Britain.

He was renowned for his speed. On one occasion he missed a Villa match due to his attending (and winning) the illustrious 100 yard New Year Sprint event held at Powderhall. The club fined him but he still made a healthy profit due to the prize money.

== Managerial statistics ==
Nat.	Team	From	To	Record				
Nat.	Team	From	To	G	W	D	L	Win %
(England)	Queens Park Rangers	1 August 1906	31 March 1913	296	128	85	83	43.24
Total				296	128	85	83	43.24

== Honours ==
- First Division: 1893–94, 1895–96, 1896–97, 1898–99, 1899–1900
- FA Cup: 1895, 1897
- Baseball: 1890

== See also ==
- List of Scotland national football team captains
- List of Scottish football families
