= 1896–97 Aston Villa F.C. season =

English football club season

Aston Villa
1896–97 season
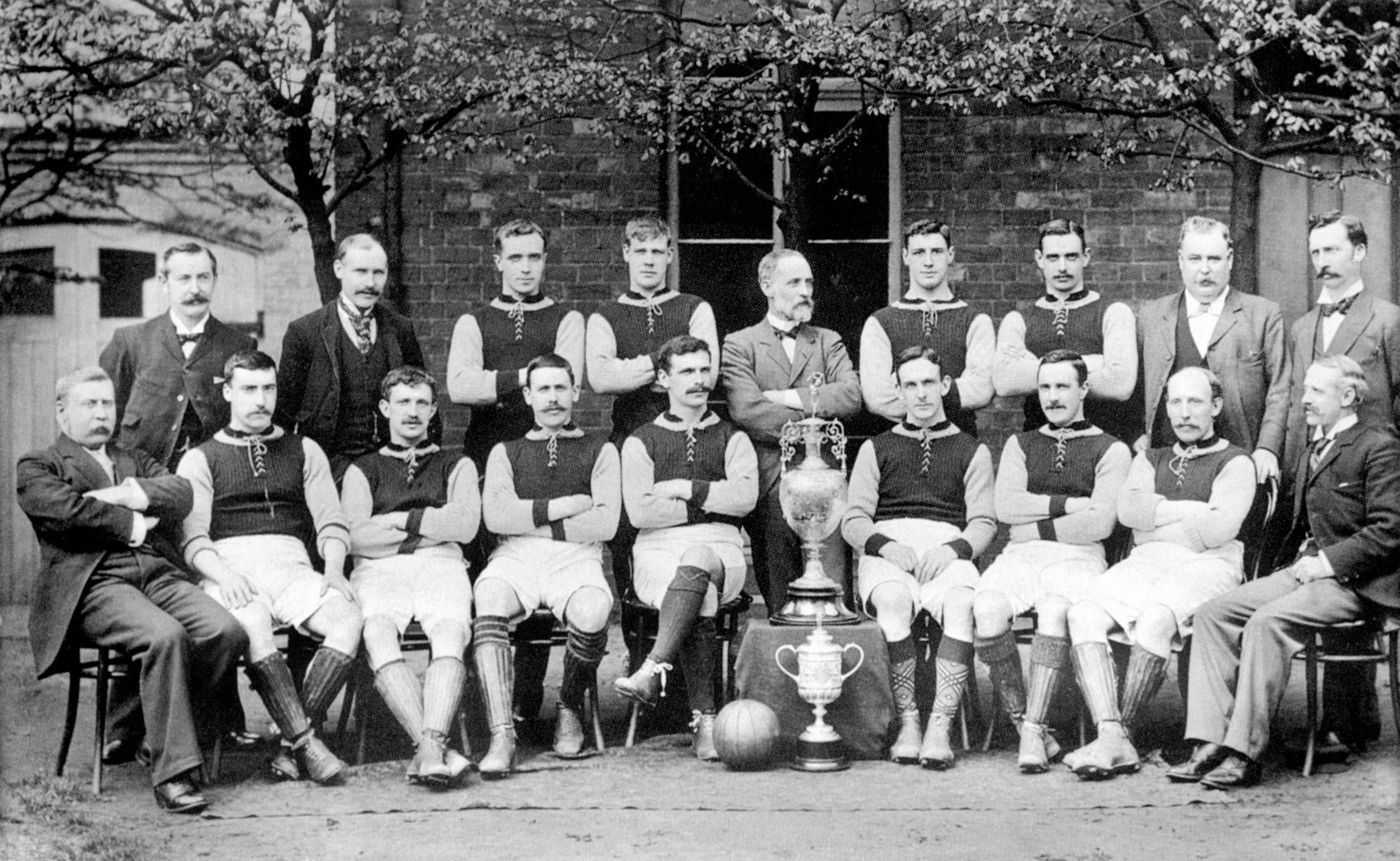
- President: Joseph Ansell
- Manager: George Ramsay
- Grounds: Wellington Road
- First Division: Champions (3)
- FA Cup: Winners
- Top goalscorer: League: Fred Wheldon (18); All: Fred Wheldon (22)

First Division
- Season: 1896–97
- Champions: Aston Villa; 3rd English title
- Relegated: Burnley
- Top goalscorer: Steve Bloomer (22 goals)
- Biggest home win: Derby County 8–1 West Brom (25 December 1896); Sheffield United 7–0 Blackburn (9 January 1897)
- Biggest away win: Blackburn 1–5 Aston Villa (28 November 1896)
- Highest scoring: Derby County 7–2 Bury (26 September 1896); Derby County 8–1 West Brom (25 December 1896); Everton 6–3 West Brom (17 April 1897)
- Longest winning run: 6 matches Everton
- Longest unbeaten run: 12 matches Aston Villa
- Longest losing run: 6 matches Everton
- Highest attendance: 40,000; Everton 2–1 Liverpool (3 October 1896)
- Lowest attendance: 1,000; Nottingham Forest 4–1 Burnley (24 October 1896); Sheffield United 7–0 Blackburn (9 January 1897)
- Average attendance: 7,734

The 1896-97 English football season was Aston Villa's 9th season in the Football League. Villa were champions for the third time matching Sunderland's three wins. For good measure, the FA Cup was also won, to make Villa the second team to complete "The Double" after Preston North End in 1888–89. It was the year of Queen Victoria's Diamond Jubilee and the Council had organised celebrations for 22 June 1897. The programme headlined "The Villa with the Cup". To the acclamation of the crowd, the players sat on two long benches, facing each self-consciously, as a horse-drawn wagonette proceeded through Aston with the FA Cup in the centre.

This was the season during which Villa moved from Wellington Road to their current home at Villa Park. With growing crowds, it became increasingly apparent that the existing ground was inadequate. Vice-President, Charlie Johnstone's invaluable foresight was pivotal in the acquisition of Villa Park. The land at the Wellington Road ground had initially been sub-let to the club for £5.00 a year but, as Villa became more successful, the rent kept rising and rising and the landlord would not grant a sufficiently long lease to justify the massive expenditure need to improve the facilities to match the club's ambition. Johnsone acquired an option at the Lower Grounds in Aston long before his other directors were persuaded of its merits. Together with Chairman Fred Rinder they secured the deal to enable the move Villa's new home ground. It was still referred to as 'Aston Lower Grounds' for some time.

The Ever-presents were Charlie Athersmith, Jimmy Cowan, and Fred Wheldon. Villa first reached the top on 28 Nov and used 17 players throughout. John Campbell was not quite as productive as in the previous season, and the leading scorer honours went to Fred Wheldon. Fred had been signed in 1896 for £350 from local rivals Small Heath, who had been relegated the previous season. He was a good dribbler with the ball and won four caps for England. He played first class cricket for Worcestershire.

There were debuts for Fred Wheldon (123), Jimmy Whitehouse and Albert Evans.

== League ==
Pos	Team	Pld	W	D	L	GF	GA	GAv	Pts
1	Aston Villa (C)	30	21	5	4	73	38	1.921	47
2	Sheffield United	30	13	10	7	42	29	1.448	36
3	Derby County	30	16	4	10	70	50	1.400	36
4	Preston North End	30	11	12	7	55	40	1.375	34
5	Liverpool	30	12	9	9	46	38	1.211	33

Source: World Football
Rules for classification: 1) Points; 2) Goal average; 3) Goals scored
(C) Champions

A total of 16 teams competed in the 1896–97 Football League. Each team would play every other team twice, once at their stadium, and once at the opposition's. Two points were awarded to teams for each win, one point per draw, and none for defeats.

The season got off to a slow start, with Villa recording only two wins in the first six games. An unbeaten run of 12 games took them to the top, where they finished with a lead of 11 points. The title was won when Derby County F.C. failed to win on 10 April; Villa had three games left to play, all of which were won.

=== Matches ===
2 September 1896 1	Aston Villa	2–1	Stoke
	Jack Cowan (20'); Jack Devey	Report
Note: 🟩

5 September 1896 2	West Bromwich Albion	3–1	Aston Villa
		Report	Jack Devey
Note: 🟥

12 September 1896 3	Aston Villa	2–2	Sheffield United
	Fred Burton; Fred Wheldon	Report
Note: 🟨

19 September 1896 4	Everton	2–3	Aston Villa
		Report	Johnny Campbell (3)
Note: 🟩

26 September 1896 5	Aston Villa	1–2	Everton
	Jack Devey	Report
Note: 🟥

3 October 1896 6	Sheffield United	0–0	Aston Villa
		Report
Note: 🟨

10 October 1896 7	Aston Villa	2–0	West Bromwich Albion
	Fred Wheldon; Johnny Campbell	Report
Note: 🟩

17 October 1896 8	Derby County	1–3	Aston Villa
		Report	Fred Wheldon; Johnny Campbell; Jack Cowan
Note: 🟩

24 October 1896 9	Aston Villa	2–1	Derby County
	Jack Cowan; Fred Wheldon	Report
Note: 🟩

31 October 1896 10	Stoke	0–2	Aston Villa
		Report	Fred Wheldon; Steve Smith
Note: 🟩

7 November 1896 11	Aston Villa	1–1	Bury
	Charlie Athersmith	Report
Note: 🟨

14 November 1896 12	Sheffield Wednesday	1–3	Aston Villa
		Report	Fred Wheldon; Johnny Campbell; Charlie Athersmith
Note: 🟩

21 November 1896 13	Aston Villa	4–0	Sheffield Wednesday
	Steve Smith; Charlie Athersmith; Jack Devey; Fred Wheldon	Report
Note: 🟩

28 November 1896 14	Blackburn Rovers	1–5	Aston Villa	Ewood Park
		Report	Jack Devey; Johnny Campbell; Charlie Athersmith; Steve Smith; Unknown
Note: 🟩 GK Jimmy Whitehouse

19 December 1896 15	Aston Villa	3–2	Nottingham Forest
	Jack Reynolds (5'); Jack Devey (15'); Charlie Athersmith	Report
Note: 🟩

25 December 1896 16	Liverpool	3–3	Aston Villa
		Report	Jack Cowan; Fred Wheldon; Charlie Athersmith
Note: 🟨

26 December 1896 17	Wolverhampton Wanderers	1–2	Aston Villa
		Report	Bob Chatt; Charlie Athersmith
Note: 🟩

2 January 1897 18	Aston Villa	0–3	Burnley
		Report
Note: 🟥

9 January 1897 19	Sunderland	4–2	Aston Villa
		Report	Own Goal; Johnny Campbell
Note: 🟥

16 January 1897 20	Aston Villa	2–1	Sunderland
	Fred Wheldon; Unknown	Report
Note: 🟩

6 February 1897 21	Bury	0–2	Aston Villa
		Report	Johnny Campbell (2)
Note: 🟩

8 February 1897 22	Burnley	3–4	Aston Villa
		Report	Johnny Campbell; Jack Devey (2); Unknown
Note: 🟩

22 February 1897 23	Aston Villa	3–1	Preston North End
	Jack Devey; Charlie Athersmith	Report
Note: 🟩

6 March 1897 24	Nottingham Forest	2–4	Aston Villa
		Report	Jack Devey; Jack Cowan; Johnny Campbell; Fred Wheldon
Note: 🟩

13 March 1897 25	Aston Villa	0–0	Liverpool
		Report
Note: 🟨

22 March 1897 26	Aston Villa	6–2	Bolton Wanderers
	Charlie Athersmith; Jack Reynolds; Johnny Campbell; Fred Wheldon; others	Report
Note: 🟩

27 March 1897 27	Bolton Wanderers	1–2	Aston Villa
		Report	Johnny Campbell; Fred Wheldon
Note: 🟩

17 April 1897 28	Aston Villa	3–0	Blackburn Rovers
	Johnny Campbell; Fred Wheldon; Own Goal	Report
Note: 🟩

19 April 1897 29	Aston Villa	5–0	Wolverhampton Wanderers
	Jimmy Cowan; Jack Devey; Jack Cowan; Johnny Campbell (2)	Report
Note: 🟩

26 April 1897 30	Preston North End	0–1	Aston Villa
		Report	Fred Wheldon
Note: 🟩

Source: avfchistory.co.uk

== FA Cup ==
1897 FA Cup final
- Event: 1896–97 FA Cup
Aston Villa	Everton
3	2
- Date: 10 April 1897
- Venue: Crystal Palace, London
- Referee: J. Lewis
- Attendance: 65,891

The cup was won by Aston Villa, who defeated Everton 3–2 in the final of the competition, played at Crystal Palace in London. In doing so, Aston Villa became only the second team to have won the Double, as they won the league on the same day as their cup victory (and the only team to do this).

=== First round ===
The first round proper contained 16 ties between 32 teams. The matches were played on Saturday, 30 January 1897. One match was drawn, with the replay taking place in the following midweek fixture.

Tie no	Home team	Score	Away team	Date
5	Aston Villa	5–0	Newcastle United	30 January 1897

=== Second round ===
The eight Second Round matches were scheduled for Saturday, 13 February 1897. There was one replay, played in the following midweek fixture.

Tie no	Home team	Score	Away team	Date
3	Aston Villa	2–1	Notts County	13 February 1897

=== Third round ===
The four Third Round matches were scheduled for Saturday, 27 February 1897. There were two replays, played in the following midweek fixture, of which the Preston North End – Aston Villa match went to a second replay the following week.

Tie no	Home team	Score	Away team	Date
2	Preston North End	1–1	Aston Villa	27 February 1897
Replay	Aston Villa	0–0	Preston North End	3 March 1897
Replay	Aston Villa	3–2	Preston North End	8 March 1897

=== Semi-finals ===
The semi-final matches were both played on Saturday, 20 March 1897. Aston Villa and Everton went on to meet in the final at Crystal Palace.

20 March 1897

Aston Villa	3–0	Liverpool

Bramall Lane, Sheffield

=== Final ===
1896–97 FA Cup Final
10 April 1897
15:00 GMT

Aston Villa	3–2	Everton
Campbell 18'; Wheldon 35'; Crabtree 44'	Report	Bell 23'; Boyle 28'

Crystal Palace, London
Attendance: 65,891
Referee: J. Lewis

Aston Villa	Everton

GK	Jimmy Whitehouse
DF	Howard Spencer
DF	Jack Reynolds
MF	Albert Evans
MF	James Cowan
MF	Jimmy Crabtree
FW	Charlie Athersmith
FW	John Devey (c)
FW	John Campbell
FW	Fred Wheldon
FW	John Cowan
Secretary-Manager:
George Ramsay

GK	Bob Menham
DF	Peter Meehan
DF	David Storrier
MF	Dickie Boyle
MF	Johnny Holt
MF	Billy Stewart (c)
FW	Jack Taylor
FW	Jack Bell
FW	Abe Hartley
FW	Edgar Chadwick
FW	Alf Milward
Manager:
Dick Molyneux
