= George Ramsay (footballer, born 1855) =

Scottish footballer and manager (1855–1935)

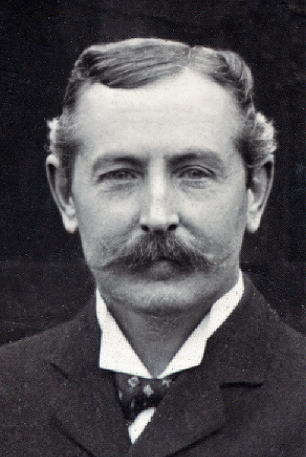
- Ramsay circa 1905

Personal information
- Full name: George Burrell Ramsay
- Date of birth: 1 March 1855
- Place of birth: Glasgow, Scotland
- Date of death: 7 October 1935 (aged 80)
- Place of death: Llandrindod Wells, Wales
- Position: Centre forward

Youth career
- Oxford F.C.
- Glasgow Rovers

Senior career*
Years	Team	Apps	(Gls)
1876–1882	Aston Villa	179	(217)

Managerial career
- 1886–1926: Aston Villa
- * Club domestic league appearances and goals

George Burrell Ramsay (4 March 1855 – 7 October 1935) was a Scottish footballer and manager. He has been described as the world's first football manager.

Ramsay was the secretary and manager of Aston Villa Football Club during the club's 'Golden Age'. As a player he was the first Aston Villa captain to lift a trophy, being instrumental in establishing the club as force in the game. A pioneer of the passing game, which he learned in his native Scotland, Aston Villa became renowned for their short, slick combination passing under his leadership.

His trophy haul of six League Championships and six FA Cups established Aston Villa as the most successful club in England. He has been described as the world's first paid football manager. To this day, Ramsay remains one of the most successful managers in the history of English football.

== Early life ==
Ramsay was born at Abbotsford Place in the Gorbals district of Glasgow, the second son of William Ramsay, a master ironmonger, who originated from Perthshire and Mary Ann Burrell who was born in Woolwich. After initially working with his father, the Glaswegian arrived in Birmingham 1876 to work as a clerk in a brass foundry.

== Playing career ==
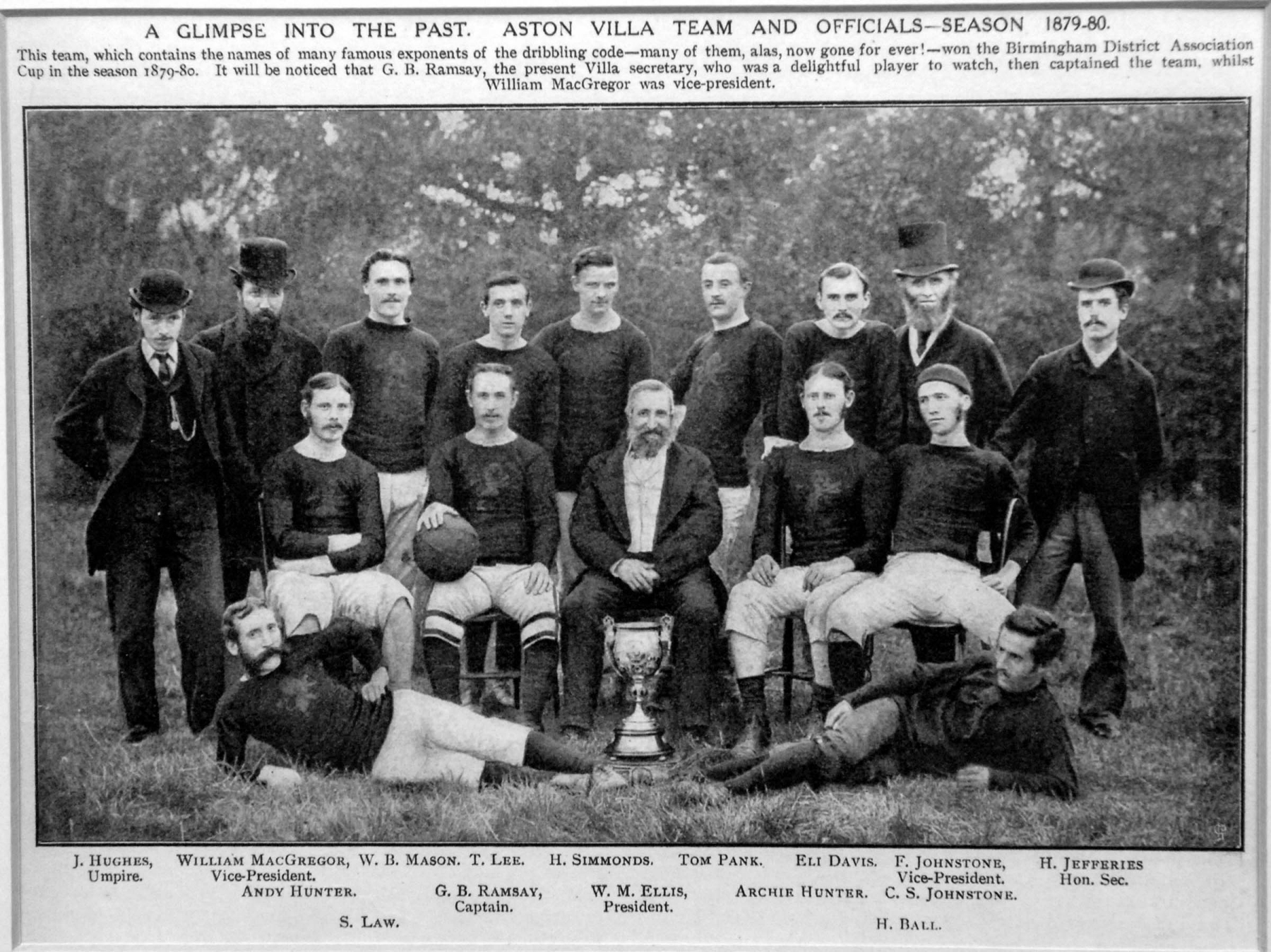
Villa's first trophy winning team with the Birmingham Senior Cup in 1880, captain George Ramsay is seated with the ball.

Prior to joining Aston Villa, Ramsay had played for Glasgow's Oxford F.C. and Rovers F.C. In 1877 he appeared as a guest player for Welsh club Druids, when they played a fixture against Queens Park.

Ramsay came to join Aston Villa by chance shortly after arriving in Birmingham. One day in 1876, whilst taking a stroll in Aston Park, the 21-year-old Ramsay came across a Villa players' practice match and was asked to make up the numbers. They were amazed by his skills, they had never seen a display of close ball control before. When the game was over, the Villa players surrounded him and invited him to join the club, and very soon he became their captain. Ramsay later described the newly formed club's approach to the game as 'a dash at the man and a big kick at the ball'. Word spread about how fine a player Ramsay was, spectators began turning up to watch the little man nicknamed 'Scotty'. He also took charge of training which saw dramatic improvement that showed in the results, introducing what was known as the "passing game". This had become the main style of play in Scotland whereas in England most teams relied on what was known as the "dribbling game".

"It was George Ramsay who first moulded the style of the club's play, and the Aston Villa team have never lost the reputation they gained for short, quick passing under Ramsay's direction".

— William McGregor, C.B Fry's Magazine 1904

In addition to the introduction of a radical change in playing style, Ramsay, along with John Linsay, discovered the Wellington Road ground at Perry Barr in 1876, which meant the club was able to charge admission for the first time. He was also responsible for the recruitment of Villa legend Archie Hunter, who later recounted the story in his 1890 memoir Triumphs of the Football Field.

Aston Villa to me as a club that had come rapidly to the fore and asked me to become a member of it. I hesitated for some time, but at last my friend told me that a "brother Scot," Mr. George Ramsay, was the Villa captain and that decided me. Mr. Ramsay was a Glasgow man and had exerted himself very considerably to bring the Villa team into the front rank. Mr. Ramsay was practically the founder of the Aston Villa Football Club.

— Archie Hunter, Triumphs of the Football Field

Villa gradually improved under his guidance,"the influence of Ramsay, then Hunter, led Villa to develop an intricate passing game, a revolutionary move for an English club in the late 1870s. It was a style of play modelled on that which was prevalent in Scotland at the time and which had been pioneered by Queen's Park, the Glasgow side. This type of sophisticated teamwork had rarely been employed in England." Villa were becoming a force to be reckoned with in the Midlands, which culminated in the club winning their first trophy, The Birmingham Senior Cup, in 1880, with Ramsay as captain. The club would go on to lift the trophy 9 times in the next 12 seasons. William McGregor later recalled:

"I can see now the little dapper, well-built laddie, with a black-and-red striped cap, red-and-blue hooped jersey, and the same coloured stockings, getting hold of the ball on the extreme wing, well within his own territory, and going off like streaked lightning, wiggling, waggling past opponents one after another and finally landing the ball between the sticks."

— C.B. Fry's Magazine 1904

Ramsay retired from playing at the age of just 27 due to an injury sustained during an early experimental floodlit match against Nottingham Forest at Villa's Perry Bar ground in 1882. He handed the captaincy to fellow Scotsman, Archie Hunter, but remained involved with the club serving on the committee.

== Management career ==
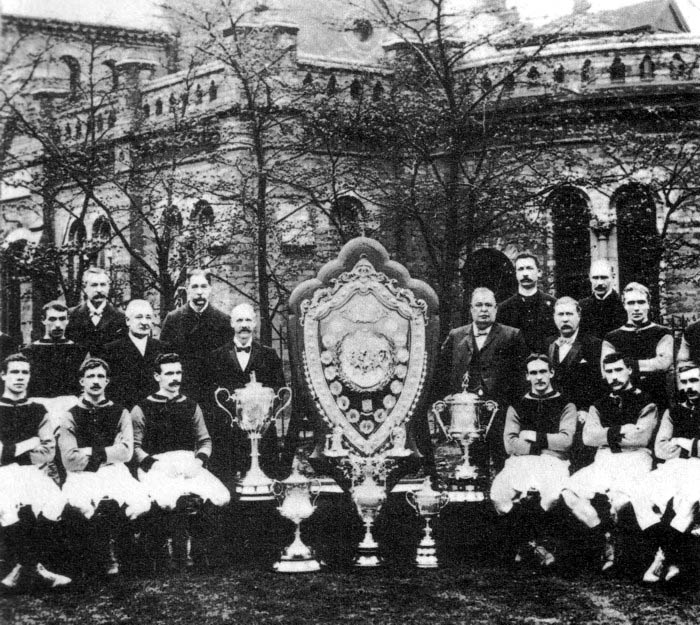
The hugely successful team Ramsay assembled at the end of the 19th century. Ramsay can be seen standing on the far left of the back row.

A giant of the game, Ramsay won the most league titles of any manager in England until he was surpassed by Sir Alex Ferguson in 1999–00 and the most FA Cup trophies until surpassed by Arsene Wenger in 2016–17

Following the professionalisation of football in 1885, the club decided that it needed a full-time paid manager. The following advert was placed in the Birmingham Daily Gazette newspaper in June 1886:

'Wanted: manager for Aston Villa Football Club, who will be required to devote his whole time under direction of the committee. Salary £100 per annum. Applications with reference must be made not later than June 23rd to Chairman of the Committee, Aston Villa Club House, 6 Witton Road, Aston'

Villa received 150 applicants for the role, but with his strong association with the club George Ramsay was the overwhelming choice of the membership. Thus on 26 June 1886, Villa appointed what has been described as the world's first football manager. The position predates the modern role of a football manager, the advert used the title 'manager' but the club settled on the title of 'secretary'. Ramsay was responsible for the team, including controlling recruitment and transfers, supported by a specialist fitness trainer, who from 1893 until 1915 was Joe Grierson. The team was selected by the committee each week, which consisted of such figures as William McGregor, Fred Rinder and, following their retirement, former club captains John Devey and Howard Spencer.

He held his position at the club for a remarkable 42 years, in which time Villa won the Football League and FA Cup six times each, establishing themselves as the premier football club in England. Villa's style of play under Ramsay consisted of high speed dribbling, short passes and powerful shooting. In a rare interview in 1920, Ramsay said of Villa's playing style:

"The Villa has invariably been scientific more than vigorous, yet have never descended to over-elaboration. Somebody once said that the Villa game was 'science without frills.' We have never been accused of dirty football. There is a grand feeling of fellowship and espirit de corps in the Villa ranks. This has been a tradition with the club. We have been as particular about the character of the players as about their skill. If a man has not measured up to the Villa standard of a gentleman and a sportsman, he has gone."

The Villa News remarked in October 1935 that: "He was not content that Aston Villa should be noted just in the playing sense; his demand was that it should become an institution with a world-wide reputation for probity in sportsmanship".

Aston Villa's success under Ramsay was built upon a scouting network that signed up the best young players from Birmingham and the Black Country towns and moulding them to play 'the Villa way'. Players such as John Devey, Charlie Athersmith, Howard Spencer, Billy Garraty, Steve Smith, Joe Bache, Billy Walker and Frank Moss were all local lads who played starring roles for Villa during the club's golden era. The team was reinforced by a strong contingent of talented Scottish players such as Archie Hunter, James Cowan and John Campbell.

George Ramsay in 1913, following his fifth FA Cup win.

Howard Spencer, Villa's captain from 1902 to 1907, once said:

"We like to get young men and turn them into our particular style. This style is difficult to describe, but we prefer skilful control of the ball, sound defence, and, above all, teamwork. Aston Villa never had a coach. The older players teach the younger ones. The older players taught me, and experience, I suppose, did the rest."

Spencer was one of a succession of Aston Villa captains that, starting with Ramsay himself, maintained the club's distinctive and highly successful playing style for over 40 years. Archie Hunter, John Devey, Howard Spencer, Joe Bache, Frank Moss and Billy Walker, all captained the club under Ramsay and were important influences both on and off the pitch.

Ramsay later said of his role in the establishment of Aston Villa as the most successful football club in England:

"Aston Villa have always been my love. I helped to plant the tree and have seen a grand oak grow."

In 1926, with his health failing due to arthritis, Ramsay retired as secretary at the age of 71. He was made honorary advisor and a vice-president of the Club. His replacement W. J. Smith was unable to continue Ramsay's success, although the club did finish runners-up in the league twice under his guidance. In 1934 Smith stood down and the club decided to appoint its first manager, Jimmy McMullan. The following year Ramsay died at the age of 80. Within a year of his death the Midlands giants were relegated, an unthinkable notion in the Ramsay era.

In all, Ramsay's association with the football club lasted 59 years, a time which will always be known as Aston Villa's 'Golden Age'. Ramsay was laid to rest at St Mary's Church, Handsworth, his gravestone reads "Founder of Aston Villa".

== Personal life ==
He married Fanny Elizabeth Warwick, an Aston girl, in 1893. They had two sons and one daughter. Ramsay divorced his wife on the grounds of her adultery in 1915.

In later life, Ramsay was a keen player of crown green bowls and won several competitions. He often played at the Welsh spa town of Llandrindod Wells, where he spent much of his retirement.

== Honours ==
Aston Villa

- First Division Champions (6): 1893–94, 1895–96, 1896–97, 1898–99, 1899–1900, 1909–10
  - Runners up (6): 1889, 1903, 1908, 1911, 1913, 1914
- FA Cup Winners (6): 1886–87, 1894–95, 1896–97, 1904–05, 1912–13, 1919–20
  - Runners up (2): 1892, 1924
- Sheriff of London Charity Shield (2): 1899 (shared), 1901

Ramsay was awarded two long service medals by the Football League, his first in 1909 and his second in 1927.

He was inducted into the inaugural Aston Villa Hall of Fame in 2006.

== See also ==
- List of English football championship winning managers
- List of football managers with the most matches
