= James Elliott (footballer) =

English footballer

Personal information
- Date of birth: 20 October 1869
- Place of birth: Middlesbrough, England
- Date of death: 1899 (aged 29–30)
- Position: Full back

Senior career*
Years	Team	Apps	(Gls)
1892–1893	Middlesbrough Ironopolis		
1893–1895	Aston Villa	19	(0)
Total		19	(0)
- * Club domestic league appearances and goals

James Alexander E. Elliott (20 October 1869 – 1899) was an English footballer who played in the Football League for Aston Villa.
