= John Campbell (footballer, born 1872) =

Scottish footballer

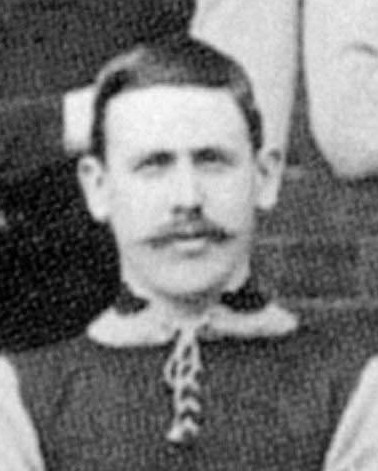
- Campbell in 1897

Personal information
- Full name: John James Campbell
- Date of birth: 19 August 1872
- Place of birth: Glasgow, Scotland
- Date of death: 2 December 1947 (aged 75)
- Place of death: Glasgow, Scotland
- Positions: Forward; winger

Youth career
- Possil Hawthorn

Senior career*
Years	Team	Apps	(Gls)
1888–1890	Benburb		
1890–1895	Celtic	74	(43)
1895–1897	Aston Villa	55	(39)
1897–1903	Celtic	94	(49)
1903–1906	Third Lanark	40	(12)
Total		263	(143)

International career
1893–1903	Scotland	12	(4)
1893–1902 (Note: The source lists 5 matches, but a match in 1901 is counted twice; Campbell did play, but Bobby Neill was omitted.)	Scottish League XI	4	(3)
- * Club domestic league appearances and goals

John James Campbell (19 August 1872 – 2 December 1947) was a Scottish footballer, who played for Celtic, Aston Villa, Third Lanark and the Scotland national team.

== Career ==
Campbell was born in Glasgow and began his football career at Junior team Benburb before stepping up to join Celtic in 1890, where he won two league championship titles in the 1892–93 season and the 1893–94 season, as well as the Scottish Cup in 1892.

He moved to English club Aston Villa in the summer of 1895 and won the English league title in the 1895–96 season, while leading the league in goals with 22.

Villa retained the league title in the 1896–97 season and Campbell scored in the club's FA Cup final triumph against Everton to win the domestic double. Just days later, he had the honour of scoring the first goal at Villa Park.

He returned to Celtic soon after and won another league title in the 1897–98 season, including a further two Scottish Cup winners medals in 1899 and 1900. He moved to Third Lanark in 1903 and helped them to the league title in his first season with the club, having scored a Glasgow Cup-winning goal against his former employers in the opening part of the season, although he did not play in Thirds' Scottish Cup win of 1905. He retired in 1906.

Campbell was capped twelve times by Scotland between 1893 and 1903. He scored four goals, including two against Ireland in March 1900. He captained Scotland against Wales in 1902.

== See also ==
- List of Celtic F.C. players
- List of Scotland national football team captains
