= 1895–96 Aston Villa F.C. season =

English football club season

Aston Villa
1895–96 season
- President: Joseph Ansell
- Chairman: Joshua Margoschis
- Manager: George Ramsay
- Ground: Wellington Road
- First Division: Champions (2)
- FA Cup: Round 1

First Division
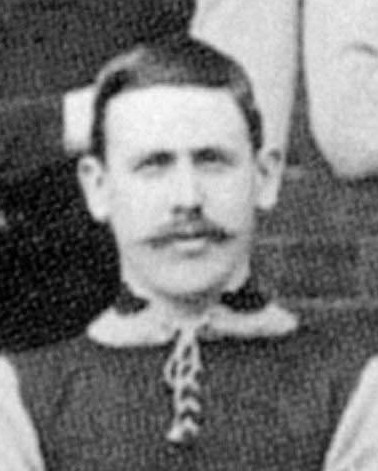
- Season: 1895–96
- Champions: Aston Villa, 2nd title
- Relegated: Small Heath
- Top goalscorer: 22 John Campbell (above); 22 Steve Bloomer
- Biggest home win: Derby County 8–0 Small Heath (30 November 1895); Sheffield United 8–0 Bury (6 April 1896)
- Biggest away win: The Wednesday 0–4 Derby County (28 December 1895)
- Highest scoring: Aston Villa 7–3 Small Heath (7 September 1895)
- Longest winning run: 9 matches Everton
- Longest unbeaten run: 14 matches Everton
- Longest losing run: 6 matches Burnley; Small Heath
- Highest attendance: 30,000; Everton 2–0 Aston Villa (21 December 1895)
- Lowest attendance: 560; West Brom 3–2 Blackburn Rovers (29 April 1896)

Second City Derby
- 4--0--1

The 1895–96 English football season was Aston Villa's 8th season in the Football League. Under George Ramsay's management committee Villa were League champions for the second time in their history.

This was the season Villa lost the FA Cup – literally. Following their FA Cup win in 1894/95, it was on display in the window of a Birmingham shoe shop belonging to William Shillcock. In the night of 11–12 September 1895 it was stolen and never seen again. The first trophy, the 'little tin idol', had been made by Martin, Hall & Co at a cost of £20. Despite a £10 reward for information, the crime was never solved. The FA fined Villa £25 to pay for a replacement and a replica had to be made to the same design. Luckily they had it insured for £200! Just over 60 years later, 80 year old career criminal Henry (Harry) James Burge claimed to have committed the theft, confessing to a newspaper, with the story being published in the Sunday Pictorial newspaper on 23 February 1958. Burge claimed the cup had been melted down to make counterfeit half-crown coins, which matched known intelligence of the time that stolen silver was being used to forge coins which were then laundered through betting shops at a local racecourse.

Jimmy Crabtree (176) became Aston Villa's record signing in the summer of 1895 when the Club paid Burnley £250 for international back. Crabtree, Reynolds and Jimmy Cowan formed an outstanding line of half-backs. There were also debuts for Johnny Campbell, Jack Cowan, Edward Harris and Jeremiah Griffiths. John Campbell was a Scot from Celtic where he had won the Scottish championship twice, and later returned to the club. He had developed an outstanding reputation in Scotland, and emphasized his skill by scoring his 26 goals in just 26 games. 5 feet 9 inches (1.75 m) tall but nearly 12 stone (170 lb; 76 kg) in weight, he was said to be difficult to stop when running at the opposition's defence.

== First Division ==
| Pos | Team | Pld | W | D | L | GF | GA | GAv | Pts |
|---|---|---|---|---|---|---|---|---|---|
| 1 | Aston Villa (C) | 30 | 20 | 5 | 5 | 78 | 45 | 1.733 | 45 |
| 2 | Derby County | 30 | 17 | 7 | 6 | 68 | 35 | 1.943 | 41 |
| 3 | Everton | 30 | 16 | 7 | 7 | 66 | 43 | 1.535 | 39 |
| 4 | Bolton Wanderers | 30 | 16 | 5 | 9 | 49 | 37 | 1.324 | 37 |
| 5 | Sunderland | 30 | 15 | 7 | 8 | 52 | 41 | 1.268 | 37 |

Source: World Football
Rules for classification: 1) Points; 2) Goal average; 3) Goals scored
(C) Champions

Ever-present: Jack Devey

Players used: 18

=== Matches ===
| 2 September 1895 Match 1 | Aston Villa | 1–0 | West Bromwich Albion |
| | Jack Devey | Report |
Note: 🟩

| 7 September 1895 Match 2 | Aston Villa | 7–3 | Small Heath |
| | Johnny Campbell (3); Steve Smith; Jack Devey (2); Jimmy Cowan | Report |
Note: 🟩 The 1895–96 Division 1 season was the second season of the elite level Second City Derby against local rivals Small Heath. According to the Birmingham Daily Post, [Jim Roach] should take no blame for any of the five goals conceded before half-time, due in part to the sun in his eyes and with the half-backs "little more than landmarks on the field". On change of ends, the balance of play tilted towards the visitors, but the match still finished 7–3.

| 14 September 1895 Match 3 | Sheffield United | 2–1 | Aston Villa |
| | | Report | Dennis Hodgetts |
Note: 🟥

| 21 September 1895 Match 4 | Aston Villa | 4–1 | Derby County |
| | Jack Cowan; Jack Devey; Johnny Campbell; Jimmy Cowan | Report |
Note: 🟩

| 28 September 1895 Match 5 | Blackburn Rovers | 1–1 | Aston Villa |
| | | Report | Johnny Campbell |
Note: 🟨

| 30 September 1895 Match 6 | Aston Villa | 4–3 | Everton |
| | Jack Cowan; Charlie Athersmith; Jack Devey; Johnny Campbell | Report |
Note: 🟩 Villa reached the top of the League table for the first time in 1895–96.

| 5 October 1895 Match 7 | Aston Villa | 2–1 | Sunderland |
| | Johnny Campbell; Jack Cowan | Report |
Note: 🟩

| 12 October 1895 Match 8 | West Bromwich Albion | 1–1 | Aston Villa |
| | | Report | Johnny Campbell |
Note: 🟨

| 19 October 1895 Match 9 | Aston Villa | 3–1 | Blackburn Rovers |
| | Jimmy Crabtree; Dennis Hodgetts; Billy Dorrell | Report |
Note: 🟩

| 26 October 1895 Match 10 | Small Heath | 1–4 | Aston Villa |
| | | Report | Jack Devey (2); Jack Reynolds; Johnny Campbell |
Note: 🟩 When Villa visited Coventry Road/Muntz Street they won the fixture 4–1.

| 2 November 1895 Match 11 | Aston Villa | 5–1 | Burnley |
| | Charlie Athersmith (2); Jack Devey (2); Unknown | Report |
Note: 🟩

| 9 November 1895 Match 12 | Sunderland | 2–1 | Aston Villa |
| | | Report | Johnny Campbell |
Note: 🟥

| 16 November 1895 Match 13 | Aston Villa | 2–2 | Sheffield United |
| | Jack Cowan; Bob Chatt | Report |
Note: 🟨

| 23 November 1895 Match 14 | Burnley | 3–4 | Aston Villa |
| | | Report | Unknown; Jimmy Crabtree; Jack Reynolds; Charlie Athersmith |
Note: 🟩

| 7 December 1895 Match 15 | Preston North End | 4–3 | Aston Villa |
| | | Report | Unknown; Johnny Campbell |
Note: 🟥

| 14 December 1895 Match 16 | Aston Villa | 2–0 | Bolton Wanderers |
| | Jimmy Welford; Johnny Campbell | Report |
Note: 🟩

| 21 December 1895 Match 17 | Everton | 2–0 | Aston Villa |
| | | Report |
Note: 🟥

| 26 December 1895 Match 18 | Wolverhampton Wanderers | 1–2 | Aston Villa |
| | | Report | Steve Smith; Howard Spencer |
Note: 🟩

| 28 December 1895 Match 19 | Aston Villa | 2–0 | Bury |
| | Johnny Campbell | Report |
Note: 🟩 Derby County won all 10 home games and led the table at the end of December, with Villa in third.

| 4 January 1896 Match 20 | Stoke | 1–2 | Aston Villa |
| | | Report | Johnny Campbell (2) |
Note: 🟩 James Cowan missed the new year fixture due to his attending (and winning) the illustrious 100 yard New Year Sprint event held at Powderhall, Scotland. The club fined him but he still made a healthy profit due to the prize money!

| 11 January 1896 Match 21 | Aston Villa | 1–0 | Preston North End |
| | Jack Cowan | Report |
Note: 🟩

| 18 January 1896 Match 22 | Wednesday | 1–3 | Aston Villa |
| | | Report | Jack Cowan; Johnny Campbell; Jimmy Crabtree |
Note: 🟩

| 25 January 1896 Match 23 | Aston Villa | 3–1 | Nottingham Forest |
| | Jack Cowan; Bob Chatt; Jack Devey | Report |
Note: 🟩Six consecutive wins took Villa to the top in January

| 8 February 1896 Match 24 | Derby County | 2–2 | Aston Villa |
| | | Report | Jack Devey; Charlie Athersmith |
Note: 🟨

| 22 February 1896 Match 25 | Aston Villa | 5–2 | Stoke |
| | Bob Chatt; Johnny Campbell (2); Jack Devey | Report |
Note: 🟩

| 7 March 1896 Match 26 | Bolton Wanderers | 2–2 | Aston Villa |
| | | Report | Jack Devey |
Note: 🟨

| 14 March 1896 Match 27 | Aston Villa | 2–1 | Wednesday |
| | Jack Cowan; Jack Devey | Report |
Note: 🟩

| 21 March 1896 Match 28 | Bury | 5–3 | Aston Villa |
| | | Report | Jack Devey; Johnny Campbell; Jack Cowan |
Note: 🟥

| 3 April 1896 Match 29 | Nottingham Forest | 0–2 | Aston Villa |
| | | Report | Fred Burton; Johnny Campbell |
Note: 🟩

| 6 April 1896 Match 30 | Aston Villa | 4–1 | Wolverhampton Wanderers |
| | Jack Cowan; Johnny Campbell (2); Jimmy Crabtree | Report |
Note: 🟩

== FA Cup ==
The First Round contained sixteen ties between 32 teams. The matches were played on Saturday, 1 February 1896.

| Tie no | Home team | Score | Away team | Date |
|---|---|---|---|---|
| 12 | Derby County | 4–2 | Aston Villa | 1 February 1896 |
