= Jack Devey =

English footballer and cricketer (1866–1940)

John Devey
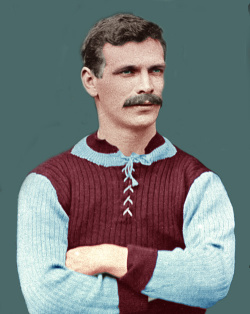

Personal information
- Full name: John Henry George Devey
- Date of birth: 26 December 1866
- Place of birth: Newtown, Birmingham, England
- Date of death: 11 October 1940 (aged 73)
- Place of death: Birmingham, England
- Position: Striker

Senior career*
Years	Team	Apps	(Gls)
- Wellington Road
- Excelsior
- Aston Unity
- Aston Manor
1889	West Bromwich Albion	0	(0)
1889–1891	Mitchells St George's		
1891–1902	Aston Villa	268	(168)
Total		268	(168)

International career
1891	Football Alliance XI	1	(0)
1892–1894	England	2	(1)
Baseball career
Pitcher
Bats: Right
Throws: Right
- * Club domestic league appearances and goals

John Henry George Devey (26 December 1866 – 11 October 1940) was an English football player and a first-class cricketer. He is Aston Villa's most successful player and considered one of their greatest captains.

== Football career ==
Devey was born in Birmingham and signed for Aston Villa in March 1891; A skilful inside right/centre-forward and an England international with two caps, he was exceptionally clever with head and feet in front of goal and a prolific goalscorer. He was Villa's top goal scorer in 6 of his 12 seasons with the club.

For eight years, Devey captained Aston Villa during which time they won the League championship five times between 1894 and 1900 and the FA Cup twice. Including the famous 'Double' in the 1896–97 season.

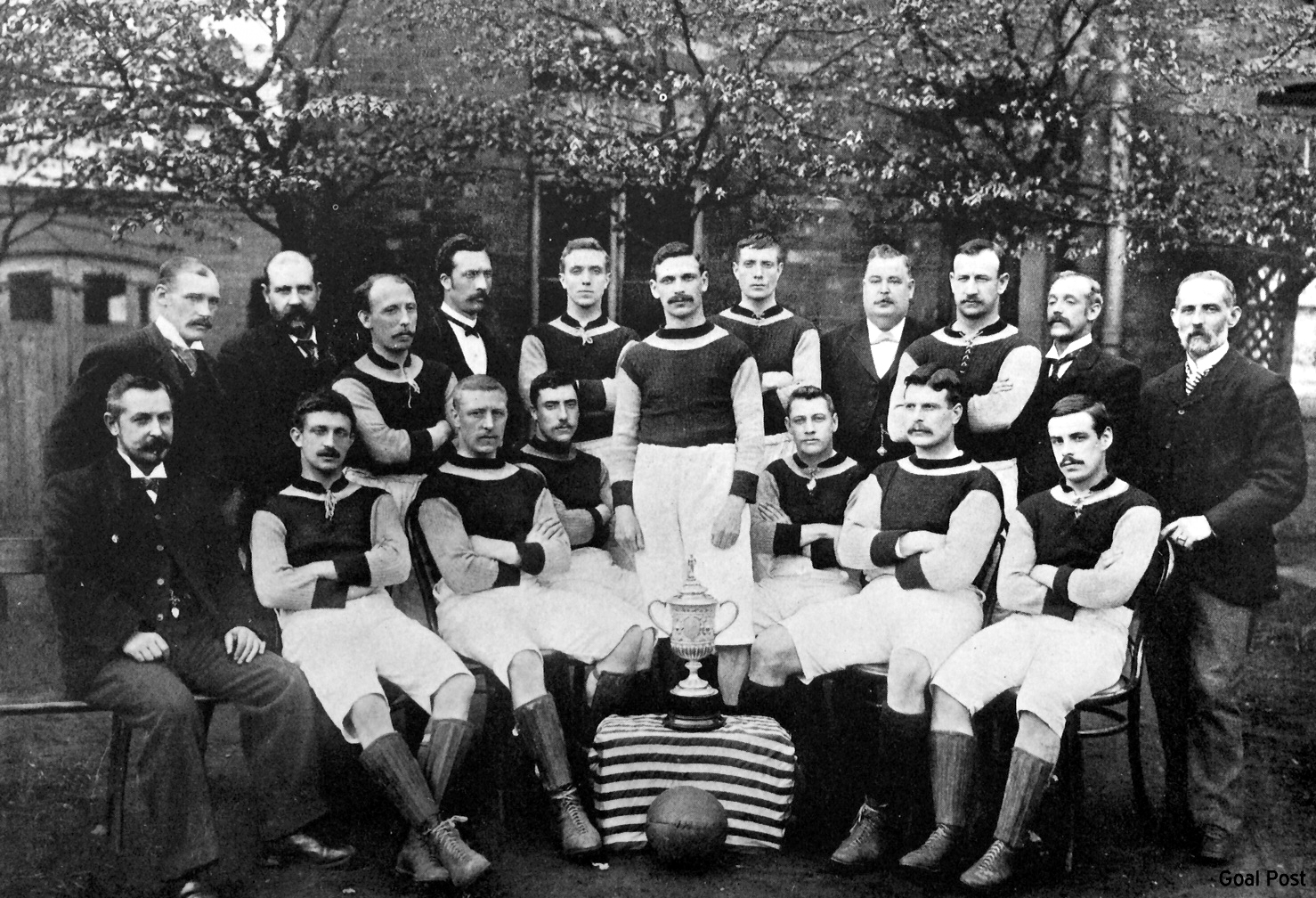
Captain John Devey standing in front of the FA Cup which the club won for the second time in 1895

In October 1896 Devey was awarded a benefit match against Derby County, after which he was presented with an illuminated address from the club with the following words:

"Your courteous demeanour, manliness of character, love of fair play, and power as a leader, have alike endeared you to comrades and opponents, whilst the willing admiration of countless thousands has testified to your skill on the football and cricket fields".

— Tribute to Devey on illuminated address presented to him on the occasion of his benefit match in 1896,

William McGregor said this about Devey:

"It was under the guidance of that gentlemanly and talented leader, John Devey, that the golden age of the Villa club was reached. John Devey assumed the captaincy in 1892. Under his leadership the club won the League five times and the English Cup twice".

— William McGregor, C.B Fry's Magazine 1904

He retired as a player in April 1902 and was an Aston Villa director for the next 32 years, during which time he was actively involved with training and scouting new players.

== Cricket career ==
Jack Devey was also a Warwickshire cricketer, first appearing for the county side in 1887. The matches were rated as first-class from 1894 and he played many times at this standard. There was always a stir among the crowd when he came in to bat. He was a right-handed batsman who batted in the middle order until around 1900, but then opened the innings until his final retirement from the game in 1907. He also bowled occasional right-arm medium pace.

== Professional baseball ==
In 1890 Devey played professional baseball for Aston Villa in the National League of Baseball of Great Britain. He was a gifted two-way player player, who led the statistical categories at the end of the year, including being the league's batting champion. Devey was inducted into the British Baseball Hall of Fame in 2012.

== Family ==
He was one of five brothers who all played professional football, Ted and Will for Small Heath and John, Harry and Bob for Aston Villa. Another brother, Abel, was a cricketer with Staffordshire.

== Death ==
Devey stood down as a Villa director in 1934. He died 11 October 1940. The pall bearers at his funeral were six former Villa players: Billy Walker, Richard York, Arthur Dorrell, Jimmy Gibson, George Brown and Frank Barson ― all old international players.

== Honours ==
Aston Villa

- Football League First Division: 1893–94, 1895–96, 1896–97, 1898–99, 1899–1900
- FA Cup: 1895, 1897
- Sheriff of London Charity Shield: 1901
- National League of Baseball: 1890
