= 1898–99 Aston Villa F.C. season =

English football club season

Aston Villa
1898–99 season
- Chairman: Frederick Rinder
- Manager: George Ramsay
- First Division: 1st (champions, 4th title)
- FA Cup: First round
- Top goalscorer: Fred Wheldon (16)

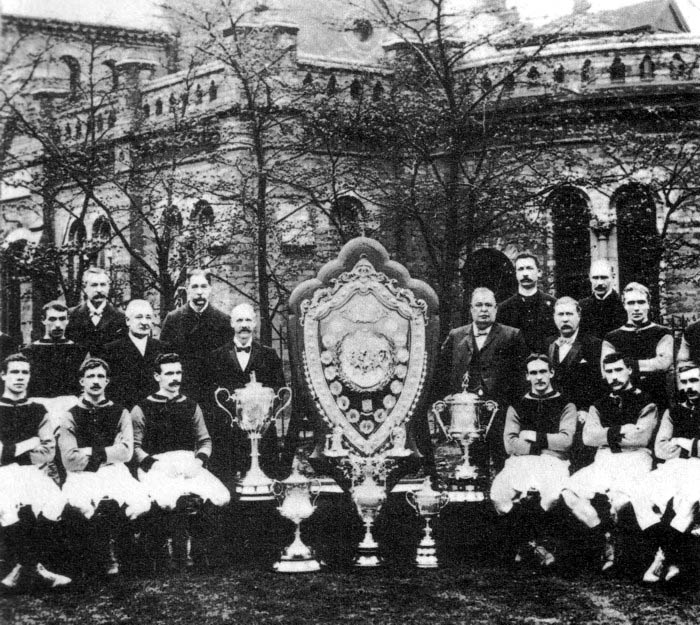
The Aston Villa team of 1899 that won the First Division and the Sheriff of London Charity Shield (centre)

First Division
- Season: 1898–99
- Champions: Aston Villa, 4th English title
- Relegated: Bolton Wanderers, Wednesday
- Top goalscorer: Steve Bloomer (23 goals)
- Biggest home win: Derby County 9–0 Wednesday (21 January 1899)
- Biggest away win: Liverpool 0–3 Aston Villa (15 October 1898); Nottingham Forest 0–3 Liverpool (26 November 1898); Wednesday 0–3 Liverpool (31 December 1898)
- Highest scoring: Derby County 5–5 Everton (15 October 1898)
- Longest winning run: 8 matches Aston Villa
- Longest unbeaten run: 17 matches Liverpool
- Longest losing run: 4 matches Everton; Sheffield United; Sunderland; The Wednesday; Wolverhampton Wanderers
- Highest attendance: 41,000; Aston Villa 5–0 Liverpool (29 April 1899)
- Lowest attendance: 1,000; Bury 1–1 Newcastle United (22 October 1898); West Brom 2–0 Notts Forest (24 December 1898); West Brom 6–2 Blackburn (21 January 1899)
- Average attendance: 10,004

The 1898–99 English football season was Aston Villa's 11th season in the Football League, the top flight of English football. Villa were champions for an unequalled fourth time.

Tommy Bowman was ever-present in the League campaign. There were debuts for Walter Leigh, Albert Wilkes, Billy Haggart, Frank Bedingfield, Bobby Templeton and Ralph Gaudie (5). To ensure a competitive campaign Burslem Port Vale signed striker Howard Harvey from Aston Villa for £50 to bolster what remained a semi-professional squad.

Three of Villa’s 1897 double-winning team joined Celtic in the summer of 1897, so the previous season had proved to be a rebuilding period for the club. By the mid-point of 1898/99, Villa had a narrow lead over Everton and Burnley but a late season run by Liverpool dropped them to second place. It came down to ‘last-game decider’, with Villa at home to Liverpool. 41,000 spectators shoe-horned themselves into Villa Park to see an emphatic win by the home team, 5–0.

Aston Villa Reserves won the Walsall Senior Cup in 1899.

== League ==
Pos	Team	Pld	W	D	L	GF	GA	GAv	Pts
1	Aston Villa (C)	34	19	7	8	76	40	1.900	45
2	Liverpool	34	19	5	10	49	33	1.485	43
3	Burnley	34	15	9	10	45	47	0.957	39
4	Everton	34	15	8	11	48	41	1.171	38
5	Notts County	34	12	13	9	47	51	0.922	37

Source: World Football
Rules for classification: 1) Points; 2) Goal average; 3) Goals scored
(C) Champions

Players used: 23

3 September 1898 Match 1	Aston Villa	3–1	Stoke City	Wellington Road
	Charlie Athersmith; Jack Devey; Ralph Gaudie	Report
Note: 🟩

10 September 1898 Match 2	Bury	2–1	Aston Villa	Gigg Lane
		Report	Fred Wheldon
Note: 🟥

17 September 1898 Match 3	Burnley	2–4	Aston Villa	Turf Moor
		Report	Steve Smith (2); George Johnson; Charlie Athersmith
Note: 🟩

24 September 1898 Match 4	Aston Villa	1–1	Sheffield United	Wellington Road
	Jack Devey	Report
Note: 🟨

1 October 1898 Match 5	Newcastle United	1–1	Aston Villa	St James' Park
		Report	Jack Devey
Note: 🟨

8 October 1898 Match 6	Aston Villa	4–2	Preston North End	Wellington Road
	Jack Devey (2); Jimmy Cowan; George Johnson	Report
Note: 🟩

15 October 1898 Match 7	Liverpool	0–3	Aston Villa	Anfield
		Report	George Johnson; Jack Devey; Fred Wheldon
Note: 🟩

22 October 1898 Match 8	Aston Villa	3–0	Nottingham Forest	Wellington Road
	Jack Sharp (2); Jack Devey	Report
Note: 🟩

29 October 1898 Match 9	Aston Villa	2–1	Bolton Wanderers	Wellington Road
	Fred Wheldon; Jack Devey	Report
Note: 🟩 First at top

5 November 1898 Match 10	Aston Villa	7–1	Derby County	Wellington Road
	Jack Devey (2); George Johnson (2); Fred Wheldon (2); Jack Cowan	Report
Note: 🟩

12 November 1898 Match 11	West Bromwich Albion	0–1	Aston Villa	Stoney Lane
		Report	George Johnson
Note: 🟩

19 November 1898 Match 12	Aston Villa	3–1	Blackburn Rovers	Wellington Road
	Jack Devey; Fred Wheldon (2)	Report
Note: 🟩

26 November 1898 Match 13	Sheffield Wednesday	3–1	Aston Villa	Olive Grove
		Report	Steve Smith
Note: 🟥 The season was notable for one of those one-off, never repeated events that enliven League history. The referee was late arriving for the match at The Wednesday. After some deliberation, it was decided to start without him. Though he took over at half-time, the delay meant that darkness fell with 10 minutes left to play. Wednesday were the better team on the day and led 3–1 at the time. The League consulted the rule-book and decided that the last 10 minutes would have to be played at a later date. The first suggestion was that perhaps the 10 minutes could be played before the return game at Villa Park. In the end, Villa agreed to play Wednesday in a benefit match for one of their players, and the missing minutes were duly played out before the friendly game. Villa made one change for the second game, Garraty replacing Bedingfield.

3 December 1898 Match 14	Aston Villa	2–0	Sunderland	Wellington Road
	Jack Sharp (2)	Report
Note: 🟩

10 December 1898 Match 15	Aston Villa	1–1	Wolverhampton Wanderers	Wellington Road
	Jimmy Crabtree	Report
Note: 🟨

17 December 1898 Match 16	Aston Villa	3–0	Everton	Wellington Road
	Fred Wheldon; Jack Devey; George Johnson	Report
Note: 🟩

24 December 1898 Match 17	Notts County	1–0	Aston Villa	Trent Bridge
		Report
Note: 🟥

26 December 1898 Match 18	Aston Villa	1–0	Newcastle United	Wellington Road
	Charlie Athersmith	Report
Note: 🟩

31 December 1898 Match 19	Stoke City	3–0	Aston Villa	Victoria Ground
		Report
Note: 🟥

7 January 1899 Match 20	Aston Villa	3–2	Bury	Wellington Road
	Fred Wheldon; Jack Devey (2)	Report
Note: 🟩

14 January 1899 Match 21	Aston Villa	4–0	Burnley	Wellington Road
	Fred Wheldon; Charlie Athersmith; Own goal; Tommy Bowman	Report
Note: 🟩

21 January 1899 Match 22	Sheffield United	3–1	Aston Villa	Bramall Lane
		Report	Albert Wilkes; George Johnson; Jack Cowan
Note: 🟥

4 February 1899 Match 23	Preston North End	0–2	Aston Villa	Deepdale
		Report
Note: 🟩

18 February 1899 Match 24	Nottingham Forest	0–1	Aston Villa	City Ground
		Report
Note: 🟩

4 March 1899 Match 25	Derby County	1–1	Aston Villa	Baseball Ground
		Report	George Johnson
Note: 🟨

18 March 1899 Match 26	Blackburn Rovers	0–0	Aston Villa	Ewood Park
		Report
Note: 🟨

25 March 1899 Match 27	Aston Villa	3–1	Sheffield Wednesday	Wellington Road
	Fred Wheldon; Billy Garraty; George Johnson	Report
Note: 🟩

1 April 1899 Match 28	Sunderland	4–2	Aston Villa	Roker Park
		Report	Jack Devey; Jimmy Cowan
Note: 🟥

3 April 1899 Match 29	Wolverhampton Wanderers	4–0	Aston Villa	Molineux
		Report
Note: 🟥

15 April 1899 Match 30	Everton	1–1	Aston Villa	Goodison Park
		Report	Steve Smith
Note: 🟨

17 April 1899 Match 31	Bolton Wanderers	0–0	Aston Villa	Burnden Park
		Report
Note: 🟨

22 April 1899 Match 32	Aston Villa	6–1	Notts County	Wellington Road
	Jack Devey (3); Fred Wheldon; Billy Garraty (2)	Report
Note: 🟩

24 April 1899 Match 33	Aston Villa	7–1	West Bromwich Albion	Wellington Road
	Tommy Bowman; Fred Wheldon (2); Billy Garraty (3); Jimmy Cowan	Report
Note: 🟩

29 April 1899 Match 34	Aston Villa	5–0	Liverpool	Wellington Road
	Jack Devey (2); Billy Garraty; Jimmy Crabtree; Fred Wheldon	Report
Note: 🟩 Villa secured the title with the last match of the campaign

Source: avfchistory.co.uk

== FA Cup ==
The first round of the 1898–99 FA Cup contained sixteen ties between 32 teams. The matches were played on Saturday, 28 January 1899. Four matches were drawn, with the replays taking place in the following midweek fixture.

Tie no	Home team	Score	Away team	Date
6	Nottingham Forest	2–1	Aston Villa	28 January 1899

== Sheriff of London Charity Shield ==
Queen's Park were invited to play in the annual Sheriff of London Charity Shield, a precursor of the FA Community Shield in 1899 which pitted the best amateur and professional sides of the season against each other. They would play the Football League First Division champions Aston Villa. The amateur side was usually represented by Corinthian, however Queen's Park had defeated them 4–1 at Hampden Park earlier that year and the trophy committee decided that they deserved the honour. The match ended in a scoreless draw which saw the sides share the honour, holding the trophy for six months each.

== Birmingham Cup ==
Burslem Port Vale lost 4–0 to Aston Villa in the final.
