= Football League First Division =

Former division of football league in England

- Organising body: The Football League
- Founded: 17 April 1888
- Folded: 2004
- Country: England
- Other club from: Wales
- Number of clubs: 24 (1992–1992)
- Level on pyramid: 1 (1888–1992); 2 (1992–2004)
- Promotion to: Premier League (1992–2004)
- Relegation to: Second Division
- Domestic cup(s): FA Cup; FA Community Shield
- League cup: League Cup
- International cup(s): European Cup (1956–1985, 1991–1992); UEFA Cup Winners' Cup (1960–1985, 1990–1999); UEFA Cup (1971–1985, 1990–2004); Inter-Cities Fairs Cup (1955–1971)
- Last champions: Leeds United (1st tier) (1991–92); Norwich City (2nd tier) (2003–04)
- Most championships: Liverpool (18 titles)
- Most appearances: Peter Shilton (848)
- Top scorer: Jimmy Greaves (357)

The Football League First Division was the top division of the Football League in England from 1888 until the end of the 1991–92 season, when its teams broke away to form the Premier League. From 1992 to 2004, the name First Division was given to what had previously been called the Second Division. After the 2003–04 season, the division was renamed the Football League Championship (now EFL Championship, with the division below it called EFL League One).

The First Division contained between 12 and 24 clubs, playing each other home and away in a double round robin. The competition was based on two points for a win from 1888 until the increase to three points for a win in the year 1981.

== History ==
The Football League was founded in 1888 by Aston Villa director William McGregor. It originally consisted of a single division of 12 clubs (Accrington, Aston Villa, Blackburn Rovers, Bolton Wanderers, Burnley, Derby County, Everton, Notts County, Preston North End, Stoke (now Stoke City), West Bromwich Albion, and Wolverhampton Wanderers), known as The Football League. When the League admitted additional members from the rival Football Alliance in 1892, it was split into two divisions.

For the next 100 years, the First Division was the top professional league in English football. In 1992, the 22 clubs making up the First Division elected to resign from the Football League and set up the Premier League. The Football League was consequently re-organised, with the Second, Third, and Fourth Divisions renamed the First, Second, and Third respectively. Thus, the First Division, while still the top level of the Football League, became the second level of the entire English football league system.

The First Division was renamed the Football League Championship prior to the start of the 2004–05 season, as part of a league-wide rebrand. The Football League rebranded itself as the English Football League prior to the 2016–17 season, with its top level becoming the EFL Championship at that time.

Liverpool were the most frequent winners of the First Division when it was the top flight of English football, winning it a total of 18 times.

== Trophy and players' medals ==
The Football League First Division trophy was first awarded in 1891, and was presented to the winners through to 1992. The Football League First Division trophy was temporarily retired in 1983-84 through to 1985-86 and replaced by League sponsors Canon's very own trophy.

As of the 1947–48 season, making seven appearances for their club during the season was not enough for a player to qualify for a winners medal.

As of the 1975–76 season, players had to make 14 appearances for their club during the season in order to qualify for a winners medal.

== First Division champions ==
The Football League First Division between 1888 and 1992 was the highest tier in English football.

Football League First Division Champions
Club	Titles	Winning seasons
Liverpool	18	1900–01, 1905–06, 1921–22, 1922–23, 1946–47, 1963–64, 1965–66, 1972–73, 1975–76, 1976–77, 1978–79, 1979–80, 1981–82, 1982–83, 1983–84, 1985–86, 1987–88, 1989–90
Arsenal	10	1930–31, 1932–33, 1933–34, 1934–35, 1937–38, 1947–48, 1952–53, 1970–71, 1988–89, 1990–91
Everton	9	1890–91, 1914–15, 1927–28, 1931–32, 1938–39, 1962–63, 1969–70, 1984–85, 1986–87
Manchester United	7	1907–08, 1910–11, 1951–52, 1955–56, 1956–57, 1964–65, 1966–67
Aston Villa	7	1893–94, 1895–96, 1896–97, 1898–99, 1899–1900, 1909–10, 1980–81
Sunderland	6	1891–92, 1892–93, 1894–95, 1901–02, 1912–13, 1935–36
Newcastle United	4	1904–05, 1906–07, 1908–09, 1926–27
Sheffield Wednesday	4	1902–03, 1903–04, 1928–29, 1929–30
Huddersfield Town	3	1923–24, 1924–25, 1925–26
Wolverhampton Wanderers	3	1953–54, 1957–58, 1958–59
Leeds United	3	1968–69, 1973–74, 1991–92
Preston North End	2	1888–89, 1889–90
Blackburn Rovers	2	1911–12, 1913–14
Portsmouth	2	1948–49, 1949–50
Burnley	2	1920–21, 1959–60
Tottenham Hotspur	2	1950–51, 1960–61
Manchester City	2	1936–37, 1967–68
Derby County	2	1971–72, 1974–75
Sheffield United	1	1897–98
West Bromwich Albion	1	1919–20
Chelsea	1	1954–55
Ipswich Town	1	1961–62
Nottingham Forest	1	1977–78

From the start of the 1992–93 season, the first division became the second tier in English football. The champions would now be promoted to the Premier League. The 2003–04 season would be the last before rebranding as the Championship.

Club	Titles	Winning seasons
Sunderland	2	1995–96, 1998–99
Newcastle United	1	1992–93
Crystal Palace	1	1993–94
Middlesbrough	1	1994–95
Bolton Wanderers	1	1996–97
Nottingham Forest	1	1997–98
Charlton Athletic	1	1999–2000
Fulham	1	2000–01
Manchester City	1	2001–02
Portsmouth	1	2002–03
Norwich City	1	2003–04

== First Division all-time top scorers ==
Rank	Player	Years	Goals	Matches	Ratio	Club(s)
1	(England) Jimmy Greaves	1957–1972	357	516	0.69	Chelsea, Tottenham Hotspur, West Ham United
2	(England) Steve Bloomer	1892–1914	314	535	0.59	Derby County, Middlesbrough
3	(England) Dixie Dean	1924–1938	310	362	0.86	Everton
4	(England) Gordon Hodgson	1925–1940	288	455	0.63	Liverpool, Aston Villa, Leeds United
5	(England) Charlie Buchan	1912–1928	258	481	0.53	Sunderland, Arsenal
6	(England) David Jack	1920–1934	257	476	0.54	Bolton Wanderers, Arsenal
7	(England) Nat Lofthouse	1946–1960	255	452	0.56	Bolton Wanderers
8	(England) Joe Bradford	1921–1935	248	410	0.60	Birmingham City
9	(Scotland) Hughie Gallacher	1925–1938	246	355	0.69	Newcastle United, Chelsea, Derby County, Grimsby Town
10	(England) Joe Smith	1908–1927	243	416	0.58	Bolton Wanderers

== First Division all-time most appearances ==
Rank	Player	Years	Matches	Goals	Club(s)
1	(England) Peter Shilton	1965–1991	848	1	Leicester City, Stoke City, Nottingham Forest, Southampton, Derby County
2	(England) John Hollins	1963–1983	714	60	Chelsea, Queens Park Rangers, Arsenal
3	(England) Ray Clemence	1968–1988	710	0	Liverpool, Tottenham Hotspur
4	(Northern Ireland) Pat Jennings	1964–1985	709	0	Tottenham Hotspur, Arsenal
5	(England) Martin Peters	1961–1980	688	169	West Ham United, Tottenham Hotspur, Norwich City
6	(England) Mick Mills	1965–1985	660	25	Ipswich Town, Southampton
7	(England) Alan Ball	1962–1983	632	158	Blackpool, Everton, Arsenal, Southampton
8	(England) Stanley Matthews	1933–1965	631	67	Stoke City, Blackpool
9	(England) Steve Perryman	1969–1987	630	30	Tottenham Hotspur, Oxford United
10	(England) Ian Callaghan	1962–1978	610	49	Liverpool

== See also ==
- List of English football first tier top scorers
