= 1904–05 Aston Villa F.C. season =

English football club season

Aston Villa
1904–05 season
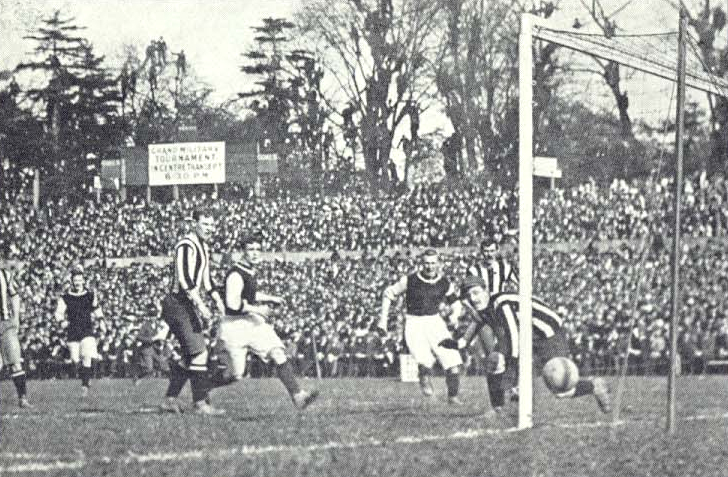
- Harry Hampton scores one of his two goals in the 1905 FA Cup Final where Aston Villa defeated Newcastle United
- President: Joseph Ansell
- Chairman: Frederick Rinder
- Manager: George Ramsay
- First Division: 4th
- FA Cup: winners

Second City Derby
- 9--0--4

The 1904–05 English football season was Aston Villa's 17th season in the Football League competing in the First Division, (Note: Up until 1992, the top division of English football was the Football League First Division. The Premier League took over from the First Division as the top tier of the English football league system upon its formation in 1992. The First Division then became the second tier of English football, the Second Division became the third tier and so on. The First Division is now known as the Football League Championship, while the Second Division is now known as Football League One.) the top flight of English football at the time. The season fell in what was to be called Villa's golden era. Aston Villa won the FA Cup competition for the fourth time, beating Newcastle United 2–0 in the final at Crystal Palace, through two goals scored by Harry Hampton. The man of the match was Aston Villa's prolific scorer Billy Garraty.

Villa won both matches in the Second City derby, 2–1 at Villa Park and 3–0 away. Events surrounding the February 1905 match away to Small Heath highlighted their Coventry Road ground's inadequacies. The official attendance was given as 28,000, though with the gates closed before kick-off, thousands scaled walls or forced entrances in order to gain admission, and the actual attendance was estimated at anything up to 35,000.

== First Division ==
Pos	Team	Pld	W	D	L	GF	GA	GAv	Pts
2	Everton	34	21	5	8	63	36	1.750	47
3	Manchester City	34	20	6	8	66	37	1.784	46
4	Aston Villa	34	19	4	11	63	43	1.465	42
5	Sunderland	34	16	8	10	60	44	1.364	40
6	Sheffield United	34	19	2	13	64	56	1.143	40

Source: World Football
Rules for classification: 1) Points; 2) Goal average; 3) Goals scored

=== Matches ===
1 September 1904	Aston Villa	1–2	Preston North End	Villa Park
	Billy Brawn (pen)	Report

3 September 1904	Aston Villa	3–0	Stoke	Villa Park
	Albert Hall; Joe Bache; (3-0)	Report

10 September 1904	Blackburn Rovers	4–0	Aston Villa	Ewood
		Report
Note: Billy George, Howard Spencer, Walter Brown, Albert Wilkes, Alex Leake, Josiah Gray, Albert Hall, Billy Brawn, Willie Clarke, Billy Garraty, Joe Bache

12 September 1904	Aston Villa	1–0	Everton	Villa Park
	Billy Brawn	Report

17 September 1904	Aston Villa	2–0	Nottingham Forest	Villa Park
	Billy Brawn; Billy Matthews	Report

24 September 1904	Sheffield Wednesday	3–2	Aston Villa	Owlerton
	Billy Matthews; Joe Bache	Report

1 October 1904	Aston Villa	2–2	Sunderland	Villa Park
	Joe Bache; Alf Wood	Report

8 October 1904	Woolwich Arsenal	1–0	Aston Villa	Manor Ground
		Report

15 October 1904	Aston Villa	0–2	Derby County	Villa Park
		Report

22 October 1904	Everton	3–2	Aston Villa	Goodison Park
	Billy Garraty; George Johnson	Report

29 October 1904	Aston Villa	2–1	Small Heath	Villa Park
	Billy Garraty; Billy Brawn (pen)	Report

9 November 1904	Manchester City	2–1	Aston Villa	Hyde Road
		Report	Arthur Lockett

12 November 1904	Aston Villa	4–2	Notts County	Villa Park
	Arthur Lockett; Jimmy Cantrell; Harry Hampton; Billy Brawn	Report

19 November 1904	Sheffield United	0–3	Aston Villa	Bramall Lane
		Report	Joe Bache; Harry Hampton; Billy Brawn (pen)

26 November 1904	Aston Villa	0–1	Newcastle United	Villa Park
		Report

3 December 1904	Preston North End	2–3	Aston Villa	Deepdale
		Report	Joe Bache; Harry Hampton; Billy Garraty

10 December 1904	Aston Villa	0–0	Middlesbrough	Villa Park
		Report

17 December 1904	Wolverhampton Wanderers	1–1	Aston Villa	Molineux
		Report	Harry Hampton

24 December 1904	Aston Villa	2–0	Bury	Villa Park
	Harry Hampton (2)	Report

26 December 1904	Aston Villa	3–1	Woolwich Arsenal	Villa Park
	Alex Leake; Harry Hampton; Albert Hall	Report

31 December 1904	Stoke	1–4	Aston Villa	Victoria Ground
		Report	Harry Hampton (2); Joe Bache; Billy Garraty

7 January 1905	Aston Villa	3–0	Blackburn Rovers	Villa Park
	Alex Leake; Billy Matthews; Joe Bache	Report

14 January 1905	Nottingham Forest	1–1	Aston Villa	City Ground
		Report	Billy Garraty

21 January 1905	Aston Villa	0–2	Sheffield Wednesday	Villa Park
		Report

28 January 1905	Sunderland	2–3	Aston Villa	Roker
		Report	Billy Brawn; Albert Hall; Joe Bache

11 February 1905	Derby County	0–2	Aston Villa	Baseball Ground
		Report	Joe Bache; Alex Leake

25 February 1905	Small Heath	0–3	Aston Villa	Muntz Street
		Report	Joe Pearson; Jack Windmill; Harry Hampton

11 March 1905	Notts County	1–2	Aston Villa	Trent Bridge
		Report	Joe Pearson; Billy Garraty

18 March 1905	Aston Villa	3–0	Sheffield United	Villa Park
	Albert Hall; Joe Bache; Harry Hampton	Report

5 April 1905	Newcastle United	2–0	Aston Villa	St James' Park
		Report

8 April 1905	Middlesbrough	3–1	Aston Villa	Ayresome Park
		Report	Albert Hall

22 April 1905	Bury	2–3	Aston Villa	Gigg Lane
		Report	Harry Hampton (2); Billy Brawn

27 April 1905	Aston Villa	3–0	Wolverhampton Wanderers	Villa Park
	Arthur Lockett; Billy Garraty; Harry Hampton	Report

29 April 1905	Aston Villa	3–2	Manchester City	Villa Park
	Albert Hall; Billy Garraty; Harry Hampton	Report
Note: Alex Leake alleged that Manchester City's Billy Meredith had offered him a £10 bribe to throw the match. Meredith was subsequently suspended by the Football Association.

Source: avfchistory.co.uk

== FA Cup ==
1905 FA Cup Final
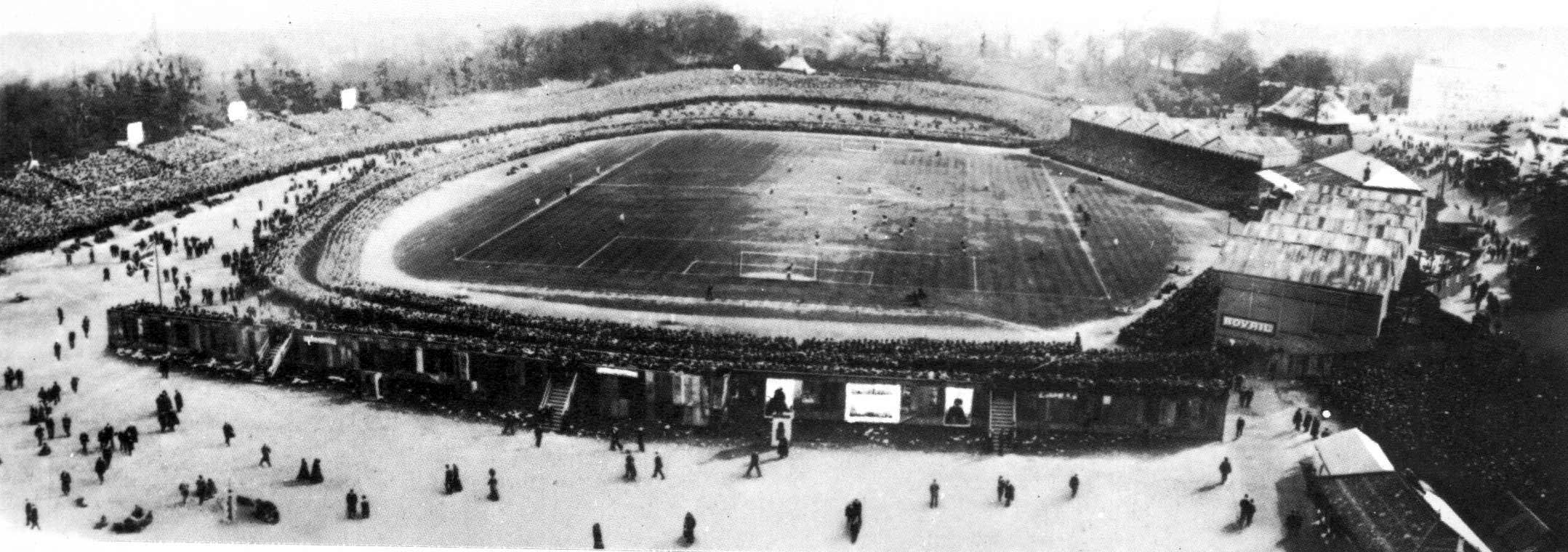
- A panoramic view of the Crystal Palace ground during the 1905 FA Cup final
- Event: 1904-05 FA Cup
Aston Villa	Newcastle United
2	0
- Date: 15 April 1905
- Venue: Crystal Palace, London
- Referee: P. R. Harrower
- Attendance: 101,117

- 🟩 4 Feb 1905, Villa 5-1 Leicester, Villa Park
- 🟩 18 Feb 1905, Villa 3-2 Bury, Villa Park
- 🟨 25 Mar 1905, Villa 1-1 Everton, Victoria Ground
- 🟩 29 Mar 1905, Villa 2-1 Everton, Trent Bridge
- 🟩 15 Apr 1905, Villa 2-0 Newcastle, Crystal Palace

== Players ==
During the season Howard Spencer and Joe Bache shared the captaincy of the club. Also known as "The Wellington Whirlwind," Harry Hampton (339) debuted as a centre forward for Aston Villa from 1904 to 1920., He scored both goals against Newcastle United in the 1905 FA Cup Final. Hampton was a prolific goalscorer. There were also debuts for Josiah Gray, Walter Brown, Jimmy Cantrell and Watty Corbett.

- (England) Billy George, 39 appearances, conceded 46
- (England) Billy Brawn, 37 appearances
- (England) Joe Bache, 37 appearances
- (England) Billy Garraty, 37 appearances
- (England) Alex Leake, 36 appearances
- (England) Freddie Miles, 35 appearances
- (England) Joe Pearson, 31 appearances
- (England) Jack Windmill, 30 appearances
- (England) Harry Hampton, 28 appearances
- (England) Albert Hall, 28 appearances
- (England) Howard Spencer, 24 appearances
- (England) Albert Wilkes, 10 appearances
- (England) Billy Matthews, 7 appearances
- (England) Alf Wood, 6 appearances
- (Scotland) Willie Clarke, 5 appearances
- (England) Albert Evans, 5 appearances
- (England) Micky Noon, 5 appearances
- (England) George Johnson, 3 appearances
- Harry Cooch, 1 appearance, conceded 2
- (Wales) Mart Watkins, 1 appearance
- Josiah Gray, 7 appearances
- Walter Brown, 11 appearances
- Jimmy Cantrell, 3 appearances
- Watty Corbett, 1 appearance

== Reserves ==
The Aston Villa Reserves won the Birmingham & District League for the third year in succession.
