= 1903–04 Aston Villa F.C. season =

English football club season

Aston Villa
1903–04 season
- Chairman: Frederick Rinder
- Manager: George Ramsay
- First Division: 5th
- FA Cup: second round

Second City Derby
- 7--0--4

The 1903–04 English football season was Aston Villa's 16th season in the Football League competing in the First Division, (Note: Up until 1992, the top division of English football was the Football League First Division. The Premier League took over from the First Division as the top tier of the English football league system upon its formation in 1992. The First Division then became the second tier of English football, the Second Division became the third tier and so on. The First Division is now known as the Football League Championship, while the Second Division is now known as Football League One.) the top flight of English football at the time. The season fell in what was to be called Villa's golden era. During the season Howard Spencer was captain of the club.

Freddie Miles (269) made his Villa debut in a 7–3 win at Nottingham Forest on 19 December 1903. During his first season at Villa he developed a good understanding with Howard Spencer.

Arthur Lockett, such a key figure in the Stoke side the previous season, signed for Villa. Jack Windmill signed from Halesowen Town making his debut on 7 November 1903 in a 3–1 home win against Newcastle United. Bert Hall scored six goals in his nine league outings in the 1903–04 season. He was noted as being a hard working outside left player who teamed up well with Joe Bache. Other debuts were Albert Hall, Mart Watkins and Billy Matthews.

In locally organised competition, Villa beat Small Heath in the first round of the Birmingham Senior Cup. Small Heath had been promoted from the Second Division the previous season. Both matches of the Second City derby ended in draws, 2-2, and 1-1.

Aston Villa had ended the previous season with nine consecutive home wins. Villa faced West Brom in the first home game of the season.

== Football League ==
| Pos | Team | Pld | W | D | L | GF | GA | GAv | Pts |
|---|---|---|---|---|---|---|---|---|---|
| 3 | Everton | 34 | 19 | 5 | 10 | 59 | 32 | 1.844 | 43 |
| 4 | Newcastle United | 34 | 18 | 6 | 10 | 58 | 45 | 1.289 | 42 |
| 5 | Aston Villa | 34 | 17 | 7 | 10 | 70 | 48 | 1.458 | 41 |
| 6 | Sunderland | 34 | 17 | 5 | 12 | 63 | 49 | 1.286 | 39 |
| 7 | Sheffield United | 34 | 15 | 8 | 11 | 62 | 57 | 1.088 | 38 |

Source: World Football
Rules for classification: 1) Points; 2) Goal average; 3) Goals scored

=== Matches ===
| Date | Opponent | Venue | Result | Notes | Scorers |
|---|---|---|---|---|---|
| 2 Sep 1903 | Newcastle | St James' | 1–1 | — | Joe Bache |
| 5 Sep 1903 | Sunderland | Roker Park | 1–6 | — | Jasper McLuckie |
| 12 Sep 1903 | Albion | Villa Park | 3–1 | — | Jasper McLuckie (2); Billy Garraty |
| 19 Sep 1903 | Small Heath | Muntz Street | 2–2 | — | Joe Pearson (pen); Billy Garraty |
| 26 Sep 1903 | Everton | Villa Park | 3–1 | — | Jasper McLuckie; Albert Wilkes; George Johnson |
| 3 Oct 1903 | Stoke | Victoria Road | 0–2 | — | — |
| 10 Oct 1903 | Derby | Villa Park | 3–0 | — | Jasper McLuckie; Joe Bache; Tommy Niblo |
| 17 Oct 1903 | Manchester City | Hyde Road | 0–1 | — | — |
| 24 Oct 1903 | Notts County | Villa Park | 4–0 | — | Jasper McLuckie; Arthur Lockett; Billy Garraty; George Johnson |
| 31 Oct 1903 | Sheffield United | Bramall Lane | 2–1 | — | Joe Bache; George Johnson |
| 7 Nov 1903 | Newcastle | Villa Park | 3–1 | — | Joe Bache (3) |
| 14 Nov 1903 | Wolves | Villa Park | 2–0 | — | Billy Garraty (2, pen) |
| 21 Nov 1903 | Boro | Ayresome | 1–2 | — | Billy Garraty (pen) |
| 28 Nov 1903 | Liverpool | Villa Park | 2–1 | — | George Johnson; Billy Brawn |
| 5 Dec 1903 | Bury | Gigg Lane | 2–2 | — | Joe Bache (2) |
| 12 Dec 1903 | Blackburn | Villa Park | 2–3 | — | Joe Bache; Jasper McLuckie |
| 19 Dec 1903 | Forest | City Ground | 7–3 | — | Albert Hall; Joe Bache (2); Tommy Niblo (2) |
| 26 Dec 1903 | Wednesday | Villa Park | 2–1 | — | Tommy Niblo; Billy Brawn |
| 28 Dec 1903 | Derby | Baseball Ground | 2–2 | — | Albert Hall (2) |
| 2 Jan 1904 | Sunderland | Villa Park | 2–0 | — | Tommy Niblo; Arthur Lockett |
| 9 Jan 1904 | Albion | Hawthorns | 3–1 | — | Joe Bache; Alf Wood; Billy Brawn (pen) |
| 16 Jan 1904 | Small Heath | Villa Park | 1–1 | — | Billy Brawn |
| 23 Jan 1904 | Everton | Goodison | 0–1 | — | — |
| 30 Jan 1904 | Stoke | Villa Park | 3–1 | — | George Harris; Mart Watkins; Own Goal |
| 13 Feb 1904 | Manchester City | Villa Park | 0–1 | — | — |
| 27 Feb 1904 | Sheffield United | Villa Park | 6–1 | — | Jasper McLuckie; Albert Hall; Billy Brawn; Alf Wood |
| 12 Mar 1904 | Wolves | Molineux | 2–3 | — | Albert Hall (2) |
| 19 Mar 1904 | Boro | Villa Park | 2–1 | — | Joe Bache (2) |
| 26 Mar 1904 | Liverpool | Anfield | 1–1 | — | Alex Leake |
| 1 Apr 1904 | Notts County | Trent Bridge | 0–0 | — | — |
| 2 Apr 1904 | Bury | Villa Park | 0–2 | — | — |
| 9 Apr 1904 | Blackburn | Ewood | 3–0 | — | Billy Matthews; Joe Pearson; Billy Garraty |
| 16 Apr 1904 | Forest | Villa Park | 3–1 | — | Billy Matthews; Billy Garraty; Billy Brawn |
| 23 Apr 1904 | Wednesday | Owlerton | 2–4 | — | Billy Matthews; Billy Garraty |

Source: avfchistory.co.uk

== Players ==
- (England) Billy Brawn, 34 appearances
- (England) Alf Wood, 31 appearances
- (England) Alex Leake, 30 appearances
- (England) Joe Bache, 29 appearances
- (England) Arthur Lockett, 27 appearances
- (England) Billy George, 27 appearances, conceded 41
- (England) Howard Spencer, 25 appearances
- (England) Joe Pearson, 25 appearances
- (England) Albert Wilkes, 20 appearances
- (England) Billy Garraty, 18 appearances
- (Scotland) Tommy Niblo, 18 appearances
- (England) Albert Evans, 15 appearances
- (Scotland) Jasper McLuckie, 15 appearances
- (England) George Johnson, 13 appearances
- (England) Micky Noon, 12 appearances
- Harry Cooch, 9 appearances, conceded 10
- (Scotland) Willie Clarke, 2 appearances
- (England) George Harris, 2 appearances
- (England) Jack Shutt, 1 appearance
- (England) Jack Windmill, 1 appearance
- (England) Freddie Miles, 17 appearances
- (England) Albert Hall, 11 appearances
- (Wales) Mart Watkins, 5 appearances
- (England) Billy Matthews, 8 appearances

== See also ==
- List of Aston Villa F.C. records and statistics
