= 1901–02 Aston Villa F.C. season =

English football club season

Aston Villa
1901–02 season
- President: Joseph Ansell
- Chairman: Frederick Rinder
- Manager: George Ramsay
- First Division: 8th
- FA Cup: first round

Second City Derby
- 7--0--2

The 1901–02 English football season was Aston Villa's 14th season in the Football League, competing in the First Division, (Note: Up until 1992, the top division of English football was the Football League First Division. The Premier League took over from the First Division as the top tier of the English football league system upon its formation in 1992. The First Division then became the second tier of English football, the Second Division became the third tier and so on. The First Division is now known as the Football League Championship, while the Second Division is now known as Football League One.) the top flight in English football at the time. The season fell in what was to be called Villa's golden era.

On Wednesday 25 December 1901, Villa won 3–2 away to Everton in front of a crowd of 18,000 at Goodison Park. Villa scorer, Willie Clarke (41) became the first non-white player to score in the English First Division.

During the season Joe Bache (431), and Jimmy Crabtree (176) shared the captaincy of the club. Knee and ankle injuries induced Howard Spencer (258) to take the season off for twelve months rest.

The previous season Small Heath had finished runners-up in Second Division, so were promoted to the First Division for 1901–02. Villa won 2–0 at Coventry Road Muntz Street with goals by Bache and Jack Devey (268). In the 1901 Boxing Day fixture, Villa's Jasper McLuckie (57) was the only scorer. At the end of the season Small Heath were relegated back to the Second Division. In locally organised competition, Small Heath lost to Villa in the first round of the Birmingham Senior Cup.

There were debuts for Willie Clarke, George Smith, George Harris, George Shutt, Tom Perry, Billy Marriott, Jasper McLuckie, Billy Brawn, Tommy Niblo, Bert Banks (5) and Harry Cooch.

== League ==
Pos	Team	Pld	W	D	L	GF	GA	GAv	Pts
6	Derby County	34	13	9	12	39	41	0.951	35
7	Bury	34	13	8	13	44	38	1.158	34
8	Aston Villa	34	13	8	13	42	40	1.050	34
9	The Wednesday	34	13	8	13	48	52	0.923	34
10	Sheffield United	34	13	7	14	53	48	1.104	33

Source: World Football
Rules for classification: 1) Points; 2) Goal average; 3) Goals scored

=== Matches ===
7 September 1901	Bury	0–0	Aston Villa	Gigg Lane
		Report
Note: https://www.avfchistory.co.uk/aston-villa/matches/league/1901-02

9 September 1901	Aston Villa	2–0	Notts County	Villa Park
	Joe Bache; Billy Garraty	Report
Note: As in the last match Villa play in thin cotton red shirts due to the warm weather.

14 September 1901	Aston Villa	1–1	Blackburn	Villa Park
	Joe Bache	Report

16 September 1901	Aston Villa	1–2	Sheffield United	Villa Park
	Albert Wilkes	Report

21 September 1901	Stoke	1–0	Aston Villa	Victoria Ground
		Report

28 September 1901	Aston Villa	1–1	Everton	Villa Park
	Joe Bache	Report

5 October 1901	Sunderland	1–0	Aston Villa	Roker Park
		Report

12 October 1901	Small Heath	0–2	Aston Villa	Muntz Street
		Report	Jack Devey; Joe Bache

19 October 1901	Derby County	1–0	Aston Villa	Baseball Ground
		Report

26 October 1901	Aston Villa	4–1	The Wednesday	Villa Park
	Jasper McLuckie (2); Joe Bache; Bobby Templeton	Report

2 November 1901	Notts County	0–3	Aston Villa	Trent Bridge
		Report	Jasper McLuckie (2); Billy Garraty

9 November 1901	Aston Villa	1–0	Bolton Wanderers	Villa Park
	Jasper McLuckie	Report

23 November 1901	Aston Villa	2–1	Wolverhampton Wanderers	Villa Park
	Jasper McLuckie (2)	Report

30 November 1901	Liverpool	1–0	Aston Villa	Anfield
		Report

7 December 1901	Aston Villa	0–0	Newcastle United	Villa Park
		Report

14 December 1901	Aston Villa	4–1	Grimsby	Villa Park
	Jack Devey; Jasper McLuckie (2)	Report

25 December 1901	Everton	2–3	Aston Villa	Goodison Park
		Report	Billy Garraty; Alf Wood; Willie Clarke
Note: Willie Clarke became the first black player to score in the English First Division.

26 December 1901	Aston Villa	1–0	Small Heath	Villa Park
	Jasper McLuckie	Report

28 December 1901	Aston Villa	3–0	Nottingham Forest	Villa Park
	Billy Garraty; Willie Clarke; Jasper McLuckie	Report

1 January 1902	Sheffield United	6–0	Aston Villa	Bramall Lane
		Report

4 January 1902	Aston Villa	2–0	Bury	Villa Park
	Jasper McLuckie; Willie Clarke	Report

11 January 1902	Blackburn	4–0	Aston Villa	Ewood Park
		Report

18 January 1902	Aston Villa	0–0	Stoke	Villa Park
		Report

1 February 1902	Aston Villa	0–1	Sunderland	Villa Park
		Report

15 February 1902	Aston Villa	3–2	Derby County	Villa Park
	Tom Perry; Joe Bache; Alf Wood	Report

17 February 1902	Manchester City	1–0	Aston Villa	Hyde Road
		Report

22 February 1902	Sheffield Wednesday	1–0	Aston Villa	Owlerton
		Report

8 March 1902	Bolton Wanderers	2–2	Aston Villa	Burnden Park
		Report	Jasper McLuckie; George Johnson

22 March 1902	Wolverhampton Wanderers	0–2	Aston Villa	Molineux
		Report	Jasper McLuckie; Joe Bache

29 March 1902	Aston Villa	0–1	Liverpool	Villa Park
		Report

31 March 1902	Aston Villa	2–2	Manchester City	Villa Park
	Jasper McLuckie; George Johnson	Report

1 April 1902	Nottingham Forest	1–1	Aston Villa	City Ground
		Report	Tommy Niblo

5 April 1902	Newcastle United	2–1	Aston Villa	St James' Park
		Report	Tommy Niblo

12 April 1902	Grimsby	4–1	Aston Villa	Blundell Park
		Report	Joe Bache
Note: https://www.avfchistory.co.uk/aston-villa/matches/league/1901-02

Source: avfchistory.co.uk

== FA Cup ==
The first round proper contained sixteen ties between 32 teams. 17 of the 18 First Division sides were exempt to this round, as were West Bromwich Albion, Middlesbrough and Preston North End from the Second Division, and Southern League sides Southampton and Tottenham Hotspur, finalists in the two previous seasons. They joined the ten teams who won in the intermediate round.

The matches were played on Saturday 25 January 1902. Seven matches were drawn, with the replays taking place in the following midweek. Two of these then went to a second replay the following week.

Tie no	Home team	Score	Away team	Date
3	Stoke	2–2	Aston Villa	25 January 1902
Replay	Aston Villa	1–2	Stoke	29 January 1902

== Players ==
- (England) Joe Bache, 35 appearances
- (England) Alf Wood, 35 appearances
- (England) Jimmy Crabtree, 31 appearances
- (England) Albert Wilkes, 31 appearances
- (England) Billy Garraty, 28 appearances
- (England) Billy George, 27 appearances, conceded 30
- (Scotland) Bobby Templeton, 26 appearances
- (England) Jack Shutt, 26 appearances
- (England) Tom Perry, 25 appearances
- (Scotland) Jasper McLuckie, 23 appearances
- (Scotland) Willie Clarke, 16 appearances
- (Scotland) Tommy Niblo, 14 appearances
- (England) Micky Noon, 10 appearances
- (Scotland) Arthur Millar, 9 appearances
- (England) George Johnson, 8 appearances
- (England) Jack Whitley, 8 appearances, conceded 12
- (England) Billy Marriott, 8 appearances
- (Scotland) Bert Banks, 5 appearances
- (England) Joe Pearson, 5 appearances
- (England) George Smith, 5 appearances
- (England) Jack Devey, 4 appearances
- (England) Albert Evans, 4 appearances
- (England) Tommy Wilson, 4 appearances
- (England) Frank Lloyd, 3 appearances
- (England) George Harris, 3 appearances
- (England) Billy Brawn, 1 appearance
- Harry Cooch, 1 appearance, conceded 2
- (Scotland) Jimmy Cowan, 1 appearance
- (Scotland) Jimmy Murray, 1 appearance
