= 1902–03 Aston Villa F.C. season =

English football club season

Aston Villa
1902–03 season
- President: Joseph Ansell
- Chairman: Frederick Rinder
- Manager: George Ramsay
- First Division: 2nd
- FA Cup: Semi-finals

The 1902–03 English football season was Aston Villa's 15th season in the Football League competing in the First Division, (Note: Up until 1992, the top division of English football was the Football League First Division. The Premier League took over from the First Division as the top tier of the English football league system upon its formation in 1992. The First Division then became the second tier of English football, the Second Division became the third tier and so on. The First Division is now known as the Football League Championship, while the Second Division is now known as Football League One.) the then top flight of English football. The season fell in what was to be called Villa's golden era.

The Club had nine consecutive home wins to end the season: In Villa's first home game of 1903 they beat Forest 3–1. Two weeks later they beat Blackburn 5–0 at home. The next home tie was in the FA Cup with Villa beating Sunderland 4–1. In February Villa beat Barnsley 4–1, also a home tie in the FA Cup. April 1903 saw five home fixtures for Villa. They won all five.

Aston Villa Reserves won the Walsall Senior Cup in 1903.

== League ==
Pos	Team	Pld	W	D	L	GF	GA	GAv	Pts
1	The Wednesday (C)	34	19	4	11	54	36	1.500	42
2	Aston Villa	34	19	3	12	61	40	1.525	41
3	Sunderland	34	16	9	9	51	36	1.417	41
4	Sheffield United	34	17	5	12	58	44	1.318	39
5	Liverpool	34	17	4	13	68	49	1.388	38

Source: World Football
Rules for classification: 1) Points; 2) Goal average; 3) Goals scored
(C) Champions

=== Matches ===
6 September 1902	Aston Villa	0–0	Derby County	Villa Park
		Report

13 September 1902	Nottingham Forest	2–0	Aston Villa	City Ground
		Report

20 September 1902	Aston Villa	2–2	Bury	Villa Park
	Joe Bache; George Johnson	Report

27 September 1902	Blackburn	0–2	Aston Villa	Ewood Park
		Report	Joe Bache; George Johnson

4 October 1902	Aston Villa	0–1	Sunderland	Villa Park
		Report

11 October 1902	Stoke	1–0	Aston Villa	Victoria Ground
		Report

18 October 1902	Aston Villa	2–1	Everton	Villa Park
	Billy Garraty; Michael Noon	Report

1 November 1902	Aston Villa	0–3	West Bromwich Albion	Villa Park
		Report

8 November 1902	Notts County	2–1	Aston Villa	Trent Bridge
		Report	Billy Garraty

15 November 1902	Aston Villa	4–2	Bolton Wanderers	Villa Park
	Joe Bache; Albert Wilkes; Billy Garraty (2)	Report

22 November 1902	Middlesbrough	1–2	Aston Villa	Linthorpe Road
		Report	Willie Clarke; Own Goal

29 November 1902	Aston Villa	7–0	Newcastle United	Villa Park
	Joe Bache (2); Alex Leake; Bobby Templeton; George Johnson (2); Own Goal	Report

6 December 1902	Wolverhampton Wanderers	2–1	Aston Villa	Molineux
		Report	Joe Bache

13 December 1902	Aston Villa	1–2	Liverpool	Villa Park
	Joe Bache	Report

20 December 1902	Sheffield United	2–4	Aston Villa	Bramall Lane
		Report	Jasper McLuckie; Bobby Templeton; Billy Garraty; 4–1

26 December 1902	Aston Villa	1–0	The Wednesday	Villa Park
	Billy Garraty (pen)	Report

27 December 1902	Aston Villa	2–2	Grimsby	Villa Park
	Billy Garraty (1–1, 2–2)	Report

1 January 1903	Sheffield Wednesday	4–0	Aston Villa	Owlerton
		Report

3 January 1903	Derby County	2–0	Aston Villa	Baseball Ground
		Report

10 January 1903	Aston Villa	3–1	Nottingham Forest	Villa Park
	Billy Garraty (2); Jasper McLuckie	Report

17 January 1903	Bury	0–1	Aston Villa	Gigg Lane
		Report	Jasper McLuckie

24 January 1903	Aston Villa	5–0	Blackburn	Villa Park
	Billy Brawn; Tommy Niblo; Jasper McLuckie; Billy Garraty	Report

31 January 1903	Sunderland	1–0	Aston Villa	Roker Park
		Report

14 February 1903	Everton	0–1	Aston Villa	Goodison Park
		Report	Joe Bache

28 February 1903	West Bromwich Albion	1–2	Aston Villa	The Hawthorns
		Report	Jasper McLuckie; Alf Wood

14 March 1903	Bolton Wanderers	0–1	Aston Villa	Burnden Park
		Report	George Johnson

28 March 1903	Newcastle United	2–0	Aston Villa	St James' Park
		Report

4 April 1903	Aston Villa	3–1	Wolverhampton Wanderers	Villa Park
	Jasper McLuckie; Billy Garraty; George Johnson	Report

11 April 1903	Liverpool	2–1	Aston Villa	Anfield
		Report	Billy Garraty (pen)

13 April 1903	Aston Villa	2–0	Stoke	Villa Park
	Willie Clarke; Alex Leake	Report

15 April 1903	Aston Villa	2–1	Notts County	Villa Park
	Jasper McLuckie; Billy Brawn (pen)	Report

18 April 1903	Aston Villa	4–2	Sheffield United	Villa Park
	Jasper McLuckie (3); Billy Garraty	Report

25 April 1903	Grimsby	0–2	Aston Villa	Blundell Park
		Report	Jasper McLuckie (2)

27 April 1903	Aston Villa	5–0	Middlesbrough	Villa Park
	Willie Clarke; Jasper McLuckie; Alex Leake; Alf Wood; George Johnson	Report

Source: avfchistory.co.uk

== FA Cup ==
First round

The first round proper contained 16 ties between 32 teams. 17 of the 18 First Division sides were given a bye to this round, as were Manchester City and Small Heath from the Second Division, and Southern League teams Southampton, Portsmouth, and Tottenham Hotspur. They joined the ten teams who won in the intermediate round.

The matches were played on Saturday, 7 February 1903. Four matches were drawn, with the replays taking place in the following midweek. One of these, the Notts County v Southampton match, went to a second replay, which Notts County won at Small Heath's St Andrew's ground.

Tie no	Home team	Score	Away team	Date
6	Aston Villa	4–1	Sunderland	7 February 1903

Second round

The eight Second Round matches were played on Saturday, 21 February 1903. There was one replay, between Nottingham Forest and Stoke City, played in the following midweek.

Tie no	Home team	Score	Away team	Date
2	Aston Villa	4–1	Barnsley	21 February 1903

Third round

The four Third Round matches were played on Saturday 7 March 1903. There were no replays.

Tie no	Home team	Score	Away team	Date
4	Tottenham Hotspur	2–3	Aston Villa	7 March 1903

Semi-finals

The semi-final matches were played at neutral venues on Saturday 21 March 1903. Bury and Derby County won and went on to meet each other in the final.

21 March 1903
15:00

Bury	3–0	Aston Villa

Goodison Park, Liverpool

== Birmingham Cup ==
Aston Villa beat West Bromwich Albion 3–0 in the final to lift the Cup for the twelfth time.

== Players ==
During the season Howard Spencer and Albert Evans shared the captaincy of the club. Spencer returned, having taken the 1901–02 season off in order to rest his knee and ankle for twelve months in the hope of recovering from an injury. Billy Garraty, great-great-grandfather of Jack Grealish, made 30 appearances during the season.

Alex Leake joined Aston Villa from Small Heath in July 1902, when he was 31, and stayed five years. In a 1901 profile in the Daily Express, C.B. Fry wrote:

Leake is one of the best half-backs of the day; he is a character, and very popular. Fast, with exceptional stamina, he is on the go all the game through; yet never tires.

Other debuts were Arthur Lockett, Albert Fisher, Oscar Evans, and Harry Griffin.

- (England) Alf Wood, 35 appearances
- (England) Billy George, 33 appearances, conceded 35
- (England) Alex Leake, 32 appearances
- (England) Howard Spencer, 31 appearances
- (England) Billy Garraty, 30 appearances
- (England) Joe Bache, 28 appearances
- (Scotland) Jasper McLuckie, 24 appearances
- (England) George Johnson, 24 appearances
- (Scotland) Tommy Niblo, 21 appearances
- (England) Albert Wilkes, 21 appearances
- (England) Billy Brawn, 20 appearances
- (Scotland) Willie Clarke, 20 appearances
- (England) Micky Noon, 20 appearances
- (England) Albert Evans, 18 appearances
- (England) Joe Pearson, 17 appearances
- (England) Jack Shutt, 15 appearances
- (Scotland) Bobby Templeton, 11 appearances
- Harry Cooch, 5 appearances, conceded 12
- (England) George Harris, 4 appearances
- (England) Tom Perry, 4 appearances
- NEW Harry Griffin, 1 appearance
- NEW Albert Fisher, 1 appearance
- Oscar Evans, 2 appearances
- NEW Arthur Lockett, 1 appearances

== Reserves ==
The Aston Villa Reserves were champions of the Birmingham & District League.
