= 1900–01 Aston Villa F.C. season =

English football club season

Aston Villa
1900–01 season
- President: Joseph Ansell
- Chairman: Frederick Rinder
- Manager: George Ramsay
- First Division: 15th
- FA Cup: Semi-finals
Home colours	Away colours

The 1900–01 English football season was Aston Villa's 13th season in the Football League, competing in the First Division, (Note: Up until 1992, the top division of English football was the Football League First Division. The Premier League took over from the First Division as the top tier of the English football league system upon its formation in 1992. The First Division then became the second tier of English football, the Second Division became the third tier and so on. The First Division is now known as the Football League Championship, while the Second Division is now known as Football League One.) the top flight of English football at the time. The season fell in what was to be called Villa's golden era. During the season Jimmy Crabtree, Jack Devey, and Howard Spencer shared the captaincy of the club. Billy Garraty, great-great-grandfather of Jack Grealish, made the most appearances during the season. Goalkeeper & first-class cricketer, Billy George was next with 39 appearances.

Second Division Small Heath F.C. took part in the 1900–01 FA Cup, entering at the first round proper and losing in the third round to Aston Villa after a replay, Villa's Billy Garraty being the sole scorer over the two fixtures. Small Heath also lost to Villa in the semi-final of the Lord Mayor of Birmingham's Charity Cup.

On 1 December 1900, Villa recorded the biggest home win in the League that season, 7–1 against Manchester City in front of a crowd of 12,000. When Aston Villa played away at Stoke on 29 December 1900, the home club registered its biggest home attendance of the season.

There were debuts for Arthur Millar, Joe Pearson, Albert Brown, Joe Bache, Frank Lloyd, Alf Wood, Jimmy Murray, Tom Gilson, Jack Whitley, Tommy Wilson and Willie McAulay (4).

== Football League ==
Pos	Team	Pld	W	D	L	GF	GA	GAv	Pts	Relegation
13	Wolverhampton Wanderers	34	9	13	12	39	55	0.709	31	
14	Sheffield United	34	12	7	15	35	52	0.673	31	
15	Aston Villa	34	10	10	14	45	51	0.882	30	
16	Stoke	34	11	5	18	46	57	0.807	27	
17	Preston North End (R)	34	9	7	18	49	75	0.653	25	Relegation to the Second Division

Source: World Football
Rules for classification: 1) Points; 2) Goal average; 3) Goals scored
(R) Relegated

=== Matches ===
1 September 1900 1	Aston Villa	2–0	Stoke	Villa Park
	Charlie Athersmith; Steve Smith	Report

3 September 1900 2	Aston Villa	4–0	Preston	Villa Park
	Jack Devey (3); Billy Garraty	Report

8 September 1900 3	West Bromwich Albion	0–1	Aston Villa	The Hawthorns
		Report	George Johnson

10 September 1900 4	Aston Villa	1–0	Bury	Villa Park
	Jack Devey	Report

15 September 1900 5	Aston Villa	1–2	Everton	Villa Park
	Jack Devey	Report

22 September 1900 6	Sunderland	0–0	Aston Villa	Roker Park
		Report

29 September 1900 7	Aston Villa	2–1	Derby County	Villa Park
	Jack Devey (2)	Report

6 October 1900 8	Bolton Wanderers	1–0	Aston Villa	Burnden Park
		Report
Note: Billy George, Jimmy Cowan, Charlie Aston, Albert Wilkes, Jimmy Crabtree, Tommy Bowman, Bobby Templeton, Charlie Athersmith, Billy Garraty, George Johnson, Willie McAulay

13 October 1900 9	Aston Villa	1–2	Notts County	Villa Park
	George Johnson	Report

20 October 1900 10	Preston	0–2	Aston Villa	Deepdale
		Report	Steve Smith; Billy Garraty

27 October 1900 11	Aston Villa	0–0	Wolverhampton Wanderers	Villa Park
		Report

29 October 1900 12	Aston Villa	3–3	Blackburn Rovers	Villa Park
	Charlie Athersmith (2); Bobby Templeton	Report

3 November 1900 13	Sheffield Wednesday	3–2	Aston Villa	Owlerton
		Report	Billy Garraty; George Johnson

10 November 1900 14	Liverpool	5–1	Aston Villa	Anfield
		Report	George Johnson

17 November 1900 15	Aston Villa	2–2	Newcastle United	Villa Park
	Albert Wilkes; George Johnson	Report

24 November 1900 16	Sheffield United	2–2	Aston Villa	Bramall Lane
	Albert Brown (2)	Report

1 December 1900 17	Aston Villa	7–1	Manchester City	Villa Park
	Jack Devey; Albert Wilkes; Billy Garraty; George Johnson (4)	Report

8 December 1900 18	Bury	3–1	Aston Villa	Gigg Lane
		Report	Steve Smith

15 December 1900 19	Aston Villa	2–1	Nottingham Forest	Villa Park
	Jack Devey (2)	Report

22 December 1900 20	Blackburn Rovers	2–2	Aston Villa	Ewood Park
		Report	Steve Smith; Billy Garraty
Note: CB Jimmy Cowan, W Charlie Athersmith, W Steve Smith, FB Howard Spencer, GK Billy George, Albert Wilkes, Jimmy Crabtree, Tommy Bowman, Billy Garraty, George Johnson, Jack Devey

26 December 1900 21	Aston Villa	3–0	Bolton Wanderers	Villa Park
	Jack Devey (2); Charlie Athersmith	Report

29 December 1900 22	Stoke	0–0	Aston Villa	Victoria Ground
		Report		Attendance: 12,000
Note: Tommy Bowman and Jimmy Cowan were rested. A point at Stoke leaves Villa in second at the start of the year, but, even winning every remaining match, last season's points tally is no longer achievable.

5 January 1901 23	Aston Villa	0–1	West Bromwich Albion	Villa Park
		Report

12 January 1901 24	Everton	2–1	Aston Villa	Goodison Park
		Report	Billy Garraty

19 January 1901 25	Aston Villa	2–2	Sunderland	Villa Park
	Jack Devey; Billy Garraty	Report

16 February 1901 26	Notts County	2–0	Aston Villa	Trent Bridge
		Report

9 March 1901 27	Aston Villa	2–1	Sheffield Wednesday	Villa Park
	Billy Garraty; Frank Lloyd	Report

16 March 1901 28	Aston Villa	0–2	Liverpool	Villa Park
		Report

30 March 1901 29	Aston Villa	0–0	Sheffield United	Villa Park
		Report

8 April 1901 30	Wolverhampton Wanderers	0–0	Aston Villa	Molineux
		Report

17 April 1901 31	Newcastle United	3–0	Aston Villa	St James' Park
		Report

20 April 1901 32	Nottingham Forest	3–1	Aston Villa	City Ground
		Report	Joe Bache

22 April 1901 33	Derby County	3–0	Aston Villa	Baseball Ground
		Report

27 April 1901 34	Manchester City	4–0	Aston Villa	Hyde Road
		Report

Source: avfchistory.co.uk

== FA Cup ==
9 February 1901 First round	Aston Villa	5–0	Millwall Athletic	Villa Park
		Report
Note: The first round proper contained sixteen ties between 32 teams. Villa was one of the 16 of 18 Football League First Division sides were given a bye to this round, as were Small Heath, Burnley and Leicester Fosse of the Second Division and Southern League First Division clubs Southampton, Millwall Athletic and Tottenham Hotspur. They joined the ten teams who won in the intermediate round. The matches were played on Saturday 9 February 1901.

Second round

The eight Second Round matches were scheduled for Saturday 23 February 1901. There was one replay, between Aston Villa and Nottingham Forest, played in the following midweek.

Tie no	Home team	Score	Away team	Date
2	Aston Villa	0–0	Nottingham Forest	23 February 1901
Replay	Nottingham Forest	1–3	Aston Villa	27 February 1901

Third round

The four Third Round matches were scheduled for Saturday, 23 March 1901. Two replays were needed, played in the following midweek.

Second City Derby
- 5--0--2

Tie no	Home team	Score	Away team	Date
4	Small Heath	0–0	Aston Villa	23 March 1901
Replay	Aston Villa	1–0	Small Heath	27 March 1901

=== Semi-finals ===
The semi-final matches were both intended to be played on Saturday 6 April 1901. Sheffield United and Aston Villa played on this date, but drew their tie and had to replay it five days later; this next match finished in a 3–0 win for United. The other game, Tottenham Hotspur against West Bromwich Albion, was delayed until Monday 8 April and finished in a convincing win for Spurs.

6 April 1901
15:00

Sheffield United	2–2	Aston Villa

City Ground, Nottingham

Replay

11 April 1901
15:00

Sheffield United	3–0	Aston Villa

Baseball Ground, Derby

== Players ==
- (England) Billy Garraty, 41 appearances
- (England) Billy George, 39 appearances, conceded 27
- (England) Steve Smith, 36 appearances
- (England) Jack Devey, 33 appearances
- (England) Albert Evans, 33 appearances
- (Scotland) Jimmy Cowan, 30 appearances
- (England) Charlie Athersmith, 32 appearances
- (England) Howard Spencer, 21 appearances
- (England) Jimmy Crabtree, 32 appearances
- (Scotland) Tommy Bowman, 31 appearances
- (England) George Johnson, 25 appearances
- (England) Charlie Aston, 6 appearances
- (England) Albert Wilkes, 31 appearances
- (Scotland) Bobby Templeton, 20 appearances
- (England) Chris Mann, 3 appearances
- (England) Micky Noon, 13 appearances
- (Scotland) Willie McAulay, 6 appearances
- (England) Joe Pearson, 6 appearances
- (England) Albert Brown, 2 appearances
- (England) Joe Bache, 7 appearances
- (England) Frank Lloyd, 3 appearances
- (England) Alf Wood, 4 appearances
- (Scotland) Jimmy Murray, 1 appearance
- (England) Tom Gilson, 2 appearances
- (England) Jack Whitley, 3 appearances, conceded 10
- (England) Tommy Wilson, 1 appearance
- (Scotland) Arthur Millar, 1 appearance
