= George Harris =

George Harris may refer to:

== Arts and entertainment ==
- George Harris (barrister) (1809–1890), English writer
- George Washington Harris (1814–1869), American writer and humorist
- George Frederick Harris (painter) (1856–1924), Welsh portrait and landscape painter
- George Albert Harris (1913–1991), American painter, muralist, and lithographer
- George Harris (actor) (born 1949), British film, television, and stage actor
- Hibiscus (entertainer) (George Harris, Jr., 1949–1982), American war protester, then actor
- George Harris, a character in Uncle Tom's Cabin

== Military ==
- George Harris, 1st Baron Harris (1746–1829), British general
- George W. Harris (1835–1920s), American Civil War soldier and Medal of Honor recipient

== Politics ==
- George Harris, 3rd Baron Harris (1810–1872), governor of Trinidad
- George E. Harris (1827–1911), United States representative from Mississippi
- George Harris (Queensland politician) (1831–1891), member of the Queensland Legislative Council, Australia
- George Harris, 4th Baron Harris (1851–1932), English cricketer and politician
- George Chesley Harris (1879–1954), merchant and politician in Newfoundland

== Religion ==
- George Harris (Unitarian) (1794–1859), English Unitarian minister in Scotland
- George Harris (theologian) (1844–1922), American theologian and academic administrator
- George Clinton Harris (1925–2000), bishop of the Episcopal Diocese of Alaska

== Science and medicine ==
- George Prideaux Robert Harris (1775–1810), Australian naturalist
- George Harris (physician) (1856–1931), Inspector General of Civil Hospitals in the Punjab, United Provinces and Bengal
- George Frederick Harris (geologist) (1862–1906), English palaeontologist
- George Harris (philosopher) (born 1947), American philosopher

== Sports ==
=== Association football ===
- George Harris (footballer, born 1875) (1875–1910), English-born footballer for Aston Villa, Wolves and Grimsby Town
- George Harris (footballer, born 1877) (1877–?), English-born footballer for Stoke and Southampton
- George Harris (footballer, born 1878) (1878–1923), English footballer for Aston Villa and West Bromwich Albion
- George Harris (footballer, born 1940) (1940–2022), English-born footballer for Watford and Reading
- George Harris (soccer, born 1949) (born 1948), Australian former football (soccer) player

=== Cricket ===
- George Harris, 4th Baron Harris (1851–1932), English cricketer and politician
- George Harris (cricketer, born 1880) (1880–1954), English cricketer
- George Harris (cricketer, born 1904) (1904–1988), English cricketer
- George Harris (cricketer, born 1906) (1906–1994), English cricketer

=== Other sports ===
- George Harris (Australian footballer) (1902–1981), Australian rules footballer
- George Harris (Carlton president) (1922–2007), Australian football club president
- George Harris (wrestler) (1927–2002), American wrestler and wrestling manager
- George Harris (judoka) (1933–2011), American judoka
- Duke Harris (George Francis Harris, 1942–2017), Canadian ice hockey player
- George Harris (baseball), American baseball player
- Lloyd Harris (tennis) (Lloyd George Harris, born 1997), South African tennis player

== Others ==
- George P. Harris (c. 1820–1873), co-founder of Australian retailer Harris Scarfe
- George Delancey Harris (1892–1958), American business executive
- George Bernard Harris (1901–1983), United States federal judge
