= 1906–07 Aston Villa F.C. season =

English football club season

Aston Villa
1906–07 season
- President: Joseph Ansell
- Chairman: Frederick Rinder
- Manager: George Ramsay
- First Division: 5th
- FA Cup: Second round

Second City Derby
- 10--3--4

The 1906–07 English football season was Aston Villa's 19th season in the Football League competing in the First Division, (Note: Up until 1992, the top division of English football was the Football League First Division. The Premier League took over from the First Division as the top tier of the English football league system upon its formation in 1992. The First Division then became the second tier of English football, the Second Division became the third tier and so on. The First Division is now known as the Football League Championship, while the Second Division is now known as Football League One.) the top flight of English football at the time. The season fell in what was to be called Villa's golden era. Club crests did not always hold their current importance. In the case of Aston Villa Football Club, while the rampant lion was associated with the club from near its inception in 1874, the earliest known crest, the Lion Rampant To dexter (facing left) on a shield with motto "Prepared", was first documented in the club program of 1 September 1906.

Villa signed Bobby Evans in the summer of 1906 for a fee of £30 from Wrexham-the Welsh club then playing in the Birmingham and District League. While at Villa Evans continued to add to his tally of Welsh caps. In the Second City Derby, both teams won their home fixtures.

Aston Villa started the new year with a 0–1 defeat to Manchester United. The following month they recorded their biggest victory of the season beating Sheffield Wednesday 8–1.

There debuts for Chris Buckley, Bobby Evans (16), Frederick Chapple, Alec Logan and George Tranter.

== Football League ==
Pos	Team	Pld	W	D	L	GF	GA	GAv	Pts
3	Everton	38	20	5	13	70	46	1.522	45
4	Sheffield United	38	17	11	10	57	55	1.036	45
5	Aston Villa	38	19	6	13	78	52	1.500	44
6	Bolton Wanderers	38	18	8	12	59	47	1.255	44
7	Woolwich Arsenal	38	20	4	14	66	59	1.119	44

Source: World Football
Rules for classification: 1) Points; 2) Goal average; 3) Goals scored

=== Matches ===
1 September 1906	Aston Villa	4–2	Blackburn Rovers	Villa Park
	Joe Bache (9'); Harry Hampton (69'); Joe Walters (73'); Jimmy Cantrell (80')	Report

3 September 1906	Stoke	0–2	Aston Villa	Victoria Ground
		Report	Harry Hampton (20' pen)

8 September 1906	Sunderland	2–1	Aston Villa	Roker Park
		Report	Joe Bache (10')

10 September 1906	Aston Villa	1–0	Stoke	Villa Park
	Albert Hall (75')	Report

15 September 1906	Aston Villa	4–1	Birmingham	Villa Park
	Samuel Greenhalgh (41'); Albert Hall (2–0); Joe Walters (71'); Harry Hampton (83' pen)

22 September 1906	Everton	1–2	Aston Villa	Goodison Park
			Harry Hampton (30'); Billy Garraty (57')

29 September 1906	Aston Villa	2–2	Arsenal	Villa Park
	Harry Hampton (10'); Joe Bache (60')

6 October 1906	Wednesday	2–1	Aston Villa	Owlerton Stadium
			Harry Hampton (67')

13 October 1906	Aston Villa	3–1	Bury	Villa Park
	Charlie Millington (2'); Billy Matthews (5'); Joe Walters (81')

20 October 1906	Manchester City	4–2	Aston Villa	Hyde Road
			Joe Bache (13'); Albert Hall (62')

27 October 1906	Aston Villa	2–3	Middlesbrough	Villa Park
	Harry Hampton (49', 55')

3 November 1906	Preston North End	2–0	Aston Villa	Deepdale

10 November 1906	Aston Villa	0–0	Newcastle United	Villa Park

17 November 1906	Derby County	0–1	Aston Villa	Baseball Ground
			Billy Garraty (0–1)

24 November 1906	Liverpool	5–2	Aston Villa	Anfield
			Joe Walters (1'); Albert Hall (5–2)

1 December 1906	Aston Villa	3–2	Bristol City	Villa Park
	Jimmy Cantrell (29'); Charlie Millington (45'); Joe Bache (3–0)

8 December 1906	Notts County	1–1	Aston Villa	Trent Bridge
			Chris Buckley (1–1)

15 December 1906	Aston Villa	5–1	Sheffield United	Villa Park
	Albert Hall (19' pen); Jimmy Cantrell (22', 85', 86'); Charlie Millington (3–1)

22 December 1906	Bolton Wanderers	1–2	Aston Villa	Burnden Park
			Charlie Millington (9'); Joe Walters (90')

24 December 1906	Aston Villa	3–0	Preston North End	Villa Park
	Bobby Evans (26', 50'); Charlie Millington (60')

26 December 1906	Aston Villa	2–0	Manchester United	Villa Park
	Jimmy Cantrell (1–0); Frederick Chapple (2–0)

29 December 1906	Blackburn Rovers	2–1	Aston Villa	Ewood Park
			Jimmy Cantrell (1–2)

1 January 1907	Manchester United	1–0	Aston Villa	Bank Street

5 January 1907	Aston Villa	2–2	Sunderland	Villa Park
	Joe Bache (5'); Bobby Evans (26')

19 January 1907	Birmingham	3–2	Aston Villa	St Andrew's
			Frederick Chapple (6'); Joe Walters (29')

26 January 1907	Aston Villa	2–1	Everton	Villa Park
	Jimmy Cantrell (32'); Harry Hampton (73')

9 February 1907	Aston Villa	8–1	Wednesday	Villa Park
	Joe Bache (2', 78'); Charlie Millington (23'); Harry Hampton (38', 69'); Jimmy Cantrell (80', 86', 89')

16 February 1907	Bury	0–3	Aston Villa	Gigg Lane
			Jimmy Cantrell (10'); Harry Hampton (0–2, 0–3)

23 February 1907	Aston Villa	4–1	Manchester City	Villa Park
	Harry Hampton (36', 41', 67'); Albert Hall (55')

2 March 1907	Middlesbrough	1–0	Aston Villa	Ayresome Park

16 March 1907	Newcastle United	3–2	Aston Villa	St James' Park
			Albert Hall (12' pen); Jimmy Cantrell (60')

23 March 1907	Aston Villa	2–0	Derby County	Villa Park
	Charlie Millington (61'); Alec Logan (87')

30 March 1907	Aston Villa	4–0	Liverpool	Villa Park
	Harry Hampton (13'); Frederick Chapple (34'); Albert Hall (75', 87')

1 April 1907	Arsenal	3–1	Aston Villa	Manor Ground
			Albert Hall (30')

6 April 1907	Bristol City	2–4	Aston Villa	Ashton Gate
			Harry Hampton (30', 2–0, 4–2); Albert Hall (3–1)

13 April 1907	Aston Villa	0–0	Notts County	Villa Park

20 April 1907	Sheffield United	0–0	Aston Villa	Bramall Lane

27 April 1907	Aston Villa	0–2	Bolton Wanderers	Villa Park

Source: avfchistory.co.uk

== Reserves ==
The Aston Villa Reserves won the Birmingham & District League for the fifth year in succession.
