= 1905 FA Cup final =

1905 FA Cup Final
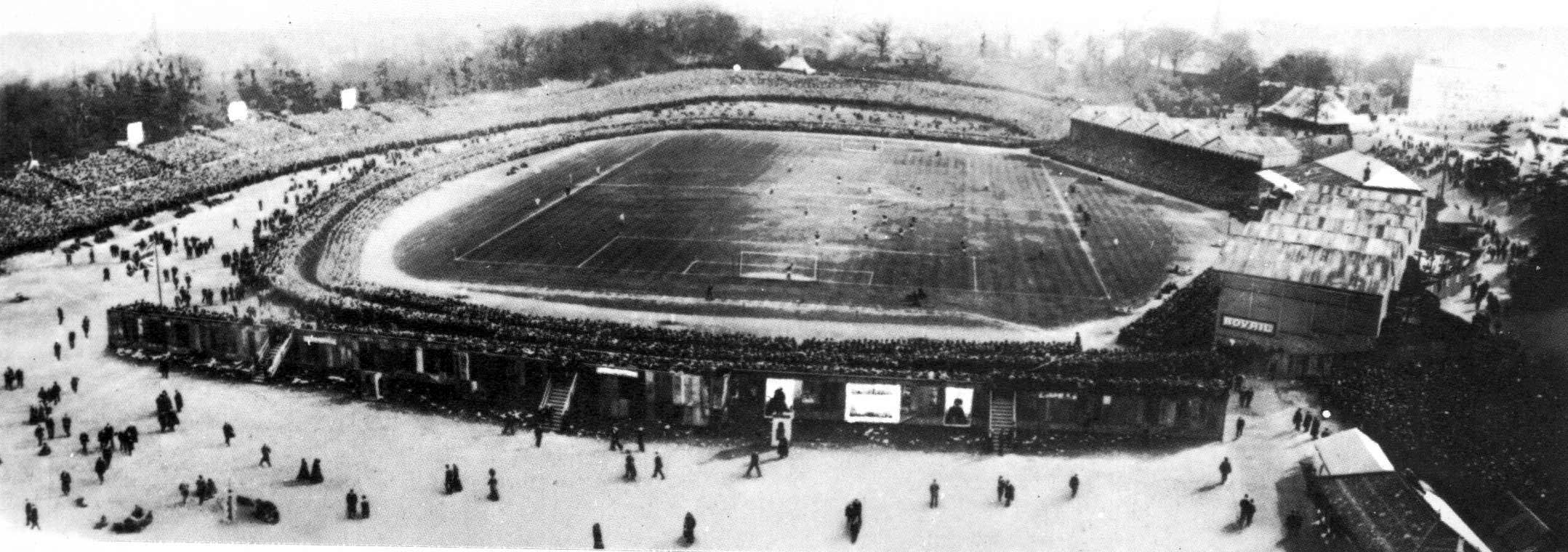
- A panoramic view of the Crystal Palace ground during the 1905 FA Cup final
- Event: 1904-05 FA Cup
Aston Villa	Newcastle United
2	0
- Date: 15 April 1905
- Venue: Crystal Palace, London
- Referee: P. R. Harrower
- Attendance: 101,117

The 1905 FA Cup final was contested by Aston Villa and Newcastle United at Crystal Palace. Aston Villa were victorious, winning 2–0, with Harry Hampton scoring both goals.

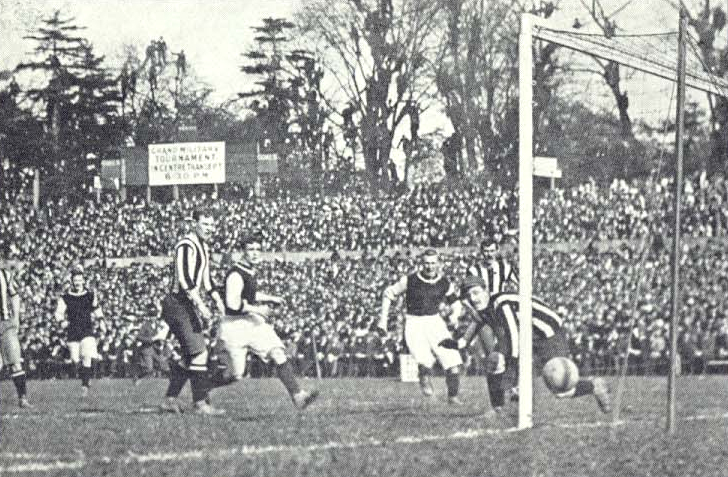
Harry Hampton scores one of his two goals in the final

== Match details ==
15 April 1905
15:00 BST

Aston Villa	2–0	Newcastle United
Hampton 2' 76'

Crystal Palace, London
Attendance: 101,117
Referee: P. R. Harrower

Aston Villa	Newcastle United

GK	(England) Billy George
RB	(England) Howard Spencer (c)
LB	(England) Alf Miles
RH	(England) Joe Pearson
CH	(England) Alex Leake
LH	(England) Jack Windmill
OR	(England) Billy Brawn
IR	(England) Billy Garraty
CF	(England) Harry Hampton
IL	(England) Joe Bache
OL	(England) Bert Hall
Secretary-Manager:
(Scotland) George Ramsay

GK	(Scotland) Jimmy Lawrence
RB	(Scotland) Andy McCombie
LB	(England) Jack Carr
RH	(Scotland) Alex Gardner
CH	(Scotland) Andy Aitken
LH	(Scotland) Peter McWilliam
OR	(England) Jock Rutherford
IR	(Scotland) James Howie
CF	(England) Bill Appleyard
IL	(England) Colin Veitch (c)
OL	(England) Bert Gosnell
Manager:
(Scotland) Frank Watt

Match rules

- 90 minutes.
- 30 minutes of extra-time if necessary.
- Replay if scores still level.

== Road to the Final ==
Aston Villa's Road to the Final
Round	Opposition	Score
First Round	Leicester Fosse (h)	5–1
Second Round	Bury (h)	3–2
Third Round	Fulham (h)	5–0
Semi Final	Everton (n)	1–1
SF Replay	Everton (n)	2–1

Newcastle's Road to the Final
Round	Opposition	Score
First Round	Plymouth Argyle (h)	1–1
1R Replay	Plymouth Argyle (a)	1–1
1R Replay	Plymouth Argyle (h)	2–0
Second Round	Tottenham Hotspur (a)	1–1
2R Replay	Tottenham Hotspur (h)	4–0
Third Round	Bolton Wanderers	2–0
Semi Final	The Wednesday (n)	1–0
