= 1903–04 British Home Championship =

Tournament details
- Host country: England, Ireland, Scotland and Wales
- Dates: 29 February – 9 April 1904
- Teams: 4

Final positions
- Champions: England (12th title)
- Runners-up: Ireland

Tournament statistics
- Matches played: 6
- Goals scored: 14 (2.33 per match)
- Top scorer(s): (England) Joseph Bache (England) George Davis (2 goals)

The 1903–04 British Home Championship football tournament was a low-scoring affair, won by a powerful England side who were followed by the unfancied Irish in second place. The tournament was played during the second half of the British domestic season and was, for the time, low-scoring.

England began well, with a hard-fought draw with Wales and a 3–1 victory over Ireland in their opening games. Scotland were unable to match this success, only managing draws against both sides. The Irish recovered from their early loss in their draw with Scotland and managed to beat the Welsh 1–0 in Bangor to claim second place. In the final game, England and Scotland played out a close encounter which England won 1–0 thanks to a goal by Steve Bloomer.

This was the first time in tournament history that either England or Scotland finished below second place.

== Table ==
Team	Pld	W	D	L	GF	GA	GD	Pts
England (C)	3	2	1	0	6	3	+3	5
Ireland	3	1	1	1	3	4	−1	3
Scotland	3	0	2	1	2	3	−1	2
Wales	3	0	2	1	3	4	−1	2

Rules for classification: 1) points. The points system worked as follows: 2 points for a win and 1 point for a draw.
(C) Champions

== Results ==
29 February 1904

Wales	2–2	England
Watkins 15'; Davies 75'		Davis 68'; Bache 77'

Racecourse Ground, Wrexham
Attendance: 9,000
Referee: Tom Robertson (Scotland)

12 March 1904

Ireland	1–3	England
Kirwan 49'		Common 16'; Bache 14'; Davis 65'

Solitude, Belfast
Attendance: 18,000
Referee: Tom Robertson (Scotland)

12 March 1904

Scotland	1–1	Wales
Walker 5'		Atherton 65'

Dens Park, Dundee
Attendance: 12,000
Referee: Frederick Thomas Kirkham (England)

21 March 1904

Wales	0–1	Ireland
		McCracken 77' (pen.)

Penrhyn Park, Bangor
Attendance: 10,000
Referee: Frederick Thomas Kirkham (England)

26 March 1904

Ireland	1–1	Scotland
Sheridan 70'		RC Hamilton 22'

Dalymount Park, Dublin
Attendance: 1,000
Referee: Frederick Thomas Kirkham (England)

9 April 1904

Scotland	0–1	England
		Bloomer 64'

Celtic Park, Glasgow
Attendance: 45,000
Referee: William Nunnerley (Wales)

== Winning squad ==
- England

Name	Apps/Goals by opponent			Total	
Name	(Wales) WAL	(Ireland) IRE	(Scotland) SCO	Apps	Goals
Tom Baddeley	1	1	1	3	0
Herbert Burgess	1	1	1	3	0
Bob Crompton	1	1	1	3	0
Joseph Bache	1/1	1/1		2	2
Alf Common	1	1/2		2	2
George Davis	1/1	1		2	1
Alex Leake		1	1	2	0
Vivian Woodward		1	1	2	0
William Brawn	1	1		2	0
Tommy Crawshaw	1	1		2	0
Herod Ruddlesdin	1	1		2	0
Steve Bloomer			1/1	1	1
Fred Blackburn			1	1	0
Stanley Harris			1	1	0
Jock Rutherford			1	1	0
Sam Wolstenholme			1	1	0
Bernard Wilkinson			1	1	0
Arthur Brown	1			1	0
Bert Lee	1			1	0
