= Frank Lloyd (disambiguation) =

Frank Lloyd (1886–1960), Frank William George Lloyd, was a British-American film director, scriptwriter, producer and actor.

Frank Lloyd may also refer to:

- Frank Lloyd (footballer, born 1876) (1876–1945), English footballer for Arsenal and Aston Villa
- Frank Lloyd (footballer, born 1928) (1928–2009), English footballer for Bradford City
- Frank Lloyd (actor) (died;1995), Australian-born actor
- Frank Eric Lloyd (1909–1992), Rhodesian author
- Frank Lloyd (horn player) (born 1952), English horn player and teacher
- Frank Lloyd, English newspaper publishing magnate, son of publisher Edward Lloyd

== See also ==
- Francis Lloyd (disambiguation)
- Frank Lloyd Wright (1867–1959), American architect
