= 1918–19 Aston Villa F.C. season =

English football club season

Aston Villa
1918-19 season
- Chairman: Frederick Rinder
- WW1: X
- FA Cup: WW1

The 1918-19 English football season was Aston Villa's 4th season of wartime football in England. Former player, Alfred Edwards was killed in action. He had served in the 17th and 13th battalions of the Middlesex Regiment during the First World War. He was holding the rank of lance sergeant at the time of his death on 4 November 1918, when, while "digging protection" under heavy shellfire, "he was hit in the head by a piece of shell and died a few minutes later".

During the First World War, between 1915 and 1919, the Football League and FA Cup were suspended and in their place regional league competitions were set up. Appearances in war tournaments did not count in players' official records. There were six regional leagues. The Lancashire and Midland Sections of the Football League were split into a principal tournament, consisting of a single league, and then a subsidiary tournament of four groups.

Many footballers signed up to fight in the war and as a result many teams were depleted, and fielded guest players instead. Villa players who participated in matches included Andy Ducat, playing in February 1919 in Mr George Robey's XI v the RAF, at Stamford Bridge refereed by Pat Harrower. Villa players participated in the following months rematch.

Sam Hardy served as an ordinary seaman in the Royal Navy during the First World War. In April 1919 he played in goal when the English League were beaten by the Scottish League.

Harry Hampton served on the Somme during the First World War and suffered from the effects of mustard gas poisoning. He guested for Stoke in 1918–19, scoring three goals in eight appearances. He also guested for Fulham. Hampton was never the same player after the War and after scoring 242 goals in 376 games for Aston Villa, he would move to local team, Birmingham.

== Midland Victory League ==
By April 1919 Villa were playing in the Midland Victory League. Aston Villa, Derby County, West Bromwich Albion and 2nd Division Wolverhampton Wanderers chose not to take part in the wartime league. The Midland Victory League was set up in preparation for the re-start of league football.

== See also ==
- List of Aston Villa F.C. records and statistics
