= Watty Corbett =

English footballer (1880–1960)

Olympic medal record

Men's football

Representing Great Britain
Gold medal – first place	1908 London	Team competition

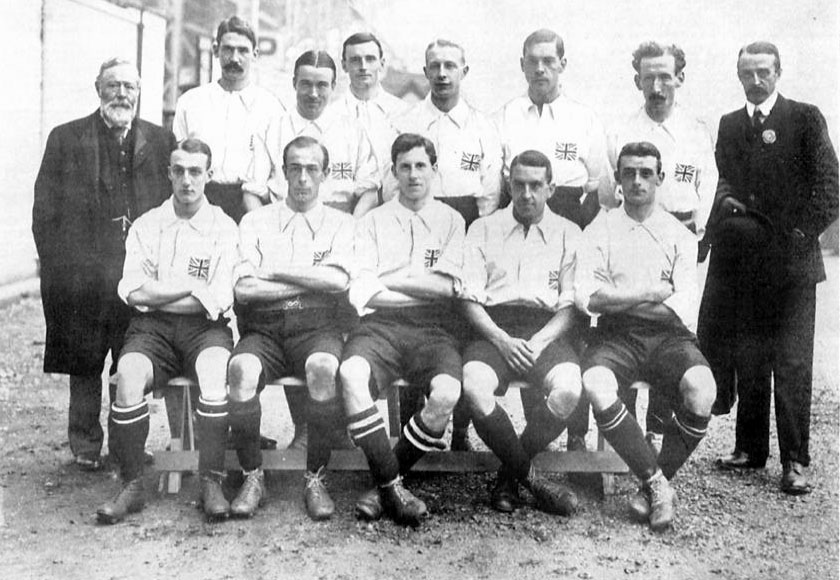

Walter Samuel Corbett (26 November 1880 – 23 November 1960), nicknamed "Watty", was an English footballer and member of the United Kingdom team which won the gold medal in the 1908 Summer Olympics.

Corbett, born in Wellington, Shropshire and educated at King Edward's School, Birmingham, arrived from Bournbrook FC to play for Aston Villa from 1904–05 to 1906–07 making 13 appearances before moving on to Birmingham. There, full back Corbett played 12 times in his first season.

In 1908 he was a member of the full England squad who toured Europe for the first time, making three appearances in the space of seven days against Austria, Hungary and Bohemia; all three matches resulted in comfortable victories for England.
