= Francis Lloyd =

Francis Lloyd may refer to:

- Francis Lloyd (British Army officer) (1853–1926)
- Francis Lloyd (Royalist) (died 1669), Welsh politician, MP for Carmarthen
- Francis Ernest Lloyd (1868–1947), American botanist
- Francis Lloyd (priest) (died 1712), Welsh Anglican priest
- Francis Lloyd (died 1799), MP for Montgomeryshire
- Francis Lloyd (MP for Ludlow), MP for Ludlow

== See also ==
- Frank Lloyd (disambiguation)
