= 1916–17 Aston Villa F.C. season =

English football club season

Aston Villa
1916-17 season
- WW1: X
- FA Cup: WW1

The 1916-17 English football season was Aston Villa's 2nd season of wartime football in England during the First World War. Between 1915 and 1919 the Football League and FA Cup were suspended and in their place regional league competitions were set up; appearances in these tournaments do not count in players' official records. Many footballers signed up to fight in the war and as a result many teams were depleted, and fielded guest players instead.

There were three regional leagues; the South-West Combination played in 1915–16 was discontinued. Each league, except the London Combination, was split into a principal tournament, consisting of a single league, and then a subsidiary tournament of four groups.

Jack Windmill saw active service in World War I in the Royal Warwickshire Regiment. He rose to the rank of Regimental Sergeant Major and gained the Military Cross and the Distinguished Conduct Medal for bravery.

Tommy Jackson served with the Royal Northumberland Fusiliers during World War I Sam Hardy served as an ordinary seaman in the Royal Navy during the First World War. In May 1917, nearly three years since the outbreak of the First World War, Jimmy Stephenson enlisted in the Royal Field Artillery and saw action on the Western Front and later served as part of the British Army of the Rhine.

The Battle of Bazentin Ridge in the North Western trench formation. Aston Trench was the front line before Villa Trench in the rear.

== See also ==
- List of Aston Villa F.C. records and statistics
