= Alf Wood (footballer, born 1876) =

English footballer (1876-1919)

Personal information
- Full name: Alfred Josiah Edward Wood
- Date of birth: 30 June 1876
- Place of birth: Smallthorne, England
- Date of death: 5 April 1919 (aged 42)
- Positions: Half-back; inside left

Youth career
- 1891–1892: Smallthorne Albion

Senior career*
Years	Team	Apps	(Gls)
1892–1895	Burslem Port Vale	63	(18)
1895–1901	Stoke	118	(10)
1901–1905	Aston Villa	103	(7)
1905–1907	Derby County	60	(2)
- Bradford Park Avenue
Total		344	(37)
- * Club domestic league appearances and goals

Alfred Josiah Edward Wood (30 June 1876 – 5 April 1919) was an English footballer who played in the Football League for Aston Villa, Burslem Port Vale, Derby County and Stoke. He helped Villa to finish second in the First Division in 1902–03 and helped Stoke to reach the FA Cup semi-finals in 1899.

== Career ==
Wood played for local side Smallthorne Albion, before joining Burslem Port Vale in December 1892, aged 16. He made seven Second Division appearances in the 1892–93 season, claiming two goals in a 4–0 win over Northwich Victoria at the Athletic Ground on 4 March. He was an ever-present for the Vale in the 32 game 1893–94 season, and scored 12 goals in 28 league games. He scored four goals in 28 league games in the 1894–95 campaign. A versatile player, he was utilised in most positions during his time at the club; including in goal at Rotherham Town on 28 October 1893, where he kept a clean sheet in a 1–0 win.

However, he signed for Southampton St Mary's in the summer of 1895. Port Vale lodged a complaint with The Football Association about "poaching", claiming that the contract was signed before the League season had ended. An emergency FA meeting was held at Sheffield, resulting in the "Saints" being severely censured for negligence. St Mary's were ordered to pay their own costs, plus £1 13s to Port Vale. The Southampton director, Alfred McMinn was suspended for a year and trainer Bill Dawson for a month; Wood's registration with St Mary's was cancelled. Wood never played for Port Vale again either, and instead returned to the Potteries and signed for Stoke in October 1895. He made an immediate impact, scoring on his debut against Derby County at the Baseball Ground. He slowly established himself in Horace Austerberry's squad and was involved in controversial scenes at the end of the 1897–98 season. Stoke had a poor campaign and finished bottom of the First Division, meaning they had to play a test match series against Newcastle United and Burnley. In the final match against Burnley, both teams went into the match knowing that a draw would see them remain in the First Division and throughout the 90 minutes, not a single attempt on goal was made, this led to the introduction of automatic promotion and relegation. The following season saw an improvement, as Stoke reached the semi-final of the FA Cup for the first time, losing out 3–1 to Derby County. Wood spent two more seasons at the Victoria Ground.

The 24-year-old Wood joined Aston Villa in March 1901. and became a regular at Villa Park for the next three seasons and almost won a league championship medal in 1902–03 as Villa finished as runner-up to The Wednesday. Wood left the "Villans" in May 1905, having scored seven goals in 111 league and cup games. He then played two seasons with Derby County, making 60 First Division appearances for the club. He later played for Bradford Park Avenue.

== Career statistics ==
Appearances and goals by club, season and competition
Club	Season	League			FA Cup		Test Match		Total	
Club	Season	Division	Apps	Goals	Apps	Goals	Apps	Goals	Apps	Goals
Burslem Port Vale	1892–93	Second Division	7	2	0	0	–		7	2
Burslem Port Vale	1893–94	Second Division	28	12	1	0	–		29	12
Burslem Port Vale	1894–95	Second Division	28	4	1	0	–		29	4
Burslem Port Vale	Total		63	18	2	0	0	0	65	18
Stoke	1895–96	First Division	4	1	0	0	–		4	1
Stoke	1896–97	First Division	12	4	0	0	–		12	4
Stoke	1897–98	First Division	19	2	2	0	4	0	25	2
Stoke	1898–99	First Division	27	0	6	0	–		33	0
Stoke	1899–1900	First Division	27	1	2	0	–		29	1
Stoke	1900–01	First Division	29	2	2	0	–		31	2
Stoke	Total		118	10	12	0	4	0	134	10
Aston Villa	1900–01	First Division	4	0	0	0	–		4	0
Aston Villa	1901–02	First Division	33	2	2	0	–		35	2
Aston Villa	1902–03	First Division	31	2	4	0	–		35	2
Aston Villa	1903–04	First Division	29	2	2	0	–		31	2
Aston Villa	1904–05	First Division	6	1	0	0	–		6	1
Aston Villa	Total		103	7	8	0	0	0	111	7
Derby County	1905–06	First Division	34	2	3	0	–		37	2
Derby County	1906–07	First Division	26	0	3	1	–		29	1
Derby County	Total		60	2	6	1	0	0	66	3
Career total			344	37	28	1	4	0	376	38
