= 1909–10 Aston Villa F.C. season =

English football club season

Aston Villa
1909–10 season
- President: Joseph Ansell
- Chairman: Frederick Rinder
- Manager: George Ramsay
- First Division: Champions (6)
- FA Cup: Round 3
Home colours

First Division
- Season: 1909–10
- Champions: Aston Villa, 6th English title
- Relegated: Chelsea; Bolton Wanderers
- Top goalscorer: Jack Parkinson (30 goals)
- Biggest home win: Blackburn 7–0 Woolwich Arsenal (2 October 1909)
- Biggest away win: Middlesbrough 0–5 Bury (12 February 1910)
- Highest scoring: Liverpool 6–5 Newcastle United (4 December 1910)

The 1909–10 English football season was Aston Villa's 22nd season in the Football League. Villa finished the season as the league's champions for a then record sixth time. This would be Villa's last league title for 71 years.

This season saw a straight fight between Villa and Liverpool and they finished well clear of the rest. Villa's record included a 15-match run without defeat. They built on this to finish five points ahead of Liverpool.

== First Division ==
Pos	Team	Pld	W	D	L	GF	GA	GAv	Pts
1	Aston Villa (C)	38	23	7	8	84	42	2.000	53
2	Liverpool	38	21	6	11	78	57	1.368	48
3	Blackburn Rovers	38	18	9	11	73	55	1.327	45
4	Newcastle United	38	19	7	12	70	56	1.250	45
5	Manchester United	38	19	7	12	69	61	1.131	45

Source: World Football
Rules for classification: 1) Points; 2) Goal average; 3) Goals scored
(C) Champions

Matches

1 September 1909	Aston Villa	5–1	Woolwich Arsenal
	Joe Bache (2); Albert Hall; Billy Gerrish; Joe Walters	Report
Note: After a wet summer, the dismal weather continued. It rained the whole afternoon leaving a very slippery pitch. Barely 6,000 braved the elements. Aston Villa played in white while Arsenal played in blue jerseys.

4 September 1909	Bolton Wanderers	1–2	Aston Villa
		Report	Charlie Wallace; Albert Hall (pen)

11 September 1909	Aston Villa	4–1	Chelsea
	Billy Gerrish (3); Joe Bache	Report

18 September 1909	Blackburn Rovers	3–2	Aston Villa
		Report	Billy Gerrish; Charlie Wallace

25 September 1909	Aston Villa	0–0	Nottingham Forest
		Report

2 October 1909	Sunderland	1–1	Aston Villa
		Report	Albert Hall

9 October 1909	Aston Villa	3–1	Everton
	Harry Hampton (2); George Hunter	Report

16 October 1909	Manchester United	2–0	Aston Villa
		Report

23 October 1909	Aston Villa	3–1	Bradford City
	Harry Hampton; Billy Gerrish; Albert Hall	Report

30 October 1909	Sheffield Wednesday	3–2	Aston Villa
		Report	Harry Hampton (2)

6 November 1909	Aston Villa	1–0	Bristol City
	Billy Gerrish	Report

13 November 1909	Bury	0–2	Aston Villa
		Report	Joe Bache (2)

20 November 1909	Aston Villa	3–2	Tottenham Hotspur
	Billy Gerrish; Joe Bache; Harry Hampton	Report

27 November 1909	Preston North End	1–0	Aston Villa
		Report

4 December 1909	Aston Villa	1–1	Notts County
	Harry Hampton	Report

11 December 1909	Newcastle United	1–0	Aston Villa
		Report

18 December 1909	Aston Villa	3–1	Liverpool
	Harry Hampton; Joe Bache (2)	Report

25 December 1909	Sheffield United	0–1	Aston Villa
		Report	Billy Gerrish

27 December 1909	Aston Villa	2–1	Sheffield United
	Harry Hampton; Joe Bache	Report

1 January 1910	Nottingham Forest	1–4	Aston Villa
		Report	Joe Bache; Harry Hampton (3)

8 January 1910	Aston Villa	3–1	Bolton Wanderers
	Joe Bache; Billy Gerrish; Harry Hampton	Report

22 January 1910	Chelsea	0–0	Aston Villa
		Report

29 January 1910	Aston Villa	4–3	Blackburn Rovers
	Harry Hampton (3); Joe Bache	Report

12 February 1910	Aston Villa	3–2	Sunderland
	Joe Walters; Chris Buckley; Billy Gerrish	Report

26 February 1910	Aston Villa	7–1	Manchester United
	Billy Gerrish (2); Joe Walters (3); Harry Hampton (2)	Report

5 March 1910	Bradford City	1–2	Aston Villa
		Report	Joe Bache; Own goal

12 March 1910	Aston Villa	5–0	Sheffield Wednesday
	Albert Hall (2); Charlie Wallace (pen); Joe Bache (2)	Report

14 March 1910	Everton	0–0	Aston Villa
		Report

19 March 1910	Bristol City	0–0	Aston Villa
		Report

25 March 1910	Aston Villa	4–2	Middlesbrough
	Harry Hampton (3); Joe Bache	Report

26 March 1910	Aston Villa	4–1	Bury
	Harry Hampton (3); Joe Walters	Report

28 March 1910	Middlesbrough	3–2	Aston Villa
		Report	Charlie Wallace (2, pens)

2 April 1910	Tottenham Hotspur	1–1	Aston Villa
		Report	Joe Bache

9 April 1910	Aston Villa	3–0	Preston North End
	Harry Hampton; Joe Bache; Billy Gerrish	Report

11 April 1910	Arsenal	1–0	Aston Villa
		Report

16 April 1910	Notts County	2–3	Aston Villa
		Report	Edmund Eyre; Harry Hampton; Charlie Wallace

27 April 1910	Aston Villa	4–0	Newcastle United
	Joe Bache; Charlie Wallace (pen); Edmund Eyre; Harry Hampton	Report

30 April 1910	Liverpool	2–0	Aston Villa
		Report

Source: avfchistory.co.uk

== FA Cup ==
First round

39 of the 40 clubs from the First and Second divisions joined the 12 clubs who came through the qualifying rounds.

Thirteen Southern League sides were also given byes to the first round to bring the total number of teams up to 64: Southampton, Millwall, QPR, Crystal Palace, Swindon, Plymouth, Reading, Portsmouth, Northampton, Bristol Rovers, Norwich, West Ham, Brighton.

32 matches were scheduled to be played on Saturday, 15 January 1910.

Tie no	Home team	Score	Away team	Date
29	Oldham Athletic	1–2	Aston Villa	15 January 1910

Second round

The 16 second-round matches were played on Saturday, 5 February 1910.

Tie no	Home team	Score	Away team	Date
3	Aston Villa	6–1	Derby County	5 February 1910

Third round

The eight third-round matches were scheduled for Saturday, 19 February 1910.

Tie no	Home team	Score	Away team	Date
2	Aston Villa	1–2	Manchester City	19 February 1910

== Players ==
The Villa team included centre-forward Harry Hampton and inside-forward Joe Bache. In their Villa careers, Hampton scored 213 goals in 338 appearances and Bache 167 in 431. Hampton was just 5 ft 8in tall and was a fearless, fast moving player on the field. The ever-present outside-right Charlie Wallace also enjoyed a long career at the club, scoring 54 goals in 314 League games. There were debuts for Billy Gerrish (55) and Arthur Moss, while Cocky Hunter became the first Villa player to be ever sent off.

== Youth & Reserves ==
Villa Reserves competed in the Birmingham & District League.
