= Billy Gerrish =

English footballer (1884–1916)

Personal information
- Full name: William Webber Walter Gerrish
- Date of birth: 28 December 1884
- Place of birth: Bristol, England
- Date of death: 8 August 1916 (aged 31)
- Place of death: Somme, France
- Height: 5 ft 9 in (1.75 m)
- Position: Inside forward

Youth career
- Eastville Board School

Senior career*
Years	Team	Apps	(Gls)
–1905	Freemantle		
1905–1909	Bristol Rovers	49	(11)
1909–1912	Aston Villa	55	(17)
1912	Preston North End	3	(0)
1912–1913	Chesterfield Town	8	(0)
- * Club domestic league appearances and goals

William Webber Walter Gerrish (28 December 1884 – 8 August 1916), sometimes known as Willie Gerrish, was an English professional footballer who played as an inside forward in the Football League for Aston Villa and Preston North End.

== Personal life ==
Gerrish's brother Howard was also a footballer. In February 1915, six months into the First World War, Gerrish enlisted in the Football Battalion of the Middlesex Regiment. He was severely wounded in both legs by a shell blast at Delville Wood on 8 August 1916 and died later that day. Gerrish has no known grave and is commemorated on the Thiepval Memorial.

== Career statistics ==
Appearances and goals by club, season and competition
Club	Season	League			FA Cup		Other		Total	
Club	Season	Division	Apps	Goals	Apps	Goals	Apps	Goals	Apps	Goals
Bristol Rovers	1905–06	Southern League First Division	1	0	0	0	—		1	0
Bristol Rovers	1906–07	Southern League First Division	5	2	0	0	—		5	2
Bristol Rovers	1907–08	Southern League First Division	14	1	0	0	—		14	1
Bristol Rovers	1908–09	Southern League First Division	29	8	0	0	—		29	8
Bristol Rovers	Total		49	11	0	0	—		49	11
Aston Villa	1909–10	First Division	36	14	3	1	—		39	15
Aston Villa	1910–11	First Division	14	3	0	0	—		14	3
Aston Villa	1911–12	First Division	5	0	0	0	—		5	0
Aston Villa	Total		55	17	3	1	—		58	18
Chesterfield Town	1912–13	Midland League	8	0	0	0	0	0	8	0
Career total			63	17	3	1	0	0	66	18

== Honours ==
Aston Villa

- Football League First Division: 1909–10
