= Tom Niblo =

Scottish footballer and manager

Personal information
- Full name: Thomas Bruce Niblo
- Date of birth: 24 September 1878
- Place of birth: Dunfermline, Scotland
- Date of death: 30 June 1933 (aged 54)
- Place of death: Newcastle upon Tyne, England
- Positions: Outside forward; centre forward

Senior career*
Years	Team	Apps	(Gls)
–1895	Cadzow Oak		
1895–1896	Hamilton Academical	3	(1)
1896–1898	Linthouse	13	(2)
1898–1902	Newcastle United	60	(5)
1899	→ Middlesbrough (loan)	3	(2)
1902–1904	Aston Villa	45	(9)
1904–1906	Nottingham Forest	46	(10)
1906–1907	Watford	30	(8)
1907–1908	Newcastle United	0	(0)
1908	Hebburn Argyle		
1908–1909	Aberdeen	15	(2)
1909–1910	Raith Rovers	18	(2)
1910–1911	Cardiff City	4	(0)
- Blyth Spartans

International career
1904	Scotland	1	(0)

Managerial career
- 1908: Hebburn Argyle (player-manager)
- * Club domestic league appearances and goals

Thomas Bruce Niblo (24 September 1878 – 30 June 1933) was a Scottish professional footballer who played as an outside forward and forward. He played the majority of his career in the Football League for Newcastle United, Middlesbrough, Aston Villa and Nottingham Forest. He also played in the Scottish and Southern Leagues and was capped once by Scotland at international level.

== Career ==
After leaving Raith Rovers in 1910, Niblo was one of three signings announced by Southern Football League Second Division side Cardiff City in November of the same year. Having trained with Newcastle United to maintain fitness, he was immediately named in the first team for his debut against Aberdare Athletic. He played three further games for the club before departing shortly after.

== Personal life ==
Niblo worked as a boilermaker on Tyneside when his football career came to an end. He served as a bombardier in the Royal Field Artillery and the Royal Garrison Artillery during the First World War.

== Career statistics ==
Appearances and goals by club, season and competition
Club	Season	League			National Cup		Other		Total	
Club	Season	Division	Apps	Goals	Apps	Goals	Apps	Goals	Apps	Goals
Hamilton Academical	1895–96	Scottish Alliance	3	1	―		0	0	3	1
Linthouse	1896–97	Scottish League Division Two	13	2	0	0	3 (Note: Appearances in Scottish Qualifying Cup)	0	16	2
Newcastle United	1897–98	Second Division	1	0	―		―		1	0
Newcastle United	1898–99	First Division	10	0	0	0	―		10	0
Newcastle United	1899–1900	First Division	11	2	0	0	―		11	2
Newcastle United	1900–01	First Division	26	2	0	0	―		26	2
Newcastle United	1901–02	First Division	12	1	―		―		12	1
Newcastle United	Total		60	5	0	0	―		60	5
Middlesbrough (loan)	1899–1900	Second Division	3	2	―		―		3	2
Aston Villa	1901–02	First Division	12	2	0	0	―		12	2
Aston Villa	1902–03	First Division	17	1	4	0	―		21	1
Aston Villa	1903–04	First Division	16	6	2	0	―		18	6
Aston Villa	Total		45	9	6	0	―		51	9
Nottingham Forest	1904–05	First Division	29	7	2	0	―		31	7
Nottingham Forest	1905–06	First Division	17	3	0	0	―		17	3
Nottingham Forest	Total		46	10	2	0	―		48	10
Watford	1906–07	Southern League First Division	30	8	2	0	―		32	8
Aberdeen	1908–09	Scottish League Division One	15	2	2	1	5 (Note: 3 appearances and 3 goals in Robertson Cup, 2 appearances and 2 goals in North East Cup)	5	22	8
Raith Rovers	1909–10	Scottish League Division Two	18	2	0	0	―		18	2
Cardiff City	1910–11	Southern League Second Division	4	0	0	0	2 (Note: Appearances in Welsh Cup)	0	6	0
Career total			237	41	12	1	10	5	259	47
