= George Harris (Australian footballer) =

Australian rules footballer, born 1902

Personal information
- Full name: George Henry Welsford Harris
- Born: 31 January 1902; Castlemaine, Victoria
- Died: 17 June 1981 (aged 79); Parkville, Victoria
- Height: 183 cm (6 ft 0 in)
- Weight: 76 kg (168 lb)

Playing career^{1}
Years	Club	Games (Goals)
1921	Essendon	1 (0)
1923	Geelong	4 (2)
Total		5 (2)
- ^{1} Playing statistics correct to the end of 1923.

George Henry Welsford Harris (31 January 1902 – 17 June 1981) was an Australian rules footballer who played with Essendon and Geelong in the Victorian Football League (VFL).
