= Frank Lloyd (footballer, born 1928) =

English footballer

Personal information
- Date of birth: 16 January 1928
- Place of birth: Darton, England
- Date of death: 8 March 2009 (aged 81)
- Place of death: Barnsley, England
- Position: Left half

Youth career
- Leeds United
- Barnsley

Senior career*
| Years | Team | Apps | (Gls) |
| 1951–1954 | Bradford City | 24 | (0) |
- Bentley Colliery
- Ossett Town
| Total | | 24+ | (0+) |
- * Club domestic league appearances and goals

Frank Lloyd (16 January 1928 – 8 March 2009) was an English professional footballer who played as a left half.

== Career ==
Born in Darton, Lloyd played as an amateur for Barnsley before joining Bradford City in July 1951. During his time with Bradford City he made 24 appearances in the Football League.

Lloyd began his career with Leeds United, and ended his career with Bentley Colliery and Ossett Town.

== Sources ==
- Frost, Terry (1988). Bradford City A Complete Record 1903-1988. Breedon Books Sport. ISBN 0-907969-38-0.
