= 1904–05 FA Cup =

Tournament details
- Country: England

Final positions
- Champions: Aston Villa (4th title)
- Runners-up: Newcastle United

The 1904–05 FA Cup was the 34th season of the world's oldest association football competition, the Football Association Challenge Cup (more usually known as the FA Cup). Aston Villa won the competition for the fourth time, beating Newcastle United 2–0 in the final at Crystal Palace, through two goals scored by Harry Hampton. The man of the match was Aston Villa's prolific scorer Billy Garraty, who was born only a few miles from the now Villa Park.

Matches were scheduled to be played at the stadium of the team named first on the date specified for each round, which was always a Saturday. If scores were level after 90 minutes had been played, a replay would take place at the stadium of the second-named team later the same week. If the replayed match was drawn further replays would be held at neutral venues until a winner was determined. If scores were level after 90 minutes had been played in a replay, a 30-minute period of extra time would be played.

== Calendar ==
The format of the FA Cup for the season had two preliminary rounds, six qualifying rounds, an intermediate round, three proper rounds, and the semi-finals and final.

Round	Date
Extra Preliminary round	Saturday 10 September 1904
Preliminary round	Saturday 17 September 1904
First qualifying round	Saturday 1 October 1904
Second qualifying round	Saturday 15 October 1904
Third qualifying round	Saturday 29 October 1904
Fourth qualifying round	Saturday 12 November 1904
Fifth qualifying round	Saturday 26 November 1904
Sixth Qualifying round	Saturday 10 December 1904
Intermediate Round	Saturday 14 January 1905
First round proper	Saturday 4 February 1905
Second round	Saturday 18 February 1905
Third round	Saturday 4 March 1905
Semifinals	Saturday 25 March 1905
Final	Saturday 15 April 1905

== Qualifying rounds ==
An extra preliminary round of ten ties was required at the start of this season's tournament, with 14 teams from the south-east of England and six from the north-east taking part. Kent League club Sheppey United matched the achievement of Leytonstone in the previous season's competition by winning through to the third qualifying round before being defeated by Hastings & St Leonards.

The Football Association also introduced a sixth qualifying round in this year's tournament to allow more Football League clubs to be exempted to a later stage. However, the ten clubs winning through to the Intermediate Round from the sixth qualifying round were Bradford City, Blackpool, Barnsley, Chesterfield, Lincoln City, Gainsborough Trinity and Leicester Fosse from the Football League Second Division and Fulham, Brentford and Brighton & Hove Albion from the Southern League. While Brighton & Hove Albion and Bradford City were appearing at this stage for the first time, this was the first FA Cup tournament since the establishment of the Southern League in 1894 not to feature any teams from outside that organisation or the Football League in the main rounds.

== Intermediate Round ==
The Intermediate Round featured ten games played between the winners from the sixth qualifying round and ten teams given byes. Manchester United, Bristol City, West Bromwich Albion, Burnley and Grimsby Town from the Second Division were entered automatically into this round, as were Reading, Portsmouth, Bristol Rovers, Plymouth Argyle and Millwall of the Southern League.

The other Second Division sides had to gain entry to this round through the qualifying rounds. Glossop, Blackpool, Burton United, Gainsborough Trinity, Leicester Fosse and Doncaster Rovers were entered in the third qualifying round stage with only Blackpool, Leicester and Gainsborough reaching the Intermediate Round. Chesterfield, Barnsley, Bradford City, Lincoln City and Burslem Port Vale were all entered in the sixth qualifying round, with only the latter losing in that round.

Tie no	Home team	Score	Away team	Date
1	Bristol City	2–1	Blackpool	14 January 1905
2	Burnley	1–1	Lincoln City	14 January 1905
Replay	Lincoln City	3–2	Burnley	18 January 1905
3	Grimsby Town	2–0	Gainsborough Trinity	14 January 1905
4	West Bromwich Albion	2–5	Leicester Fosse	14 January 1905
5	Brentford	1–1	Reading	14 January 1905
Replay	Reading	2–0	Brentford	18 January 1905
6	Portsmouth	0–0	Chesterfield	14 January 1905
Replay	Portsmouth	2–0	Chesterfield	18 January 1905
7	Brighton & Hove Albion	1–2	Bristol Rovers	14 January 1905
8	Manchester United	2–2	Fulham	14 January 1905
Replay	Fulham	0–0	Manchester United	18 January 1905
Replay	Manchester United	0–1	Fulham	23 January 1905
9	Plymouth Argyle	2–0	Barnsley	14 January 1905
10	Bradford City	1–4	Millwall	14 January 1905

== First round proper ==
The first round proper contained sixteen ties between 32 teams. The 18 First Division sides were given a bye to this round, as were Liverpool and Bolton Wanderers from the Second Division, and non-league Southampton and Tottenham Hotspur. They joined the ten teams who won in the intermediate round.

The matches were played on Saturday, 4 February 1905. Seven matches were drawn, with the replays taking place in the following midweek fixture. Two of these went to a second replay the following week.

Tie no	Home team	Score	Away team	Date
1	Bury	1–0	Notts County	4 February 1905
2	Liverpool	1–1	Everton	4 February 1905
Replay	Everton	2–1	Liverpool	8 February 1905
3	Southampton	3–1	Millwall Athletic	4 February 1905
4	Stoke	2–0	Grimsby Town	4 February 1905
5	Nottingham Forest	2–0	Sheffield United	4 February 1905
6	Blackburn Rovers	1–2	The Wednesday	4 February 1905
7	Aston Villa	5–1	Leicester Fosse	4 February 1905
8	Bolton Wanderers	1–1	Bristol Rovers	4 February 1905
Replay	Bristol Rovers	0–3	Bolton Wanderers	8 February 1905
9	Middlesbrough	1–1	Tottenham Hotspur	4 February 1905
Replay	Tottenham Hotspur	1–0	Middlesbrough	9 February 1905
10	Sunderland	1–1	Wolverhampton Wanderers	4 February 1905
Replay	Wolverhampton Wanderers	1–0	Sunderland	8 February 1905
11	Derby County	0–2	Preston North End	4 February 1905
12	Lincoln City	1–2	Manchester City	4 February 1905
13	Small Heath	0–2	Portsmouth	4 February 1905
14	Woolwich Arsenal	0–0	Bristol City	4 February 1905
Replay	Bristol City	1–0	Woolwich Arsenal	8 February 1905
15	Newcastle United	1–1	Plymouth Argyle	4 February 1905
Replay	Plymouth Argyle	1–1	Newcastle United	8 February 1905
Replay	Newcastle United	2–0	Plymouth Argyle	13 February 1905
16	Fulham	0–0	Reading	4 February 1905
Replay	Reading	0–0	Fulham	8 February 1905
Replay	Fulham	1–0	Reading	13 February 1905

== Second round proper ==
The eight second-round matches were scheduled for Saturday, 18 February 1905. There were two replays, played in the following midweek fixture.

Tie no	Home team	Score	Away team	Date
1	Bristol City	0–0	Preston North End	18 February 1905
Replay	Preston North End	1–0	Bristol City	23 February 1905
2	Stoke	0–4	Everton	18 February 1905
3	Aston Villa	3–2	Bury	18 February 1905
4	The Wednesday	2–1	Portsmouth	18 February 1905
5	Wolverhampton Wanderers	2–3	Southampton	18 February 1905
6	Tottenham Hotspur	1–1	Newcastle United	18 February 1905
Replay	Newcastle United	4–0	Tottenham Hotspur	22 February 1905
7	Manchester City	1–2	Bolton Wanderers	18 February 1905
8	Fulham	1–0	Nottingham Forest	18 February 1905

== Third round proper ==
The four quarter final matches were scheduled for Saturday, 4 March 1905. The Preston North End – The Wednesday game was drawn, and replayed on 9 March.

Tie no	Home team	Score	Away team	Date
1	Preston North End	1–1	The Wednesday	4 March 1905
Replay	The Wednesday	3–0	Preston North End	9 March 1905
2	Aston Villa	5–0	Fulham	4 March 1905
3	Bolton Wanderers	0–2	Newcastle United	4 March 1905
4	Everton	4–0	Southampton	4 March 1905

== Semifinals ==
The semi-final matches were played on Saturday, 25 March 1905. Aston Villa's match with Everton was drawn and thus replayed four days later. Aston Villa won and went on to meet Newcastle United in the final.

25 March 1905
15:00

Aston Villa	1–1	Everton

Victoria Ground, Stoke-on-Trent

Replay

29 March 1905
15:00

Aston Villa	2–1	Everton

City Ground, Nottingham

25 March 1905
15:00

Newcastle United	1–0	The Wednesday

Hyde Road, Manchester

== Final ==
The final was contested by Aston Villa and Newcastle United at Crystal Palace. Aston Villa won 2–0, with Harry Hampton scoring both goals.

=== Match details ===
15 April 1905
15:00 GMT

Aston Villa	2 – 0	Newcastle United
Hampton 2' 76'

Crystal Palace, London
Attendance: 101,117
Referee: P. R. Harrower

Aston Villa	Newcastle United

== See also ==
- FA Cup final results 1872-
