= Tom Perry (footballer) =

English footballer

Personal information
- Full name: Thomas Henry Perry
- Date of birth: 12 August 1871
- Place of birth: West Bromwich, England
- Date of death: 18 July 1927 (aged 55)
- Place of death: West Bromwich, England
- Height: 5 ft 10 in (1.78 m)
- Position: Right half

Youth career
- Christ Church School

Senior career*
Years	Team	Apps	(Gls)
- Christ Church
- West Bromwich Baptists
- Stourbridge
1890–1901	West Bromwich Albion		
1901–1903	Aston Villa	28	(1)

International career
1898	England	1	(0)
- * Club domestic league appearances and goals

Thomas Henry Perry (12 August 1871 – 18 July 1927) was an English international footballer, who played as a right half.

== Early and personal life ==
Perry was born in West Bromwich on 12 August 1871, the fifth of nine children. He was one of five brothers to play football, including older brother Charlie. He worked as a spring balance maker and was married with four daughters.

== Career ==
Perry played locally for Christ Church School, Christ Church, West Bromwich Baptists and Stourbridge, and professionally for West Bromwich Albion and Aston Villa. He was transferred to Aston Villa for £50 for the 1901–02 season. He retired due to injury in 1903. With West Brom he was a runner-up in the 1894–95 FA Cup. He also earned representative honours for the Football League.

He earned one cap for England on 28 March 1898.
