= Francis Lloyd (priest) =

Welsh Anglican priest

Francis Lloyd was a Welsh Anglican priest .

The son of Bishop Humphrey Lloyd, he was educated at Oriel College, Oxford. He held livings at Criccieth, Llanrhaiadr in Kinmerch, Llandyrnog and Llandudno. He was appointed Archdeacon of Merioneth, in 1683, a post he held under his death in 1712.
