= George Harris (baseball) =

American baseball player

- Second baseman

Negro league baseball debut
- 1932, for the Louisville Black Caps

Last appearance
- 1932, for the Louisville Black Caps

Teams
- Louisville Black Caps (1932)

George Harris is an American former Negro league second baseman who played in the 1930s.

Harris played for the Louisville Black Caps in 1932. In six recorded games, he posted one hit in 17 plate appearances.
