= Jack Windmill =

English footballer

Personal information
- Full name: Joseph William Windmill
- Date of birth: 8 June 1881
- Place of birth: Brierley Hill, England
- Date of death: 29 October 1927 (aged 46)
- Place of death: Kingswinford, England
- Position: Left half

Senior career*
Years	Team	Apps	(Gls)
–1903	Halesowen Town		
1903–1910	Aston Villa	42	(1)
- * Club domestic league appearances and goals

Joseph William Windmill MC, DCM (8 June 1881 – 29 October 1927) was an English footballer who played as a left half for Halesowen Town and Aston Villa.

== Early life and footballing career ==
Windmill was born and educated in the Black Country. Having been born in Brierley Hill he attended Moor Street Council School in the same town. He played initially for Halesowen Town before joining Aston Villa in 1903 and making his debut on 7 November 1903 in a 3–1 home win against Newcastle United. This was his only appearance of the 1903–04 season and he would have to wait until 22 October 1904 for his next game. This marked the start of regular league appearances for Windmill and of a successful FA Cup run which saw Aston Villa beat Newcastle United in the 1905 FA Cup Final, on 15 April 1905, with Windmill gaining a winner's medal. In the 1905–06 season his opportunities to play were less and he turned-out in only 16 games. In the following three seasons, however, he made only a single appearance in the league in Aston Villa colours. Windmill, as with many footballers of the time, had employment away from football, in his case teaching. In 1910 the local education committee forced him to end his footballing career as they felt that it interfered with his teaching duties.

== After football and World War I ==
Windmill saw active service in World War I in the Royal Warwickshire Regiment. He rose to the rank of Regimental Sergeant Major and gained the Military Cross and the Distinguished Conduct Medal for bravery. After the war he continued in the teaching profession and was appointed headmaster of Brook Street School, Wordsley in 1922. Windmill died at his Kingswinford home in 1927 aged 46.

== Honours ==
Aston Villa

- FA Cup: 1904–05
