= Bert Hall (footballer, born 1882) =

English footballer

Personal information
- Full name: Albert Edward Hall
- Date of birth: 21 January 1882
- Place of birth: Wordsley, Stourbridge, Worcestershire, England
- Date of death: 17 October 1957 (aged 76)
- Position: Forward

Youth career
- Amblecote Council School
- Brierley Hill Wanderers
- Wall Heath
- –1903: Stourbridge

Senior career*
Years	Team	Apps	(Gls)
1903–1914	Aston Villa	214	(61)
1914–1922	Millwall		

International career
1910	England	1	(0)
- * Club domestic league appearances and goals

Albert Edward Hall (21 January 1882 – 17 October 1957) was an English professional footballer who played for Aston Villa and England.

== Career ==
Aston Villa signed Hall from Stourbridge in 1903. He scored six goals in his nine league outings in the 1903–04 season. He is noted as having been a hard working outside left player who teamed up well with Joe Bache between 1904 and 1910. Hall was a consistent goalscorer, scoring 61 goals in 214 league and cup appearances. In 1913 Hall left Villa to join Millwall and he retired in 1916.

== Honours ==
With Villa, Hall won an FA Cup in 1905 and the First Division championship medal in 1910, the year when he won his first, and only, England cap in a game against Ireland.

== Bibliography ==
- Hayes, Dean (1997). The Villa Park Encyclopedia: A-Z of Aston Villa. Mainstream Publishing (2 Oct 1997). p. 80. ISBN 978-1-85158-959-3.
