= Jimmy Murray (footballer, born 1880) =

Scottish footballer

Personal information
- Full name: James Arthur Murray
- Date of birth: 9 June 1880
- Place of birth: Benwhat, Scotland
- Date of death: 29 October 1933 (aged 53)
- Place of death: Glasgow, Scotland
- Position: Forward

Senior career*
Years	Team	Apps	(Gls)
- St Augustine's
- Benwhat Heatherbell
1897–1901	Ayr		
1901	Aston Villa	2	(0)
1901–1902	Small Heath	1	(1)
1902–1903	Watford	27	(6)
1903	Kettering	10	(3)
1903–1904	Wellingborough	25	(10)
1905–19??	Kings Heath Albion		
- * Club domestic league appearances and goals

James Arthur Murray (9 June 1880 – 29 October 1933) was a Scottish professional footballer who played in the Football League for Aston Villa and Small Heath. He played as a right-sided forward. He represented the Scottish Junior international team.

Murray was born in Benwhat, Dalmellington, Ayrshire. He played for St Augustine's and for Benwhat Heatherbell before joining Ayr in 1897. In March 1901 he moved to England and signed for the Football League champions Aston Villa; he played once in the 1900–01 season and once the following season before joining local rivals Small Heath in November 1901. Murray scored in his only competitive outing for Small Heath, in a losing cause against Sunderland in the First Division, and was described as "fairly fast, has capital command of the ball and can shoot excellently". Nevertheless, he moved to Southern League club Watford in 1902, and later appeared for Kettering and Wellingborough, also in the Southern League.

He died in Glasgow in 1933 at the age of 53.
