= Alex Leake =

English footballer (1871-1938)

- Leake in Birmingham colours

Personal information
- Full name: Alexander Leake
- Date of birth: 11 July 1871
- Place of birth: Birmingham, England
- Date of death: 29 March 1938 (aged 66)
- Place of death: Birmingham, England
- Position: Half back

Senior career*
Years	Team	Apps	(Gls)
–	Hoskins & Sewell		
–	Kings Heath Albion		
–	Saltley Gas Works		
–	Singer's		
–	Hoskins & Sewell		
1892–1894	Old Hill Wanderers		
1894–1902	Small Heath	199	(21)
1902–1907	Aston Villa	127	(7)
1907–1910	Burnley	81	(2)
1910–1911	Wednesbury Old Athletic		

International career
1904–1905	England	5	(0)
- * Club domestic league appearances and goals

Alexander Leake (11 July 1871 – 29 March 1938) was an English professional footballer who won five caps for his country and made 407 appearances in the Football League playing as a half back for Small Heath, Aston Villa and Burnley. After retiring from playing he took up coaching, both with professional clubs and at school level. He was a cousin of fellow Small Heath and England forward Jimmy Windridge.

== Biography ==
Leake was born in Small Heath, Birmingham. After leaving school he trained as a blacksmith with Hoskins & Sewell, manufacturers of metal bedsteads, in the Bordesley district of Birmingham, and played for the works football team. He later helped Old Hill Wanderers win the championship of the Birmingham & District League in the 1893–94 season. His success with Old Hill did not go unnoticed, and he signed for Small Heath, newly promoted to the Football League First Division, in July 1894.

Leake made his Small Heath debut in October 1895 at left half, but from midway through that season (in which the club were relegated) for the following four years he rarely missed a game at centre-half. He was soon appointed captain. When he did suffer an injury early in the 1899–1900 season, inside forward Walter Wigmore was tried at centre-half, and by the time Leake regained fitness, his position was taken. He played the remainder of his Small Heath career at left-half or occasionally inside-left. He helped the club gain promotion back to the First Division in 1901, but left at the end of the 1901–02 season when they were relegated again. During this season he played in an England trial match and with clubmate Sid Wharton played for an England XI in an unofficial international against Germany. In a 1901 profile of the Small Heath club and players in the Daily Express, C.B. Fry wrote:

Leake is one of the best half-backs of the day; he is a character, and very popular. Fast, with exceptional stamina, he is on the go all the game through; yet never tires. He has been a faithful friend to his club, which owes—and knows it owes—him much. He captains his team with ability and a tact that may almost be called inspiration, He makes—he does not wait for—success. And what he gets he deserves.

He joined Aston Villa in July 1902, when he was 31, and stayed five years. In his first season the club were runners-up in the First Division, and in 1905 he played in their 1905 FA Cup final team which beat Newcastle United 2–0. While with Aston Villa Leake won five official caps for England, making his international debut at the age of 32 on 12 March 1904 in a 3–1 win against Ireland in Belfast.

Leake found himself unwittingly at the centre of one of the great scandals of English football. In the last League game of the 1904–05 season, Manchester City needed to beat Aston Villa to win the title. It was a spiteful game, and he had been involved in confrontations, both physical and verbal, with opponents. Afterwards Leake, who had captained the side, claimed that City's Billy Meredith had offered him a bribe of £10 for his team to throw the match. Meredith was found guilty by the Football Association, fined, and suspended from all football for 18 months. Because his club refused to help him financially, Meredith made public the illegal payments Manchester City were making to their players. An FA investigation resulted in life bans for directors, long suspensions for players, and the club being forced to sell its playing staff.

An Aston Villa match programme of 1906 describes him as:

A good-tempered, honest worker; safe rather than showy. Hard to beat in a tackle, and good at spoiling an opponent's pass. Alert, keeps his head, and never tires in the hardest matches. His unfailing good humor has made him a general favourite.

Burnley manager Spen Whittaker took him to the club in December 1907, by which time he was 36 years old. He stayed with them a further two and a half years, playing a significant part in building a team for the future. His arrival has been described thus:

By this time Leake was 36 years old, but he still possessed the panache of a class player. His authority on the pitch led to his appointment as team captain, and the faithful on the terraces at Turf Moor purred their appreciation, taking an instant shine to their new centre-half. One should not underestimate the psychological benefits of having a man there who had been at the top of his profession, a natural leader who could counsel and advise the youngsters from a position of experience.

When Burnley were promoted to the First Division in 1913, Leake was long gone, but he played his part. At the celebration dinner, the club chairman commented that:

We replaced the old with the new, and did this all the time with a profit to the club. The purchase of Alex Leake started the financial success of Burnley Football Club. When we played Rawtenstall and Fishwick Rovers in 1883, the gates were a few pounds only. This season we have joined at gates of £3,003 against Blackburn and £2,256 against Sunderland.

In 1910 he returned to the Midlands and played for one season with Wednesbury Old Athletic, newly elected to the Birmingham & District League. He then took up posts as trainer with Crystal Palace, Merthyr Town, and Walsall, and also coached at school level.

Leake died in his native Birmingham at the age of 66.

== Honours ==
Old Hill Wanderers

- Birmingham & District League champions 1894

Small Heath

- Second Division promotion 1900–01

Aston Villa

- First Division runners up 1902–03
- FA Cup winners 1905

Wednesbury Old Athletic

- Wednesbury Charity Cup joint winners 1911
