= George Harris (footballer, born 1878) =

English footballer

Personal information
- Full name: George Abner Harris
- Date of birth: 1 January 1878
- Place of birth: Halesowen, England
- Date of death: 4 June 1923 (aged 45)
- Place of death: Old Hill, England
- Position: Wing half

Senior career*
Years	Team	Apps	(Gls)
1896–1897	Haden Hill Rose		
1897–1898	Halesowen		
1898–1899	Coombs Wood		
1899–1900	Halesowen		
1901–1908	Aston Villa	20	(1)
1908–1910	West Bromwich Albion	19	(0)
1910–1912	Wellington Town		
1912	Coventry City		
Total		39	(1)
- * Club domestic league appearances and goals

George Abner Harris (1 January 1878 – 4 June 1923) was an English footballer who played in the Football League for Aston Villa and West Bromwich Albion.

In retirement he was a publican at Old Hill. He was killed in an industrial accident in 1923 when, talking to a foreman in a scrapyard, he was struck by a crane's jib.
