= Arthur Millar (footballer) =

Scottish footballer

Personal information
- Full name: Arthur Thompson Millar
- Date of birth: 26 January 1877
- Place of birth: Rossie Island, Montrose, Scotland
- Date of death: 1942 (aged 64–65)
- Place of death: England, buried Rossie Island
- Height: 5 ft 10 in (1.78 m)
- Position: Wing half

Senior career*
Years	Team	Apps	(Gls)
189?–1896	Montrose		
1896–1901	Millwall Athletic		
1901–1903	Aston Villa	10	(0)
1903	→ Millwall (loan)		
1903–1904	Millwall		
1904–1905	Brighton & Hove Albion	31	(0)
- * Club domestic league appearances and goals

Arthur Thompson Millar (26 January 1877 – 27 February 1942) was a Scottish professional footballer who played as a wing half in the English Football League for Aston Villa. He also played in the Southern League for Millwall Athletic and Brighton & Hove Albion.

== Life and career ==
Millar was born in Rossie Island, Montrose, in 1877. He played football for his hometown club before moving to England in 1896 to sign for Southern League club Millwall Athletic. He remained with Millwall for five seasons, captained the team, and was reportedly very popular with the supporters: He was part of the team that eliminated reigning Football League champions, Aston Villa from the 1899–1900 FA Cup after two replays to reach the semifinal, in which Millwall lost to Southampton after just one replay. Villa were sufficiently impressed with Millar that they signed him, but he made only ten appearances in the First Division before returning to Millwall, initially on loan. He finished his career with a season at another Southern League club, Brighton & Hove Albion, where he was remembered as a "hard, resolute defender". Millar died on 27 February 1942 in England, was cremated and later buried in the family plot at Rossie Island, Scotland.
