= Pat Harrower =

Scotland international rugby union player

- Born: Patrick Robertson Harrower; 19 January 1863 Broughty Ferry, Scotland
- Died: June 1936 (aged 72–73) Pancras, London, England

Rugby union career
- Position: Fullback
Amateur team(s)
Years	Team	Apps	(Points)
- Abertay RFC
- Reindeer Club
- London Scottish
Provincial / State sides
Years	Team	Apps	(Points)
- Middlesex
International career
Years	Team	Apps	(Points)
1885	Scotland	1	(0)

Patrick Robertson Harrower (19 January 1863 – June 1936) was a Scotland international rugby union player. Harrower is also notable as an association football referee, and he officiated the 1905 FA Cup Final.

== Rugby Union career ==
=== Amateur career ===
Harrower was born in Broughty Ferry in Forfarshire in 1863. He discovered rugby union at Brockley College. He played rugby union as a fullback. Brockley College was famous in rugby union for producing Louis Auldjo, the early Scotland international player. As a 13 year old Harrower skipped school to play for Abertay RFC who were playing Edinburgh University RFC. Abertay won the match thanks to a goal scored by Patrick's brother Frank.

In 1879, he and his family moved to Islington, Middlesex, England. His first rugby union club in England was the Reindeer Club. However he was quickly spotted by London Scottish and moved to play for them.

In 1886, he played for a combined London Scottish and London Welsh side.

The Athletic News of 2 February 1903 ran this biography of Harrower:

This gentleman, P. R, Harrower, is a Scotsman birth and Londoner choice for business purposes, so that he may be classed in the same school its his fellow compatriots, Dr. John Smith and A. J. Christie, so far as devotion to both codes of football is concerned. At his college in the North of Scotland, Harrower was a very keen rugby player, but he left the land of his birth for the Metropolis in 1879, and forthwith turned out for the Reindeer club as a three-quarter, but the London Scottish commandeered him two years later, and continued with them until his marriage some six years later, though he admits that did really play under the name of Scott what time he should have been merely a spectator. But various bruises were the means of unmasking him at home. Which reminds of two friends who were also supposed to have given up playing after marriage but that is another story. It was in the season of 1895-6 that Harrower was given an International cap and in addition he figured in the Middlesex fifteens for two or three seasons as a full back and three-quarter.

He was bad subject to reform, however, for in 18S8, whilst watching the Enfield Association Club, was invited to try his foot at Association. He could not resist, the sporting instinct was too strong, spite home ties and admonitions, with the result that in October made his debut as centre forward, and so well did he please himself and the club that he continued to play regularly until 1897. He refereed a few club games, so as to kill the desire to play for ever, and once at Cambridge, where the ’Varsity were meeting Reading, the Southern Leaguers were so pleased with his decisions that they proposed him a S.L. referee for the following season, and he has since continued take Southern League, Western League, and English Cup appointments.

This season he was placed on the list of the Football League, and from what little experience he has had of First League crowds he rather enjoys his association with the Premier League. His experience has been fortunate so far, in as much as he has always succeeded in keeping firm but kindly control of the players, and as he still retains the vitality of youth he generally well up with the play the fastest of games. In his prime he won a fair number of cups a swimmer and runner, and is still a very keen cricketer. He plays for the Surrey Club and Ground, and has scored several centuries for them during the last three seasons, while as a slow bowler has obtained a pretty fair number of wickets. A great pigeon fancier, he has secured many prizes with his fantails and pygmy pouters. Only last year he won outright two silver bowls and a cup value £25, not to mention a few gold medals. The "Unspeakable Scot" is often a very enthusiastic all-round sportsman.

=== Provincial career ===
He played for Middlesex county side.

=== International career ===
His one and only international appearance was for Scotland, against Wales in the 1885 Home Nations Championship standing in for the team's regular fullback, James Veitch. The match ended in a 0–0 draw, with the Welsh team accused of trying to kill the game by their players continually lying on the ball. The next game, Veitch returned to the squad and Harrower never represented his country again.

== Association Football career ==
=== Playing career ===
He played for Enfield F.C. as a centre-forward.

He then played for the Vampires, who later changed their name to Richmond F.C.

=== Refereeing career ===
Harrower's refereeing career reached its peak when he officiated the 1905 FA Cup Final between Aston Villa and Newcastle. He refereed several international games, with three recorded friendlies between 1906 and 1908, all three games being played between Belgium and the Netherlands.

The Dundee Courier of 21 January 1932 ran this update on Harrower:

A Famous Scot. ADMIRERS of that well-known referee of the early years of the century, P. R. Harrower, will be interested to hear that he is still well and hearty on his 72nd birthday. Harrower was referee of great personality. He is Scotsman, but in 1905 he achieved the great ambition of all English referees "taking" the F.A. Cup final. This was the year in which Aston Villa beat Newcastle United at the Crystal Palace by 2-0. Originally a rugger player, he got his cap for Scotland against Wales in 1885, but on going to London he took to soccer.

== Cricket career ==
He played for Surrey Club and Ground.

== Business career ==
Although he was well-known for his refereeing career, Pat mostly worked as a shipping merchant and insurance broker.

== Family ==
Pat was the son of corn merchant George Kerr Harrower and his wife, Jemima Margaret Wright. The family lived in Broughty Ferry, which was then a suburb of Dundee, but later became a section of the city. His parents separated, and Pat went with his mother and siblings to live in England in 1879. In 1885, Pat married Annie Mary Lake; they had one son, Stewart Dare Harrower. Pat and Annie separated. About 1899, Patrick married Elizabeth Maud (surname unknown). Finally, in 1926, Pat married Ivy Owen. Pat and Ivy had another son, Patrick.

== Death ==
In June 1936, he died in Pancras, London, England. He was buried in St. Pancras Cemetery on 9 June 1936.

== Bibliography ==
- Godwin, Terry (1984). The International Rugby Championship 1883-1983. London: Willows Books. ISBN 0-00-218060-X.
- Griffiths, John (1987). The Phoenix Book of International Rugby Records. London: Phoenix House. ISBN 0-460-07003-7.
