= Alf Miles =

English footballer

Alfred Miles (January 1884 – February 1926), also known as Freddie, was an English footballer. As a professional he only played for Aston Villa. He was a full-back who made 269 appearances for Aston Villa in his 11-year career at Villa Park. After his retirement as a player he became the first team trainer, a job he held for 11 years. He died in Wylde Green, Sutton Coldfield on 8 February 1927.

== Career ==
He was signed from Aston St Marys where he played his early football as an amateur. He made his Villa debut in a 7–3 win at Nottingham Forest on 19 December 1903. During his first season at Villa he developed a good understanding with Howard Spencer. In 1905 he won the FA Cup after Aston Villa beat Newcastle United 2–0. When Spencer retired in 1907, Alf Miles teamed up with Tommy Lyons to become one of the most effective defensive pairings in the First Division culminating in the First Division win in 1909–10 season. Alf Miles retired in the summer of 1914 having played a total of 269 league and cup games. He then became the club trainer until 1925.

Miles was called as a witness at the trial of George Stagg, who was found guilty of the murder of Aston Villa's defender Tommy Ball in November 1923.
