= Billy Matthews (footballer, born 1882) =

English footballer

Personal information
- Full name: William Matthews
- Date of birth: 1882
- Place of birth: Derby, England
- Date of death: 1 May 1916 (aged 33)
- Place of death: Melbourne, England
- Position: Forward

Senior career*
Years	Team	Apps	(Gls)
	Ripley Athletic	?	(?)
1903–1906	Aston Villa	25	(12)
1906–1912	Notts County	177	(37)
1912–1913	Derby County	1	(0)
	Newport County	?	(?)
Total		203+	(49+)
- * Club domestic league appearances and goals

William Matthews (1882 – 1 May 1916) was an English footballer who played as a forward. Born in Derby, Derbyshire, he played for Ripley Athletic, Aston Villa, Notts County, Derby County and Newport County. He died after a long illness.
