= Frank Lloyd (footballer, born 1876) =

English footballer

Personal information
- Date of birth: 18 September 1876
- Place of birth: London, England
- Date of death: 1945 (aged 68–69)
- Position: Outside right

Senior career*
Years	Team	Apps	(Gls)
- Wednesbury Old Athletic
1899–1900	Woolwich Arsenal	19	(3)
1900–1901	Aston Villa	5	(1)
- Dundee
Total		24+	(4+)
- * Club domestic league appearances and goals

Frank Lloyd (18 September 1876 – 1945) was an English professional footballer who played as an outside right.

Born in London, Lloyd played for Wednesbury Old Athletic, Woolwich Arsenal, Aston Villa and Dundee.
