= Jack Shutt (footballer) =

English footballer

Personal information
- Full name: John Hartley Shutt
- Date of birth: 9 November 1874
- Place of birth: Burnley, England
- Date of death: 1950 (aged 77–78)
- Position: Full back

Senior career*
Years	Team	Apps	(Gls)
1894–1895	Brierfield		
1895–1896	Nelson		
1896–1897	Bolton Wanderers	0	(0)
1896–1900	Swindon Town		
1900–1901	Millwall Athletic		
1901–1904	Aston Villa	40	(0)
1904	Colne		
Total		40	(0)
- * Club domestic league appearances and goals

John Hartley Shutt (9 November 1874–1950) was an English footballer who played in the Football League for Aston Villa.
