= Harry Hampton (footballer, born 1885) =

English footballer (1885–1963)

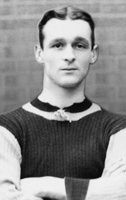

Personal information
- Full name: Joseph Harry Hampton
- Date of birth: 21 April 1885
- Place of birth: Wellington, England
- Date of death: 15 March 1963 (aged 77)
- Place of death: Rhyl, Wales
- Height: 5 ft 8 1/2 in (1.74 m)
- Position: Forward

Youth career
- Shifnal Juniors
- Lilleshall Iron Works

Senior career*
Years	Team	Apps	(Gls)
1902–1904	Wellington Town		
1904–1920	Aston Villa	339	(215)
1920–1922	Birmingham	57	(31)
1922–1923	Newport County	14	(2)
1924–1925	Wellington Town		
Total		410	(248)

International career
1913–1914	England	4	(2)
- * Club domestic league appearances and goals

Joseph Harry Hampton (21 April 1885 – 15 March 1963) was an English footballer who was born in Wellington, Shropshire. Hampton remains Aston Villa's all-time leading goalscorer in the League.

== Playing career ==
=== Youth ===
According to a friend speaking to the Wellington Journal and Shrewsbury News after his death, Hampton began his playing career with Lilleshall Iron Works team then joined Wellington Town, before transferring to Aston Villa on a professional contract for £120 in April 1904.

=== Aston Villa ===
Better known as "Happy" Harry Hampton or as "The Wellington Whirlwind," he played as a centre forward for Aston Villa from 1904 to 1920. He scored both goals against Newcastle United in the 1905 FA Cup Final. Hampton was a prolific goalscorer and once scored five goals when Aston Villa beat Sheffield Wednesday 10–0 in a First Division match in 1912. He was joint top goalscorer in the First Division in the 1911–12 season. Between 1913 and 1914 Hampton was capped by England four times, scoring two goals in games against Wales and Scotland.

=== First World War ===
Hampton served on the Somme during the First World War and suffered from the effects of mustard gas poisoning. Hampton was never the same player after the War and after scoring 242 goals in 376 games for Aston Villa, he moved to Birmingham. Hampton guested for Stoke in 1918–19, scoring three goals in eight appearances. He also guested for Fulham.

=== Birmingham ===
At Birmingham, Hampton became the Second Division club's star player, his 16 goals made him their top scorer for the 1920–21 season and helped the club win the Second Division title. He ultimately scored 31 goals out of 59 appearances in the club before transferring to Newport County in Wales.

=== Later ===
Later, playing for Newport County, he scored two goals in 15 appearances. He returned to Wellington Town, only to appear for one season.

Following his retirement from playing, Hampton was a coach at Preston North End and former club, Birmingham. He later ran a catering business in Rhyl, where he died in 1963 at the age of 77.

== Career statistics ==
Appearances and goals by club, season and competition
Club	Season	League			FA Cup		Total	
Club	Season	Division	Apps	Goals	Apps	Goals	Apps	Goals
Aston Villa	1904–05	First Division	22	15	6	7	28	22
Aston Villa	1905–06	First Division	32	19	3	1	35	20
Aston Villa	1906–07	First Division	29	21	1	0	30	21
Aston Villa	1907–08	First Division	28	18	2	1	30	19
Aston Villa	1908–09	First Division	30	9	1	0	31	9
Aston Villa	1909–10	First Division	32	26	3	3	35	29
Aston Villa	1910–11	First Division	33	19	2	2	35	21
Aston Villa	1911–12	First Division	33	25	3	3	36	28
Aston Villa	1912–13	First Division	33	25	6	5	39	30
Aston Villa	1913–14	First Division	30	19	2	0	32	19
Aston Villa	1914–15	First Division	30	19	2	0	32	19
Aston Villa	1919–20	First Division	7	0	0	0	7	0
Aston Villa	Total		339	215	34	27	373	242
Birmingham	1919–20	Second Division	10	11	1	0	11	11
Birmingham	1920–21	Second Division	29	16	1	0	30	16
Birmingham	1921–22	First Division	18	4	0	0	18	4
Birmingham	Total		57	31	2	0	59	31
Newport County	1922–23	Third Division South	14	2	1	0	15	2
Career total			410	248	37	27	447	275

== Honours ==
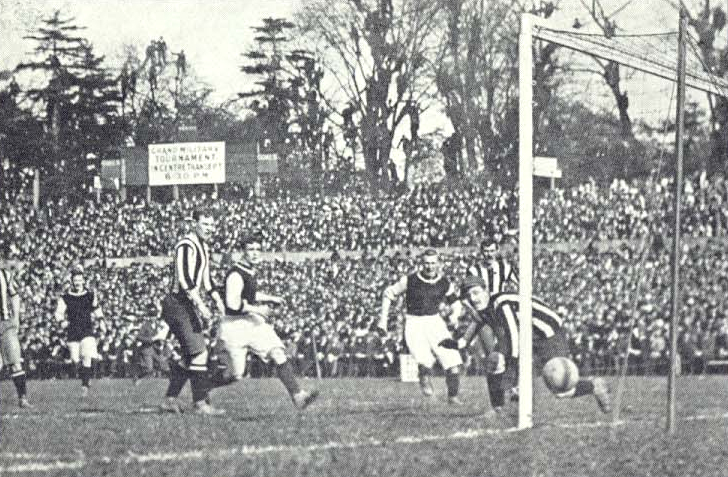
Harry Hampton scored both goals in the 1905 FA Cup Final.

Aston Villa

- Football League First Division: 1909–10
- FA Cup: 1904–05, 1912–13

Birmingham

- Football League Second Division: 1920–21
