= George Harris (footballer, born 1875) =

English footballer

Personal information
- Full name: George Harris
- Date of birth: 1875
- Place of birth: Headless Cross, England
- Date of death: 27 June 1910 (aged 34–35)
- Place of death: Headless Cross, England
- Position: Goalkeeper

Senior career*
Years	Team	Apps	(Gls)
1893–1894	Headless Cross		
1894–1895	Redditch Excelsior		
1895–1896	Aston Villa	1	(0)
1897–1900	Wolverhampton Wanderers	7	(0)
1900–1901	Grimsby Town	13	(0)
1901–1906	Portsmouth		
1906–1907	Redditch Town		
1907–1908	Tunbridge Wells Rangers		
1908–19??	Kidderminster Harriers		
- * Club domestic league appearances and goals

George Harris (1875 – 27 June 1910) was an English professional footballer who played as a goalkeeper. In 1908, he lost his eye in an air gun accident, ending his career.
