= Billy Brawn =

English footballer (1878–1932)

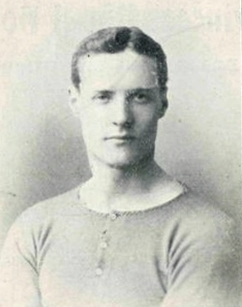
- Brawn while with Chelsea.

Personal information
- Full name: William Frederick Brawn
- Date of birth: 1 August 1878
- Place of birth: Wellingborough, England
- Date of death: 18 August 1932 (aged 54)
- Place of death: Brentford, England
- Height: 6 ft 1 in (1.85 m)
- Position: Outside right

Senior career*
Years	Team	Apps	(Gls)
–1893	Wellingborough St Mark's		
1893–1898	Wellingborough Town		
1898–1900	Northampton Town		
1900–1901	Sheffield United	14	(4)
1901–1906	Aston Villa	95	(19)
1906–1907	Middlesbrough	56	(5)
1907–1911	Chelsea	93	(10)
1911–1913	Brentford	69	(8)
1916–1917	→ Brentford (guest)	3	(0)
1918	Tottenham Hotspur	1	(0)

International career
1904	England	2	(0)
- * Club domestic league appearances and goals

William Frederick Brawn (1 August 1878 – 18 August 1932) was an English international footballer who played as an outside right in the Football League, most notably for Aston Villa and Chelsea. He was nicknamed "Gansey".

== Playing career ==
Born in Wellingborough, Brawn began his career as an amateur with local non-League clubs Wellingborough St Mark's, Wellingborough Town and Northampton Town. He turned professional when he joined First Division club Sheffield United in January 1900 for a £125 fee. He moved to Aston Villa in December 1901, with whom he won two England caps in 1904 and the 1904–05 FA Cup. Brawn later played League football for Middlesbrough and Chelsea and ended his career with Southern League club Brentford. The final appearance of Brawn's career came in the colours of Tottenham Hotspur, when the White Hart Lane club turned up a man short for a London Combination fixture versus Brentford at Griffin Park on 8 November 1918.

== Administrative career ==
Brawn served on the Brentford board of directors in 1919 and acted as "advisory manager" from 1919 until 1921.

== Personal life ==
Brawn married Ada in Wellingborough in 1902. While with Brentford, Billy Brawn ran the Kings Arms Hotel at 19 Boston Road, Brentford and lived there until his death in 1932.

== Career statistics ==
Appearances and goals by club, season and competition
Club	Season	League			FA Cup		Total	
Club	Season	Division	Apps	Goals	Apps	Goals	Apps	Goals
Sheffield United	1899–1900	First Division	5	3	0	0	5	3
Sheffield United	1900–01	First Division	3	0	0	0	3	0
Sheffield United	1901–02	First Division	6	1	0	0	6	1
Sheffield United	Total		14	4	0	0	14	4
Aston Villa	1901–02	First Division	1	0	0	0	1	0
Aston Villa	1902–03	First Division	16	2	4	0	20	2
Aston Villa	1903–04	First Division	32	7	2	1	34	8
Aston Villa	1904–05	First Division	31	7	6	0	37	7
Aston Villa	1905–06	First Division	15	3	—		15	3
Aston Villa	Total		95	19	12	1	107	20
Middlesbrough	1905–06	First Division	8	1	0	0	8	1
Middlesbrough	1906–07	First Division	37	4	2	1	39	5
Middlesbrough	1907–08	First Division	11	0	—		11	0
Middlesbrough	Total		56	5	2	1	58	6
Chelsea	1907–08	First Division	26	4	2	0	28	4
Chelsea	1908–09	First Division	32	3	2	0	34	3
Chelsea	1909–10	First Division	23	3	2	1	25	4
Chelsea	1910–11	Second Division	12	0	0	0	12	0
Chelsea	Total		93	10	6	1	99	11
Brentford	1911–12	Southern League First Division	34	4	5	1	39	5
Brentford	1912–13	Southern League First Division	35	4	2	0	37	4
Brentford	Total		69	8	7	1	76	9
Career Total			327	46	27	4	354	50

== Honours ==
Aston Villa

- FA Cup: 1904–05

England

- British Home Championship: 1903–04
