= Billy George (footballer, born 1874) =

English footballer and cricketer

Personal information
- Full name: William George
- Date of birth: 29 June 1874
- Place of birth: Shrewsbury, England
- Date of death: 4 December 1933 (aged 59)
- Place of death: Birmingham, England
- Position: Goalkeeper

Senior career*
Years	Team	Apps	(Gls)
–1897	Trowbridge Town		
1897–1911	Aston Villa	356	(0)

International career
1902	England	3	(0)
- * Club domestic league appearances and goals

William George (29 June 1874 – 4 December 1933) was a footballer who played goalkeeper for Aston Villa from October 1897 to July 1911. His previous clubs were the now defunct Woolwich Ramblers, Army football for the Royal Artillery and Trowbridge Town when he was on leave. He was signed by Aston Villa from the Army for £50 in 1897. He played in 356 league matches and 40 cup matches.

While at Villa Park, George kept goal in three Villa title winning sides in 1899, 1900 and 1910 as well as their 1905 cup winning side.

His international career was limited and he had 3 caps with the England team in 1902. He was sold to Birmingham City as a player/trainer in 1911.

He is regarded as one of the best goalkeepers to have played for Aston Villa in its history.

One of the greatest – if not the greatest – goalkeeper in the history of the club. For many seasons was at the top of his form, after a superb opening display against WBA. Quick on his feet, splendid reach, full of resource, punches the ball with great power, fields well, and a grand kick. A rare good man on a side, and an ornament to the game — The Villa News and Record, 1 September 1906

George also played 13 first-class cricket matches as a batsman with Warwickshire. He also played county cricket for Wiltshire and, in 1900, for Shropshire while a club professional player at Shrewsbury.

William George appears on the Professional Footballers' Association's list of former Aston Villa players who served in the First World War but details of his service in the war are lacking.
