= Willie Clarke (footballer) =

Scottish footballer

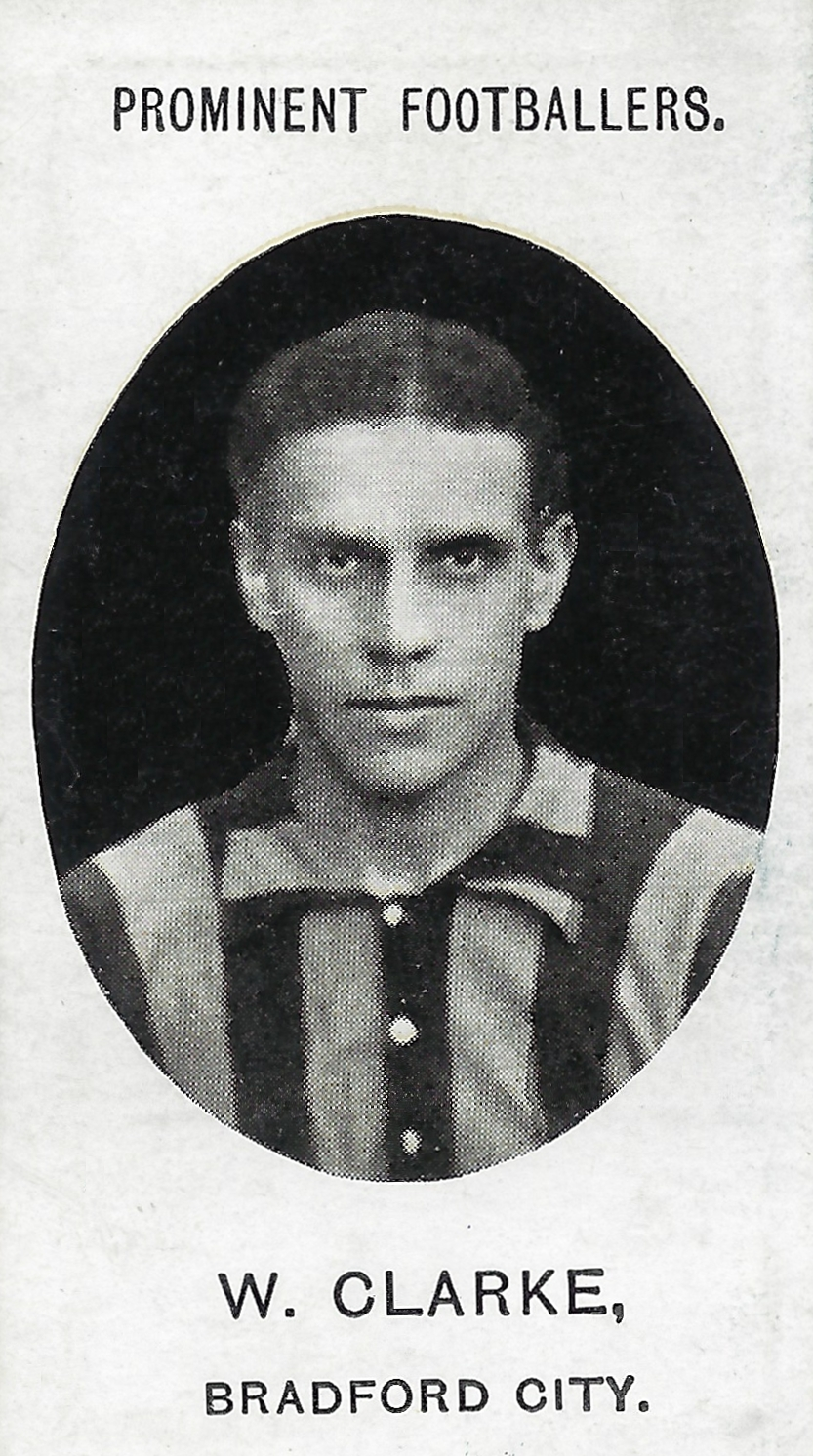
- Clarke featured in the Taddy 'Prominent Footballers' cigarette card series in 1907 while playing for Bradford City

Personal information
- Full name: William Gibb Clark
- Date of birth: 3 March 1878
- Place of birth: Mauchline, Scotland
- Date of death: 1949 (aged 70–71)
- Place of death: Tunbridge Wells, England
- Position: Outside right

Senior career*
Years	Team	Apps	(Gls)
–1896	Kelburn		
1896–1897	Crown Athletic		
1897–1900	Third Lanark	0	(0)
1898–1899	→ Arthurlie		
1899–1900	→ East Stirlingshire		
1900–1901	Bristol Rovers	20	(3)
1901–1905	Aston Villa	41	(5)
1905–1909	Bradford City	92	(15)
1909–1911	Lincoln City	35	(1)
1911–1912	Croydon Common		
Total		188	(24)

International career
1897	Scotland Juniors	1	(0)
- * Club domestic league appearances and goals

William Gibb Clarke (3 March 1878 – 1949) was a Scottish professional footballer who played as a winger. Clarke was the first Black professional footballer to score in the English Football League, while playing for Aston Villa in December 1901. He was also the second Black player to represent Scotland, after Andrew Watson, by playing for the Scotland juniors side in 1897.

== Early life, ancestry and early career ==
Born in Mauchline, East Ayrshire to Alexander and Jemima Clark in 1878, his father was born in Georgetown, Demerara, British Guiana. Born William Clark, he would be referred to as Willie Clarke after he moved to England later in his life. Records show that his grandfather Duncan Clark worked as a wood cutter and married a local woman named Cecilia Hutton, with their son Alexander being sent back to Scotland to boarding school. Clarke's family moved to Glasgow in the 1890s when his father found work as an engine fitter. In early 1900 William was listed as an upholsterer in Glasgow's Cathcart Street.

== Club career ==
=== Scotland ===
Clarke played for junior clubs Kelburn and Crown Athletic before Scottish Football League side Third Lanark signed him in 1897, some sources also suggest he played for Govan side Benburb. He did not break into the first team there and was registered to non-League sides Arthurlie and East Stirlingshire between 1898 and 1900 while Third Lanark continued to hold his league registration.

=== England ===
Clarke attracted interest of a Southern Football League side in 1899 but ultimately signed for East Stirlingshire instead. The following year he did move to the Southern League, joining Bristol Rovers. In over a decade in the Southern Football League and Football League Divisions One and Two, Clarke played for Bristol Rovers, Aston Villa, Bradford City, and Lincoln City. He later played for Croydon Common before retirement in 1912.

In 1901, while playing for Aston Villa, Clarke became the first non-white player to score in the English First Division.

== International career ==
Clarke was called up to the Scotland juniors side in 1897. He played against Ireland in Belfast on 27 March 1897 and contributed to a 3–1 win.

== Later life and military service ==
Having retired from his football in 1912 Clarke served in World War I, being among the first to sign up in August 1914. Willie was initially a Private in the Middlesex Regiment, and later moved regiments to become a Sapper in the Royal Engineers. He served in the theatre of war and was awarded the 1914 Star, Victory Medal and the British War Medal. Following the war he moved to Tunbridge Wells in Kent and worked as an upholsterer, continuing the trade he had learned in Glasgow before his professional football career.
