= George Johnson (footballer, born 1871) =

English footballer

Personal information
- Date of birth: November 1871
- Place of birth: West Bromwich, England
- Date of death: 1934 (aged 62–63)
- Position: Forward

Senior career*
Years	Team	Apps	(Gls)
- West Bromwich Baptists
- Wrockwardine Wood
1895	West Bromwich Albion	0	(0)
1896–1897	Walsall	55	(23)
1897–1904	Aston Villa	99	(38)
- Plymouth Argyle
- Crystal Palace
Total		154	(61)
- * Club domestic league appearances and goals

George Johnson (November 1871 – 1934) was an English footballer who played in the Football League for Aston Villa and Walsall.
