= Micky Noon =

English footballer

Personal information
- Full name: Michael Noon
- Date of birth: 16 August 1875
- Place of birth: Whitwick, England
- Date of death: 1939 (aged 63–64)
- Position: Full back

Senior career*
| Years | Team | Apps | (Gls) |
| 1896–1897 | Coalville Albion | | |
| 1897–1899 | Burton Swifts | 35 | (0) |
| 1899–1906 | Aston Villa | 74 | (1) |
| 1906–1907 | Plymouth Argyle | 38 | (0) |
| 1907–1908 | Burton United | | |
| 1908–1909 | Coalville Town | | |
| 1910–1911 | Whitwick Imperial | | |
| Total | | 109 | (1) |
- * Club domestic league appearances and goals

Michael Noon (16 August 1875–1939) was an English footballer who played in the Football League for Aston Villa and Burton Swifts. He finished his career with Whitwick Imperial in 1910–11.
