= Joe Pearson (footballer) =

English footballer

Joseph Frank Pearson (19 September 1877 – 26 April 1946) was a football player in the early years of professional football in England. Pearson played for Aston Villa from August 1900 to May 1908. Before playing for Villa, he played for Saltley College FC. He went on to become headmaster of Wollaston Boys' School in September 1919, and later a councillor on Stourbridge Borough Council. He served as Mayor of Stourbridge for two years, starting in November 1941.
