= Billy Garraty =

England international footballer

Personal information
- Full name: William Garraty
- Date of birth: 6 October 1878
- Place of birth: Saltley, England
- Date of death: 6 May 1931 (aged 52)
- Place of death: Perry Barr, England
- Position: Forward

Youth career
- Aston Shakespeare

Senior career*
Years	Team	Apps	(Gls)
1897–1908	Aston Villa	224	(96)
1908	Leicester Fosse	6	(0)
1908–1910	West Bromwich Albion	53	(22)
1910–1911	Lincoln City		
Total		283	(118)

International career
1903	England	1	(0)
- * Club domestic league appearances and goals

William Garraty (6 October 1878 – 6 May 1931) was a footballer who played as a forward. He started his career in the early years of professional football in England, and played for Aston Villa from August 1897 to September 1908. Before playing for Villa he played for Aston Shakespeare. Garraty was capped once by England appearing in a game against Wales in 1903.

== Career ==
Billy Garraty made his league debut for Aston Villa during the 1897–98 season but made just one other appearance that year and remained a bit part player as Aston Villa won the title the following year. Garraty became a first team regular in the 1899–1900 season as Aston Villa retained their title thanks to his league-leading 27 league goals – only Pongo Waring scored more in a single season.

Garraty made 41 appearances in the 1900–01 season, more than any other player. He went on to make 224 league appearances for the Villans, scoring 96 league goals, as well as helping his side to FA Cup success in 1905 with his Man of the Match display. During his time at Villa, Billy was regarded as one of the great utility players of the game despite his ability to score goals.

In 1906, Garraty lost his place in the Villa line up and made only a handful of appearances before signing for Leicester Fosse in 1908. Garraty failed to find the net in six appearances and the Foxes suffered relegation at the end of the season.

The remainder of Garraty's league career was spent in the second division with two years at West Bromwich Albion followed by his final season before retirement in 1910–11 with Lincoln City.

== Personal life ==
Garraty is the great-great-grandfather of footballer Jack Grealish, who played for and captained Aston Villa and also related to James Burke who plays for Glades. William Billy Garraty was caught poaching with two others in 1904 0n an estate and they were all charged 20 shillings. After William Garratys football career he became a delivery driver and soon after became the owner of a pub which is now one of the oldest pubs in the UK.

== Honours ==
Aston Villa

- First Division: 1899–1900
- FA Cup: 1904–05
- Sheriff of London Charity Shield: 1901
