= Joe Bache =

English footballer (1880–1960)

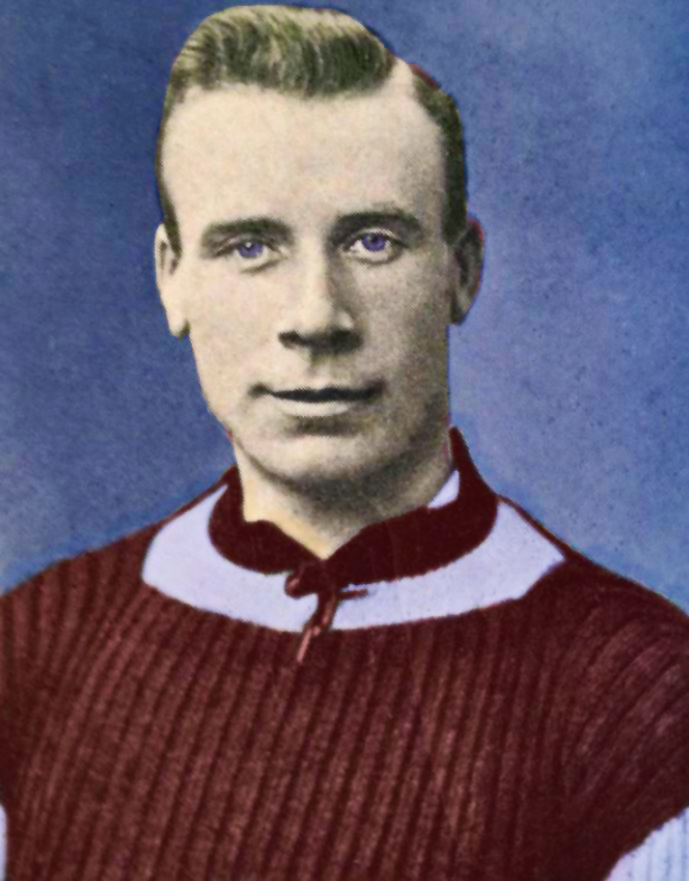

Personal information
- Full name: Joseph William Bache
- Date of birth: 8 February 1880
- Place of birth: Stourbridge, England
- Date of death: 10 November 1960 (aged 80)
- Position: Inside forward

Youth career
- 1898–1899: Bewdley Victoria
- 1899–1900: Stourbridge Football Club

Senior career*
Years	Team	Apps	(Gls)
1900–1914	Aston Villa	431	(167)
1919–1920	Mid Rhondda		
1920	Grimsby Town	5	(1)

International career
1903–1911	England	7	(4)
- * Club domestic league appearances and goals

Joseph William Bache (8 February 1880 – 10 November 1960), was an English footballer who was a prolific centre forward for Aston Villa between 1900 and 1919. He was one of the Club's all-time greatest forwards, winning an FA Cup winners medal in both 1905 and 1913, and was also a vital part of the Villa team that won the League Championship in the 1909-10 season. Bache appeared for the team 474 times and had scored a total of 185 goals at the end of his career. He played for the England national team seven times, and during that period scored four goals for his country, one in each of his first four appearances.

Bache joined the Royal Garrison Artillery during the First World War and went on to serve on the Western Front, where he rose to the rank of Lance-Corporal. Despite being involved in a number of actions, Bache survived the war and returned home after the 1918 armistice to resume his playing career.

After spending 1919–20 in South Wales with Mid Rhondda, Bache made a brief comeback as player/coach for Grimsby Town in 1920, playing five games, scoring once.

His son, David Bache became a famous car designer, producing many designs, mainly for Rover. David was born in Mannheim, Germany, where Joe was coaching following his retirement.

== Honours ==
Aston Villa

- FA Cup winners 1905, 1913
- League Champions 1909–10
