= List of Scotland national rugby league team players =

The Scotland national rugby league team represents the nation of Scotland in international rugby league. It is administered by Scotland Rugby League, the governing body of rugby league in Scotland, and competes as a member of the Rugby League European Federation (RLEF), which encompasses the countries of Europe. The team played its first match on 13 August 1995 against Ireland and was given full international status in 1996. Since its first competitive match, more than 150 players have made at least one international appearance for the team.

== Notable Scottish players ==
=== Scotland's Great Britain Rugby League Internationals ===
- Roy Kinnear, for Great Britain (RL): 1-cap, for Great Britain (RU): ?-caps, for Scotland (RU) while at Heriot's Rugby Club (RU) 1926 3-caps, for Other Nationalities: 3-caps (signed for Wigan 1926–27)
- Alan Tait, for Great Britain (RL): 16-caps, for Great Britain (RU): 2-caps, for Scotland (RU) while at Kelso RFC? (RU) 27-caps, for Scotland (RL): 4-caps (signed for Widnes 1988)
- Andrew Hogg, for Great Britain (England/Northern Union aka RFL) (RL) while at Broughton ?-caps, for Other Nationalities while at Broughton ?-caps
- David Rose, for Great Britain (RL): ?-caps, for Scotland (RU) while at Jed-Forest RFC (RU) 1951–53 7-caps (signed for Leeds 1953–54)
- Dave Valentine (Rob Valentine's older brother) (Testimonial match 1956), for Great Britain (RL) while at Huddersfield 15-caps (World Cup 1954 Captain 4-caps), for Scotland (RU) while at Hawick RFC (RU) 1947 2-caps, for Other Nationalities while at Huddersfield circa-1951 16-caps (signed for Huddersfield 1947–48)
- George 'Happy' Wilson for Great Britain (RL) while at Workington 1951 New Zealand ?-caps, for Scotland (RU) while at Team? 1947 3-caps, for Other Nationalities: ?-caps (signed for Workington date?)
- George Fairbairn, for Great Britain (RL) while at Wigan 1977 France, New Zealand, Australia x 2; 1978 Australia x 3; 1979 Australia x 2, New Zealand x 3; 1980 New Zealand x 2; Hull Kingston Rovers. 1981 France; 1982 Australia x 2, for England (RL) while at Wigan 1975 Wales x 2, New Zealand x 2, Australia x 2, France, Papua New Guinea; 1977 Wales, France; 1978 France; 1980 Wales, France; 1981 France, Wales; Hull Kingston Rovers. Wales
- Hugh Waddell, for Great Britain (RL) while at Oldham 1988 France x 2, Australia, New Zealand; Leeds 1989 France, for Scotland (RL): ?-caps, for England (RL) while at Blackpool 1984 Wales
- Billy McGinty, for Great Britain (RL): ?-caps, for Scotland Nines (RL): ?-caps
- Dale Laughton, for Great Britain (RL): ?-caps, for Scotland (RL): ?-caps
- Rob Valentine (Dave Valentine's younger brother), for Great Britain (RL) while at Huddersfield 1967 Australia 1-cap, for South of Scotland (RU) while at Hawick RFC (RU) 1963 3-caps, for Other Nationalities while at Keighley 1975 Lancashire (1 or 2)-caps (signed for Huddersfield 11/1963)
- Andrew "Drew" Turnbull, for Great Britain (RL): 1-cap
- Charles "Charlie" Renilson, for Great Britain (RL): 8-caps
- Lee Gilmour, for Great Britain (RL): ?-caps, for Scotland (RL): ?-caps
- Richard Horne, for Great Britain (RL): ?-caps, for Scotland (RL): ?-caps

Roy Kinnear, David Rose, Alan Tait, Dave Valentine, and George Wilson; all played for both Great Britain (RL) and Scotland (RU).

=== Scotland (RU) Internationals who moved to Rugby league ===
- Alex Laidlaw, for Scotland (RU) while at Hawick RFC (RU) 1897 1-cap (signed for Bradford 1898–99)
- Anthony Little, for Scotland (RU) while at Hawick RFC (RU) 1905 1-cap (signed for Wigan 1905–06)
- George Douglas, for Scotland (RU) while at Jed-Forest RFC (RU) 1921 1-cap (signed for Batley 1921–22)
- Roy Kinnear, for Scotland (RU) while at Heriot's Rugby Club (RU) 1926 3-caps (signed for Wigan 1926–27)
- William Welsh, for Scotland (RU) while at Hawick RFC (RU) 1927–33 21-cap (signed for London Highfield 1933–34)
- Gordon Cottington, for Scotland (RU) while at Kelso RFC (RU) 1934–36 5-caps (signed Castleford 1936–37)
- Gordon Gray, for Scotland (RU) while at Gala RFC (RU) 1935–37 4-caps (signed for Huddersfield 1937–38)
- Dave Valentine, for Scotland (RU) while at Hawick RFC (RU) 1947 2-caps (signed for Huddersfield 1947–48)
- Thomas Wright, for Scotland (RU) while at Hawick RFC (RU) 1947 1-cap (signed for Leeds 1948–49)
- David Rose, for Scotland (RU) while at Jed-Forest RFC (RU) 1951–53 7-caps (signed for Huddersfield 1953–54)
- Hugh Duffy for Scotland (RU) while at Jed-Forest RFC (RU) 1955 1-cap (signed for Salford 1954–55)
- Brian Shillinglaw, for Scotland (RU) while at Gala RFC (RU) 1960–61 5-caps (signed for Whitehaven 1961–62)
- Ronald "Ron" Cowan, for Scotland (RU) while at Selkirk RFC (RU) 1961–62 5-caps (signed for Leeds 1962–63)
- Alan Tait, for Scotland (RU) while at Kelso RFC? (RU) 27-caps (signed for Widnes 1988)
- Jon Steel, for Scotland (RU) while at Border Reivers (RU) ?-caps

=== South of Scotland District (RU) players who moved to Rugby league ===
- George 'Happy' Wilson, for South of Scotland District (RU) while at Team? 1947 3-caps (signed for Workington date?)
- Rob Valentine, for South of Scotland District (RU) while at Hawick RFC (RU) 1953 3-caps (signed for Huddersfield 11/1963)

=== Scotland (RL) Internationals who went on to play for Scotland (RU) ===
- Andy Craig
- George Graham
- James "Jim" McLaren
- Gareth Morton

== Players ==
Statistics correct as of 8 January 2021

Number	Name	Caps	Tries	Goals	DGs	Points	Date of début	Opposition	Date of last game	Opposition
1	Alasdair Blee	5	2	0	0	8	13 Aug 1995	Ireland	6 Aug 1996	Ireland
2	Mark Burns	4	0	0	0	0	13 Aug 1995	Ireland	20 Oct 1995	Cook Islands
3	John Coumbe-Lilley	1	0	0	0	0	13 Aug 1995	Ireland	13 Aug 1995	Ireland
4	Sean Cusack	4	1	0	0	4	13 Aug 1995	Ireland	6 Aug 1996	Ireland
5	Billy Gamba	5	0	0	0	0	13 Aug 1995	Ireland	6 Aug 1996	Ireland
6	Martin Ketteridge	4	1	5	0	14	13 Aug 1995	Ireland	6 Aug 1996	Ireland
7	Gavin Manclark	3	2	0	0	8	13 Aug 1995	Ireland	20 Oct 1995	Cook Islands
8	Gary Murdock	2	0	0	0	0	13 Aug 1995	Ireland	6 Aug 1996	Ireland
9	Darren Shaw	12	0	0	0	0	13 Aug 1995	Ireland	3 Jul 2001	France
10	Darrall Shelford	5	5	0	0	20	13 Aug 1995	Ireland	6 Aug 1996	Ireland
11	Steve Tait	3	0	0	0	0	13 Aug 1995	Ireland	20 Oct 1995	Cook Islands
12	Graeme Thompson	5	1	7	0	18	13 Aug 1995	Ireland	6 Aug 1996	Ireland
13	Hugh Waddell	4	1	0	0	4	13 Aug 1995	Ireland	20 Oct 1995	Cook Islands
14	Struan Douglas	2	0	0	0	0	13 Aug 1995	Ireland	18 Oct 1995	United States
15	Neil Hendry	1	0	0	0	0	13 Aug 1995	Ireland	13 Aug 1995	Ireland
16	Andy Knight	1	0	0	0	0	13 Aug 1995	Ireland	13 Aug 1995	Ireland
17	Iain Stanger	2	0	0	0	0	13 Aug 1995	Ireland	16 Oct 1995	Russia
18	James Walker	1	0	0	0	0	13 Aug 1995	Ireland	13 Aug 1995	Ireland
19	Graham Cameron	2	0	0	0	0	16 Oct 1995	Russia	18 Oct 1995	United States
20	James Howe	3	2	0	0	8	16 Oct 1995	Russia	20 Oct 1995	Cook Islands
21	Charlie McAlister	3	0	4	0	8	16 Oct 1995	Russia	20 Oct 1995	Cook Islands
22	Mike Rush	2	0	0	0	0	16 Oct 1995	Russia	18 Oct 1995	United States
23	Alan Tait	4	5	0	0	20	16 Oct 1995	Russia	6 Aug 1996	Ireland
24	Stuart McCarthy	3	1	0	0	4	16 Oct 1995	Russia	9 Jul 1997	France
25	Mark Smith	3	1	0	0	4	16 Oct 1995	Russia	20 Oct 1995	Cook Islands
26	Alex Killen	2	0	0	0	0	18 Oct 1995	United States	20 Oct 1995	Cook Islands
27	James Cowan	1	0	0	0	0	6 Aug 1996	Ireland	6 Aug 1996	Ireland
28	Matt Crowther	8	3	19	0	50	6 Aug 1996	Ireland	3 Jul 2001	France
29	Mark Keenan	1	0	0	0	0	6 Aug 1996	Ireland	6 Aug 1996	Ireland
30	Nick Mardon	2	1	0	0	4	6 Aug 1996	Ireland	9 Jul 1997	France
31	Lee Milner	1	0	0	0	0	6 Aug 1996	Ireland	6 Aug 1996	Ireland
32	Danny Russell	9	4	0	0	16	6 Aug 1996	Ireland	5 Nov 2000	Samoa
33	Scott Gilmour	1	0	0	0	0	6 Aug 1996	Ireland	6 Aug 1996	Ireland
34	Jason Syme	1	0	0	0	0	6 Aug 1996	Ireland	6 Aug 1996	Ireland
35	Glenn Bell	1	0	0	0	0	9 Jul 1997	France	9 Jul 1997	France
36	Paul Carr	1	0	0	0	0	9 Jul 1997	France	9 Jul 1997	France
37	Gary Christie	1	1	0	0	4	9 Jul 1997	France	9 Jul 1997	France
38	John Duffy	12	1	7	0	18	9 Jul 1997	France	29 Oct 2011	France
39	Dale Laughton	4	0	0	0	0	9 Jul 1997	France	5 Nov 2000	Samoa
40	Jim McLaren	1	0	0	0	0	9 Jul 1997	France	9 Jul 1997	France
41	Jon Neill	2	0	0	0	0	9 Jul 1997	France	31 Oct 1999	Ireland
42	Pehi James Solomon	5	0	0	0	0	9 Jul 1997	France	9 Nov 2003	France
43	Phil Veivers	1	0	0	0	0	9 Jul 1997	France	9 Jul 1997	France
44	Mike Dixon	3	0	0	0	0	9 Jul 1997	France	3 Jul 2001	France
45	Andrew Duncan	1	0	0	0	0	9 Jul 1997	France	9 Jul 1997	France
46	Iain Higgins	2	0	0	0	0	9 Jul 1997	France	3 Jul 2001	France
47	Danny McKelvie	1	0	0	0	0	9 Jul 1997	France	9 Jul 1997	France
48	Danny Arnold	9	8	0	0	32	11 Nov 1998	France	9 Nov 2003	France
49	Joe Berry	7	0	0	0	0	11 Nov 1998	France	9 Nov 2003	France
50	Logan Campbell	2	1	0	0	4	11 Nov 1998	France	18 Nov 1998	Ireland
51	Jason Flowers	3	0	0	0	0	11 Nov 1998	France	3 Jul 2001	France
52	Nathan Graham	10	0	0	0	0	11 Nov 1998	France	29 Oct 2004	Ireland
53	Chris Orr	2	0	0	0	0	11 Nov 1998	France	18 Nov 1998	Ireland
54	Lee Penny	5	3	0	0	12	11 Nov 1998	France	9 Nov 2003	France
55	Jason Roach	8	4	0	0	16	11 Nov 1998	France	29 Oct 2004	Ireland
56	Mike Wainwright	5	1	0	0	4	11 Nov 1998	France	16 Oct 2005	Wales
57	Gareth Hewitt	1	0	0	0	0	11 Nov 1998	France	11 Nov 1998	France
58	Simon Knox	4	0	0	0	0	11 Nov 1998	France	9 Nov 2003	France
59	Graeme Shaw	2	0	0	0	0	11 Nov 1998	France	18 Nov 1998	Ireland
60	Colin Wilson	2	0	0	0	0	11 Nov 1998	France	18 Nov 1998	Ireland
61	Paul Anderson	2	0	0	0	0	22 Oct 1999	Wales	31 Oct 1999	Ireland
62	Andy Craig	2	0	0	0	0	22 Oct 1999	Wales	31 Oct 1999	Ireland
63	Scott Cram	6	0	0	0	0	22 Oct 1999	Wales	3 Jul 2001	France
64	David Maiden	6	2	0	0	8	22 Oct 1999	Wales	3 Jul 2001	France
65	Wayne McDonald	8	0	0	0	0	22 Oct 1999	Wales	9 Nov 2003	France
66	Scott Rhodes	4	1	0	0	4	22 Oct 1999	Wales	3 Jul 2001	France
67	Andrew Lambert	2	2	0	0	8	22 Oct 1999	Wales	31 Oct 1999	Ireland
68	Neil Lowe	16	1	0	0	4	22 Oct 1999	Ireland	29 Oct 2011	France
69	Geoff Bell	3	1	0	0	4	29 Oct 2000	Aotearoa Māori	5 Nov 2000	Samoa
70	Mat Daylight	3	0	0	0	0	29 Oct 2000	Aotearoa Māori	5 Nov 2000	Samoa
71	Lee Gilmour	3	0	0	0	0	29 Oct 2000	Aotearoa Māori	5 Nov 2000	Samoa
72	Daniel Heckenberg	3	0	0	0	0	29 Oct 2000	Aotearoa Māori	5 Nov 2000	Samoa
73	Richard Horne	3	0	0	0	0	29 Oct 2000	Aotearoa Māori	5 Nov 2000	Samoa
74	Scott Logan	6	0	0	0	0	29 Oct 2000	Aotearoa Māori	8 Nov 2008	Tonga
75	Graham Mackay	1	0	1	0	2	29 Oct 2000	Aotearoa Māori	29 Oct 2000	Aotearoa Māori
76	Andrew Purcell	2	0	0	0	0	29 Oct 2000	Aotearoa Māori	5 Nov 2000	Samoa
77	Adrian Vowles	4	1	0	0	4	29 Oct 2000	Aotearoa Māori	3 Jul 2001	France
78	Richard Fletcher	9	2	0	0	8	3 Jul 2001	France	8 Nov 2009	Wales
79	Ryan McDonald	2	0	0	0	0	3 Jul 2001	France	23 Oct 2005	Ireland
80	Gareth Morton	5	0	5	0	10	3 Jul 2001	France	5 Nov 2008	Fiji
81	Andrew Henderson	23	4	0	0	16	26 Oct 2003	Ireland	15 Nov 2013	New Zealand
82	Dave McConnell	9	2	0	0	8	26 Oct 2003	Ireland	8 Nov 2008	Tonga
83	Iain Morrison	8	0	0	0	0	26 Oct 2003	Ireland	1 Nov 2009	Lebanon
84	Damien Reid	1	0	0	0	0	26 Oct 2003	Ireland	26 Oct 2003	Ireland
85	Oliver Wilkes	18	2	2	0	12	26 Oct 2003	Ireland	10 Nov 2018	France
86	Jack Howieson	11	0	0	0	0	26 Oct 2003	Ireland	14 Oct 2012	Ireland
87	Spencer Miller	5	2	0	0	8	26 Oct 2003	Ireland	29 Oct 2006	Wales
88	Matthew Tunstall	4	0	0	0	0	26 Oct 2003	Ireland	29 Oct 2004	Ireland
89	Lee Kiddie	1	0	0	0	0	9 Nov 2003	France	9 Nov 2003	France
90	James Houston	1	0	0	0	0	9 Nov 2003	France	9 Nov 2003	France
91	Jamie Bloem	2	0	2	0	4	24 Oct 2004	Wales	29 Oct 2004	Ireland
92	Danny Brough	25	4	59	2	136	24 Oct 2004	Wales	4 Nov 2017	New Zealand
93	Iain Marsh	7	0	0	0	0	24 Oct 2004	Wales	4 Nov 2007	Wales
94	Andy McPhail	4	1	0	0	4	24 Oct 2004	Wales	23 Oct 2005	Ireland
95	Alex Szostak	18	1	0	0	4	24 Oct 2004	Wales	15 Nov 2013	New Zealand
96	Chris Birchall	2	0	0	0	0	24 Oct 2004	Wales	29 Oct 2004	Ireland
97	Andy Brown	3	0	0	0	0	24 Oct 2004	Wales	16 Oct 2005	Wales
98	Pete Shaw	1	0	0	0	0	24 Oct 2004	Wales	24 Oct 2004	Wales
99	Duncan MacGillivray	5	0	0	0	0	29 Oct 2004	Ireland	8 Nov 2008	Tonga
100	Ian Sinfield	3	0	0	0	0	29 Oct 2004	Ireland	29 Oct 2006	Wales
101	Dougie Flockhart	2	0	0	0	0	16 Oct 2005	Wales	23 Oct 2005	Ireland
102	Wade Liddell	7	1	0	0	4	16 Oct 2005	Wales	8 Nov 2008	Tonga
103	Jon Steel	10	4	0	0	16	16 Oct 2005	Wales	16 Oct 2010	France
104	Ben Fisher	16	7	0	0	28	16 Oct 2005	Wales	3 Nov 2013	Italy
105	Nick Surtees	2	0	0	0	0	16 Oct 2005	Wales	23 Oct 2005	Ireland
106	Mick Nanyn	10	6	24	0	72	16 Oct 2005	Wales	8 Nov 2009	Wales
107	Jamie Benn	7	5	0	0	20	29 Oct 2006	Wales	10 Oct 2010	Wales
108	Ian Henderson	8	0	0	0	0	29 Oct 2006	Wales	15 Nov 2013	New Zealand
109	Paul Jackson	4	0	0	0	0	29 Oct 2006	Wales	5 Nov 2008	Fiji
110	Dene Miller	1	0	0	0	0	29 Oct 2006	Wales	29 Oct 2006	Wales
111	Richie Hawkyard	1	0	0	0	0	27 Oct 2007	France	27 Oct 2007	France
112	Kevin Henderson	11	4	0	0	16	27 Oct 2007	France	24 Oct 2010	Ireland
113	David Lynn	2	0	0	0	0	27 Oct 2007	France	4 Nov 2007	Wales
114	Lee Paterson	12	3	4	0	20	27 Oct 2007	France	28 Oct 2012	England Knights
115	Andy Todd	2	0	0	0	0	27 Oct 2007	France	4 Nov 2007	Wales
116	Mark Slatter	1	0	0	0	0	27 Oct 2007	France	27 Oct 2007	France
117	Michael Robertson	3	1	0	0	4	26 Oct 2008	France	8 Nov 2008	Tonga
118	Dean Colton	1	0	0	0	0	26 Oct 2008	France	26 Oct 2008	France
119	Gavin Cowan	2	0	0	0	0	26 Oct 2008	France	8 Nov 2008	Tonga
120	Chris Armit	3	0	0	0	0	26 Oct 2008	France	8 Nov 2008	Tonga
121	Paddy Coupar	9	1	0	0	4	8 Nov 2008	Tonga	29 Oct 2011	France
122	Brendan Lindsay	6	1	1	0	6	17 Oct 2009	Italy	24 Oct 2010	Ireland
123	Gareth Moore	3	1	2	0	8	17 Oct 2009	Italy	8 Nov 2009	Wales
124	James Nixon	3	5	0	0	20	17 Oct 2009	Italy	8 Nov 2009	Wales
125	Mitchell Stringer	12	3	0	0	12	17 Oct 2009	Italy	7 Nov 2013	United States
126	John Cox	3	1	0	0	4	17 Oct 2009	Italy	8 Nov 2009	Wales
127	Rob Lunt	4	0	0	0	0	17 Oct 2009	Italy	16 Oct 2010	France
128	Sam Barlow	10	1	0	0	4	10 Oct 2010	Wales	15 Nov 2013	New Zealand
129	Dale Ferguson	19	5	0	0	20	10 Oct 2010	Wales	1 Nov 2019	Greece
130	Joe Wardle	6	1	0	0	4	10 Oct 2010	Wales	31 Oct 2014	France
131	Dave Arnot	4	1	0	0	4	16 Oct 2010	France	29 Oct 2011	France
132	Brett Carter	6	2	0	0	8	24 Oct 2010	Ireland	29 Oct 2013	Tonga
133	Alex Hurst	12	4	1	0	18	16 Oct 2011	Ireland	31 Oct 2014	France
134	Crawford Matthews	2	0	0	0	0	16 Oct 2011	Ireland	29 Oct 2011	France
135	Josh Barlow	8	1	0	0	4	16 Oct 2011	Ireland	31 Oct 2014	France
136	David Scott	18	9	10	0	56	16 Oct 2011	Ireland	1 Nov 2019	Greece
137	Jack Stearman	1	0	0	0	0	16 Oct 2011	Ireland	16 Oct 2011	Ireland
138	Callum Cockburn	4	1	0	0	0	16 Oct 2011	Ireland	28 Oct 2012	England Knights
139	Michael Stewart	2	0	0	0	0	16 Oct 2011	Ireland	29 Oct 2011	France
140	Giles Lomax	1	0	0	0	0	16 Oct 2011	Ireland	16 Oct 2011	Ireland
141	Ben Hellewell	19	5	0	0	20	29 Oct 2011	France	26 Oct 2019	Serbia
142	Jordan Rice	1	0	0	0	0	29 Oct 2011	France	29 Oct 2011	France
143	Nick Broere	1	0	0	0	0	29 Oct 2011	France	29 Oct 2011	France
144	Shae Lyon-Fraser	1	0	0	0	0	14 Oct 2012	Ireland	14 Oct 2012	Ireland
145	Liam Hood	7	1	0	0	4	14 Oct 2012	Ireland	11 Nov 2016	New Zealand
146	Adam Walker	15	1	0	0	4	14 Oct 2012	Ireland	26 Oct 2019	Serbia
147	Jonathan Walker	8	2	0	0	8	14 Oct 2012	Ireland	4 Nov 2017	New Zealand
148	Brett Phillips	9	3	0	0	8	28 Oct 2012	England Knights	5 Nov 2016	New Zealand
149	Craig Borthwick	2	0	0	0	0	28 Oct 2012	England Knights	2 Nov 2018	Wales
150	Matty Russell	12	5	0	0	20	19 Oct 2013	Papua New Guinea	11 Nov 2017	Samoa
151	Danny Addy	18	6	5	0	34	19 Oct 2013	Papua New Guinea	26 Oct 2019	Serbia
152	Ben Kavanagh	21	6	0	0	8	19 Oct 2013	Papua New Guinea	1 Nov 2019	Greece
153	Luke Douglas	13	2	1	0	10	19 Oct 2013	Papua New Guinea	1 Nov 2019	Greece
154	Callum Phillips	7	2	0	0	8	19 Oct 2013	Papua New Guinea	11 Nov 2017	Samoa
155	Kane Linnett	7	2	0	0	8	19 Oct 2013	Papua New Guinea	11 Nov 2016	New Zealand
156	Peter Wallace	4	0	0	0	0	29 Oct 2013	Tonga	15 Nov 2013	New Zealand
157	Oscar Thomas	12	4	5	0	26	17 Oct 2014	Wales	1 Nov 2019	Greece
158	Nathan Massey	3	0	0	0	0	17 Oct 2014	Wales	31 Oct 2014	France
159	Corbyn Kilday	5	1	0	0	4	17 Oct 2014	Wales	23 Oct 2015	Ireland
160	Sonny Esslemont	6	0	0	0	0	17 Oct 2014	Wales	7 Nov 2015	France
161	Louis Senter	3	0	0	0	0	17 Oct 2014	Wales	25 Oct 2014	France
162	Joe McClean	6	0	0	0	0	25 Oct 2014	Ireland	1 Nov 2019	Greece
163	Harvey Burnett	4	0	0	0	0	31 Oct 2014	France	7 Nov 2015	France
164	Alex Walker	6	0	0	0	0	16 Oct 2015	Wales	1 Nov 2019	Greece
165	Richard Harris	3	0	0	0	0	16 Oct 2015	Wales	7 Nov 2015	France
166	Scott Plumridge	2	0	0	0	0	16 Oct 2015	Wales	7 Nov 2015	France
167	Shane Toal	3	2	0	0	8	23 Oct 2015	Ireland	11 Nov 2017	Samoa
168	Lewis Clarke	5	0	0	0	0	23 Oct 2015	Ireland	10 Nov 2018	France
169	Sam Brooks	5	0	0	0	0	7 Nov 2015	France	4 Nov 2017	New Zealand
170	Gavin Grant	1	0	0	0	0	7 Nov 2015	France	7 Nov 2015	France
171	Finlay Hutchison	2	0	0	0	0	7 Nov 2015	France	27 Oct 2018	Ireland
172	Lachlan Coote	3	0	0	0	0	28 Oct 2016	Australia	11 Nov 2016	New Zealand
173	Lewis Tierney	6	2	0	0	8	28 Oct 2016	Australia	11 Nov 2017	Samoa
174	Euan Aitken	3	1	0	0	4	28 Oct 2016	Australia	11 Nov 2016	New Zealand
175	Ryan Brierley	7	4	19	0	54	28 Oct 2016	Australia	1 Nov 2019	Greece
176	Sheldon Powe-Hobbs	1	0	0	0	0	28 Oct 2016	Australia	28 Oct 2016	Australia
177	Billy McConnachie	4	0	0	0	0	28 Oct 2016	Australia	2 Nov 2018	Wales
178	Frankie Mariano	7	1	0	0	4	5 Nov 2016	England	10 Nov 2018	France
179	Tyler Cassel	1	0	0	0	0	5 Nov 2016	England	5 Nov 2016	England
180	Lachlan Stein	3	0	0	0	0	29 Oct 2017	Tonga	11 Nov 2017	Samoa
181	Will Oakes	5	4	0	0	16	29 Oct 2017	Tonga	1 Nov 2019	Greece
182	Kane Bentley	6	0	0	0	0	29 Oct 2017	Tonga	10 Nov 2018	France
183	James Bell	5	1	0	0	4	29 Oct 2017	Tonga	10 Nov 2018	France
184	Andrew Bentley	2	0	0	0	0	29 Oct 2017	Tonga	11 Nov 2017	Samoa
185	Jarred Anderson	2	0	0	0	0	4 Nov 2017	New Zealand	11 Nov 2017	Samoa
186	Brandan Wilkinson	2	0	0	0	0	4 Nov 2017	New Zealand	11 Nov 2017	Samoa
187	Murray Mitchell	2	0	0	0	0	27 Oct 2018	Ireland	2 Nov 2018	Wales
188	Davey Dixon	5	2	0	0	8	27 Oct 2018	Ireland	1 Nov 2019	Greece
189	Nick Glohe	5	2	0	0	8	27 Oct 2018	Ireland	1 Nov 2019	Greece
190	Sam Luckley	4	0	0	0	0	27 Oct 2018	Ireland	1 Nov 2019	Greece
191	Kieran Moran	4	0	0	0	0	27 Oct 2018	Ireland	1 Nov 2019	Greece
192	Luke Westman	1	0	0	0	0	27 Oct 2018	Ireland	27 Oct 2018	Ireland
193	Craig Robertson	2	1	0	0	4	2 Nov 2018	Wales	10 Nov 2018	France
194	Niall Sidney	1	0	0	0	0	10 Nov 2018	France	10 Nov 2018	France
195	Matt Hogg	3	0	0	0	0	10 Nov 2018	France	1 Nov 2019	Greece
196	Dan Turland	3	1	0	0	4	10 Nov 2018	France	1 Nov 2019	Greece
197	Hamish Bentley	1	0	0	0	0	10 Nov 2018	France	10 Nov 2018	France
198	Callum McLelland	2	3	0	0	12	26 Oct 2019	Serbia	1 Nov 2019	Greece
199	Liam Faughlin	1	0	0	0	0	1 Nov 2019	Greece	1 Nov 2019	Greece

== See also ==
- List of Great Britain national rugby league team players
- Scotland national rugby league team match results
- Scotland A national rugby league team
