= List of Durham Cricket Board List A players =

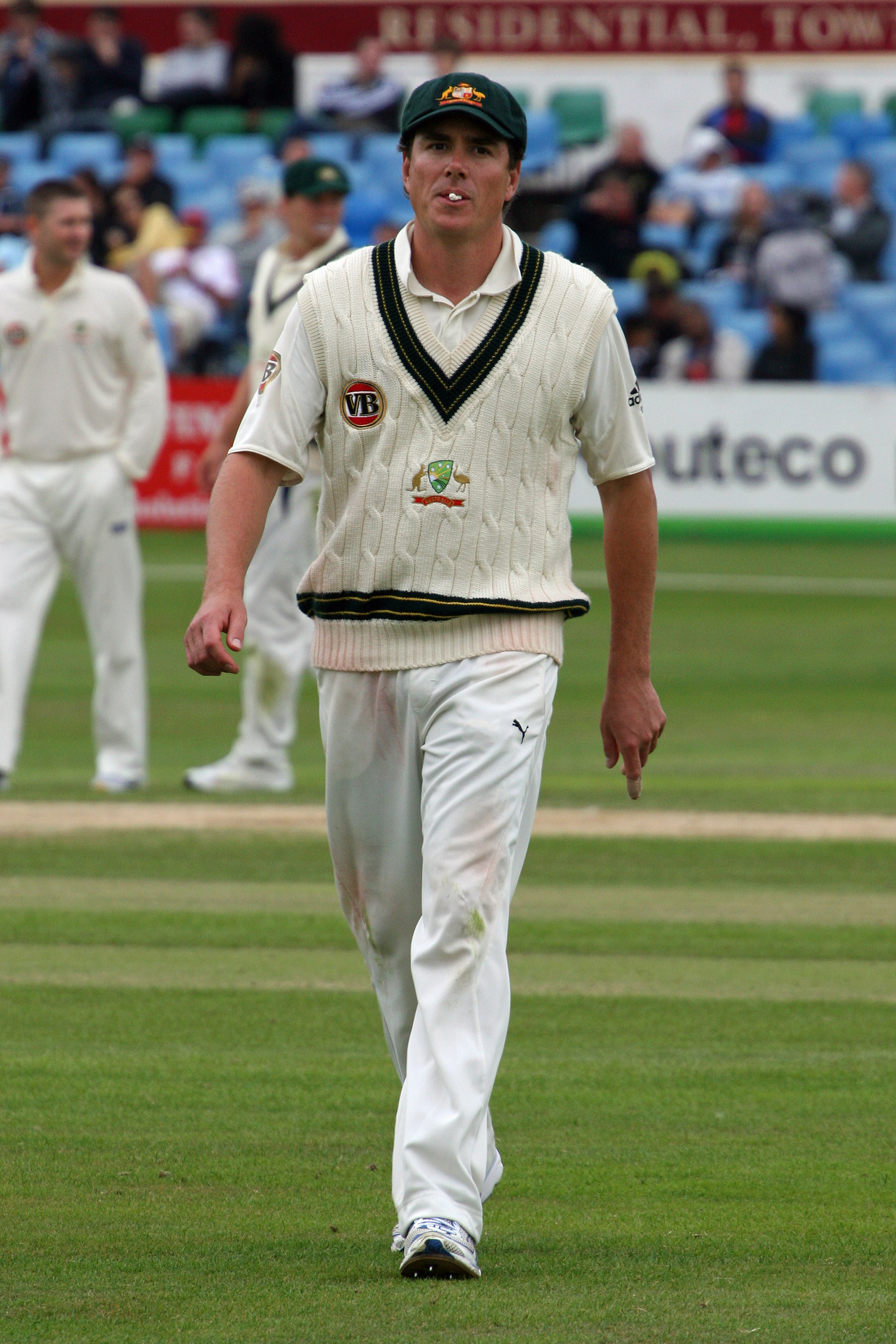
Marcus North has the best bowling figures for the Durham Cricket Board.

The Durham Cricket Board (DCB) team competed in List A cricket from 1999 until 2003, taking part in the England and Wales Cricket Board's main knock-out trophy, known as the NatWest Trophy and then Cheltenham & Gloucester Trophy while the DCB played in it. Established as the Gillette Cup in 1963, the knock-out trophy expanded from 32 teams to 60 teams in 1999, featuring all of the minor counties, and the Cricket Board teams from the first-class counties. The Cricket Board teams were considered to be roughly equivalent talent to the minor counties, and they all entered in the first or second round, prior to the first-class counties who entered in the third round.

Allan Worthy was the team's highest aggregate run-scorer, accumulating 193 runs for the team, while Gareth Smith took more wickets for the DCB than any other player, claiming ten during his matches for the team. Gary Scott, who only played for the team three times, scored the team's only century against Herefordshire in 2002,. Future Australian Test cricketer, Marcus North, has the best bowling figures for the team, after taking four wickets against Buckinghamshire in 2001. In all, 36 players have appeared for the DCB, of which 21 have also made first-class cricket appearances.

Players are initially listed in order of appearance, where players made their debut in the same match, they are ordered by batting order.

== Key ==
All statistics apply only to matches played for Durham Cricket Board

General

- ‡ – Captain
- † – Wicket-keeper
- ^{F} – Player has appeared in first-class cricket
- First – Year of debut
- Last – Year of latest match played
- Mat – Number of matches played

Batting

- Inn – Number of innings batted
- NO – Number of innings not out
- Runs – Runs scored
- HS – Highest score
- Avg – Runs scored per dismissal
- * – Batsman remained not out

Bowling

- Balls – Balls bowled
- Wkt – Wickets taken
- BBI – Best bowling in an innings
- Ave – Average runs per wicket
- Eco – Economy rate

Fielding

- Ca – Catches taken
- St – Stumpings effected

== List of players ==
Durham Cricket Board List A players
No.	Name	Nationality	First	Last	Mat	Batting			Bowling				Fielding		Ref(s)
No.	Name	Nationality	First	Last	Mat	Runs	HS	Avg	Balls	Wkt	BBI	Ave	Ca	St	Ref(s)
1	Shaun Birbeck ^{F}	England	1999	2000	6	163	88	27.16	132	3	2/38	26.00	1	0	
2	Paul Burn ^{F}	England	1999	1999	2	36	25	18.00	0	–	–	–	0	0	
3	Adrian Hedley	England	1999	1999	3	54	46	18.00	0	–	–	–	1	0	
4	Andrew Hall ^{F}	South Africa	1999	1999	3	156	78	52.00	144	2	1/19	52.50	1	0	
5	Graham Shaw ‡	England	1999	2000	4	26	14*	8.66	42	2	1/27	32.00	2	0	
6	Gary Brown ‡ ^{F}	England	1999	2001	6	38	15	6.33	0	–	–	–	1	0	
7	Stephen Ball	England	1999	2000	6	80	23	13.33	246	7	3/45	30.14	0	0	
8	Benjamin Usher	England	1999	2000	6	61	32	20.33	230	6	2/30	30.00	0	0	
9	Gareth Smith ^{F}	England	1999	2001	7	20	9*	10.00	348	10	2/35	21.10	1	0	
10	Graeme Bridge ^{F}	England	1999	2000	4	43	19	21.50	212	3	2/36	53.00	1	0	
11	David Sherrington †	England	1999	1999	3	2	2*	–	0	–	–	–	4	1	
12	Christopher Hewison ^{F}	England	1999	1999	2	19	19	9.50	0	–	–	–	1	0	
13	Steven Chapman ^{F}	England	2000	2000	3	129	64	43.00	96	4	3/39	19.00	0	0	
14	Marcus North ‡ ^{F}	Australia	2000	2003	6	171	69*	34.20	264	5	4/26	35.60	2	0	
15	Allan Worthy	England	2000	2003	4	193	74	48.25	0	–	–	–	2	0	
16	Ian Pattison	England	2000	2003	5	68	48*	22.66	150	3	1/25	43.33	3	0	
17	Phil Mustard † ^{F}	England	2000	2003	6	47	33	11.75	0	–	–	–	7	3	
18	Mark Davies ^{F}	England	2000	2001	4	6	6	3.00	168	3	1/11	31.66	0	0	
19	Quentin Hughes ‡ ^{F}	England	2000	2002	4	135	51	33.75	24	0	–	–	2	0	
20	Lee Rushworth	England	2001	2001	1	12	12	12.00	18	0	–	–	0	0	
21	Gary Scott ^{F}	England	2001	2002	3	130	100	43.33	174	4	2/32	26.75	2	0	
22	Stephen Humble	England	2001	2002	2	5	5	2.50	84	5	3/33	12.40	1	0	
23	Ashley Day	England	2001	2002	2	1	1	1.00	114	4	2/32	17.00	0	0	
24	Gary Pratt ^{F}	England	2001	2001	1	32	32	32.00	0	–	–	–	0	0	
25	Christopher Mann	England	2001	2001	1	7	7	7.00	0	–	–	–	1	0	
26	Gordon Muchall ^{F}	England	2001	2001	1	19	19	19.00	12	0	–	–	2	0	
27	Richard Waite	England	2001	2003	2	6	6	3.00	69	4	2/25	18.50	1	0	
28	Ian Hunter ^{F}	England	2001	2003	2	15	13	7.50	114	3	2/45	24.66	1	0	
29	Christopher Dodsley	England	2001	2001	1	1	1*	–	18	0	–	–	0	0	
30	Simon Birtwisle	England	2002	2003	2	35	32	17.50	0	–	–	–	1	0	
31	Jim Allenby ^{F}	Australia	2002	2002	1	4	4	4.00	0	–	–	–	0	0	
32	Nadeem Khan ^{F}	Pakistan	2002	2002	1	5	5	5.00	60	1	1/35	35.00	0	0	
33	David Wilson †	England	2002	2003	2	19	19*	–	0	–	–	–	2	2	
34	Liam Plunkett ^{F}	England	2002	2003	2	3	3	3.00	84	4	3/63	21.75	1	0	
35	Kyle Coetzer ^{F}	Scotland	2003	2003	1	30	30	30.00	0	–	–	–	1	0	
36	Graham Onions ^{F}	England	2003	2003	1	5	5	5.00	60	2	2/59	29.50	0	0	

== See also ==
- Durham Cricket Board
