= 1996 Warrington Wolves season =

- Super League I Rank: 5th
- Challenge Cup: Fifth round
- 1996 record: Wins: 13; draws: 0; losses: 11
- Points scored: For: 605; against: 599

Team information
- Coach: John Dorahy
- Stadium: Wilderspool
List of seasons	1997 →

The 1996 Warrington Wolves season was the 102nd season in the club's rugby league history and the first season in the Super League. Coached by John Dorahy, the Warrington Wolves competed in Super League I and finished in 5th place. The club also reached the fifth round of the Challenge Cup.

== Table ==
Super League I
Pos	Team	Pld	W	D	L	PF	PA	PD	Pts	Qualification or relegation
1	St Helens (C)	22	20	0	2	950	455	+495	40	Qualified for Premiership semi final
2	Wigan	22	19	1	2	902	326	+576	39	Qualified for Premiership semi final
3	Bradford Bulls	22	17	0	5	767	409	+358	34	Qualified for Premiership semi final
4	London Broncos	22	12	1	9	611	462	+149	25	Qualified for Premiership semi final
5	Warrington Wolves	22	12	0	10	569	565	+4	24	
6	Halifax Blue Sox	22	10	1	11	667	576	+91	21	
7	Sheffield Eagles	22	10	0	12	599	730	−131	20	
8	Oldham Bears	22	9	1	12	473	681	−208	19	
9	Castleford Tigers	22	9	0	13	548	599	−51	18	
10	Leeds	22	6	0	16	555	745	−190	12	
11	Paris Saint-Germain	22	3	1	18	398	795	−397	7	
12	Workington Town (R)	22	2	1	19	325	1021	−696	5	Relegated to Division One

Source: Rugby League Project
Rules for classification: 1) Points; 2) Points difference; 3) Number of points scored;
(C) Champions; (R) Relegated

== Squad ==
Statistics include appearances and points in the Super League and Challenge Cup.

Player	Apps	Tries	Goals	DGs	Points
Paul Barrow	10	1	0	0	4
Andrew Bennett	11	1	0	0	4
Gary Chambers	18	0	0	0	0
Paul Cullen	21	3	0	0	12
Andy Currier	2	0	0	0	0
Gareth Davies	3	0	0	0	0
Chris Eckersley	1	0	0	0	0
Salesi Finau	15	4	0	0	16
Mike Ford	5	1	0	0	4
Mark Forster	24	7	0	0	28
Iestyn Harris	18	4	67	2	152
Richard Henare	19	17	0	0	68
Mark Hilton	20	1	0	0	4
Chris Holden	1	0	0	0	0
John Hough	8	2	0	0	8
Paul Hulme	11	2	0	0	8
Mark Jones	22	2	0	0	8
Ronnie Kettlewell	1	0	0	0	0
Ian Knott	17	9	16	0	68
Toa Kohe-Love	22	9	0	0	36
Mateaki Mafi	14	7	0	0	28
Lee Penny	16	6	0	0	24
Jon Roper	17	12	1	0	50
Chris Rudd	24	5	3	0	26
Paul Sculthorpe	24	5	0	0	20
Kelly Shelford	13	3	0	1	13
Warren Stephens	3	0	0	0	0
Phil Sumner	5	0	0	0	0
Willie Swann	16	4	0	0	16
Mike Wainwright	2	0	0	0	0
Kris Watson	13	2	0	0	8
