= David Wilson =

David or Dave Wilson may refer to:

== Arts and media ==
=== Film and television ===
- David Wilson (director), British music video director
- David Wilson (born 1948), birth name of Scottish stage and television actor David Rintoul
- Dave Wilson (director) (1933–2002), American television director
- David C. Wilson (screenwriter), American screenwriter
- David G. Wilson, assistant producer for the James Bond films
- David S. F. Wilson, American director; see Bloodshot

=== Literature ===
- David Henry Wilson (born 1937), English writer
- David Niall Wilson (born 1959), American writer of horror, science fiction and fantasy fiction
- David C. Wilson (screenwriter), American screenwriter

=== Music ===
- David Wilson (director), British music video director
- David Wilson (violinist) (born 1945), American violinist
- David Fenwick Wilson (born 1929), musicologist and organist

=== Other media ===
- David Wilson (artist) (1873–1935), Irish illustrator and painter
- Dave Wilson (radio personality), American radio personality based in Indianapolis

== Criminals ==
- David Wilson (murderer) (died 1998), executed Saint Kitts and Nevis criminal
- David Wilson (sex offender) (born 1984), British criminal

== Military ==
- David Wilson (Royal Marines officer) (born 1949), Royal Marine general
- David Wilson (U.S. Army general)

== Politics ==
=== Canada ===
- Dave Wilson (Cape Breton politician) (born 1955), Canadian politician and former member of the Nova Scotia House of Assembly
- Dave Wilson (Sackville politician) (born 1970), Canadian politician and member of the Nova Scotia House of Assembly
- David Wilson (Manitoba politician) (1858–1927), Irish-born politician in Manitoba, Canada
- David H. Wilson (politician) (1855–1926), politician in Manitoba, Canada

=== New Zealand ===
- David Wilson (parliamentary official) (born 1970), clerk of the New Zealand House of Representatives
- David Wilson (New Zealand Labour Party politician) (1880–1977), New Zealand politician and diplomat
- David Wilson (New Zealand First politician), New Zealand politician

=== United States ===
- David Wilson (Connecticut politician), member of the Connecticut House of Representatives
- David Wilson (New York politician) (1818–1870), New York assemblyman 1852, editor of Twelve Years a Slave
- David John Wilson (1887–1976), judge of the US Customs Court
- David C. Wilson (businessman) (1789–1865), banker railroad executive and mayor of Wilmington, Delaware
- David L. Wilson (born 1950), member of the Delaware House of Representatives
- David S. Wilson (born 1981), American politician

=== Elsewhere ===
- David Wilson, Baron Wilson of Tillyorn (born 1935), British administrator, governor of Hong Kong (1987–1992), diplomat and Sinologist
- Sir David Wilson (governor), British colonial administrator and military officer

== Religion ==
- David Wilson (dean of St Patrick's Cathedral, Dublin) (1871–1957), Irish Anglican priest and hymnist
- David Wilson (dean of Aberdeen and Orkney) (1805–1880)

== Science and academia ==
- David Wilson (criminologist) (born 1957), British criminologist
- David Wilson (university administrator), American academic, President of Morgan State University
- David Gordon Wilson (1928–2019), British-born American professor of engineering
- David Hildebrand Wilson, founder of the Museum of Jurassic Technology
- Sir David M. Wilson (born 1931), British archaeologist and director of the British Museum
- David Sloan Wilson (born 1949), American evolutionary biologist

== Sports ==
=== American football ===
- David Wilson (defensive back) (born 1970), American football defensive back
- David Wilson (running back) (born 1991), American football running back
- Dave Wilson (American football) (born 1959), American football quarterback

=== Association football ===
- David A. Wilson (1875–?), English footballer
- David Wilson (Queen's Park footballer) (1880–1926), Scottish footballer (Queen's Park FC and Scotland)
- David Wilson (footballer, born 1881) (1881–?), Scottish footballer, played for Hearts, Everton, Portsmouth
- Soldier Wilson (David Wilson, 1883–1906), Scottish footballer who played for Leeds City
- David Wilson (footballer, born 1884) (1884–1959), Scotland international footballer; after retiring he was manager for Nelson and Exeter City in England
- David Wilson (footballer, born c. 1908) (1908–1992), English footballer who played for Hamilton Academical and Stranraer in the 1930s
- David Wilson (footballer, born 1923), (1923-2017), Scottish footballer, see List of Bury F.C. players (1–24 appearances)
- Davie Wilson (1939–2022), Scottish footballer, played for Rangers, Dundee United, Dumbarton, Kilmarnock
- Dave Wilson (footballer, born 1942), played for Preston and Liverpool
- Dave Wilson (footballer, born 1944), played for Nottingham Forest, Carlisle United, Grimsby Town, Walsall, Burnley, Chesterfield
- David Wilson (footballer, born 1969), footballer who began his career at Manchester United (1980s)
- David Wilson (Scottish football manager) (born 1974), Scottish football manager of Gibraltar national football team
- David Wilson (footballer, born 1994), Scottish footballer who plays for Partick Thistle

=== Athletics ===
- Dave Wilson (high jumper) (born 1938), English athlete
- David Wilson (hurdler) (born 1951), British hurdler
- David Wilson (hammer thrower) (born 1966), American hammer thrower and shot putter, 1988 and 1989 NCAA runner-up for the UCLA Bruins track and field team
- David Wilson (sprinter) (born 1977), Guamanian sprinter
- David Wilson (triple jumper) (born 1991), American triple jumper, 2011 All-American for the Virginia Tech Hokies track and field team

=== Cricket ===
- David Wilson (New Zealand cricketer) (1914–1989), New Zealand cricketer
- David Wilson (cricketer, born 1917) (1917–2005), English cricketer
- David Wilson (cricketer, born 1966), English cricketer

=== Rugby football ===
- David Wilson (rugby union, born 1967), Australian rugby union footballer
- Dave Wilson (rugby league) (born 1984), British rugby league player
- David Wilson (rugby union, born 1985), English rugby union player

=== Other sports ===
- Dave Wilson (swimmer) (born 1960), American swimmer & silver medalist at the 1984 Olympics
- David Wilson (swimmer) (born 1966), Australian swimmer
- David Wilson (figure skating) (born 1966), Canadian figure skating choreographer

== Other people ==
- David Wilson (hotelier) (1808–1880), hotelier
- Sir David Wilson, 1st Baronet (1855–1930), Scottish landowner and agriculturalist
- David Wilson (barrister) (1879–1965), Australian barrister
- David K. Wilson (1919–2007), American businessman and philanthropist
- W. David Wilson, chair of the Ontario Securities Commission

== Other uses ==
- David Wilson Homes, a Wilson Bowden company

== See also ==
- David Willson (disambiguation)
- Wilson (name)
