= 1997 Warrington Wolves season =

- Super League II Rank: 9th
- Challenge Cup: Quarter final
- 1997 record: Wins: 10; draws: 0; losses: 16
- Points scored: For: 560; against: 726

Team information
- Coach: Darryl van der Velde
- Stadium: Wilderspool

The 1997 Warrington Wolves season was the 103rd season in the club's rugby league history and the second season in the Super League. Coached by Darryl van der Velde, the Warrington Wolves competed in Super League II and finished in 9th place. The club also reached the quarter-final of the Challenge Cup.

== Table ==
Pos	Team	Pld	W	D	L	PF	PA	PD	Pts	Relegation
1	Bradford Bulls (C)	22	20	0	2	769	397	+372	40	
2	London Broncos	22	15	3	4	616	418	+198	33	
3	St Helens	22	14	1	7	592	506	+86	29	
4	Wigan	22	14	0	8	683	398	+285	28	
5	Leeds Rhinos	22	13	1	8	544	463	+81	27	
6	Salford Reds	22	11	0	11	428	495	−67	22	
7	Halifax Blue Sox	22	8	2	12	524	549	−25	18	
8	Sheffield Eagles	22	9	0	13	415	574	−159	18	
9	Warrington Wolves	22	8	0	14	437	647	−210	16	
10	Castleford Tigers	22	5	2	15	334	515	−181	12	
11	Paris Saint-Germain	22	6	0	16	362	572	−210	12	
12	Oldham Bears (R)	22	4	1	17	461	631	−170	9	Relegated to Division One

Source: Rugby League Project
Rules for classification: 1) Points; 2) Points difference; 3) Number of points scored;
(C) Champions; (R) Relegated

== Squad ==
No	Player
1	Lee Penny
2	Mark Forster
3	Toa Kohe-Love
4	Jon Roper
5	Richard Henare
6	Nigel Vagana
7	Willie Swann
9	Martin Dermott
10	Garry Chambers
11	Paul Hulme
12	Tony Tatupu
13	Paul Sculthorpe
14	Paul Cullen
16	Kelly Shelford
17	Chris Rudd
18	George Mann
19	Salesi Finau
20	Mike Wainwright
21	Ian Knott
22	Gareth Davies
23	Warren Stevens
24	Paul Barrow
25	Chris Holden
26	Paul Wingfield
28	Paul Darbyshire
30	Anthony Murray
33	John Duffy
35	John Hough
36	Chris Highton
37	Lee Briers
38	Shaun Geritas
39	Tony Thorniley
40	Liam Bretherton
41	Mark Hilton
42	Richard Eyres
44	Chris Causey
