= Surtees (surname) =

Surtees is a surname derived from Surteys, which was an Anglo-Norman place name, possibly for Upper Teesdale in Durham, or the Surtees family's estate in that area.

== People ==
Notable people with this surname include:

- Allan Surtees (1924–2000), English actor
- Aubone Surtees (1865–1923), English rugby union footballer
- Bruce Surtees (1937–2012), American cinematographer
- Charles Surtees (1823–1906), English politician
- Henry Surtees (1991–2009), British racing driver
- Jack Surtees (1911–1992), English professional footballer
- John Surtees (1934–2017), English Grand Prix motorcycle road racer and Formula One driver
- Nicholas Surtees (born 1977), Scottish rugby player
- Robert Surtees (disambiguation), several people
- Schlitze Surtees (1901–1971), American sideshow performer and actor
- William Surtees (1871–1956), English Anglican bishop
