= 1899–1900 Aston Villa F.C. season =

English football club season

Aston Villa
- Chairman: Frederick Rinder
- Manager: George Ramsay
- First Division: 1st (champions, 5th title)
- FA Cup: Third round
- Top goalscorer: League: Fred Wheldon (11); All: Fred Wheldon (13)
Home colours

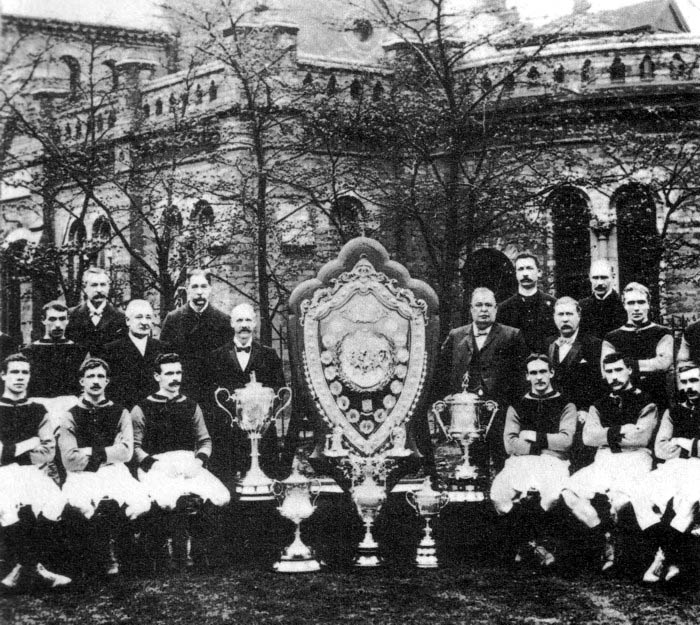
The hugely successful team Ramsay assembled (1899). George Ramsay far left, back row.

First Division
- Champions: Aston Villa, 5th English title
- Relegated: Burnley, Glossop
- Top goalscorer: Billy Garraty (27 goals)
- Biggest home win: Aston Villa 9–0 Glossop (4 September 1899)
- Biggest away win: Preston North End 0–5 Aston Villa (2 December 1899)
- Highest scoring: Aston Villa 9–0 Glossop (4 September 1899)
- Longest winning run: 5 matches Sheffield United
- Longest unbeaten run: 22 matches Sheffield United
- Longest losing run: 8 matches Liverpool
- Highest attendance: 60,000; Aston Villa 4–2 Sunderland (30 December 1899)

The 1899–1900 English football season was Aston Villa's 12th season in the Football League, competing in the First Division, the then top flight of English football. Villa finished the season as Champions for the fifth time extending their record as the most successful League team.

Sheffield United set the pace this season and built up a six-point lead by the end of December. Villa grew stronger towards the end of the season, losing just one game in their last 13, to leave United in second place by two points. Villa finished their programme first, leaving a mathematical chance for the Blades if they scored plenty of goals in the last two games. Their last game at Burnley was lost, leaving Villa champions by two points.

There were debuts for Chris Mann (10), Jim Garfield, Michael Noon, Charlie McEleny and Alf Watkins. Billy Garraty, great-great-grandfather of future-player Jack Grealish, was League top scorer this season. Garraty was a local man, signed from Aston Shakespeare, and just 21 years of age this season. He was an industrious player able to play in almost any position – one of the first great "utility" players. He was capped once by England. He scored 96 goals in 224 League games during his career at Villa.

== Football League ==
| Pos | Team | Pld | W | D | L | GF | GA | GAv | Pts |
|---|---|---|---|---|---|---|---|---|---|
| 1 | Aston Villa (C) | 34 | 22 | 6 | 6 | 77 | 35 | 2.200 | 50 |
| 2 | Sheffield United | 34 | 18 | 12 | 4 | 63 | 33 | 1.909 | 48 |
| 3 | Sunderland | 34 | 19 | 3 | 12 | 50 | 35 | 1.429 | 41 |
| 4 | Wolverhampton Wanderers | 34 | 15 | 9 | 10 | 48 | 37 | 1.297 | 39 |
| 5 | Newcastle United | 34 | 13 | 10 | 11 | 53 | 43 | 1.233 | 36 |

Source: World Football
Rules for classification: 1) Points; 2) Goal average; 3) Goals scored
(C) Champions

Ever-present: Billy George, Fred Wheldon

First at top: 17 Feb

Players used: 21

Glossop's only season in the league's top flight. They would finished in last place and were relegated back to the Second Division; the four matches they won were all at home, against Aston Villa Blackburn, Burnley and Nottingham Forest.

=== Matches ===
| 2 Sep 1899 | Sunderland | 0–1 | Aston Villa | Roker |
| | | Report | Billy Garraty |

| 4 Sep 1899 | Aston Villa | 9–0 | Glossop | Villa Park |
| | Fred Wheldon, Billy Garraty 10’, Steve Smith, Billy Garraty, Fred Wheldon, Charlie Athersmith, Billy Garraty, Billy Garraty, Jack Devey | Report |

| 9 Sep 1899 | Aston Villa | 0–2 | Albion | Villa Park |
| | | Report |

| 16 Sep 1899 | Everton | 1–2 | Aston Villa | Goodison Park |
| | | Report | Fred Wheldon, Billy Garraty |

| 23 Sep 1899 | Aston Villa | 3–1 | Blackburn | Villa Park |
| | Fred Wheldon 30’, Jack Devey (2) | Report |

| 30 Sep 1899 | Derby | 2–0 | Aston Villa | Baseball Ground |
| | | Report |

| 7 Oct 1899 | Aston Villa | 2–1 | Bury | Villa Park |
| | Fred Wheldon, George Johnson | Report |

| 14 Oct 1899 | Notts County | 1–4 | Aston Villa | Trent Bridge |
| | | Report | George Johnson (3), Jack Devey |

| 21 Oct 1899 | Aston Villa | 2–1 | Manchester City | Villa Park |
| | Fred Wheldon (pen), Jack Devey | Report |

| 28 Oct 1899 | Sheffield United | 2–1 | Aston Villa | Bramall Lane |
| | | Report | Jack Devey 23’ |

| 4 Nov 1899 | Aston Villa | 2–1 | Newcastle | Villa Park |
| | Jack Devey 4’, Fred Wheldon | Report |

| 11 Nov 1899 | Aston Villa | 0–0 | Wolves | Villa Park |
| | | Report |

| 13 Nov 1899 | Stoke | 0–2 | Aston Villa | Victoria Ground |
| | | Report | Jim Garfield, Jack Devey |

| 18 Nov 1899 | Liverpool | 3–3 | Aston Villa | Anfield |
| | | Report | Billy Garraty, Jack Devey, Albert Wilkes |

| 25 Nov 1899 | Aston Villa | 2–0 | Burnley | Villa Park |
| | Fred Wheldon 38’, Bobby Templeton | Report |

| 2 Dec 1899 | Preston | 0–5 | Aston Villa | Deepdale |
| | | Report | Billy Garraty 15’, Steve Smith 35’, 3–0 (90’), Own Goal |

| 9 Dec 1899 | Aston Villa | 2–2 | Forest | Villa Park |
| | Billy Garraty (1–1), Jack Devey (2–2) | Report |

| 16 Dec 1899 | Glossop | 1–0 | Aston Villa | North Road |
| | | Report |

| 23 Dec 1899 | Aston Villa | 4–1 | Stoke | Villa Park |
| | Steve Smith 15’, Billy Garraty 22’, Fred Wheldon 47’, 79’ | Report |

| 30 Dec 1899 | Aston Villa | 4–2 | Sunderland | Villa Park |
| | Billy Garraty 25’, 31’, 50’, George Johnson (4–1) | Report |

| 1 Jan 1900 | Bury | 2–0 | Aston Villa | Gigg Lane |
| | | Report |

| 6 Jan 1900 | Albion | 0–2 | Aston Villa | Stoney Lane |
| | | Report | Billy Garraty (40’, 46’) |

| 13 Jan 1900 | Aston Villa | 1–1 | Everton | Villa Park |
| | Charlie Athersmith 75’ | Report |

| 20 Jan 1900 | Blackburn | 0–4 | Aston Villa | Ewood |
| | | Report | Billy Garraty (55’, 2–0), Steve Smith 75’, Charlie Athersmith (4–0) |
Note: GK Billy George, CB Jimmy Cowan CB Michael Noon, FB Albert Evans, FB Howard Spencer, M Albert Wilkes, M Jimmy Crabtree, W Charlie Athersmith, W Steve Smith, CF Billy Garraty, F Fred Wheldon. Crabtree: Assist 75' Assist; Athersmith Assist 55'

| 3 Feb 1900 | Aston Villa | 3–2 | Derby | Villa Park |
| | Billy Garraty (1–2, 84’), Fred Wheldon 89’ | Report |

| 17 Feb 1900 | Aston Villa | 6–2 | Notts County | Villa Park |
| | Billy Garraty 1’, Charlie Athersmith 2’, Jimmy Cowan (3–1), Jack Devey (4–2), Billy Garraty 50’ | Report |

| 3 Mar 1900 | Aston Villa | 1–1 | Sheffield United | Villa Park |
| | Billy Garraty 58’ | Report |

| 10 Mar 1900 | Newcastle | 3–2 | Aston Villa | St James' |
| | | Report | Jack Devey, Billy Garraty |

| 19 Mar 1900 | Manchester City | 0–2 | Aston Villa | Hyde Road |
| | | Report | Fred Wheldon 35’, Fred Wheldon |

| 24 Mar 1900 | Aston Villa | 1–0 | Liverpool | Villa Park |
| | Jack Devey | Report |

| 31 Mar 1900 | Burnley | 1–2 | Aston Villa | Turf Moor |
| | | Report | Fred Wheldon, Jack Devey |

| 7 Apr 1900 | Aston Villa | 3–1 | Preston | Villa Park |
| | Own Goal 1’, Bobby Templeton, Billy Garraty | Report |

| 14 Apr 1900 | Forest | 1–1 | Aston Villa | Town Ground |
| | | Report | Bobby Templeton |

| 16 Apr 1900 | Wolves | 0–1 | Aston Villa | Molineux |
| | | Report | Fred Wheldon 25’ |

Source: avfchistory.co.uk

== FA Cup ==
The first round contained sixteen ties between 32 teams. The matches were played on Saturday, 27 January 1900. Six matches were drawn, with the replays taking place in the following midweek fixture. The Blackburn/Portsmouth match went to a second replay, which was played the following week at Villa Park.

| Tie no | Home team | Score | Away team | Date |
|---|---|---|---|---|
| 14 | Manchester City | 1–1 | Aston Villa | 27 January 1900 |
| Replay | Aston Villa | 3–0 | Manchester City | 31 January 1900 |

The eight second-round matches were scheduled for Saturday, 10 February 1900, although only three games were played on this date. The other five games were played the following Saturday.

| Tie no | Home team | Score | Away team | Date |
|---|---|---|---|---|
| 6 | Aston Villa | 5–1 | Bristol City | 10 February 1900 |

The four Third round quarter final matches were scheduled for Saturday, 24 February 1900. Three of the four matches were replayed in the following midweek fixture, with the Millwall Athletic – Aston Villa match going to a second replay at Elm Park the following week.

| Tie no | Home team | Score | Away team | Date |
|---|---|---|---|---|
| 4 | Millwall Athletic | 1–1 | Aston Villa | 24 February 1900 |
| Replay | Aston Villa | 0–0 | Millwall Athletic | 28 February 1900 |
| Replay | Millwall Athletic | 2–1 | Aston Villa | 5 March 1900 |
