= Graham Shaw =

Graham Shaw may refer to:

- Graham Shaw (musician), Canadian musician and vocalist
- Graham Shaw (footballer, born 1934) (1934–1998), English former footballer
- Graham Shaw (footballer, born 1951), Scottish former footballer
- Graham Shaw (footballer, born 1967), English former footballer and politician
- Graham Shaw (cricketer) (born 1966), former English cricketer
- Graham Shaw (field hockey) (born 1978), former Irish field hockey player and coach

== See also ==
- Graeme Shaw, former professional rugby league footballer
