= Christopher Mann =

Christopher or Chris Mann may refer to:

- Chris Mann (composer) (1949–2018), Australian-American composer and poet
- Chris Mann (poet) (born 1948), South African poet
- Chris Mann (singer) (born 1982), American singer-songwriter
- Chris Mann (footballer) (1875–1962), English footballer
- Christopher Mann (composer) (born 1965), British composer
- Christopher Mann (cricketer) (born 1981), English cricketer
- Chris Mann (politician) (born 1976), American politician and attorney
