= Dene (disambiguation) =

The Dene are an aboriginal group of First Nations in northern Canada.

Dene or Denes may also refer to:

- Dene (valley), a steep-sided valley
- Any number of deneholes
- Dene language, the language of the Dene people
- Dene, Newcastle upon Tyne
- River Dene, in Warwickshire, England

== People ==
=== Given name ===
- Dene Cropper (born 1983), English footballer
- Dene Davies (born 1947), Australian motorcycle speedway rider
- Dene Halatau (born 1983), New Zealand rugby league footballer
- Dene Hills (born 1970), Australian cricketer
- Dene Miller (born 1981), British rugby league footballer
- Dene O'Kane (born 1963), New Zealand snooker player
- Dene Olding (born 1956), Australian violinist
- Dene Shields (born 1982), Scottish footballer
- Dene Simpson (born 1956), South African sprint canoer
- Dene Smuts (1949–2016), South African politician
- Denes Agay (1912–2007), American composer and author

=== Surname ===
- Agnes Denes (born 1931), American conceptual artist
- Dorothy Dene (1859–1899), English stage actress
- Graham Dene (born 1949), British radio personality
- Terry Dene (born 1938), British pop singer

== See also ==
- Denée (disambiguation)
- The Denes
