= Richard Waite =

Richard Waite may refer to:

- Richard A. Waite (1848–1911), British-born American architect
- Richard Waite (cricketer) (born 1980), English cricketer
