= Dodsley =

Dodsley is a surname. Notable people with the surname include:

- Christopher Dodsley (born 1978), English cricketer
- Edward Dodsley Barrow (1867–1956), Canadian politician
- James Dodsley (1724–1797), English bookseller, brother of Robert
- Robert Dodsley (1704–1764), English writer
