= Teddybears (TV series) =

British children's television programme

- Based on: Teddybears series by Susanna Gretz and Alison Sage
- Developed by: Adrian Hedley
- Directed by: Adrian Hedley
- Starring: Cheryl Blaize; Tigger Blaze; Louise Conran; Carl Matthewman; Tim Hulse
- Country of origin: United Kingdom
- Original language: English
- No. of series: 3
- No. of episodes: 39

Production
- Executive producers: Clarie Derry; David Hamilton; Dan Maddicott
- Producers: Adrian Hedley; Kate Marlow
- Editor: Mike Parkins
- Running time: 10 minutes
- Production companies: Meridian Broadcasting; United Productions; Link Entertainment

Original release
- Network: ITV (CITV)
- Release: January 5, 1998 – 2000

Teddybears is a British children's television programme broadcast on ITV from early 1998 to 2000, based on the books by Susanna Gretz. The show was about the life of five coloured teddy bears and their dog Fred. The show was filmed by Meridian Broadcasting. Journalists have compared Teddybears as being similar to and a rival of Teletubbies which was also produced around that time. However the series was targeted at older children.

== History ==
Teddybears is based on Susanna Gretz and Alison Sage's teddy bear books, the first of which was published almost 30 years before the TV programme's creation. Teddybear's inaugural season began on 5 January 1998.

A 1999 article in the Bristol Post said Teddybears "have become a huge hit with young viewers", having captured 64% of the target audience. Link Licensing, a United News & Media spinoff, began making toys, books, and other merchandising several months before the programme's debut. Rights and merchandising company ProVen Private Equity has from Link Licensing the rights to make Teddybears products. In 2000, Link Licensing sold the rights to Teddybears to the TV network Trio which bought 26 episodes.

== Comparison with Teletubbies ==
The producers of Teddybears asserted that Teddybears is not an immediate rival of Teletubbies; the Daily Record considers it a rival. The Daily Record noted that the two TV series have several parallels. Whereas the Teddybears eat "hot cross buns, honey, pancakes, jelly and ice cream", the Teletubbies eat "tubby toast and tubby custard". The Teddybears sing The Teddybear Song while the Teletubbies sing Teletubbies say "Eh-oh!". The Teddybears aired on CITV while The Teletubbies aired on BBC. A difference between the two TV series is that Teddybears's intended audience is older children.

The shows' similarities sparked "intense" coverage by the media. Newspapers and TV shows requested interviews with the teddybears, who all appeared on Richard and Judy's This Morning.

== Characters ==
The five teddybears in the series are William, Sarah, Louise, Robert, and Charles. They wear "brightly-coloured furry suits" and live at No. 8 Green Street, Bearbridge. According to actress Louise Conran, who played Sarah, she had to "wear a lycra body suit, padding on top of that and then the costumes which are about half an inch thick". Since the teddybear masks were fastened to their faces with glue, the teddybear actors had to keep the masks on the entire day, even when eating dinner. From the second series the costumes were changed because of this. The actors are adults but play child-sized bears on a set in which everything they interact with is oversized.

- Robert, the youngest of the bears, yellow. Often seen with his best friend, a toy frog called Phillip.
- Louise, green. The cheekiest of all the bears.
- Charles, black. The oldest of the bears, wise but very stubborn.
- William, red. Loves to cook.
- Sarah, orange. Plays the mother role. Stokenchurch actress Louise Conran played the role. She heard of the role while she was a maid on the BBC adaption of The Children of the New Forest from the TV film's assistant director who was a friend of Kate Marlow, Teddybear's producer.
- Fred, the Dalmatian

Puppeteers Cheryl Blaize, Louise Conran, Tim Hulse, James O' Donnell, Carl Matthewman, John Tobias, Sarah Jane Honeywell, Rae Grant, Grant Mason, Simon Snellings, Kathy Ryan, Rebecca Clow, and Lee Crowley all worked on the series.

== Episodes ==
Season 1

1. Teddybears Moving Day (5 January 1998)
2. Teddybears Go to the Moon (12 January 1998)
3. Teddybears Make Room (19 January 1998)
4. Teddybears and the Cold Cure (26 January 1998)
5. Episode 5
6. Stilts, Teddybears and Giants (9 February 1998)
7. Stormy Weather (16 February 1998)
8. Teddybears Toss Pancakes (23 February 1998)
9. Great Uncle Jerome's Travels (2 March 1998)
10. Olympic Cleaning (9 March 1998)
11. Tired Teddybears and Bossy Boots (16 March 1998)
12. Teddybears Picnic (23 March 1998)
13. Teddybears Do the Decorating (30 March 1998)

Season 2

1. Teddybears and the Tooth Fairy (6 January 1999)
2. Teddybears Play Pirates (13 January 1999)
3. Teddybears Home Movie (20 January 1999)
4. Teddybears Sports Day (27 January 1999)
5. Teddybears and the Lost Pet (3 February 1999)
6. Teddybears and the Ant Farm (10 February 1999)
7. Teddybears and the Mystery of the Missing Page (24 February 1999)
8. Teddybears and the Practical Joker (3 March 1999)
9. Teddybears' Circus (10 March 1999)
10. Teddybears' Hiccups (17 March 1999)
11. Teddybears and the Growly Old Bear (24 March 1999)
12. Teddybears and the Garden Fair (31 March 1999)
13. Teddybears' Seaside Holiday (7 April 1999)

Season 3

1. Teddybears and the Metal Detector (8 September 1999)
2. Teddybears and The Surprise Party (15 September 1999)
3. Teddybears Indoor Market (22 September 1999)
4. Teddybears and the Giant Tomato (29 September 1999)
5. Teddybears and a Jolly Good Joke (6 October 1999)
6. Teddybears and the Wrong Time of Day (13 October 1999)
7. Episode 6
8. Episode 7
9. Episode 8
10. Episode 9
11. Episode 10
12. Episode 11
13. Teddybears and the Magic Tree
14. Teddybears and the Popstar

== Video and DVD ==
- Teddybears: Circus and other stories (VHS released 1999, DVD released 2003)
- Teddybears: The Garden Fair and other stories (VHS released 1999, DVD released 2004)
- Teddybears: The Surprise Party and other stories (VHS released 1999, DVD released 2005)
- Teddybears: Giant Tomato and other stories (VHS released 2000, DVD released 2006)
