= Cottington =

Cottington may refer to:

- Francis Cottington, 1st Baron Cottington, Chancellor of the Exchequer under Charles I of England
- Gordon Cottington, a Scottish rugby player
