= David Sherrington =

David Sherrington may refer to:

- David Sherrington (cricketer), English cricketer
- David Sherrington (physicist), British theoretical physicist
- David Colin Sherrington, British polymer chemist
