= Peter Birtwisle =

English cricketer

Personal information
- Full name: Peter Cresswell Birtwisle
- Born: 2 August 1946 (age 80); Sunderland, County Durham, England
- Batting: Right-handed
- Bowling: Right-arm medium
- Relatives: Simon Birtwisle (son)

Domestic team information
- Years: Team
- 1977: Minor Counties East
- 1965–1984: Durham

Career statistics
Competition	List A
Matches	12
Runs scored	231
Batting average	23.10
100s/50s	–/1
Top score	59
Balls bowled	–
Wickets	–
Bowling average	–
5 wickets in innings	–
10 wickets in match	–
Best bowling	–
Catches/stumpings	4/–
- Source: Cricinfo, 7 August 2011

Peter Cresswell Birtwisle (born 2 August 1946) is a former English cricketer. Birtwisle was a right-handed batsman who bowled right-arm medium pace. He was born in Sunderland, County Durham.

Birtwisle made his debut for Durham against the Warwickshire Second XI in the 1965 Minor Counties Championship. He played Minor counties cricket for Durham from 1965 to 1984, making 91 Minor Counties Championship appearances and 2 MCCA Knockout Trophy appearances. He made his List A debut against Worcestershire in the 1968 Gillette Cup. He made 10 further List A appearances for Durham, the last of which came against Lancashire in the 1983 NatWest Trophy. In his 10 List A matches for Durham, he scored 223 runs at an average of 24.77, with a high score of 59. This score, his only fifty in List A cricket, came against Northamptonshire in the 1977 Gillette Cup. He also played a single List A match for Minor Counties East in the 1977 Benson & Hedges Cup against Yorkshire. In this match, he scored 8 runs before being dismissed by Graham Stevenson.

His son, Simon, played 2 List A matches for the Durham Cricket Board.
