= Allan Worthy =

English cricketer

Personal information
- Full name: Allan Worthy
- Born: 1 January 1974 (age 52); South Hetton, County Durham, England
- Batting: Right-handed
- Bowling: Right-arm medium

Domestic team information
- Years: Team
- 2004-2006: Northumberland
- 2000-2003: Durham Cricket Board

Career statistics
Competition	LA
Matches	5
Runs scored	193
Batting average	38.60
100s/50s	–/3
Top score	74
Balls bowled	–
Wickets	–
Bowling average	–
5 wickets in innings	–
10 wickets in match	–
Best bowling	–
Catches/stumpings	2/–
- Source: Cricinfo, 6 November 2010

Allan Worthy (born 1 January 1974) is an English cricketer. Worthy is a right-handed batsman who bowls medium pace. He was born at South Hetton, County Durham. He was the first ever to reach 10,000 North East Premier League runs.

Worthy made his debut in List A cricket for the Durham Cricket Board against the Leicestershire Cricket Board in the 2000 NatWest Trophy. From 2000 to 2003, he represented the Board in four List A matches, the last of which came against Glamorgan in the 2003 Cheltenham & Gloucester Trophy.

Worthy joined Northumberland in 2004, making his debut for the county in the Minor Counties Championship against Cambridgeshire. From 2004 to 2009, he has represented the county in 28 Championship matches, the last of which came against Buckinghamshire. Worthy currently represents the county in the MCCA Knockout Trophy. His debut Trophy match for the county came against Staffordshire in 2004. From 2004 to present, he has represented the county in 24 Trophy matches.

He also played a single List A match for the county against Middlesex in the 2005 Cheltenham & Gloucester Trophy. In his five career List A matches, he scored 193 runs at a batting average of 38.50, with three half centuries and a high score of 74. In the field he took two catches.

Worthy was the first player to reach 10,000 runs in North East Premier League history, he passed the landmark in 2015. John Graham and Simon Birtwisle have subsequently reached the tally.
