= Carlisle RLFC =

Defunct English professional rugby league club

Club information
- Full name: Carlisle Rugby League Club
- Nickname: Carlisle
- Colours: Blue; White; Red
- Founded: 1981; 45 years ago
- Exited: 1997; 29 years ago

Former details
- Ground: Brunton Park

Carlisle RLFC were a rugby league team based in Carlisle, Cumbria. The club was called Carlisle Border Raiders for the 1997 season, after which it merged with Barrow Braves.

== History ==
=== Early rugby league in Carlisle ===
Carlisle City, based at Harraby Greyhound Stadium close to Gillford Park, were admitted to the Northern Rugby Football Union for the 1928–29 season. They withdrew on 8 November 1928, after only ten games of which they won 1 and lost 9, scoring 59 and conceding 166. Their final game was a 36 – 13 defeat by Warrington at Wilderspool on 27 October 1928. Earlier in the season St Helens had visited Harraby Park on Sat 8 September and struggled to record a victory by 8 points to 5.

Rugby league as an organised sport died with it until the early 1950s when a Carlisle amateur side played two seasons in the Cumberland League.

=== Carlisle RLFC ===
Carlisle RLFC was set up and owned by local Association football team Carlisle United. The club colours were blue, red and white; the same as the football club. In April 1981, they were admitted to the Rugby Football League, playing at United's Brunton Park. They were coached by Allan Agar and Nigel Stephenson. The board of Carlisle United used the money from the sale of Peter Beardsley to finance the team. The club finished second in the Second Division and gained promotion in their first season. Their average attendance was 2,950 in that season. Agar departed as coach to join Featherstone as captain-coach in December 1982 having had his request for more funds turned down.

Mick Morgan replaced Agar and Carlisle made their debut in the First Division with a 7–10 home defeat against Wigan at Brunton Park. Dean Bell spent the 1982–83 season at Carlisle but couldn't stop the club from being relegated. Attendances plummeted in the First Division when they finished bottom. Thereafter the club was plagued by debts and poor attendances.

John Atkinson arrived from Leeds as player / coach in February 1983. The first season back in Division 2 was one of struggle - they finished third from bottom of the league. The next year they were on the fringes of the promotion race.

Allen Kellet took over as coach in February 1986 after the sudden resignation of John Atkinson. Carlisle opened the 1986 season with three defeats from four games; drawing the other against strugglers Runcorn. New coach, Roy Lester, got rid of players based in West Yorkshire and recruited a team of Cumbrian amateurs. They were then thrashed 112-0 by St Helens in a Lancashire Cup tie but recovered their season well, won more than they lost and finished in eighth place.

The club moved to Gillford Park, the former home of the defunct Carlisle City, for the 1988–89 season as they were not able to afford the rent on Brunton Park. In a few short weeks they had, with the help of their hard-working fans, built a ground that met the RFL's minimum criteria. The first match was a seventeen all draw with Batley on 3 September in front of 624 spectators.

Cameron Bell was coach from February 1990 to April 1994, he was succeeded by Hugh Waddell.

When a Rupert Murdoch funded Super League competition was proposed, part of the deal was that some traditional clubs would merge. Carlisle were to merge with Whitehaven, Workington Town and Barrow to form a Cumbria side to be based in Workington who would compete in Super League. This was, however, resisted.

A new name, Carlisle Border Raiders, was adopted for the 1997 season. Home crowds struggled to get into four figures and at the end of the season they merged with Barrow Braves to form Barrow Border Raiders. Their last league match on 20 July 1997, had produced a record score of 72–10 against another doomed side Prescot Panthers. Their final game was at home against Workington on 7 September 1997 which they lost 34–24 in front of a crowd of 453. The merged team played all its matches in Barrow and in 2002 dropped the 'Border' from its name.

== Playing record ==
Season	Division	Pld	W	D	L	F	A	Pts	Pos.
1981–82	1 - 2	32	28	0	4	649	296	56	2nd
1982–83	1 - 2	30	2	0	28	252	751	4	16th
1983–84	1 - 2	34	12	0	22	539	780	24	15th
1984–85	1 - 2	28	19	0	9	547	437	38	5th
1985–86	1 - 2	34	15	2	17	585	682	32	11th
1986–87	1 - 2	28	15	1	12	463	446	31	8th
1987–88	1 - 2	28	14	1	13	388	444	29	11th
1988–89	1 - 2	28	14	1	13	512	441	29	11th
1989–90	1 - 2	28	9	0	19	511	625	18	17th
1990–91	1 - 2	28	16	2	10	613	425	34	8th
1991–92	1 - 2 - 3	28	12	1	15	490	466	25	6th
1992–93	1 - 2 - 3	28	6	3	19	454	721	15	7th
1993–94	1 - 2	30	9	0	21	540	878	18	13th
1994–95	1 - 2	30	8	0	22	546	877	16	14th
1995–96	1 - 2	20	12	0	8	600	309	24	5th
1996	1 - 2 - 3	22	13	0	9	654	486	26	4th
1997	1 - 2 - 3	20	13	0	7	564	384	26	5th

== Past coaches ==
Also see Category:Carlisle RLFC coaches.

- Allan Agar & Nigel Stephenson 1981-2
- Mick Morgan 1982-3
- John Atkinson 1983-6
- Alan Kellett 1986
- Roy Lester 1986-88
- Tommy Dawes 1989
- Cameron Bell 1990-1994
- Hugh Waddell 1994-?
- Paul Charlton 1995-6

== Notable former players ==
These players have either; received a Testimonial match, were international representatives before, or after, their time at Carlisle, or are notable outside of rugby league.

- Robert Ackerman won caps for Wales while at Carlisle
- Allan Agar
- Stewart Rhodes
- Colin Armstrong
- John Atkinson
- Dean Bell
- Steve Brierley
- Sean Cusack won caps for Scotland while at Carlisle
- Steve Ferres
- Clayton Friend
- Steve Georgallis
- George Graham
- Richard Henare
- Simon Knox
- Michael "Mick" Morgan
- Matt Nable
- Hitro Okesene
- Kevin Pape (Testimonial match 1994)
- William "Willie" Richardson
- John Risman
- Graeme Robinson (from Featherstone Rovers)
- Danny Russell won caps for Scotland while at Carlisle
- Nigel Stephenson
- Stewart Rhodes
- Mal Thomason (Testimonial match 1990)
- James "Jimmy" Thompson
- Hugh Waddell
- Barry Williams won caps for Wales while at Carlisle

== Sources ==
- http://members.tripod.com/peterflower/table.htm
- Photos of Carlisle RLFC jerseys from OLDRUGBYSHIRTS.com
