= David Willson =

David Willson may refer to:

- David Willson (Quaker) (1778–1866), religious leader and mystic
- David Harris Willson (1901–1973), American historian and professor

== See also ==
- David Wilson (disambiguation)
