= Dean Bell =

NZ international rugby league footballer and coach

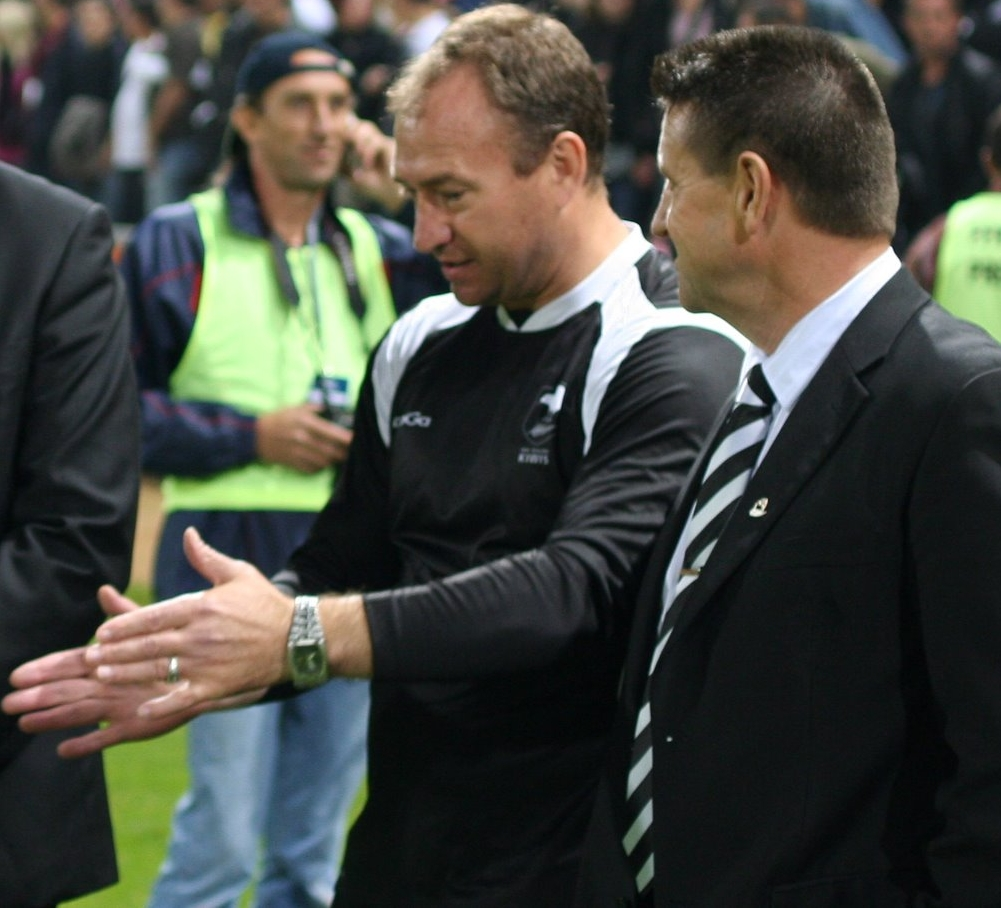

Personal information
- Full name: Dean Cameron Bell
- Born: 29 April 1962 (age 64) New Zealand

Playing information
- Height: 178 cm (5 ft 10 in)
- Weight: 90 kg (14 st 2 lb)
- Position: Wing, Centre, Loose forward
Club
Years	Team	Pld	T	G	FG	P
19??	Manukau
1982–83	Carlisle	23	11	0	0	33
1983–84	Leeds	22	5	0	0	20
1984–86	Easts (Sydney)	42	8	0	0	36
1986–94	Wigan	244+9	96	0	0	384
1995	Auckland Warriors	19	3	0	0	12
1996	Leeds Rhinos	1	1	0	0	4
	Total	360	124	0	0	489
Representative
Years	Team	Pld	T	G	FG	P
19??	Auckland
1982	Cumbria	1	0	0	0	0
1983–90	New Zealand Māori	8
1983–89	New Zealand	26	15	0	0	60
1987	South Island	1	0	0	0	0
1988	Rest of the World	1	0	0	0	0

Coaching information
Club
Years	Team	Gms	W	D	L	W%
1996–97	Leeds Rhinos	44	19	1	24	43
- Father: Cameron Bell
- Relatives: Ian Bell (uncle); Clayton Friend (cousin); Glenn Bell (cousin)

Dean Bell is a New Zealand former professional rugby league footballer and coach. A New Zealand international centre, he played his club football in England, Australia and New Zealand, but most notably with Wigan, with whom he won seven consecutive Challenge Cup Finals, a Lance Todd Trophy, and a Man of Steel Award. He later coached English club Leeds for two seasons.

Nicknamed "Mean Dean" and "Deano", he is a member of the Bell rugby league family that includes George, Ian, Cameron, Glenn, Cathy Bell and Clayton Friend.

== Playing career ==
Bell began his career in 1979 playing for the Manukau Magpies in the Auckland Rugby League competition. In 2011 he was named Manukau's Player of the Century.

Bell then moved to England in August 1982, playing for Carlisle and Leeds over the next two seasons. Dean Bell played at centre in Leeds' 18–10 victory over Widnes in the 1983–84 John Player Special Trophy Final during the 1983–84 season at Central Park, Wigan on Saturday 14 January 1984. At the end of the 1983/84 season he joined Eastern Suburbs in Australia, playing 42 games for them over the next three seasons. In 1987 Bell was a guest player for the South Island in a match against Auckland. In 1986 he joined Wigan, where he was to experience his greatest success. While at Wigan, Bell became a Seven-time Challenge Cup winner (including three as captain), a Six-time Championship winner, a One-time World Sevens winner, a Five-time John Player Trophy winner, a Two-time Premiership winner and a Four-time Lancashire Cup winner.

Dean Bell played at centre in Wigan's 15–8 victory over Oldham in the 1986 Lancashire Cup Final during the 1986–87 season at Knowsley Road, St. Helens, on Sunday 19 October 1986, was a substitute in the 28–16 victory over Warrington in the 1987 Lancashire Cup Final during the 1987–88 season at Knowsley Road, St. Helens, on Sunday 11 October 1987, played at centre and scored a try in the 22–17 victory over Salford in the 1988 Lancashire Cup Final during the 1988–89 season at Knowsley Road, St. Helens on Sunday 23 October 1988, and played loose forward in the 5–4 victory over St. Helens in the 1992 Lancashire Cup Final during the 1992–93 season at Knowsley Road, St. Helens on Sunday 18 October 1992.

Dean Bell played at centre and scored a try in Wigan's 18–4 victory over Warrington in the 1986–87 John Player Special Trophy Final during the 1986–87 season at Burnden Park, Bolton on Saturday 10 January 1987, played on the wing in the 12–6 victory over Widnes in the 1988–89 John Player Special Trophy Final during the 1988–89 season at Burnden Park, Bolton on Saturday 7 January 1989, played at centre in the 24–12 victory over Halifax in the 1989–90 Regal Trophy Final during the 1988–89 season at Headingley, Leeds on Saturday 13 January 1990, and played at centre in the 15–8 victory over Bradford Northern in the 1992–93 Regal Trophy Final during the 1992–93 season at Elland Road, Leeds on Saturday 23 January 1993.

During the 1992–93 Rugby Football League season Bell played at centre for defending RFL champions Wigan in the 1992 World Club Challenge against the visiting Brisbane Broncos.

Bell also won the Man of Steel Award in 1992 and the Lance Todd Trophy in 1993. Bell was later inducted into the Wigan Warriors Hall of Fame.

In 1994 Bell left Wigan, returning home to join coach John Monie at the new Auckland Warriors club. Bell became the club's first captain and led the team out in their inaugural match.

During his career he captained Wigan, the Auckland Warriors, and the New Zealand national team.

=== Representative career ===
While playing in the Auckland Rugby League competition Bell made the Auckland side. In 1982, he played for Cumbria against Australia during the 1982 Kangaroo tour. A year later, he toured England with the New Zealand Māori team before making his début for New Zealand that same year. In his début match he played alongside his uncle Ian Bell, and his cousin Clayton Friend. He went on to play 26 tests for New Zealand, retiring from international football early in 1989.

Bell picked up several honours while playing for New Zealand, including being the NZRL Player of the Year in 1987 and winning the NZ Māori Sports Personality of the Year in 1994. He was later made a member of the NZRL's Immortals and inducted as one of the NZRL's Legends of League in 2000. He is an Auckland Rugby League Immortal.

== Coaching and management career ==
Bell returned to Leeds in 1996 as coach but ended up playing in one match as player-coach. He remained the first grade coach in 1997 before accepting a two-year job as the head of the academy team.

During the 2000 World Cup he was the assistant Coach of the Aotearoa Māori side, working under his dad Cameron Bell.

In 2000 he returned to Wigan to head the youth development programme for seven years before being appointed the New Zealand Warriors Development Manager in August 2007.

Bell became the manager for the Warriors Under-20s side in the Toyota Cup, and at the end of the 2009 season Bell was promoted by the Warriors to be their new Recruitment and Development Manager.

In 2008 Bell was made the New Zealand national rugby league team football manager.

In 2012 Bell was made the New Zealand Vodafone Warriors General Manager Of Football

== Other achievements ==
Bell was also the feature of an episode of the show This Is Your Life.
