= Mark Burns (rugby league) =

Scotland international rugby league footballer

Personal information
- Full name: Mark Burns
- Born: 1974 (age 51–52) unknown

Playing information
- Position: Hooker
Club
Years	Team	Pld	T	G	FG	P
1992–14	Lindley Swifts
Representative
Years	Team	Pld	T	G	FG	P
1995	Scotland	4

Mark Burns (birth unknown) is a former professional rugby league footballer who played as a hooker in the 1990s, 2000s and 2010s.

He played at representative level for Scotland, and at club level for the Lindley Swifts (in Lindley, Huddersfield).

== Background ==
Mark Burns works as an independent financial adviser, and partner in Pennines IFA as of 2017.

== International honours ==
Mark Burns won 4-caps for Scotland while at the Lindley Swifts, against Ireland as a curtain raiser to the Leeds versus Wigan Rugby League Charity Shield match as precursor to the 1995–96 season at the Royal Dublin Society Showground, Dublin on Sunday 13 August 1995, and three appearances in the 1995 Rugby League Emerging Nations Tournament the 34–9 victory over Russia at Post Office Road, Featherstone on Monday 16 October 1995, the 38–16 victory over USA at Sixfields Stadium, Northampton on Wednesday 18 October 1995, and the 10–21 defeat by Cook Islands at Wheldon Road, Castleford on Friday 20 October 1995. In addition, while studying at university in Lancashire, England, he was captain of Scotland Students RL for the 1996 University Rugby League World Cup.
