= Cameron Bell (rugby league) =

New Zealand rugby league coach (1939–2026

Personal information
- Full name: Cameron Wilson Bell
- Born: 21 July 1939
- Died: 20 September 2026 (aged 87) Thames, New Zealand

Coaching information
Club
Years	Team	Gms	W	D	L	W%
	Manukau Magpies
1990–1994	Carlisle
2002–2003	Barrow Raiders	20	12	0	8	60
	Total	20	12	0	8	60
Representative
Years	Team	Gms	W	D	L	W%
1988–1989	Auckland	1	1	0	0	100
1995–2000	New Zealand Māori	10	5	0	5	50
1996	Counties Manukau	26	21	0	5	81
- Relatives: Dean Bell (son); Clayton Friend (cousin); Glenn Bell (nephew)

Cameron Wilson Bell (21 July 1939 – 20 September 2026) was a New Zealand rugby league coach. He was a member of the Bell rugby league family that includes George, Ian, Dean (his son) and Cathy and Clayton Friend.

== Coaching career ==
As coach of the Manukau Magpies, in 1985 he won the Hyland Memorial Cup as Auckland Rugby League's coach of the year. In 1988 Bell was appointed Auckland coach, a position he held for two seasons.

Between February 1990 and April 1994 Bell was the coach of Carlisle in England.

Bell returned to New Zealand in 1995, taking up the position of head coach of the New Zealand Māori side, a job he would hold until the 2000 World Cup.

He coached the Counties Manukau Heroes to a grand final victory in the 1996 Lion Red Cup.

Bell coached the Ngongotaha Chiefs in the 2001 Bartercard Cup.

== Death ==
Bell died at Thames on 20 September 2026, at the age of 87.
