= Barry Williams (rugby league) =

Wales international rugby league footballer

Personal information
- Full name: Barry Williams
- Born: 15 May 1971 (age 55) Great Broughton, Cumbria, England

Playing information
- Position: Hooker
Club
Years	Team	Pld	T	G	FG	P
1990–94	Carlisle	96	30	48	17	233
1994–95	Workington Town	6	0	0	0	0
1995–96	Carlisle	39	17	0	2	70
1997–99	Workington Town	45	12	2	0	52
	Total	186	59	50	19	355
Representative
Years	Team	Pld	T	G	FG	P
1992	Cumbria	1	0	0	0	0
1991–94	Wales	4	1	0	0	4

Barry Williams is an English-born former professional rugby league footballer who played in the 1990s. He played at representative level for Wales and Cumbria, and at club level for Carlisle (two spells), and Workington Town (two spells), as a hooker.

== Background ==
Barry Williams was born in Great Broughton, Cumberland, England.

== Club career ==
A talented ball-playing forward, Williams played a prominent role as Carlisle beat Castleford in the 1995–96 Regal Trophy match. A season earlier, he had helped Workington Town finish ninth in the old first division. In 1997 he turned down a move to Leeds Rhinos in order to have another spell at Workington Town.

== International honours ==
Barry Williams won caps for Wales while at 1991…1994 4-caps 1-try 4-points.
