= Danny Russell (rugby league, born 1969) =

Former Scotland international rugby league footballer

Personal information
- Full name: Daniel Russell
- Born: 24 December 1969 (age 56) Australia

Playing information
- Position: Hooker
Club
Years	Team	Pld	T	G	FG	P
1990–91	Manly Sea Eagles	8	0	0	0	0
1993–96	Carlisle	91	25	0	0	100
1997–00	Huddersfield Giants	98	22	0	0	88
	Total	197	47	0	0	188
Representative
Years	Team	Pld	T	G	FG	P
1996–00	Scotland	9	4	0	0	16

Danny Russell (born 24 December 1969) is a former rugby league footballer who played in the 1990s and 2000s. He played at representative level for Scotland, playing at the 2000 Rugby League World Cup, and at club level for Manly-Warringah Sea Eagles, Carlisle and Huddersfield, as a hooker.

== International honours ==
Russell won caps for Scotland while at Carlisle, and Huddersfield 1996...2000 9-caps.
