= Liam Bretherton =

Ireland international rugby league footballer

Personal information
- Full name: Liam John Bretherton
- Born: 20 June 1979 (age 47)

Playing information
- Position: Wing
Club
Years	Team	Pld	T	G	FG	P
1997	Warrington Wolves	2	0	0	0	0
1998	Whitehaven	13	3	3	0	18
1999	Wigan Warriors	5	2	0	0	8
2000–02	Leigh Centurions	52	23	19	1	131
2003	Chorley Lynx	8	2	0	0	8
2005–06	Blackpool Panthers	28	13	13	0	78
2007	Workington Town	5	0	0	0	0
2009	Rochdale Hornets	3	1	0	0	4
	Total	116	44	35	1	247
Representative
Years	Team	Pld	T	G	FG	P
1999–01	Ireland	5	0	0	0	0

Liam Bretherton (born 20 June 1979) is a former Ireland international rugby league footballer who played for the Wigan Warriors, Leigh Centurions, Warrington Wolves, Blackpool Panthers and Workington Town. He played on the wing.

He played at representative level for Ireland at the 2000 Rugby League World Cup.

Bretherton started his professional career at Warrington Wolves, making two appearances for the club during the 1997 season. After spending time on loan at Whitehaven in 1998, he signed for Wigan Warriors after a successful trial.

Bretherton was advised to retire from rugby league at the age of 23 after suffering a dislocated wrist. After spending time in coaching roles with Wigan and Leigh, he later decided to resume his playing career with Blackpool Panthers.

In 2011, he was appointed to the coaching staff at Huddersfield Giants as a strength and conditioning coach.
