= David Wilson (violinist) =

- Origin: Hollywood, California
- Genres: artisan lounge, easy listening jazz, Latin
- Years active: 1987–present
- Labels: ConSordino, Swallowtail Records

David Wilson (born September 22, 1945) is an American-born violinist and recording artist, known for his stylized arrangements of popular music, original compositions and his recordings with Henry Mancini.

Albums: "There's a Small Hotel" "The Romance of Paris" "Dreams of Hollywood Nights" "The Romance of Christmas" "Cafe Europa" "Easy To Love" "Romance After Hours" "Boulevard of Dreams" "Elegancia" "Nobody Does It Better" "The Crossing"

David Wilson currently resides in Los Angeles.
