= Gareth Smith =

English cricketer (born 1966)

Personal information
- Full name: Gareth Smith
- Born: 20 July 1966 (age 60); Jarrow, County Durham, England
- Batting: Right-handed
- Bowling: Left-arm fast-medium

Domestic team information
- Years: Team
- 1999–2001: Durham Cricket Board
- 1992: Bedfordshire
- 1990-1991: Warwickshire
- 1986–1989: Northamptonshire

Career statistics
Competition	FC	LA
Matches	10	12
Runs scored	90	25
Batting average	10.00	8.33
100s/50s	–/–	–/–
Top score	30	9*
Balls bowled	1,073	480
Wickets	21	14
Bowling average	30.14	25.42
5 wickets in innings	1	–
10 wickets in match	–	–
Best bowling	6/72	2/20
Catches/stumpings	3/–	1/–
- Source: Cricinfo, 6 November 2010

Gareth Smith (born 20 July 1966) is a former English cricketer. Smith was a right handed batsman who bowled left-arm fast-medium. He was born at Jarrow, County Durham.

Smith made his first-class debut for Northamptonshire against the touring Indians in 1986. His County Championship debut for the county came against Derbyshire in the same season. From 1986 to 1989, he represented the county in 9 first-class matches, the last of which came against Essex. His debut in List A cricket also came for Northamptonshire. His debut match in that format come against Somerset in 1987, with his second and final List A match for Northamptonshire coming against Sussex two years later.

In 1990, he joined Warwickshire. He played a single first-class match for the county, which was to be the last in his career, against Sussex. In his career total of 10 first-class matches, he scored 90 runs at a batting average of 10.00, with a high score of 30. In the field he took 3 catches and with the ball he took 21 wickets at a bowling average of 30.14, with a single five wicket haul which gave him best figures of 6/72. He also played 3 List A matches for Warwickshire during the 1990 season against Essex, Derbyshire and Sussex.

In 1992, he represented Bedfordshire. His debut in the Minor Counties Championship for the county came against Lincolnshire. During the 1992 season, he represented the county in 5 Championship matches, the last of which came against Staffordshire. Smith played a single MCCA Knockout Trophy match in 1992 for Bedfordshire against Suffolk.

His next appearance in List A cricket came for the Durham Cricket Board in the 1999 NatWest Trophy against Oxfordshire. From 1999 to 2001, he represented the Board in 7 one-day matches, the last of which came against Hertfordshire in the 2001 Cheltenham & Gloucester Trophy. In his career total of 12 List A matches, he scored 25 runs at an average of 8.33, with a high score of 9*. With the ball he took 14 wickets an average of 25.42, with best figures of 2/20.
