= David Wilson (artist) =

Irish illustrator (1872–1935)

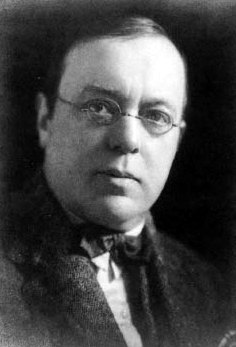
- Born: 4 July 1872; Minterburn Manse, County Tyrone, Ireland
- Died: 2 January 1935 (aged 61); 22 Downton Avenue, Streatham Hill, Surrey

David Wilson (4 July 1872 – 2 January 1935) was an Irish illustrator and painter.

== Life and family ==
Wilson was born on 4 July 1872 at Minterburn Manse, County Tyrone. His father was Reverend A.J. Wilson, and he had at least two older brothers. In 1883, the family moved to Belfast when his father moved to take up ministry of the Malone Presbyterian Church. Wilson attended the Royal Belfast Academical Institution, and later took drawing classes in the evening at the Government School of Design while he worked at the Northern Bank. He was a member of the Belfast Art Society. He married Edith Mary Mageean in 1899, and the couple moved to London, where Wilson enrolled at the Sphinx Studio. They had two children, a son James born in 1900, and a daughter, Edith born in 1908. His wife suffered from alcoholism, and died in 1913. Wilson remarried in 1915, to Frances Winifred James.

== Career ==
He met Alfred Stewart Moore, and he began contributing his cartoons to magazines including Moore's Nomad's Weekly. He submitted his first cartoon to the Daily Chronicle in 1895 and went on to become their cartoonist. In 1899, he started to contribute to the Belfast weekly publication, The Magpie. Between 1900 and 1933, Wilson contributed 55 cartoons to Punch. He was the chief cartoonist for The Graphic from 1910 to 1916. He was also published in the London Opinion, The Sketch, The Star, Temple Magazine, Life, Tatler, The Passing Show, The World and Pan. He illustrated the cover of the first issue of Votes for Women in October 1907, a publication of the Women's Social and Political Union.

Wilson was also a landscape and flower painter, and from 1920 his reputation for painting developed. In 1921, the Burlington Gallery, London exhibited his caricatures. He was a member of the Royal Institute of Painters in Water Colours from 1931, and the Royal Society of British Artists being elected a full member in 1926. He also exhibited with the Royal Academy in 1932. He was a member of the Savage Club and the Newspaper Press Fund. Wilson also taught at St John's Wood School of Art. Among the books he illustrated are Through a Peer Glass: Winnie's Adventures in Wastemonster (1908) by Arthur Waghorne, A Song of the Open Road and other verses (1916) by Louis J. McQuilland, and Wilhelm the Ruthless (1917) by A. A. Braun. During World War I he illustrated propaganda posters for the British government.

Wilson died on 2 January 1935, aged 61, Surrey. Examples of his work are held in the V&A and the Ulster Museum.
