= Gordon Cottington =

Scotland international rugby union & league footballer

Personal information
- Full name: Gordon Stanley Cottington
- Born: 2 April 1911 Kelso, Scottish Borders, Scotland
- Died: 7 June 1996 (aged 85) Leeds, England

Playing information

Rugby union
- Position: Hooker
Club
Years	Team	Pld	T	G	FG	P
≤1936–36	Kelso RFC
Representative
Years	Team	Pld	T	G	FG	P
1934–36	Scotland	5	0	0	0	0

Rugby league
- Position: Hooker
Club
Years	Team	Pld	T	G	FG	P
1936–46	Castleford	121	2	0	0	6

Gordon Stanley Cottington (2 April 1911 – 7 June 1996) was a Scottish rugby union and professional rugby league footballer who played in the 1930s and 1940s. He played representative level rugby union for Scotland, and at club level for Kelso RFC, as a hooker, and club level rugby league for Castleford, as a hooker.

== Background ==
Cottington was born in Kelso, Scottish Borders. He died aged 85 in Leeds, West Yorkshire, England.

== Playing career ==
=== Rugby union ===
Cottington won caps for Scotland (RU) in 1934 against Ireland, and England, in 1935 against Wales, and Ireland, and in 1936 against England.

=== Rugby league ===
Cottington switched codes in 1936 to join rugby league side Castleford. He played in Castleford's victory in the Yorkshire County League during the 1938–39 season.

== See also ==
- List of Scotland national rugby union players
- List of Scotland national rugby league team players
