= Matthew Tunstall =

Scotland international rugby league footballer

Personal information
- Full name: Matthew Tunstall

Playing information
- Position: Prop, Second-row
Club
Years	Team	Pld	T	G	FG	P
≤2003–08	Workington Town
2008–≥08	Whitehaven
	Total	0	0	0	0	0
Representative
Years	Team	Pld	T	G	FG	P
2003–04	Scotland	2+2

Matthew "Matt" Tunstall is a professional rugby league footballer who played as a prop or second-row forward in the 2000s. He played at representative level for Scotland, and at club level for Workington Town and Whitehaven.

== International honours ==
Matt Tunstall won 2 caps (plus 2 as substitute) for Scotland in 2003–2004 while at Workington Town.
