= Denée =

Denée may refer to:

== Places ==
- Denée, Belgium, part of the municipality of Anhée located in the province of Namur
- Denée, Maine-et-Loire, a commune in the Maine-et-Loire department in France

== People ==
- Denée Benton (b. 1991), American actress and singer

== See also ==
- Dene, an indigenous people in northern Canada
- Diné, an indigenous people in the southwestern US
