= David Fenwick Wilson =

Canadian organist (1929–2025)

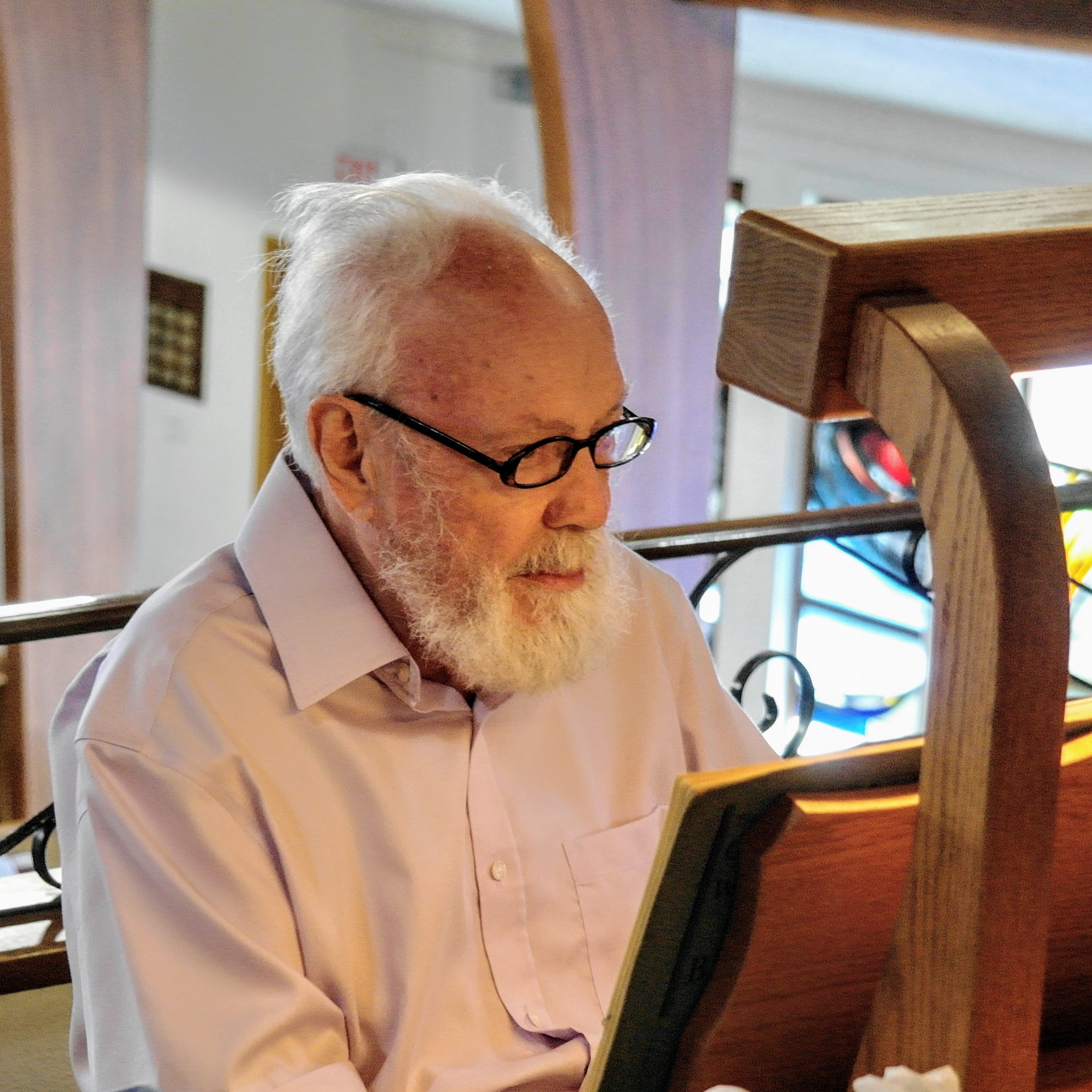
- Wilson in 2018
- Born: August 31, 1929; Pittsburgh, Pennsylvania, U.S.
- Died: July 2, 2025 (aged 95); Halifax, Nova Scotia, Canada
- Occupation: Organist
- Notable work: Music of the Middle Ages

David Fenwick Wilson (August 31, 1929 – July 2, 2025) was an American-born Canadian music scholar, educator and organist whose academic contributions include a treatise on music of the Middle Ages.

== Early life and education ==
Wilson was born in Pittsburgh, Pennsylvania on August 31, 1929. He received his Bachelor of Fine Arts from the Carnegie Mellon University, his Master of Music from Eastman School of Music of the University of Rochester in New York, and his Doctor of Philosophy from Case Western Reserve University in Cleveland, Ohio.

== Career ==
Wilson moved to Halifax, Nova Scotia, in 1957. In 1961, he became the first full-time professor of music at Dalhousie University. Wilson's work led to the formation of the Department of Music, and he served as the Founding Chairman from 1968 to 1971. During his academic tenure, Wilson directed the Dalhousie Chorale and also established an early music ensemble, which eventually grew into Musica Antiqua, an umbrella group of vocal and instrumental groups, involving students and interested members of the wider community, with a repertoire that included Baroque opera.

In 1978, Wilson co-founded the Early Music Society of Nova Scotia (EMSNS) with a view to providing focus, disseminating information, promoting concerts of early music and the playing of period instruments. By 1980, Wilson published the EMSNS newsletters, which within three years grew into "Consort", an illustrated magazine of some 20 pages, featuring both music news and musicological articles. Consort continued to appear at least three times a year until Wilson retired.

Wilson's other contributions to musical life include Music Director of the Halifax Baroque Ensemble, member of the Halifax Symphony Orchestra (1957–61), President of Musique Royale, President of the Royal Canadian College of Organists (RCCO Halifax Branch), Lecturer on French Organ Music at the Schola Cantorum in Paris (1999), and Organist/Choir Director at Saint James Anglican Church, Armdale (1992-2018).

== Death ==
Wilson died on July 2, 2025, at the age of 95.

== Publications ==
Wilson's 1990 book on medieval music represents an approach that focuses on the compositional process. Wilson's preface asserts "the belief that the historical study of music begins with the music itself". The combined publication comes in three parts: the text, Style and Structure, which includes 124 musical examples; An Anthology for Performance and Study, with 80 compositions; and two 90-minute cassettes of music recorded by the Hilliard Ensemble and specifically produced for the set. Wilson also contributed a chapter on "English notation of the 13th and 14th centuries" in a 2007 compendium.

== Honours and recognition ==
- In 1993, Wilson was awarded a Certificate of Merit from the Cultural Federations of Nova Scotia for his contribution to the Arts in Nova Scotia.
- In 2011, Wilson received the Mainland North Champion Award to recognize outstanding volunteers who consistently dedicate their time and talents to improving the lives of others. This recognition was recorded as Resolution No. 1839 in the Nova Scotia Legislature.
- In 2019, the Atlantic Medieval and Early Modern Group presented the Helios Vocal Ensemble in a concert about the life and times of Elizabeth Stuart, daughter of James I of England, entitled "The Winter Queen: Words and Music for a Renaissance Heroine ", followed by a recognition of Wilson's founding role in EMSNS on the occasion of Wilson's 90th birthday.
