= Jason Flowers =

Scotland international rugby league footballer

Personal information
- Full name: Jason Flowers
- Born: 30 January 1975 (age 51)

Playing information
- Position: Fullback, Wing, Centre, Second-row
Club
Years	Team	Pld	T	G	FG	P
1993–01	Castleford Tigers	191	47	0	1	189
2002–≥02	Halifax
≤2004–≥04	Salford City Reds
	Total	191	47	0	1	189
Representative
Years	Team	Pld	T	G	FG	P
1998–01	Scotland	3

Jason Flowers (born 30 January 1975), also known by the nickname of "Collie", is a professional rugby league footballer who played in the 1990s and 2000s, and has coached in the 2010s. He played at representative level for Scotland, and at club level for Redhill ARLFC (in Airedale, Castleford), the Castleford (Tigers), Halifax and the Salford City Reds, primarily as a fullback, but also at wing, centre or second-row, and coached at club level for the National Conference League (NCL) Eagles (assistant coach to Jamie Benn), and Lock Lane ARLFC with Francis Maloney.

== Playing career ==
=== International honours ===
Jason Flowers won 2 caps (plus 1 as substitute) for Scotland in 1998–2001 while at Castleford.

== Club career ==
Jason Flowers was transferred from Redhill ARLFC to Castleford on Wednesday 12 May 1993.
