= Robert Surtees =

Robert Surtees may refer to:

- Robert Surtees (cinematographer) (1906–1985), American cinematographer
- Robert Surtees (antiquarian) (1779–1834), historian and antiquarian
- R. S. Surtees (Robert Smith Surtees, 1805–1864), English writer
