= Andy McPhail =

Scotland international rugby league footballer

Personal information
- Full name: Andrew McPhail
- Born: 12 November 1980 (age 45) Rutherglen, Scotland

Playing information
- Position: Wing, Centre
Club
Years	Team	Pld	T	G	FG	P
≤2004–≥04	Glasgow Bulls
≤2005–≥05	Clyde Buccaneers
	Total	0	0	0	0	0
Representative
Years	Team	Pld	T	G	FG	P
2004–05	Scotland	4	1	0	0	4
- Source: As of 16 May 2012

Andrew McPhail (born 12 November 1980) is a Scottish professional rugby league footballer who played in the 2000s. He played as a winger or centre at representative level for Scotland, and at club level for the Glasgow Bulls and the Clyde Buccaneers.

== International honours ==
Andy McPhail won 4 (1-cap sub) caps for Scotland in 2004–2005 while at Glasgow Bulls, and Clyde Buccaneers.

Andy scored a try with his first touch in his début International vs Wales RL which Scotland won 30–22 in 2004 at Old Anniesland, home of Glasgow Hawks RFC.

Andy holds the record of points scored in a single match for Scotland Students RL with a total of 38 points (4 tries and 11 conversions) in the 68–0 win vs Serbia RL played in Rotterdam, Holland in 2003.
