= David Wilson (murderer) =

David Wilson (born 1970, died 20 July 1998) was a convicted murderer and the second person to be executed by Saint Kitts and Nevis since it became a sovereign state in 1983.

In February 1996, Wilson and Clement Thomas were convicted of beating a security guard to death in 1994. Wilson was sentenced to death by the trial judge, and his appeal was rejected by the appeal court. After the appeal court's judgment, Governor-General Sir Cuthbert Sebastian signed Wilson's death warrant, and he was executed by hanging on 20 July 1998. It was the first execution in Saint Kitts and Nevis since 1985. He was 28 years old when he was executed.

Wilson's execution was controversial because it was carried out before he was able to appeal his case to the Judicial Committee of the Privy Council in London, which is the supreme court for Saint Kitts and Nevis.
