= Lindley Swifts =

English rugby league club, based in Lindley, West Yorkshire

Lindley Swifts ARLFC
Club information
- Full name: Lindley Swifts ARLFC
- Founded: 1884; 142 years ago
- Exited: 1939; 87 years ago
- Readmitted: 1992; 34 years ago
- Website: http://www.pitchero.com/clubs/lindleyswifts/

details
- Ground: Birchencliffe Sports and Social Club, Birchencliffe, Huddersfield
- Competition: Pennine League

Lindley Swifts are an amateur Rugby league club based in Lindley, West Yorkshire. Their home ground is Birchencliffe Cricket Club, in Birchencliffe, Huddersfield. The open age team currently play in Premier Division in the Pennine League.

== History ==
The club had been most successful during its period in the amateur leagues, in the years between 1884, up to the 1938-39 season; the season in which they disbanded. Lindley Swifts played in the Leeds & Districts League against clubs like Sharlston Rovers. They played in this league because the team was open age and the Huddersfield & Districts League at that time was an under 21 age group. The club played in black and white hoops, the same colours that they play in today. Lindley lost 32-2 to St. Helens in the first round of the Challenge Cup in 1928–29. In the 1930–31 Challenge Cup, they played Rochdale Hornets and lost 13-2 in the first round. In 1939 the pitch was turned into an allotment to grow vegetables for World War II. It is believed that the Huddersfield Royal Infirmary stands where the ground used to be.

In January 2001, Lindley Swifts won the 2000-01 Yorkshire Cup, beating Hunslet Warriors 16-11, at Featherstone Rovers', Post Office Road.

== Honours ==
- BARLA Yorkshire Cup
  - Winners (1): 2000–01
