= Glenn Bell =

Scotland international rugby league footballer

Personal information
- Born: 26 March 1964 (age 61); New Zealand

Playing information
- Position: Prop, Second-row
Club
Years	Team	Pld	T	G	FG	P
1988–90	Featherstone Rovers	34	3	0	0	12
1991–97	Dewsbury Rams	134	23
1998–99	Doncaster	7	1	0	0	4
	Total	175	27	0	0	16
Representative
Years	Team	Pld	T	G	FG	P
1997	Scotland	1	0	0	0	0
- Relatives: Dean Bell (cousin); Cameron Bell (uncle)

Glenn Bell is a former Scotland international rugby league footballer who played in the 1980s and 1990s. He played at club level for Featherstone Rovers, Dewsbury Rams and Doncaster, as a prop, or second-row. Played for Manukau Magpies in Auckland and Represented for Auckland v Canterbury Bankstown, Maori v Western Samoa 1988 and versus Australia in 1985 and 1989 Presidents XIII-Wellington. Played against Kiwis v Featherstone 1989.Retired 2000.

== Background ==
Bell was born in New Zealand. He is of Maori and Scottish descent.

== Playing career ==
Bell played for the Manukau Magpies, and is a member of the wider Bell family. He Played in England for a large majority of his career but he made a name for himself playing for various Auckland semi professional club sides. Glenn was a very respected player known for his defensive efforts.

=== Representative career ===
He won a cap for Scotland while at Dewsbury Rams in 1997 against France.

=== County Cup Final appearances ===
Glenn Bell played at prop (replaced by substitute Alan Dakin) in Featherstone Rovers' 14-20 defeat by Bradford Northern in the 1989–90 Yorkshire Cup Final during the 1989–90 season at Headingley, Leeds on Sunday 5 November 1989.
