= Sean Cusack (rugby league) =

Scotland international rugby league footballer

Personal information
- Full name: Sean Mitchell Cusack
- Born: 27 January 1966 (age 59)

Playing information
- Position: Centre, Second-row, Loose forward
Club
Years	Team	Pld	T	G	FG	P
1996–??	Carlisle	35
Representative
Years	Team	Pld	T	G	FG	P
1995–96	Scotland	4	1	0	0	4

Sean Cusack (born 27 January 1966) is a former professional rugby league footballer who played in the 1990s. He played at representative level for Scotland, and at club level for Carlisle.

== Career ==
=== Club career ===
Cusack joined Carlisle from Broughton Red Rose in May 1996, he played 35 games for Carlisle Border Raiders.

=== International honours ===
Cusack won four caps for Scotland between 1995 and 1997
