= Jamie Benn (rugby league) =

Scotland international rugby league footballer and coach

Personal information
- Full name: Jamie Benn
- Born: 4 May 1977 (age 47)

Playing information
- Position: Fullback, Wing
Club
Years	Team	Pld	T	G	FG	P
1998–00	Castleford Tigers	13	1	26	0	56
1998(loan)	→ York Wasps	3	3	8	0	28
1998(loan)	→ Keighley Cougars	6	1	22	1	49
1999(loan)	→ York Wasps	27	10	105	4	254
2001–02	York Wasps	14	1	27	0	58
2002–04	Dewsbury Rams	37	6	123	7	277
2006–07	Featherstone Rovers	16	1	7	1	19
	Total	116	23	318	13	741
Representative
Years	Team	Pld	T	G	FG	P
2006–10	Scotland	7	5	0	0	20

Jamie Benn (born 4 May 1977) is a Scottish former professional rugby league footballer, who played at representative level for Scotland, and at club level for the Castleford Tigers, York Wasps, Keighley Cougars, Dewsbury Rams, Featherstone Rovers and the Castleford Panthers, as an occasional goal-kicking fullback or wing.

In 1999, Benn set the club records at York Wasps for most points scored (30) and most goals (13) in a match.

After retiring as a player, Benn coached a number of teams at amateur level, including Oulton Raiders and Hunslet Warriors. He also coached the National Conference League (NCL) Eagles, with Jason Flowers as his assistant.
