= David Wilson (sex offender) =

English sex offender

David Nicholas Wilson
- Born: 1984 (age 41–42)
- Occupation: Labourer
- Status: Convicted
- Criminal charges: 96 sexual offences against 51 boys
- Penalty: 28 years in prison + 8 years on extended licence

David Nicholas Wilson (born 1984) is a prolific British sex offender.

Wilson, a labourer living in Kirstead, King's Lynn, Norfolk, England, preyed on his victims online. He obtained many indecent images and videos of boys by pretending to be a teenage girl in order to trick them into sending the images and videos of themselves and other children. He blackmailed his victims into sending more extreme images and videos of themselves and in some cases of them sexually abusing other children. Wilson was arrested three times by the National Crime Agency before adequate evidence was gathered to prosecute him.

On 23 November 2020 at Ipswich Crown Court, he admitted 96 sexual offences against 51 boys aged between four and 14, which he committed between May 2016 and April 2020. On 10 February 2021, Judge Rupert Overbury sentenced Wilson to 25 years in prison and an extended licence period of eight years.

Following the sentencing, the Solicitor General's Office referred the sentence to the Court of Appeal under the Unduly Lenient Sentence Scheme. On 27 May 2021, Wilson's sentence was increased to 28 years, with 8 years on extended licence.
