= Jason Syme =

Scotland international rugby league & union footballer

Personal information
- Full name: Jason Syme
- Born: 27 June 1972 (age 53) Dollar, Clackmannanshire, Scotland

Playing information

Rugby union
- Position: Lock, Number Eight
Club
Years	Team	Pld	T	G	FG	P
1998–01	Kirkcaldy RFC

Rugby league
Representative
Years	Team	Pld	T	G	FG	P
1996	Scotland	1	0	0	0	0

Jason Syme (born 27 June 1972) is a Scottish former professional rugby league and rugby union footballer who played in the 1990s and 2000s. He played representative level rugby league (RL) for Scotland, at club level for Central Centurions, and club level rugby union (RU) for Dunfermline RFC (two spells), Heriot's Rugby Club and Kirkcaldy RFC, as a lock, or number eight. Syme was a pupil at Dollar Academy during the 1980s, and was later a student in Dundee.

== International honours ==
Jason Syme represented Scotland (RL); he played as an interchange/substitute in the 26-6 victory over Ireland at Firhill Stadium, Glasgow on Tuesday 6 August 1996.
