= James Garfield (footballer) =

English footballer (1874–1949)

Personal information
- Full name: James Herbert Garfield
- Date of birth: 19 April 1874
- Place of birth: Wellingborough, England
- Date of death: 1949 (aged 74–75)
- Position: Winger

Senior career*
Years	Team	Apps	(Gls)
1898–1899	Gravesend United		
1899–1900	Aston Villa	1	(1)
1900–1905	Northampton Town		
1905	Kettering		
Total		1	(1)
- * Club domestic league appearances and goals

James Herbert Garfield (19 April 1874–1949) was an English footballer who played in the Football League for Aston Villa. His only appearance for Villa came on 13 November 1899 where he scored in a 2–0 victory against Stoke.
