= Chris Mann (footballer) =

English footballer

Personal information
- Full name: Christopher James Mann
- Date of birth: 19 March 1872
- Place of birth: Guisborough, England
- Date of death: 1949 (aged 76–77)
- Position: Centre half

Senior career*
| Years | Team | Apps | (Gls) |
| 1891–1893 | Mount Pleasant (Guisborough) | | |
| 1893–1896 | Guisborough | | |
| 1896–1899 | Middlesbrough | | |
| 1899–1901 | Aston Villa | 10 | (0) |
| 1901–1905 | Burton United | 116 | (8) |
| 1905–1906 | Gresley Rovers | | |
| 1906 | Allsopp's Brewery | | |
| 1906 | Trent Rovers | | |
| Total | | 126 | (8) |
- * Club domestic league appearances and goals

Christopher James Mann (19 March 1872–1949) was an English footballer who played in the Football League for Aston Villa and Burton United.
