= Christopher Dodsley =

English cricketer

Personal information
- Full name: Christopher William Dodsley
- Born: 4 April 1978 (age 48); Gateshead, Tyne and Wear, England
- Batting: Right-handed
- Bowling: Right-arm bowling medium fast

Domestic team information
- Years: Team
- 2001: Durham Cricket Board

Career statistics
Competition	LA
Matches	1
Runs scored	1
Batting average	–
100s/50s	–/–
Top score	1*
Balls bowled	18
Wickets	–
Bowling average	–
5 wickets in innings	–
10 wickets in match	–
Best bowling	–
Catches/stumpings	–/–
- Source: Cricinfo, 6 November 2010

Christopher William Dodsley (born 4 April 1978) is a former English cricketer. Dodsley was a right-handed batsman who bowled right-arm medium pace. He was born in Gateshead, Tyne and Wear.

Dodsley represented the Durham Cricket Board in a single List A match against Buckinghamshire in the 2nd round of the 2002 Cheltenham & Gloucester Trophy which was played in 2001. In his only List A match, he scored an unbeaten 1 run.
