= Ian Knott =

English rugby league footballer

Personal information
- Full name: Ian Graham Knott
- Born: 2 October 1976 (age 49)

Playing information
- Position: Fullback, Centre, Stand-off, Second-row, Loose forward
Club
Years	Team	Pld	T	G	FG	P
1993–2001	Warrington Wolves	135	34	19	0	174
2002–03	Wakefield Trinity	39	7	79	0	186
2004–05	Leigh Centurions	37	24	3	0	104
	Total	211	65	101	0	464

Ian Graham Knott (born 2 October 1976) is an English former rugby league footballer who played for Wigan St Judes ARLFC, Warrington Wolves, Wakefield Trinity, and Leigh Centurions (captain), as a fullback, centre, stand-off, second-row, or loose forward.

Knott's career was ended in 2005 by a severe back injury sustained during a match, which left him unable to walk before he underwent five surgeries and had a morphine pump implanted. He subsequently required the use of a walking stick and suffered from psychosis and depression, later revealing to The Guardian in 2019 that he still occasionally required the morphine pump and that he had attempted suicide following the injury. He now works as a public speaker for State of Mind, a charity that aims to tackle the stigma around the mental health of male athletes and their reluctance to discuss their struggles.
