= Richard Waite (cricketer) =

English cricketer

Personal information
- Full name: Richard Parkinson Waite
- Born: 11 June 1980 (age 46); Stockton-on-Tees, County Durham, England
- Batting: Right-handed
- Bowling: Right-arm off break
- Relatives: married to Sarah and has 2 children

Domestic team information
- Years: Team
- 2010: Northumberland
- 2004–2006 & 2009: Cumberland
- 2002–2003: Durham Cricket Board

Career statistics
Competition	LA
Matches	10
Runs scored	350
Batting average	45.23
100s/50s	–/–
Top score	89*
Balls bowled	69
Wickets	4
Bowling average	18.50
5 wickets in innings	–
10 wickets in match	–
Best bowling	2/25
Catches/stumpings	–/–
- Source: Cricinfo, 6 November 2010

Richard Parkinson Waite (born 11 June 1980) is an English cricketer. Waite is a right-handed batsman who bowls right-arm off break. He was born in Stockton-on-Tees, County Durham.

Waite represented the Durham Cricket Board in 10 List A matches against Buckinghamshire in the 2nd round of the 2002 Cheltenham & Gloucester Trophy which was played in 2001 and against Glamorgan in the 2003 Cheltenham & Gloucester Trophy. In his 10 List A matches, he scored 350 runs at a batting averageof 45.23 with high score of 89*. In the field he took a single catch. With the ball he took 4 wickets at a bowling average of 18.50, with best figures of 2/25.

In 2004, he joined Cumberland, making his Minor Counties Championship debut for the county against Cambridgeshire. From 2004 to 2006, he represented the county in 12 Championship matches, the last of which came against Bedfordshire. Waite also played a number of MCCA Knockout Trophy matches for the county.

For the 2010 season, Waite represented Northumberland, playing 2 Minor Counties Championship matches against Bedfordshire and Suffolk. His debut in the MCCA Knockout Trophy came against Staffordshire. He played 3 further Trophy matches for the county in 2010. He was formally part of the coaching team for Hong Kong Ladies Cricket Team.
