= Gareth Davies (rugby league) =

Wales international rugby league footballer

Personal information
- Full name: Gareth Davies
- Born: 7 August 1973 (age 52) Cardiff, Wales

Playing information
- Position: Fullback, Centre, Second-row, Loose forward
Club
Years	Team	Pld	T	G	FG	P
1995–97	Warrington	9+7	3	0	0	12
Representative
Years	Team	Pld	T	G	FG	P
1996	Wales	4	5	0	0	20

Gareth Davies (born 7 August 1973) is a Welsh physical education teacher, former professional rugby league footballer who played in the 1990s, and rugby union coach. He played representative level rugby league (RL) for Wales, and at club level for Warrington, as a fullback, centre, second-row or loose forward, and coaches college level rugby union (RU) for St Edward's College, Liverpool.

== Background ==
Davies was born in Widnes.

== Playing career ==
=== International honours ===
Gareth Davies won four caps for Wales, in June 1995 against the USA (2 matches), and while at Warrington in the 1996 European Rugby League Championship against France, and England.

=== Club career ===
Gareth Davies made his début for Warrington on Wednesday 20 September 1995, he played in 1996's Super League I, 1997's Super League II, and he played his last match for Warrington Sunday 6 April 1997.
