= Simon Birtwisle =

English cricketer

Personal information
- Full name: Simon Jonathan Birtwisle
- Born: 24 July 1979 (age 47); Sunderland, County Durham, England
- Batting: Right-handed
- Bowling: Slow left-arm orthodox
- Relatives: Peter Birtwisle (father)

Domestic team information
- Years: Team
- 2006–2007: Northumberland
- 2002–2003: Durham Cricket Board
- 2000–2001: Northumberland

Career statistics
Competition	LA
Matches	2
Runs scored	35
Batting average	17.50
100s/50s	–/–
Top score	32
Balls bowled	–
Wickets	–
Bowling average	–
5 wickets in innings	–
10 wickets in match	–
Best bowling	–
Catches/stumpings	1/–
- Source: Cricinfo, 6 November 2010

Simon Jonathan Birtwisle (born 24 July 1979) is an English cricketer. Birtwisle is a right-handed batsman who bowls slow left-arm orthodox. He was born in Sunderland, County Durham.

Birtwisle made his debut in County Cricket for Northumberland in 2000, making his debut in the Minor Counties Championship against Bedfordshire. From 2000 to 2001, he represented the county in 5 Championship matches, the last of which came against Suffolk. During his first stint at the county, he also played 3 MCCA Knockout Trophy matches.

Birtwisle later represented the Durham Cricket Board in 2 List A matches against Herefordshire in the 2nd round of the 2003 Cheltenham & Gloucester Trophy which was played in 2002 and Glamorgan in 3rd round of the same competition which was played in 2003. In his 2 List A matches, he scored 35 runs at a batting average of 17.50, with a high score of 32. In the field he took a single catch.

In 2006, he rejoined Northumberland for a second stint with the county. His first return match came against Shropshire in the MCCA Knockout Trophy. From 2006 to 2007, he represented the county in 6 Trophy matches, the last of which came against Norfolk.

He currently plays club cricket for Chester-le-Street Cricket Club in the North East Premier League.

== Family ==
His father, Peter, played List A and Minor counties cricket for Durham, as well as List A cricket for Minor Counties East.
