= Adrian Hedley =

English cricketer

Personal information
- Full name: Adrian John Hedley
- Born: 8 December 1978 (age 47); Durham, County Durham, England
- Batting: Right-handed
- Bowling: Right-arm medium

Domestic team information
- Years: Team
- 1999: Durham Cricket Board

Career statistics
Competition	LA
Matches	3
Runs scored	54
Batting average	18.00
100s/50s	–/–
Top score	46
Balls bowled	–
Wickets	–
Bowling average	–
5 wickets in innings	–
10 wickets in match	–
Best bowling	–
Catches/stumpings	1/–
- Source: Cricinfo, 7 November 2010

Adrian John Hedley (born 8 December 1978) is a former English cricketer. Hedley was a right-handed batsman who bowled right-arm medium pace. He was born at Durham, County Durham.

Hedley represented the Durham Cricket Board in 3 List A matches in the 1999 NatWest Trophy, against Oxfordshire, Staffordshire and Gloucestershire. In his 3 List A matches, he scored 54 runs at a batting average of 18.00, with a high score of 46. In the field he also took a single catch.
