= David Wilson (cricketer, born 1966) =

English cricketer

Personal information
- Full name: David Wilson
- Born: 14 November 1966 (age 59); Durham, County Durham, England
- Batting: Right-handed
- Role: Wicketkeeper

Domestic team information
- Years: Team
- 2002–2003: Durham Cricket Board

Career statistics
Competition	LA
Matches	2
Runs scored	19
Batting average	–
100s/50s	–/–
Top score	19*
Balls bowled	–
Wickets	–
Bowling average	–
5 wickets in innings	–
10 wickets in match	–
Best bowling	–
Catches/stumpings	2/2
- Source: Cricinfo, 6 November 2010

David Wilson (born 14 November 1966) is an English cricketer. Wilson is a right-handed batsman who plays primarily as a wicketkeeper. He was born in Durham, County Durham.

Wilson represented the Durham Cricket Board in 2 List A matches against Herefordshire in the 2nd round of the 2003 Cheltenham & Gloucester Trophy which was played in 2002 and Glamorgan in 3rd round of the same competition which was played in 2003. In his 2 List A matches, he scored 19 runs, with an unbeaten high score of 19. In the field he took 2 catches and made 2 stumpings.

He currently plays club cricket for Chester-le-Street Cricket Club in the North East Premier League.
