= Nick Surtees =

New Zealand rugby league footballer

Personal information
- Full name: Nicholas Surtees
- Born: 20 January 1977 (age 48); Auckland, New Zealand

Playing information
Club
Years	Team	Pld	T	G	FG	P
≤2005–≥05	St Albans Centurions
Representative
Years	Team	Pld	T	G	FG	P
2005	Scotland	2

Nicholas Surtees (20 January 1977) is a former professional rugby league footballer who played in the 2000s. He played at representative level for Scotland, and at club level for the St Albans Centurions.

== Background ==
Surtees was born in Auckland, New Zealand.

== International honours ==
Surtees won caps for Scotland while at St Albans Centurions in 2005 against Wales (sub), and Ireland (sub).
