= David Sherrington (cricketer) =

English cricketer

Personal information
- Full name: David Sherrington
- Born: 1 September 1961 (age 65); Easington, County Durham, England
- Batting: Right-handed
- Role: Wicketkeeper

Domestic team information
- Years: Team
- 1999: Durham Cricket Board

Career statistics
Competition	LA
Matches	3
Runs scored	2
Batting average	–
100s/50s	–/–
Top score	2*
Balls bowled	–
Wickets	–
Bowling average	–
5 wickets in innings	–
10 wickets in match	–
Best bowling	–
Catches/stumpings	4/1
- Source: Cricinfo, 6 November 2010

David Sherrington (born 1 September 1961) is a former English cricketer. Sherrington was a right-handed batsman who played primarily as a wicketkeeper. He was born in Easington, County Durham.

Sherrington represented the Durham Cricket Board in three List A matches during the 1999 NatWest Trophy against Oxfordshire, Staffordshire and Gloucestershire. In his three List A matches, he batted once, scoring an unbeaten 2 runs. Behind the stumps, he took 4 catches and made a single stumping.
