= Mark Hilton (rugby league) =

England international rugby league footballer

Personal information
- Born: 31 March 1975 (age 50)

Playing information
- Position: Prop
Club
| Years | Team | Pld | T | G | FG | P |
|---|---|---|---|---|---|---|
| 1993–06 | Warrington Wolves | 192+68 | 9 | 0 | 0 | 36 |
Representative
| Years | Team | Pld | T | G | FG | P |
| 1994–95 | Great Britain U-21 | 2 | 0 | 0 | 0 | 0 |
| 1995–99 | England | 2 | 0 | 0 | 0 | 0 |
| 2002–03 | Lancashire | 3 | 0 | 0 | 0 | 0 |

Mark Hilton (born 31 March 1975), also known by the nickname of "The Beast", is an English former professional rugby league footballer who played in the 1990s and 2000s. He played at representative level for England, and at club level for Warrington, as a prop.

== International honours ==
Mark Hilton won caps for England while at Warrington in 1995 against France (interchange/substitute), and in 1999 against France (interchange/substitute).

== Club career ==
Mark Hilton made his début for Warrington on Saturday 18 December 1993, and he played his last match for Warrington on Saturday 15 July 2006.

== Outside of rugby league ==
Hilton retired from rugby league in 2006 to begin a teaching career. As of 2016, he teaches mathematics at Beamont Collegiate Academy, Warrington, having previously taught at Maghull High School, Merseyside.
