= Dene Miller =

Scotland international rugby league footballer

Personal information
- Full name: Dene Miller
- Born: 14 December 1981 (age 43); Welwyn Garden City, England

Playing information
Club
Years	Team	Pld	T	G	FG	P
≤2006–≥07	St Albans Centurions
≤2008–≥08	London Skolars
	Total	0	0	0	0	0
Representative
Years	Team	Pld	T	G	FG	P
2006	Scotland	+1

Dene Miller (born 14 December 1981) is a former Scotland international rugby league footballer who played in the 2000s. He played at club level for the St Albans Centurions and the London Skolars.

== Background ==
Dene Miller was born in Welwyn Garden City, Hertfordshire, England, he has Scottish ancestors, and eligible to play for Scotland due to the grandparent rule.

== Playing career ==
=== International honours ===
Dene Miller won a cap for Scotland whilst at St Albans Centurions in 2006 against Wales (sub).

=== Club career ===
Dene Miller signed for London Skolars making his début in the Northern Rail cup against holders Leigh Centurions, he became the first player at the London Skolars to win the Northern Rail "player of the round" award after scoring a hat-trick of tries against Sheffield Eagles in the group stages.
