= Christopher Mann (cricketer) =

English cricketer

Personal information
- Full name: Christopher Mann
- Born: 14 April 1981 (age 45); South Shields, Tyne and Wear, England
- Nickname: Norman, Woody
- Height: 6 ft 1 in (1.85 m)
- Batting: Right-handed
- Bowling: Right-arm medium
- Role: Opening Batsman

Domestic team information
- Years: Team
- 2001: Durham County Cricket Club (squad no. 18)

Career statistics
Competition	LA
Matches	1
Runs scored	7
Batting average	7.00
100s/50s	–/–
Top score	7
Balls bowled	–
Wickets	–
Bowling average	–
5 wickets in innings	–
10 wickets in match	–
Best bowling	–
Catches/stumpings	1/–
- Source: Cricinfo, 6 November 2010

Christopher Mann (born 14 April 1981) is an English cricketer. Mann is a right-handed batsman who bowls right-arm medium pace. He was born in South Shields, Tyne and Wear.

Mann represented the Durham Cricket Board in a single List A match against Buckinghamshire in the 2nd round of the 2002 Cheltenham & Gloucester Trophy which was played in 2001. In his only List A match, he scored 7 runs and took a single catch in the field.
