= Richard Henare =

New Zealand rugby league footballer

Personal information
- Born: 12 October 1968 (age 57) New Zealand

Playing information
- Position: Wing
Club
Years	Team	Pld	T	G	FG	P
	Carlisle
1996–97	Warrington Wolves	34	29	0	0	116
199?–00	Swinton Lions
	Total	34	29	0	0	116
- Source: wolvesplayers

Richard Henare (born 12 October 1968) is a New Zealand former rugby league footballer who played in the 1990s and 2000s. He played at club level for Carlisle, in the Super League for the Warrington Wolves, and the Swinton Lions.

== Playing career ==
Henare began his career playing for Carlisle before joining the Warrington Wolves in 1996. In the 1996 and 1997 seasons he played twenty-four Super League matches for the Warrington Wolves.

Richard Henare made his début for Warrington Wolves on Friday 5 April 1996, and he played his last match for Warrington Wolves on Friday 11 July 1997, he was Warrington Wolves' leading try-scorer in 1996's Super League I with 17-tries.

He later played for Swinton Lions before being released in 2000 after receiving a twelve-month ban for testing positive for cannabis.
