= Graham Shaw (cricketer) =

English cricketer

Personal information
- Full name: Graham Shaw
- Born: 14 March 1962 (age 64); Saltburn-by-the-Sea, Yorkshire, England
- Batting: Right-handed
- Bowling: Right-arm off break

Domestic team information
- Years: Team
- 1999–2000: Durham Cricket Board

Career statistics
Competition	LA
Matches	4
Runs scored	26
Batting average	8.66
100s/50s	–/–
Top score	14*
Balls bowled	42
Wickets	2
Bowling average	32.00
5 wickets in innings	–
10 wickets in match	–
Best bowling	1/27
Catches/stumpings	2/–
- Source: Cricinfo, 7 November 2010

Graham Shaw (born 14 March 1962) is a former English cricketer. Shaw was a right-handed batsman who bowled right-arm off break. He was born at Saltburn-by-the-Sea, Yorkshire.

Shaw represented the Durham Cricket Board in List A cricket. His debut List A match came against Oxfordshire in the 1999 NatWest Trophy. From 1999 to 2000, he represented the county in 4 List A matches, the last of which came against Denmark in the 2000 NatWest Trophy. In his 4 List A matches, he scored 26 runs at a batting average of 8.66, with a high score of 14*. In the field he also took 2 catches. With the ball he took 2 wickets at a bowling average of 32.00, with best figures of 1/27.
