= Chris Rudd =

English rugby league footballer

Personal information
- Born: 17 December 1969 (age 55); Cumberland

Playing information
- Position: Fullback, Wing, Centre
Club
Years	Team	Pld	T	G	FG	P
1988–98	Warrington	169	43	112	0	396
Representative
Years	Team	Pld	T	G	FG	P
1990	Cumbria	1	0	0	0	0
1991	Great Britain U-21s	2

Chris Rudd (born 17 December 1969) is an English former professional rugby league footballer who usually played as a centre. He played for Warrington at club level between 1988 and 1998, and also represented Cumbria and Great Britain Under-21's.

== Career ==
Rudd started his career with amateur club Kells, and played against Leeds in the 1988 Challenge Cup. He signed for Warrington later that year, and spent ten years with the club, making 169 appearances between 1988 and 1998.

Rudd played for Cumbria in the 10–42 defeat against Australia during the 1990 Kangaroo tour. In 1991, he played twice for Great Britain under-21s against France.
