= Graeme Shaw =

Scotland international rugby league footballer

Personal information
- Full name: Graeme Shaw
- Born: 13 June 1975 (age 51)

Playing information
- Position: Second-row
Club
Years	Team	Pld	T	G	FG	P
1994–96	Bradford Northern	1	1	0	0	4
1998–99	Oldham RLFC	2	0	0	0	0
2001–02	Keighley Cougars	11	0	0	0	0
	Total	14	1	0	0	4
Representative
Years	Team	Pld	T	G	FG	P
1998	Scotland	2	0	0	0	0

Graeme Shaw (born 13 June 1975) is a former professional rugby league footballer who played as a second-row forward in the 1990s. He played at representative level for Scotland, and at club level for Bradford Northern and Oldham.

== International honours ==
Jim Shaw won caps for Scotland while at Oldham 1998 2-caps (sub).
