= Lee Penny =

Scotland international rugby league footballer

Personal information
- Full name: Lee Penny
- Born: 24 September 1974 (age 52) Wigan, Greater Manchester, England

Playing information
- Position: Fullback
Club
Years	Team	Pld	T	G	FG	P
1992–03	Warrington Wolves	184	100	0	0	400
2003	Salford City Reds	0	0	0	0	0
	Total	184	100	0	0	400
Representative
Years	Team	Pld	T	G	FG	P
1998–03	Scotland	5	3	0	0	12
- As of 3 Oct 2021

Lee Penny is a former Scotland international rugby league footballer.

Penny was born in Wigan in 1974, he attended St Cuthberts Infant and Junior School and St Thomas More High School.

Penny played in the fullback position and was a Scotland international and played at the 2000 Rugby League World Cup.

Penny played at Warrington Wolves before moving to Salford City Reds.

He then moved on to play Rugby Union for Vale of Lune RUFC in North 1 where he spent 2 seasons.
