= Thomas Higgins =

Thomas or Tom Higgins may refer to:

== Sports ==
- Tom Higgins (Canadian football) (born 1954), American football player and coach in the Canadian Football League, also played in the United States
- Tom Higgins (footballer, born 1874) (1874–1916), English footballer
- Tom Higgins (rock climber) (1944–2018), American rock climber and author

== Others ==
- Thomas Higgins (Irish politician) (1865–1906), MP
- Thomas J. Higgins (1831–1917), American Civil War soldier, recipient of the Medal of Honor
- Thomas J. Higgins (Canadian politician) (1931–1995), Canadian educator and municipal politician
- Thomas Higgins (RAF officer) (1880–1953), British soldier and airman
- Thomas Aquinas Higgins (1932–2018), American federal judge
- Thomas Lawrence Higgins (1950–1994), American writer and gay rights activist
- Thomas Michael Higgins (born 1966), American banker and social entrepreneur
- Thomas Twistington Higgins, head surgeon at Great Ormond Street Hospital

== See also ==
- Tom O'Higgins (1916–2003), Irish politician and judge
- Thomas F. O'Higgins (1890–1953), Irish politician
