= 1894–95 Aston Villa F.C. season =

English football club season

Aston Villa
1894–95 season
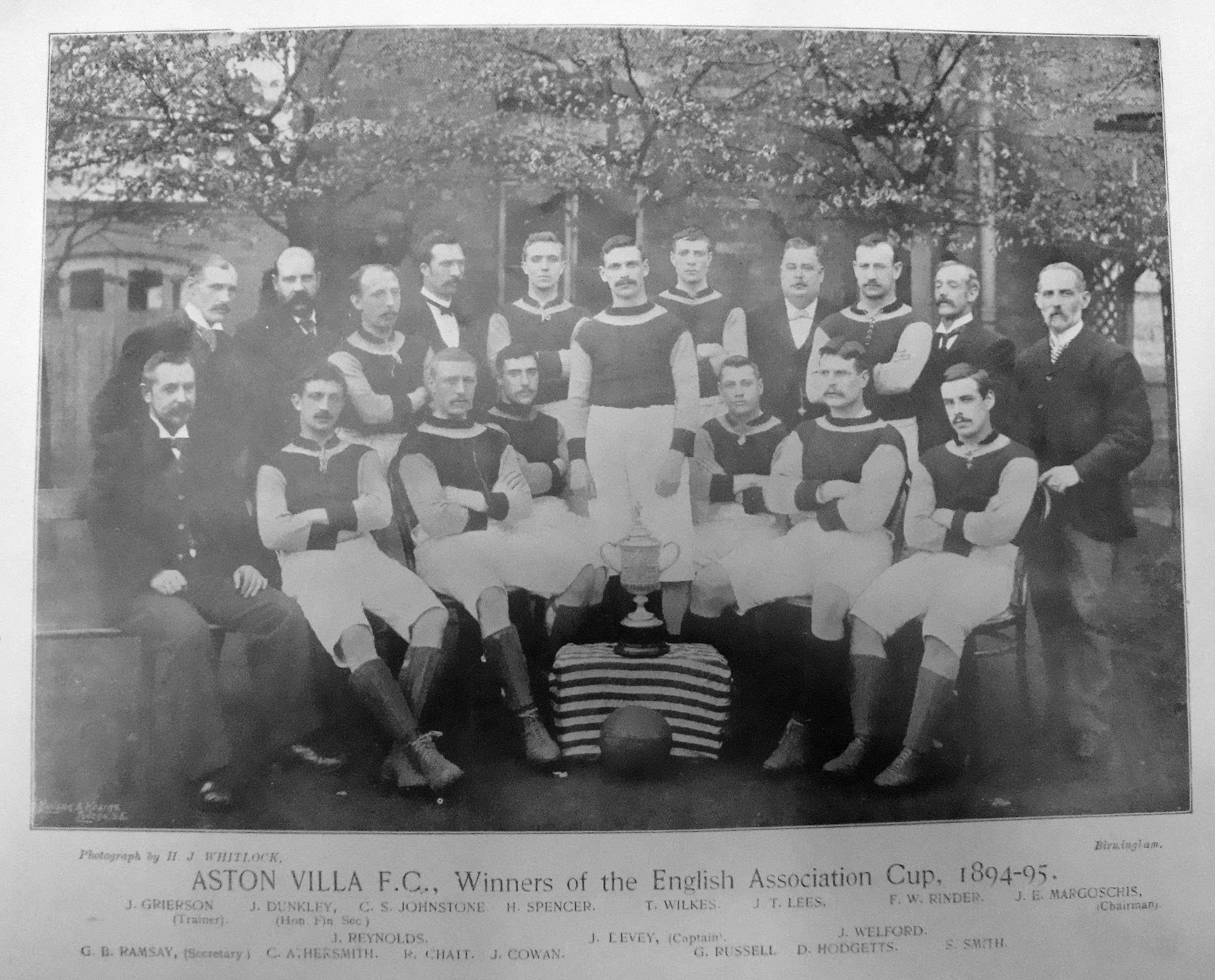
- Chairman: Joshua Margoschis
- Manager: George Ramsay
- Ground: Wellington Road
- Football League: 3rd
- FA Cup: Winners

The 1894–95 English football season was Aston Villa's 7th season in the Football League falling into what was to be called Villa's golden era. Villa started the season as League champions and, under George Ramsay's management committee, won the FA Cup for the second time. The 1894–95 Division 1 season was the first season of the First league Second City Derby with Aston Villa beating local rivals Small Heath 2–1 on 1 September 1894. Villa beat Small Heath in the final of the Mayor of Birmingham's Charity Cup.

There were debut appearances for Arthur's son, Billy Dorrell, George Kinsey, Howard Spencer, Tom Purslow, Harry Wilkes, Billy Podmore and Bob Gordon.

== FA Cup ==
2 February 1895 1st Round	Aston Villa	2–1	Derby County	Wellington Road
		Report

16 February 1895 2nd Round	Aston Villa	7–1	Newcastle United	Wellington Road
		Report

2 March 1895 3rd Round	Aston Villa	6–2	Nottingham Forest	Wellington Road
		Report

16 March 1895 Semi-final	Sunderland	1–2	Aston Villa	Ewood Park
		Report

20 April 1895 Final	West Bromwich Albion	0–1	Aston Villa	Crystal Palace
		Report		Attendance: 42,560; Referee: John Lewis
Note: The 1895 FA Cup Final was contested by Aston Villa and West Bromwich Albion at Crystal Palace. Aston Villa won 1–0, with Bob Chatt being credited with scoring the fastest goal in FA Cup Final history, scored after just 30 seconds. This record would stand for 114 years before being broken by Everton 's Louis Saha in 2009 with a goal after 25 seconds. The first trophy, the 'little tin idol', had been made by Martin, Hall & Co at a cost of £20. It was stolen from a Birmingham shoe shop window belonging to William Shillcock while held by Aston Villa on 11 September 1895 and was never seen again. Despite a £10 reward for information, the crime was never solved. As it happened while it was in their care, the FA fined Villa £25 to pay for a replacement. Just over 60 years later, 80 year old career criminal Henry (Harry) James Burge claimed to have committed the theft, confessing to a newspaper, with the story being published in the Sunday Pictorial newspaper on 23 February 1958.Burge claimed the cup had been melted down to make counterfeit half-crown coins, which matched known intelligence of the time that stolen silver was being used to forge coins which were then laundered through betting shops at a local racecourse.

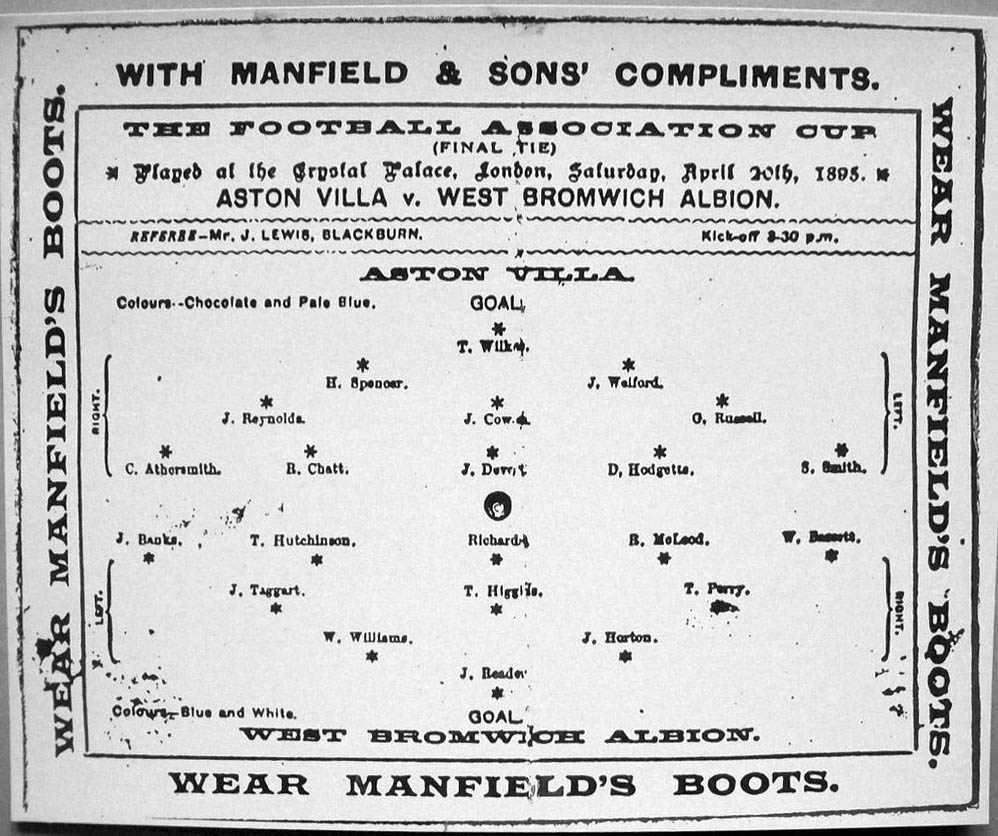

== First Division ==
Second City Derby
- 2--0--1

Pos	Team	Pld	W	D	L	GF	GA	GAv	Pts
1	Sunderland (C)	30	21	5	4	80	37	2.162	47
2	Everton	30	18	6	6	82	50	1.640	42
3	Aston Villa	30	17	5	8	82	43	1.907	39
4	Preston North End	30	15	5	10	62	46	1.348	35
5	Blackburn Rovers	30	11	10	9	59	49	1.204	32

Source: World Football
Rules for classification: 1) Points; 2) Goal average; 3) Goals scored
(C) Champions

=== Matches ===
1 Sep 1894 1	Aston Villa	2–1	Small Heath
		Report
Note: 🟩 Local-rival Small Heath's First Division campaign began on Saturday 1 September with a visit to the Reigning Champions. Villa won their second match in succession against League new boys. Forward Billy Dorrell made his Villa debut aged 22 after joining from Leicester Fosse for a fee of £250. The match turned out rather closer than predicted. Small Heath's Jack Hallam opened the scoring from a Tommy Hands cross with the first League goal of the season, "for the match was started punctually, and it would have been a sheer impossibility to score faster than the Small Heath player did." Steve Smith equalised for Villa some 20 minutes later, and a Bob Gordon goal meant they took the lead immediately afterwards, and retained that lead to the end. The Birmingham Daily Post was disappointed by Fred Wheldon, "usually the bright particular star of the front rank".

8 Sep 1894 2	Liverpool	1–2	Aston Villa
		Report
Note: 🟩

15 Sep 1894 3	Aston Villa	1–2	Sunderland
		Report
Note: 🟥

22 Sep 1894 4	Derby County	0–2	Aston Villa
		Report
Note: 🟩

29 Sep 1894 5	Stoke	4–1	Aston Villa
		Report
Note: 🟥

6 Oct 1894 6	Nottingham Forest	2–1	Aston Villa
		Report
Note: 🟥

13 Oct 1894 7	Aston Villa	3–1	West Bromwich Albion
		Report
Note: 🟩

20 Oct 1894 8	Small Heath	2–2	Aston Villa
		Report
Note: 🟨The reverse fixture in the Second City derby resulted in a 2-2 draw on 20 October 1894 with Bob Gordon and Denny Hodgetts scoring for Villa.(2-0-1)

22 Oct 1894 9	Sheffield United	2–1	Aston Villa
		Report
Note: 🟥

27 Oct 1894 10	Aston Villa	5–0	Liverpool
		Report
Note: 🟩

3 Nov 1894 11	Sheffield Wednesday	1–0	Aston Villa
		Report
Note: 🟥

10 Nov 1894 12	Aston Villa	4–1	Preston North End
		Report
Note: 🟩

12 Nov 1894 13	Aston Villa	5–0	Sheffield United
		Report
Note: 🟩 Played in driving freezing rain. Villa's players had dry clothes available, and were given hot drinks, a courtesy apparently not extended to the visitors. The Sheffield players were worse affected, several needing treatment for exposure, and by the end of the match only six were still on the field. Villa's Jack Devey put on an overcoat, and Charlie Athersmith played under an umbrella borrowed from a spectator before collapsing in the dressing-room afterwards.

17 Nov 1894 14	West Bromwich Albion	3–2	Aston Villa
		Report
Note: 🟥

24 Nov 1894 15	Aston Villa	4–1	Nottingham Forest
		Report
Note: 🟩

1 Dec 1894 16	Blackburn Rovers	1–3	Aston Villa
		Report
Note: 🟩

3 Dec 1894 17	Aston Villa	3–1	Sheffield Wednesday
		Report
Note: 🟩

8 Dec 1894 18	Aston Villa	3–0	Blackburn Rovers
		Report
Note: 🟩

22 Dec 1894 19	Wolverhampton Wanderers	0–4	Aston Villa
		Report
Note: 🟩 Villa registered the biggest away win in the League

26 Dec 1894 20	Aston Villa	6–0	Stoke
		Report
Note: 🟩

2 Jan 1895 21	Sunderland	4–4	Aston Villa
		Report
Note: 🟨

5 Jan 1895 22	Aston Villa	4–0	Derby County
		Report
Note: 🟩

12 Jan 1895 23	Preston North End	0–1	Aston Villa
		Report
Note: 🟩

17 Jan 1895 24	Everton	4–2	Aston Villa
		Report
Note: 🟥

26 Jan 1895 25	Aston Villa	2–1	Bolton Wanderers
		Report
Note: 🟩

23 Feb 1895 26	Burnley	3–3	Aston Villa
		Report
Note: 🟨

23 Mar 1895 27	Bolton Wanderers	4–3	Aston Villa
		Report
Note: 🟥

6 Apr 1895 28	Aston Villa	5–0	Burnley
	Billy Dorrell(2), Dennis Hodgetts, Charlie Athersmith, Bob Chatt	Report
Note: 🟩 A Rainy morning, followed by a boisterous gale, influenced a meagre crowd of no more than 3,000.

15 Apr 1895 29	Aston Villa	2–2	Wolverhampton Wanderers
		Report
Note: 🟨

24 Apr 1895 30	Aston Villa	2–2	Everton
		Report
Note: 🟨 Sunderland win the championship with a 2–1 scoreline and rendered Everton's final game meaningless. As it was, Everton could only draw that game at Aston Villa 2–2, a result which would have taken the title to Sunderland regardless.

Source: avfchistory.co.uk

== Charity Cup ==
Small Heath took on Aston Villa in their last match of the season, the final of the Birmingham Charity Cup. Unfortunately for the charities, the weather was poor and the attendance low, but those spectators present saw an exciting game. Wheldon scored first with a fierce shot that entered the net off the goalkeeper and the underside of the bar, then Bob Chatt equalised from a free kick and Charlie Athersmith outpaced Oliver and his parried shot was forced over the line. Mobley tied the scores with a long shot, but in the second half with the wind behind them, Villa scored three times to Jack Hallam's one to take the match 5–3.

== Reserves ==
After finishing in the runners-up position twice in the first 2 seasons of the competition, Aston Villa Reserves finally won their first Birmingham & District League trophy in the 1894–95 season, winning 26 out of 30 league games and losing just once all season.
