= Elizabeth Twistington Higgins =

British ballet dancer, painter (1923–1990)

Elizabeth Twistington Higgins MBE
- Twistington Higgins, with a painting tool in her mouth, from a 1960 publication.
- Born: Elizabeth Patricia Twistington Higgins; 6 November 1923; London, England
- Died: 12 September 1990 (aged 66)
- Occupations: Dancer, painter
- Known for: Arts career after surviving polio in 1953

Elizabeth Twistington Higgins MBE (6 November 1923 – 12 September 1990) was a British ballet dancer, and later a painter.

== Early life ==
Elizabeth Patricia Twistington Higgins was born in London in 1923, one of the six children of Thomas Twistington Higgins. Her father was an Army surgeon in France during World War I, and later a pediatric urological surgeon. Her older brother was Ian Thomas Twistington Higgins (1919–2006), a noted epidemiologist. She trained as a dancer at the Royal Ballet School at Sadler's Wells.

== Career ==
Twistington was a professional ballet dancer and teacher in her twenties, until she contracted polio in 1953. She was paralysed below the neck, and used an iron lung and a wheelchair the rest of her life. She retrained as a painter, holding and controlling the brush with her lips; her subjects were usually still life or ballet themes. She used an adapted easel and other custom devices designed by Roger Jefcoate. She was a member of the Association of Mouth and Foot Painting Artists, and her paintings were exhibited internationally. She directed a liturgical dance troupe, the Chelmsford Dancers, and continued to teach, choreograph, and design costumes for dance.

On her birthday in 1961, Twistington was the subject of an episode of This Is Your Life, a weekly BBC television programme. Most subjects were surprised to be featured, but because there were concerns that she would be harmed by a sudden shock, she was briefed ahead of the show. She wrote a memoir, Still Life, published in 1969. In 1975, she appeared on the Christian inspirational programme Seeing and Believing, and she was featured in an informational film about assistive devices for disabled telephone users in 1977. In 1980, she was the subject of a documentary film, The Dance Goes On, narrated by Rudolf Nureyev, with an appearance by Joanna Lumley; she was also the subject of a book of the same name, by Marc Alexander.

Twistington Higgins was appointed a Member of the Order of the British Empire in 1977, for her services to the arts.

== Death ==
Twistington Higgins died in 1990, aged 66 years.
