= The Dance Goes On =

The Dance Goes On may refer to:

- The Dance Goes On (1930 film), an American crime film
- The Dance Goes On (1980 film), an American documentary film
