= Bob Chatt =

English footballer

Personal information
- Full name: Robert Samuel Chatt
- Date of birth: 1869
- Place of birth: Barnard Castle, Durham, England
- Date of death: 1955 (aged 84–85)
- Place of death: Durham, England
- Positions: Wing half; inside forward

Youth career
- 1888–1889: Cleator Moor

Senior career*
Years	Team	Apps	(Gls)
1889–1893	Middlesbrough Ironopolis		
1893–1898	Aston Villa	86	(19)
1898–1899	Stockton		
1899–1900	South Shields		
1900–190?	Willington Athletic		
- * Club domestic league appearances and goals

Robert Samuel Chatt (August 1870 – c. 1955) was an English footballer who was a member of the Aston Villa team which won the Football League championship three times in the 1890s. Chatt was credited with scoring the fastest goal in FA Cup final history, scored after just 30 seconds in the 1895 FA Cup final. This record stood for 114 years until Louis Saha of Everton scored after 25 seconds against Chelsea in the 2009 final. His brother, Fred, played for Burton Wanderers.

Chatt later won the FA Amateur Cup with Stockton and is the only player to have winner's medals for both the FA Cup and the FA Amateur Cup.

== Career ==
=== Aston Villa ===
Chatt was born in Barnard Castle, County Durham and played football for Cleator Moor and Middlesbrough Ironopolis before joining Aston Villa for a nominal fee in August 1893.

In his first season with Aston Villa (where his teammates included James Welford and later Albert Evans, both also from Barnard Castle) he made 17 appearances generally playing at left half, from where he scored five goals in league matches and four in the FA Cup. His goals included six scored in a run of two goals per match in three consecutive matches in March. At the end of the season, Villa claimed their first Football League title by a margin of six points over Sunderland, having scored 84 goals in 30 games, with only five defeats.

Chatt became a regular member of the side in the 1894–95 season, when he was pushed forward to play as an inside forward. Chatt only missed three league games, scoring ten league goals, as Aston Villa finished the season in third place, eight points behind the champions, Sunderland.

In the FA Cup, Villa defeated Nottingham Forest 6–2 in the third round with two goals each from Chatt and Stephen Smith, to set up a semi-final against Sunderland. Two further goals from Smith despatched Sunderland and Villa were in the final for the third time where they once again met local rivals, West Bromwich Albion, against whom they had played in their two previous finals, winning 2–0 in 1887 and losing 3–0 in 1892.

The final on 20 April 1895 was played for the first time at Crystal Palace, which was to host the finals for the next twenty years. The weather for the final was described as "a beautiful spring day". Consequently, the crowd and press were still coming into the ground when the game kicked off. From the kick-off, John Devey, the Villa centre-forward, swung the ball out to his inside-left, Dennis Hodgetts. Hodgetts' long cross-pass found Charlie Athersmith on the right. His centre fell to Chatt, who sent the ball goalwards on a half-volley. Albion's keeper Joe Reader was only able to get his fingers to the shot and turned the ball across the goal mouth and, after a goalmouth scramble involving Devey and Albion defender Jack Horton, the ball was turned into the net. There are no accurate timings for the goal and different reports time it at between 30 and 39 seconds. At the time, many of the crowd and press missed the goal as they were still taking their seats, and the press reports indicated that Chatt had scored. According to Ward & Griffin in their "Essential History of Aston Villa" however, "after the game, the Villa players confirmed that John Devey had netted after Chatt's shot had been blocked straight into the latter's path and had ricocheted off his knee." Despite this claim, The Football Association still credit the goal to Chatt as having been scored on thirty seconds. Chatt's record stood for 114 years until beaten by Louis Saha's effort for Everton after 25 seconds in 2009.

Despite pressure from the Albion forwards, especially from Billy Bassett, Villa held on to their lead until half-time. In the second half, Villa began to press forward again, with Chatt and Devey forcing excellent saves from Joe Reader. Neither side was able to add to the score, and Villa won the cup for the second time.

For the 1895–96 season, Chatt was moved back to centre-half to accommodate Johnny Campbell who had arrived from Celtic during the summer and the season started badly for Villa when they lost the FA Cup trophy. On 11 September, the trophy was on display in a football outfitter's window when the shop was broken into, and the trophy and some cash were taken. The trophy was never recovered, and Villa were fined £25 by the Football Association. On the pitch, Chatt made 17 appearances in the league, as Villa took the title by four points over Derby County with Campbell top-scorer on 26 goals. As Philip Gibbons pointed out in "Association Football in Victorian England": "Aston Villa had twice won the League Championship, as well as the FA Cup, during the three previous seasons, with a team generally acknowledged as the finest in the land."

The following year Chatt continued at half-back but was no longer a regular choice, with Jack Reynolds, James Cowan and Jimmy Crabtree forming a well-established half-back line. During Villa's double winning season, Chatt made eleven league and one cup appearance, scoring a single goal, in a 2–1 victory at Wolverhampton Wanderers on Boxing Day.

Chatt continued in defence for one more season, when Villa finished in a disappointing sixth place, before retiring from professional football in June 1898. In his five years with Villa, Chatt made 94 appearances, scoring 26 goals.

=== Later career ===
On leaving Villa, Chatt was reinstated as an amateur player and joined Stockton. He was part of the Stockton team that claimed the FA Amateur Cup with a 1–0 victory over Harwich & Parkeston in his first season.

He also played for South Shields and Willington Athletic before becoming the trainer of Doncaster Rovers (1904–1905). He held similar posts with Port Vale (1905–1906), Manchester City (1906–1916), South Shields (1919), Caerphilly (1921–1922) and Newport County (1922–1931). He also scouted for Aston Villa.

== Career statistics ==
Appearances and goals by club, season and competition
Club	Season	League			FA Cup		Total	
Club	Season	Division	Apps	Goals	Apps	Goals	Apps	Goals
Aston Villa	1892–93	First Division	1	0	0	0	1	0
Aston Villa	1893–94	First Division	13	5	4	4	17	9
Aston Villa	1894–95	First Division	27	10	3	3	30	13
Aston Villa	1895–96	First Division	17	3	1	0	18	3
Aston Villa	1896–97	First Division	11	1	1	0	12	1
Aston Villa	1897–98	First Division	17	0	0	0	17	0
Aston Villa	Total		86	19	9	7	95	26

== Honours ==
Aston Villa

- English Football League: 1893–94, 1895–96, 1896–97
- FA Cup: 1895

Stockton

- FA Amateur Cup: 1899
