= James Welford =

English footballer and cricketer

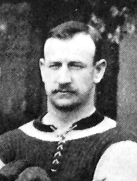

Personal information
- Full name: James William Welford
- Date of birth: 27 March 1869
- Place of birth: Barnard Castle, England
- Date of death: 17 January 1945 (aged 75)
- Place of death: Paisley, Scotland
- Position: Right back

Youth career
- Barnard Castle

Senior career*
Years	Team	Apps	(Gls)
- Stockton
- Bishop Auckland
- Birmingham St George's
1893–1897	Aston Villa	79	(1)
1897–1901	Celtic	38	(0)
1900	→ Belfast Celtic (loan)		
1900–1901	→ Distillery (loan)		
1901–1907	Hamilton Academical	46	(1)
- * Club domestic league appearances and goals

James William Welford (27 March 1869 – 17 January 1945) was an English cricketer and footballer. He won both the Football League (three times) and FA Cup with Aston Villa, and the Scottish Football League and Scottish Cup with Celtic, all in a seven-year period in the 1890s.

In cricket, Welford was a right-handed batsman who bowled right-arm fast.

== Football ==
Welford was born in Barnard Castle, County Durham; his playing position was as a full-back. He had played locally for Stockton and Bishop Auckland before joining Birmingham St George's, from where he joined Aston Villa in 1893. He played there until 1897, making a total of 83 appearances in both League and Cup, scoring one goal. While at Villa (where his teammates included Bob Chatt, also from Barnard Castle), he won the FA Cup in 1895 and claimed three Football League titles in 1893–94, 1895–96 and 1896–97, although by the latter season he was no longer a regular, possibly due to injury – coincidentally the man who took his place in the side, Albert Evans, was another player from Barnard Castle, situated about 170 miles (270 km) from Birmingham; his absence meant he missed out on the rare opportunity to become a 'double' winner as he took no part in the 1897 FA Cup Final victory.

From Aston Villa Welford moved to Celtic in Scotland, being enticed north along with teammates John Campbell and Jack Reynolds. He played for Celtic for three seasons and won the Scottish Football League in 1897–98, followed by the Scottish Cup in 1899, followed swiftly by the Glasgow Merchants Charity Cup, both knockout trophies won by way of 2–0 victories over local rivals Rangers. He later had spells in the Irish League with Belfast Celtic and Distillery, and with Hamilton Academical in Scotland's lower division, adding a 1903–04 Scottish Division Two winner's medal to his collection.

== Cricket ==
James Welford
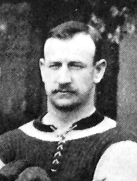

Cricket information
- Batting: Right-handed
- Bowling: Right-arm fast

Domestic team information
- Years: Team
- 1896: Warwickshire
- 1895: Durham

Career statistics
Competition	First-class
Matches	13
Runs scored	459
Batting average	21.85
100s/50s	1/1
Top score	118
Balls bowled	280
Wickets	2
Bowling average	90.00
5 wickets in innings	–
10 wickets in match	–
Best bowling	1/13
Catches/stumpings	2/–
- Source: Cricinfo, 30 August 2011

Welford made his debut for Durham in the 1895 Minor Counties Championship against Cheshire. He made five further appearances in that season for the county. He joined Warwickshire for the 1896 season, making his first-class debut for the county in the County Championship against Surrey. He made 12 further first-class appearances in 1896, the last of which came against Hampshire. In this thirteen first-class appearances for Warwickshire, he scored 459 runs at an average of 21.85, with a high score of 118. This score, which was his only first-class century, came against Leicestershire. With the ball, he took 2 wickets at a bowling average of 90.00, with best figures of 1/13.

He died in Paisley, Scotland on 17 January 1945.
