= George Russell (footballer, born 1869) =

Scottish footballer (1869–1930)

Personal information
- Full name: George Russell
- Date of birth: August 1869
- Place of birth: Ayr, Scotland
- Date of death: 1930 (aged 60–61)
- Position: Wing half

Senior career*
Years	Team	Apps	(Gls)
1891–1893	Ayr		
1893–1895	Aston Villa	32	(1)
1895	Glasgow United		
Total		32	(1)
- * Club domestic league appearances and goals

George Russell (August 1869 – 1930) was a Scottish footballer who played in the Football League for Aston Villa with whom he played in and won the 1895 FA Cup Final.
