= Billy Dorrell =

English footballer

Personal information
- Full name: William Dorrell
- Date of birth: 1872
- Place of birth: Leicester, England
- Date of death: 1939 (aged 66–67)
- Position: Winger

Senior career*
| Years | Team | Apps | (Gls) |
| 1889–1892 | Singer's | | |
| 1892–1894 | Leicester Fosse | 43 | (16) |
| 1894–1896 | Aston Villa | 11 | (5) |
| 1896–1899 | Leicester Fosse | 59 | (22) |
| 1899–1905 | Belper | | |
| 1905–1906 | Burslem Port Vale | 0 | (0) |
| Total | | 113 | (43) |
- * Club domestic league appearances and goals

William Dorrell (1872 – 1939) was an English professional footballer who played as a winger. His son, Arthur Dorrell, played for Aston Villa, Port Vale, and England.

== Career ==
Dorrell was scouted by Leicester Fosse playing for Singer's and was transferred in 1892. He replaced Jimmy Atter on the left-wing, and impressed enough to win a £250 transfer move to Aston Villa in May 1894. He scored five goals in 11 First Division appearances for the "Villans", though he was allowed to rejoin Leicester Fosse in March 1896. He scored 24 goals in 63 appearances during his second spell at the club, who were now in the Second Division.

== Personal life ==
Dorrell was listed as a licensed victualler in the 1901 census and as a turner in the 1911 census. He had four children with his first wife, Clara, including England international footballer Arthur Dorrell. He remarried to Maria and had another child by 1911. By 1921 he was with his third wife, Alice Frederica, with whom he had another child named William Ray Stephen.

== Career statistics ==
Appearances and goals by club, season and competition
| Club | Season | League | | | FA Cup | | Total | |
| Club | Season | Division | Apps | Goals | Apps | Goals | Apps | Goals |
|---|---|---|---|---|---|---|---|---|
| Leicester Fosse | 1892–93 | Midland League | 24 | 8 | 4 | 7 | 28 | 15 |
| Leicester Fosse | 1893–94 | Midland League | 19 | 8 | 6 | 2 | 25 | 10 |
| Leicester Fosse | Total | | 43 | 16 | 10 | 9 | 53 | 25 |
| Aston Villa | 1894–95 | First Division | 9 | 4 | 1 | 2 | 10 | 6 |
| Aston Villa | 1895–96 | First Division | 2 | 1 | 0 | 0 | 2 | 1 |
| Aston Villa | Total | | 11 | 5 | 1 | 2 | 12 | 7 |
| Leicester Fosse | 1895–96 | Second Division | 6 | 2 | 0 | 0 | 6 | 2 |
| Leicester Fosse | 1896–97 | Second Division | 26 | 12 | 3 | 2 | 29 | 14 |
| Leicester Fosse | 1897–98 | Second Division | 26 | 8 | 1 | 0 | 27 | 8 |
| Leicester Fosse | 1898–99 | Second Division | 1 | 0 | 0 | 0 | 1 | 0 |
| Leicester Fosse | Total | | 59 | 22 | 4 | 2 | 63 | 24 |
| Burslem Port Vale | 1905–06 | Second Division | 0 | 0 | 0 | 0 | 0 | 0 |
| Career total | | | 113 | 43 | 15 | 13 | 128 | 56 |
