= Tom Hutchinson (Scottish footballer) =

Scottish footballer

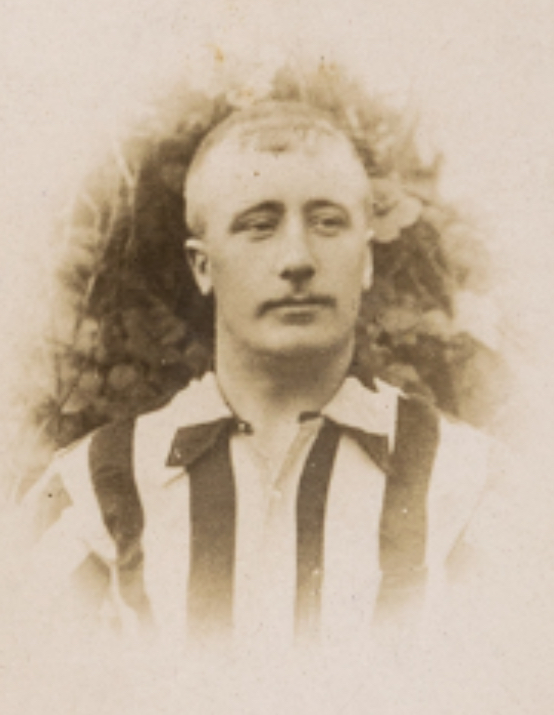

Personal information
- Date of birth: 20 June 1872
- Place of birth: Glasgow, Scotland
- Date of death: 1933 (aged 60 or 61)
- Place of death: Cheshire, England
- Position: Centre-forward

Senior career*
Years	Team	Apps	(Gls)
1891–1893	Darlington		
1893–1894	Newcastle United		
1894	Nelson		
1894–1896	West Bromwich Albion		
1896	Celtic		
1897	Abercorn		
1897	Stockport County		
1899–1904	Ellesmere Port		
- * Club domestic league appearances and goals

Thomas Hutchinson (20 June 1872 – 1933) was a Scottish footballer who played as a centre-forward.

== Biography ==
Hutchinson was born in Glasgow. He turned professional with Darlington in August 1891 before moving on to Newcastle United in October 1893. He joined Nelson in January 1894 and in July of that year signed for West Bromwich Albion for a £50 fee. He made his Albion debut in September 1894 in an away match at Sheffield United. He played in the 1895 FA Cup Final, which Albion lost to local rivals Aston Villa.

In July 1896 he moved to Celtic where he played two league games but then moved to Abercorn.

In 1897 he moved to Stockport County on a free transfer, but retired in May 1897 due to injury. He recovered sufficiently to make a comeback with Ellesmere Port in 1899, finally retiring for good in 1904. He died in Cheshire in 1933.
