= Billy Richards (footballer, born 1874) =

English footballer

Personal information
- Full name: William Richards
- Date of birth: 6 October 1874
- Place of birth: West Bromwich, England
- Date of death: 12 February 1926 (aged 51)
- Place of death: West Bromwich, England
- Position: Centre forward

Senior career*
Years	Team	Apps	(Gls)
–	Wordsley		
–	Singer's		
–	West Bromwich Standard		
1894–1901	West Bromwich Albion	123	(35)
1901–1902	Newton Heath	9	(1)
1902–1904	Stourbridge		
1904–1907	Halesowen Town		
- * Club domestic league appearances and goals

William Richards (6 October 1874 – 12 February 1926) was an English footballer who played as a centre forward.

He played in the Football League for West Bromwich Albion and Newton Heath.

== Biography ==
Richards was born in West Bromwich and turned professional with West Bromwich Albion in July 1894. He scored on his debut to help Albion beat Wolves 5–1 in September 1894. Richards picked up a runners-up medal in the 1895 FA Cup Final and was the club's top scorer in the 1895–96 and 1898–99 seasons. He was transferred to Newton Heath in April 1901 for a £40 fee and the following year moved to Stourbridge on a free transfer. In September 1904 he joined Halesowen Town, where he ended his playing career, retiring in April 1907. He died in West Bromwich in 1926.
