= 1894–95 FA Cup =

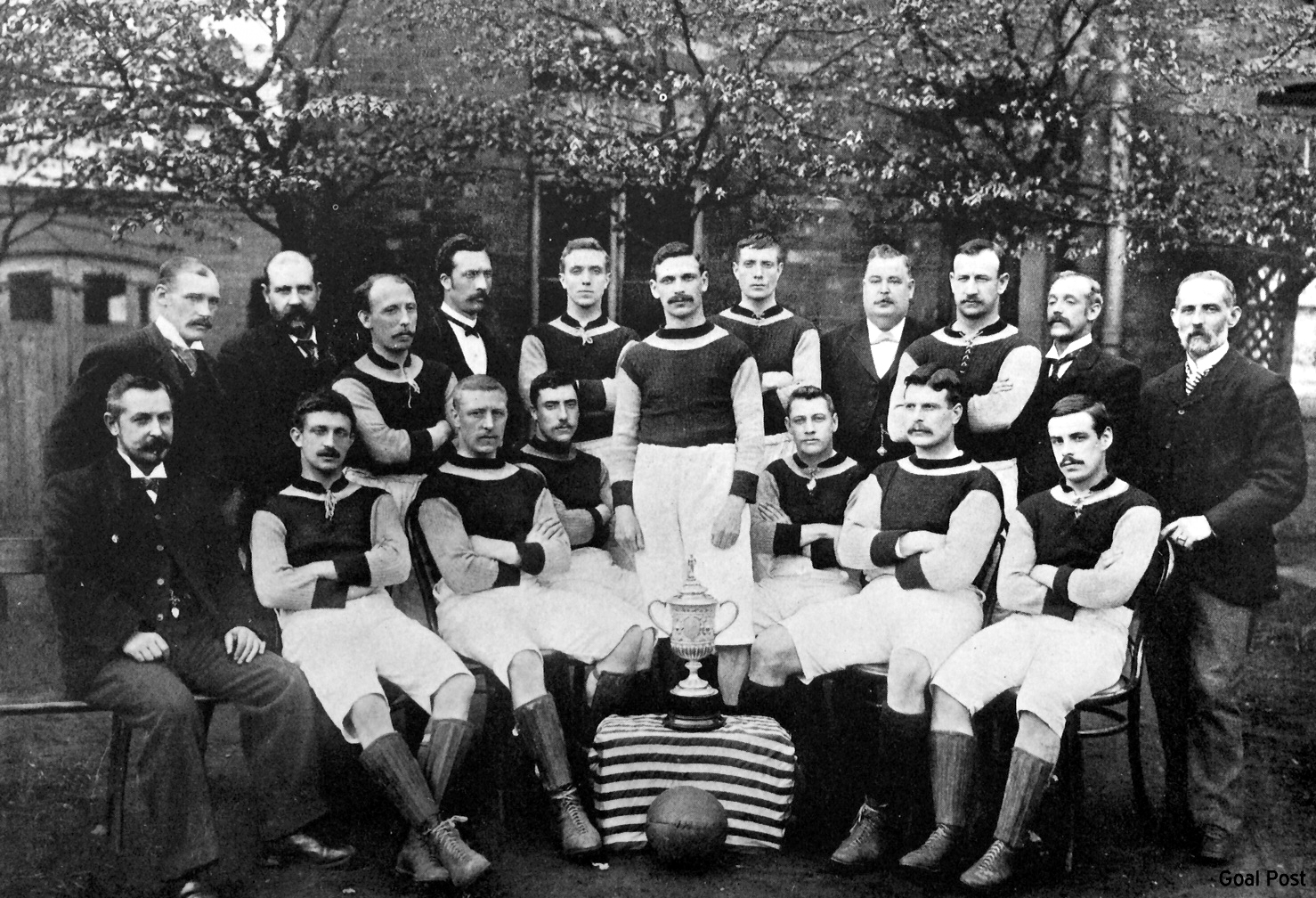
- The Aston Villa team following the final

Tournament details
- Country: England; Wales

Final positions
- Champions: Aston Villa (2nd title)
- Runners-up: West Bromwich Albion

The 1894–95 FA Cup was the 24th season of the world's oldest association football competition, the Football Association Challenge Cup (more usually known as the FA Cup). The cup was won by Aston Villa, who defeated West Bromwich Albion 1–0 in the final of the competition, played at Crystal Palace in London. This was Villa's second victory in the FA Cup.

The Trophy was stolen from a display in the shop window of W. Shillcock (a football fitter) in Newton Row, Birmingham, after the final and never recovered despite a £10 reward. According to the Police, it was taken sometime between 21:30 on Wednesday 11 September and 7:30 the following morning, along with cash from a drawer. The cup was replaced by a copy of the original, made by Howard Vaughton, the former Aston Villa player and England international, who had opened a silversmith's business after his retirement from the game.

Matches were scheduled to be played at the stadium of the team named first on the date specified for each round, which was always a Saturday. If scores were level after 90 minutes had been played, a replay would take place at the stadium of the second-named team later the same week. If the replayed match was drawn further replays would be held at neutral venues until a winner was determined. If scores were level after 90 minutes had been played in a replay, a 30-minute period of extra time would be played.

== Calendar ==
The format of the FA Cup for the season had a preliminary round, four qualifying rounds, three proper rounds, and the semi-finals and final.

Round	Start date
Preliminary round	Saturday 6 October 1894
First round qualifying	Saturday 13 October 1894
Second round qualifying	Saturday 3 November 1894
Third round qualifying	Saturday 24 November 1894
Fourth round qualifying	Saturday 15 December 1894
First round proper	Saturday 2 February 1895
Second round proper	Saturday 16 February 1895
Third round proper	Saturday 2 March 1895
Semi-finals	Saturday 16 March 1895
Final	Saturday 20 April 1895

== Qualifying rounds ==
The 16 First Division sides were all given byes to the first round, as were Notts County, Darwen, Bury, Newcastle United, Newton Heath and Woolwich Arsenal from the Second Division. The other Second Division sides were entered into the first qualifying round, with the exceptions of Burton Swifts, who started in the second qualifying round, and Manchester City, who did not enter the competition this season. Of the qualifying League sides, only Burton Wanderers and Leicester Fosse progressed to the FA Cup proper. Eight non-league sides also qualified, these being Southport Central, Middlesbrough, Barnsley St Peter's, Fairfield, Chesterfield, Luton Town, Millwall Athletic and Southampton St Mary's. Future Cup champions Barnsley and Southampton were competing at this stage for the first time, as were Chesterfield and Fairfield.

== First round proper ==
The first round proper contained sixteen ties between 32 teams. The matches were played on Saturday, 2 February 1895. One match was drawn, with the replay taking place in the following midweek fixture. The Barnsley St Peter's – Liverpool game was voided following a dispute over extra time being played. The match was replayed nine days later, resulting in a 4–0 win to Liverpool.

Tie no	Home team	Score	Away team	Date
1	Darwen	0–0	Wolverhampton Wanderers	2 February 1895
Replay	Wolverhampton Wanderers	2–0	Darwen	6 February 1895
2	Bury	4–1	Leicester Fosse	2 February 1895
3	Aston Villa	2–1	Derby County	2 February 1895
4	The Wednesday	5–1	Notts County	2 February 1895
5	Bolton Wanderers	1–0	Woolwich Arsenal	2 February 1895
6	Southport Central	0–3	Everton	2 February 1895
7	Middlesbrough	4–0	Chesterfield	2 February 1895
8	Sunderland	11–1	Fairfield	2 February 1895
9	Luton Town	0–2	Preston North End	2 February 1895
10	Burton Wanderers	1–2	Blackburn Rovers	2 February 1895
11	Newton Heath	2–3	Stoke	2 February 1895
12	Small Heath	1–2	West Bromwich Albion	2 February 1895
13	Sheffield United	3–1	Millwall Athletic	2 February 1895
14	Southampton St Mary's	1–4	Nottingham Forest	2 February 1895
15	Newcastle United	2–1	Burnley	2 February 1895
16	Barnsley St Peter's	2–1 (Match void)	Liverpool	2 February 1895
Replay	Liverpool	4–0	Barnsley St Peter's	11 February 1895

== Second round proper ==
The eight Second Round matches were scheduled for Saturday, 16 February 1895. There were two replays, played in the following midweek fixture.

Tie no	Home team	Score	Away team	Date
1	Liverpool	0–2	Nottingham Forest	16 February 1895
2	Aston Villa	7–1	Newcastle United	16 February 1895
3	The Wednesday	6–1	Middlesbrough	16 February 1895
4	Bolton Wanderers	1–0	Bury	16 February 1895
5	Wolverhampton Wanderers	2–0	Stoke	16 February 1895
6	Sunderland	2–0	Preston North End	16 February 1895
7	Everton	1–1	Blackburn Rovers	16 February 1895
Replay	Blackburn Rovers	2–3	Everton	20 February 1895
8	Sheffield United	1–1	West Bromwich Albion	16 February 1895
Replay	West Bromwich Albion	2–1	Sheffield United	20 February 1895

== Third round proper ==
The four Third Round matches were scheduled for Saturday, 2 March 1895. There were no replays.

Tie no	Home team	Score	Away team	Date
1	Aston Villa	6–2	Nottingham Forest	2 March 1895
2	The Wednesday	2–0	Everton	2 March 1895
3	West Bromwich Albion	1–0	Wolverhampton Wanderers	2 March 1895
4	Sunderland	2–1	Bolton Wanderers	2 March 1895

== Semi-finals ==
The semi-final matches were both played on Saturday, 16 March 1895. Aston Villa and West Bromwich Albion went on to meet in the final at Crystal Palace.

16 March 1895

Aston Villa	2–1	Sunderland

Ewood Park, Blackburn

16 March 1895

West Bromwich Albion	2–0	The Wednesday

Racecourse Ground, Derby

== Final ==
The final was contested by Aston Villa and West Bromwich Albion at Crystal Palace. Aston Villa won 1–0, with Bob Chatt being credited with scoring the fastest goal in FA Cup Final history, scored after just 30 seconds. Devey found Hodgetts, whose cross was laid off by Athersmith to Chatt, whose half volley took a deflection.

=== Match details ===
20 April 1895

Aston Villa	1–0	West Bromwich Albion
Chatt 1'

Crystal Palace, London
Attendance: 42,560
Referee: J Lewis

Aston Villa	West Bromwich Albion

== See also ==
- FA Cup Final Results 1872-
