= Jack Taggart (footballer) =

Irish association footballer

Personal information
- Full name: Jack Taggart
- Date of birth: 3 February 1872
- Place of birth: Belfast, Ireland
- Date of death: 1927 (aged 54–55)
- Position: Wing half

Senior career*
Years	Team	Apps	(Gls)
1890–1891	Distillery		
1891–1892	Middlesbrough		
1892–1896	West Bromwich Albion	68	(4)
1896–1901	Walsall	113	(1)
Total		181	(5)

International career
1899	Ireland	1	(0)
- * Club domestic league appearances and goals

Jack Taggart (3 February 1872 – 1927) was an Irish footballer who played in the Football League for West Bromwich Albion where played in the 1895 FA Cup Final, where they lost 1–0 against Aston Villa.
