= Albert Evans (footballer, born 1874) =

English footballer and manager

Personal information
- Full name: Albert James Evans
- Date of birth: 18 March 1874
- Place of birth: Barnard Castle, England
- Date of death: 24 March 1966 (aged 92)
- Place of death: Warwick, England
- Position: Left back

Senior career*
Years	Team	Apps	(Gls)
1890–????	Barnard Castle		
1896–1907	Aston Villa	178	(0)
1907–1909	West Bromwich Albion	37	(0)

International career
1900	Football League XI	1	(0)

Managerial career
- 1920–1924: Coventry City
- * Club domestic league appearances and goals

Albert James Evans (18 March 1874 – 24 March 1966) was an English professional football left back who made over 170 appearances in the Football League for Aston Villa. After his retirement as a player he managed Coventry City and coached Aston Villa and Sarpsborg FK.

== Career ==
=== Player ===
Following a spell at his hometown team, non-league Barnard Castle, Evans was signed for Aston Villa by secretary George Ramsay on the advice of player Bob Chatt (also from Barnard Castle) in August 1896. He soon took the place of James Welford – coincidentally another Barnard Castle man –and played a total of 206 games for Villa, achieving major success as the club won three Football League championships in his time, including a 'double' with the FA Cup in 1896–97.

In 1907 Evans signed for West Bromwich Albion, but remained there only until December 1908 when a broken leg – one of many that he had suffered in his career – forced him to retire from the professional game.

=== Manager ===
When Harry Pollitt departed as manager of Coventry City in the summer of 1920, the club appointed Evans as his replacement. Evans signed some exciting new players such as Jerry Best and Jimmy Dougall but the 1920–21 season, City's second in the Football League, was largely unsuccessful. They spent most of it in last place and were saved only through a run of six wins and two draws in their final nine games. They remained poor on the field in 1921–22, escaping relegation by one point. Eighteenth- and nineteenth-place finishes followed in the subsequent two seasons and in 1924–25 and, facing their sixth relegation battle in a row, Coventry finally succumbed and were relegated to the Third Division North. It looked for a while as if they would stage another dramatic escape, climbing out of the relegation zone in March, but the form was not sustained and they slipped back to last place. Evans left the club in November 1924 and at the end of the season James Kerr was named as his replacement.

Evans briefly returned to football after his return to England from international travel, working as a coach for Aston Villa between 1950 and 1956.

== Personal life ==
Evans served as a corporal in the Royal Warwickshire Regiment during the First World War. Evans travelled overseas between 1924 and 1950, finding employment as he travelled, including sheep farming and gold prospecting in Canada. He returned to England in 1950.

Evans died on 24 March 1966 in Warwick, at the age of 92.

== Honours ==
Aston Villa

- Football League First Division: 1896–97, 1898–99, 1899–1900
- FA Cup: 1896–97

== Career statistics ==
Club	Season	League			FA Cup		Total	
Club	Season	Division	Apps	Goals	Apps	Goals	Apps	Goals
Aston Villa	1896–97	First Division	15	0	7	0	22	0
Aston Villa	1897–98	First Division	30	0	1	0	31	0
Aston Villa	1898–99	First Division	28	0	1	0	29	0
Aston Villa	1899–1900	First Division	26	0	6	0	32	0
Aston Villa	1900–01	First Division	25	0	6	0	31	0
Aston Villa	1901–02	First Division	4	0	0	0	4	0
Aston Villa	1902–03	First Division	18	0	0	0	18	0
Aston Villa	1903–04	First Division	14	0	1	0	15	0
Aston Villa	1904–05	First Division	4	0	1	0	5	0
Aston Villa	1905–06	First Division	14	0	1	0	15	0
Aston Villa	Total		178	0	24	0	202	0
West Bromwich Albion	1907–08	Second Division	19	0	3	0	22	0
West Bromwich Albion	1908–09	Second Division	18	0	0	0	18	0
West Bromwich Albion	Total		37	0	3	0	40	0
Career total			215	0	27	0	242	0
