= Bob Gordon (footballer) =

Scottish footballer

Personal information
- Full name: Robert Gordon
- Date of birth: July 1870
- Place of birth: Leith, Scotland
- Date of death: 1938 (aged 67–68)
- Position: Centre forward

Senior career*
Years	Team	Apps	(Gls)
1888–1889	Edinburgh Thistle		
1889–1890	Leith Rangers		
1890–1891	Leith Athletic		
1891–1892	Heart of Midlothian		
1892–1893	Middlesbrough Ironopolis		
1893–1894	Heart of Midlothian		
1894	Aston Villa	4	(2)
1894–1895	Leicester Fosse	21	(12)
1895–1896	Woolwich Arsenal	20	(6)
1896	Reading		
1897	Forfar Athletic		
1898	St Bernard's		
Total		45	(20)
- * Club domestic league appearances and goals

Robert Gordon (July 1870 – 1938) was a Scottish footballer who played in the Football League for Aston Villa, Leicester Fosse and Woolwich Arsenal.
