= Thomas Michael Higgins =

American entrepreneur (born 1966)

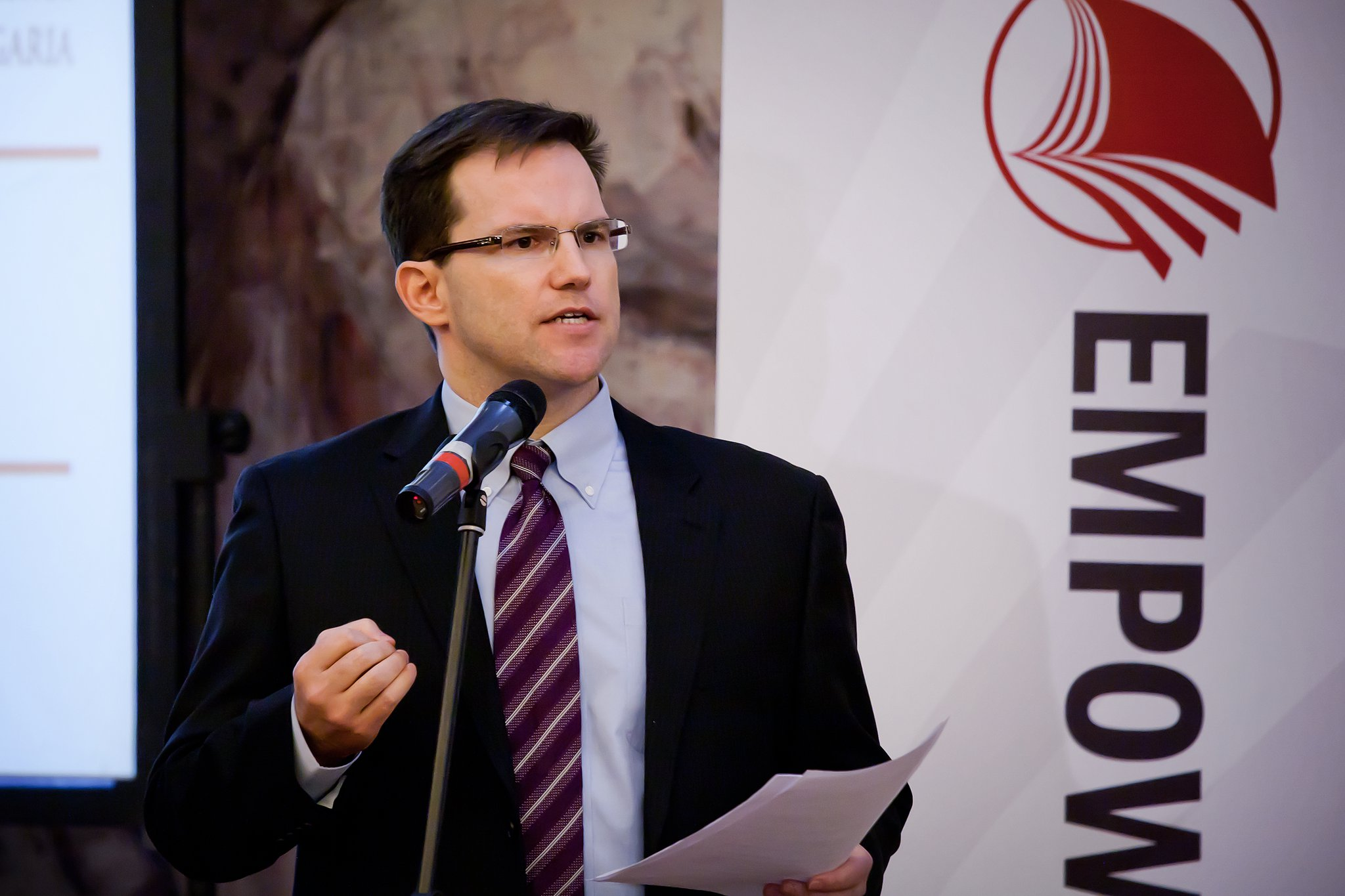
- Tom Higgins during his speech at the Empower Award opening event in 2011
- Born: Thomas Michael Higgins; July 16, 1966 (age 60); New York City, U.S.
- Education: University at Albany, SUNY (BS); Northwestern University (MBA)
- Occupations: Social entrepreneur, professional investor, banker and economic development specialist

Thomas Michael "Tom" Higgins (born July 16, 1966) is an American social entrepreneur, professional investor, banker and economic development specialist. He is widely regarded for his work in finance development in Bulgaria and his mission to empower people through entrepreneurship and free market capitalism.

== Early years ==
Higgins graduated from Mahopac High School in 1984. Higgins attended the University at Albany, SUNY, where he excelled in both academics and athletics. At the University at Albany, he received the Wall Street Award for Outstanding Business Student. He was also twice named First Team Academic All American (football). In 1988, Higgins graduated from the University at Albany summa cum laude with a BS in Finance and Management Information Systems.

Higgins worked with Coopers & Lybrand and Equitable Life in New York before entering graduate school. In 1993, Higgins received his MBA from the Kellogg School of Management at Northwestern University.

== Career ==
=== In Bulgaria ===
In 1993, Higgins was chosen to be an MBA Enterprise Corps Volunteer and assigned to work with the Bulgarian American Enterprise Fund (BAEF) in Sofia, Bulgaria. The program was sponsored by the United States Agency for International Development (USAID). After his volunteer-ship ended, Higgins continued to work for BAEF and in 1997, he became Managing Director and Chief Investment Officer. Higgins stayed with the BAEF until 2005. While there, Higgins served as executive director in charge of SME and hotel lending at the Bulgarian-American Credit Bank (BACB), a BAEF start-up portfolio investment which he exited at 42 times the invested funds. Higgins was also instrumental in the development of Outward Bound Bulgaria and the Award for Young Entrepreneurial Excellence.

In 2005, Higgins co-founded and became co-managing partner of the Balkan Accession Fund (BAF), a EUR 110 million private equity and mezzanine finance investment fund, primarily focused on helping successful Bulgarian and Romanian companies expand in Southeast Europe.

Higgins is also Chairman, lead shareholder and angel investor in several internet based Bulgarian companies which help empower people. In 2010, he was given an award for his contribution to the development of the Internet marketplace in Bulgaria by the Bulgarian Web Site Competition.

In 2009, Higgins founded the Empower United Foundation, a not-for-profit organization focused, initially on empowering young people in the areas of entrepreneurship and leadership development through the Empower Award program, which is supported by the Ministry of Economy, Energy and Tourism of the Republic of Bulgaria and the Empower Intern program, which is supported by the America for Bulgaria Foundation.

Higgins holds significant leadership positions in the Bulgarian business community, including membership on the Board of Trustees of the American University in Bulgaria (AUBG) and membership on the Advisory Committee of Teach for Bulgaria. Higgins is also a member of YPO, Europe One Chapter.

== Personal life ==
Higgins is married to Penka Georgieva. He currently splits his time between Sofia, Bulgaria and New York, USA.
