= Joe Reader =

English footballer

Personal information
- Full name: Josiah Reader
- Date of birth: 27 February 1866
- Place of birth: West Bromwich, England
- Date of death: 8 March 1954 (aged 88)
- Place of death: West Bromwich, England
- Position: Goalkeeper

Youth career
- 1885: West Bromwich Albion

Senior career*
Years	Team	Apps	(Gls)
1885–1901	West Bromwich Albion	315	(0)

International career
1894	England	1	(0)
- * Club domestic league appearances and goals

Josiah "Joe" Reader (27 February 1866 – 8 March 1954) was an English footballer who played as a goalkeeper. He spent his entire professional career with West Bromwich Albion and served the club as a player, coach and steward for a total of 65 years. He made one appearance for England in a 2–2 draw against Ireland on 3 March 1894.

== Biography ==
Reader was born in West Bromwich, where he attended Beeches Road School and St Phillips School. He joined West Bromwich Albion as an amateur in January 1885 and turned professional in August of the same year. Reader made his league debut in October 1889 in a Division One match away to Aston Villa. He won an FA Cup winners medal with Albion when they beat Villa 3–0 in the 1892 final. In 1894 he won his only England cap, in a 2–2 draw with Ireland in Belfast. He helped Albion reach the FA Cup Final once more in 1895, but this time was on the losing side as Aston Villa won 1–0. Following Albion's move to The Hawthorns in 1900, Reader became the only player to have represented the club in a competitive match at three different grounds, namely Four Acres, Stoney Lane and The Hawthorns. After 370 senior appearances for Albion, Reader retired from playing football due to illness in April 1901. He then took up the role of trainer-coach at the club, and later became a ground steward at The Hawthorns until 1950. He died in West Bromwich in March 1954, aged 88.
