= Thomas Twistington Higgins =

British surgeon

Doctor Thomas Twistington Higgins
- Born: Bolton, Lancashire
- Died: Deal, Kent
- Education: Manchester University
- Years active: 1909–1953
- Honours: OBE

Thomas Twistington Higgins was the head surgeon at Great Ormond Street Hospital between 1919 and 1953.

Whilst at Great Ormond Street, he furthered the field of paediatric medicine, and was largely responsible for paediatric surgery becoming a special branch of medicine.

He was a leading authority on the history of Great Ormond Street Hospital, writing a history of the hospital for its centenary year. One of his six children was dancer and painter Elizabeth Twistington Higgins.
