= Tom Higgins (footballer, born 1874) =

English footballer

Personal information
- Full name: John Thomas Higgins
- Date of birth: 1874
- Place of birth: Halesowen, England
- Date of death: 1916 (aged 41–42)
- Position: Centre half

Senior career*
Years	Team	Apps	(Gls)
1889–1893	Albion Swifts		
1893–1894	Stourbridge		
1894–1898	West Bromwich Albion	74	(4)
Total		74	(4)
- * Club domestic league appearances and goals

John Thomas Higgins (1874–1916) was an English footballer who played in the Football League for West Bromwich Albion with whom he played in the 1895 FA Cup Final.
