= 1895 FA Cup final =

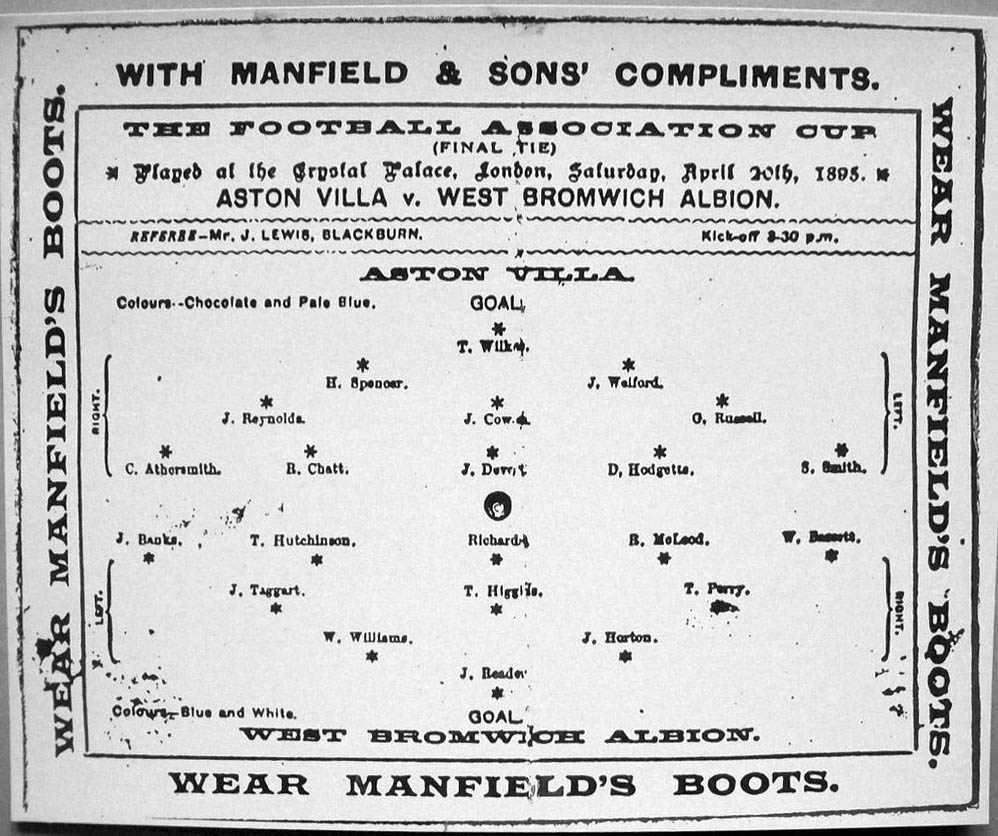
- Match programme
- Event: 1894–95 FA Cup
Aston Villa	West Bromwich Albion
1	0
- Date: 20 April 1895
- Venue: Crystal Palace, London
- Referee: John Lewis
- Attendance: 42,560

The 1895 FA Cup final was contested by Aston Villa and West Bromwich Albion at Crystal Palace. Aston Villa won 1–0, with Bob Chatt being credited with scoring the fastest goal in FA Cup Final history, scored after just 30 seconds. This record would stand for 114 years before being broken by Louis Saha of Everton in the 2009 FA Cup Final with a goal after 25 seconds.

== Summary ==
Aston Villa and West Bromwich Albion became the first pair of clubs to meet in the FA Cup Final for a third time: the teams had previously met in the 1887 final, won by Villa, and the 1892 final, won by the Albion. The final was played for the first time at Crystal Palace, which was to host the finals for the next twenty years. The weather for the final was described as "a beautiful spring day", and consequently the crowd and press were still coming into the ground when the game kicked off.

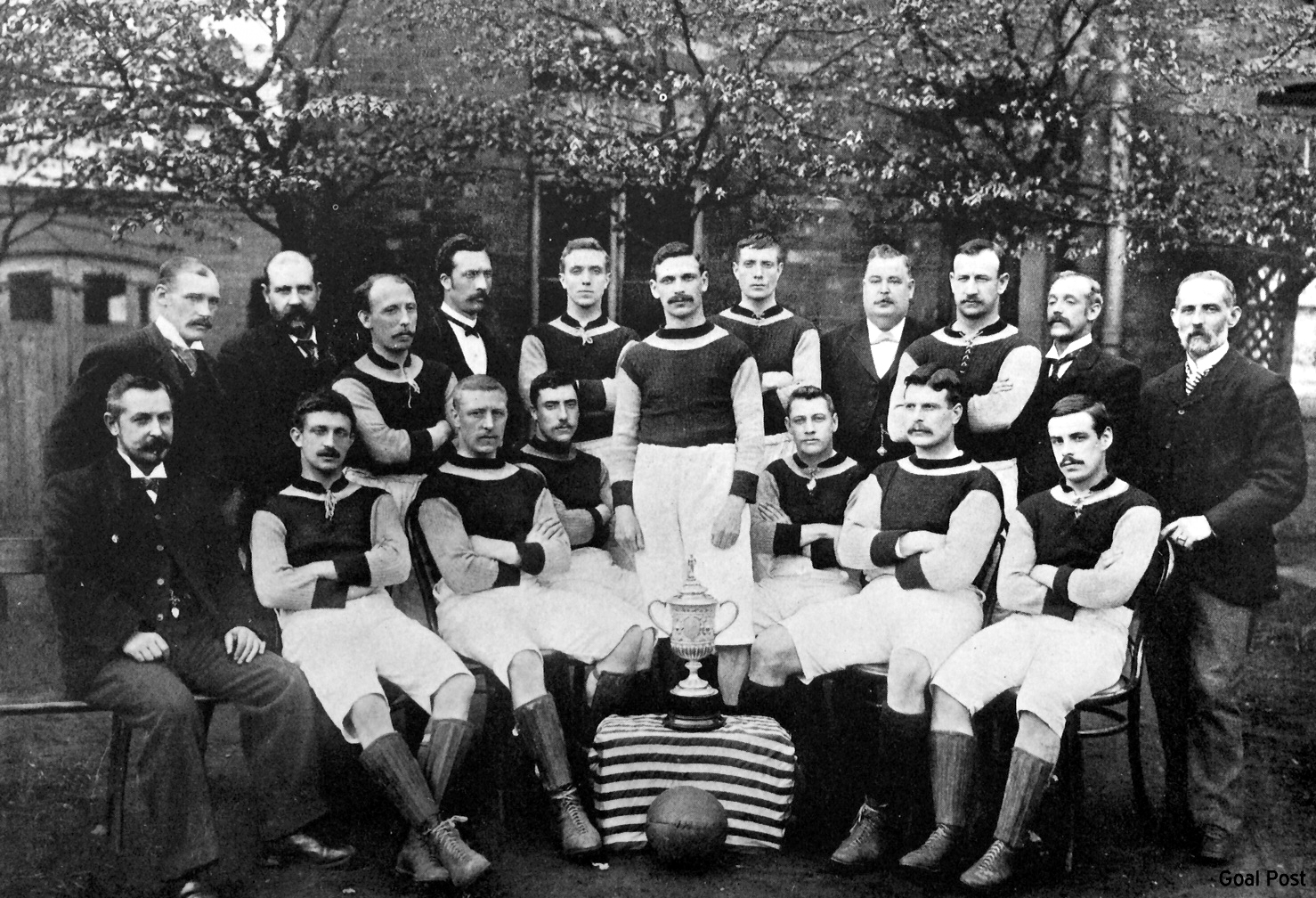
Aston Villa players posing with the trophy

From the kick-off, John Devey, the Villa centre-forward, swung the ball out to his inside-left, Dennis Hodgetts. Hodgetts' long cross-pass found Charlie Athersmith on the right, and his centre fell to Bob Chatt who sent the ball goalwards on a half volley. Albion's keeper Joe Reader was only able to get his fingers to the shot, and turned the ball across the goal mouth and, after a goalmouth scramble involving Devey and Albion defender Jack Horton, the ball was turned in to the net.

There are no accurate timings for the goal and different reports time it at between 30 and 39 seconds. At the time, many of the crowd and press missed the goal as they were still taking their seats, and the press reports indicated that Chatt had scored. According to Ward & Griffin in their "Essential History of Aston Villa" however, "after the game, the Villa players confirmed that John Devey had netted after Chatt's shot had been blocked straight into the latter's path and had ricocheted off his knee." Despite this claim, The Football Association still credit the goal to Chatt as having been scored on thirty seconds.

The fastest accurately timed goal was Louis Saha's effort for Everton after 25 seconds in the 2009 final.

Despite pressure from the Albion forwards, especially the outstanding Billy Bassett, Villa were able to hold on to their lead until half-time. In the second half, neither side was able to add to the score and Villa held on to win the cup for the second time.

== Match details ==
20 April 1895

Aston Villa	1–0	West Bromwich Albion
Chatt 1'

Crystal Palace, London
Attendance: 42,560
Referee: John Lewis

Aston Villa	W.B. Albion

GK	(England) Tom Wilkes
DF	(England) Howard Spencer
DF	(England) Jimmy Welford
MF	(England) Jack Reynolds
MF	(Scotland) James Cowan
MF	(Scotland) George Russell
FW	(England) Charlie Athersmith
FW	(England) Bob Chatt
FW	(England) John Devey (c)
FR	(England) Dennis Hodgetts
FL	(England) Stephen Smith
Manager:
(Scotland) George Ramsay

GK	(England) Joe Reader
DF	(England) Billy Williams
DF	(England) Jack Horton
MD	(England) Tom Perry
MD	(England) Tom Higgins
MD	(Northern Ireland) Jack Taggart
FW	(England) Billy Bassett
FW	(Scotland) Roddy McLeod
FW	(England) Billy Richards
FR	(Scotland) Tom Hutchinson
FL	(England) Jack Banks
Manager:
(England) Edward Stephenson

== See also ==
- Aston Villa F.C.–West Bromwich Albion F.C. rivalry
