= The Dance Goes On (1980 film) =

The Dance Goes On is a 1980 American documentary film.

It was narrated by Rudolf Nureyev.
